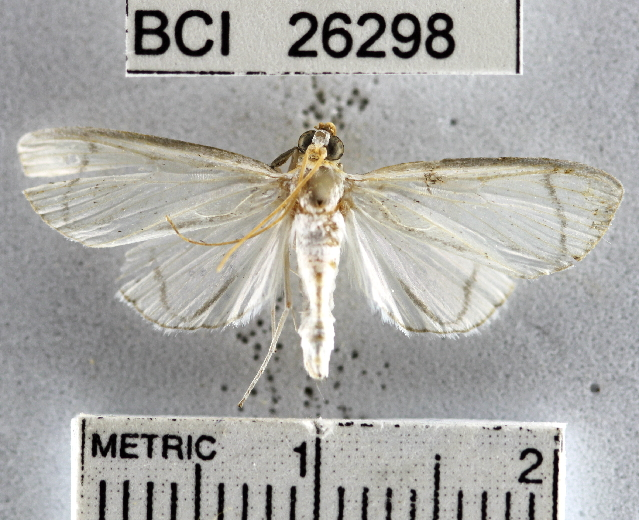

Scientific classification
- Domain: Eukaryota
- Kingdom: Animalia
- Phylum: Arthropoda
- Class: Insecta
- Order: Lepidoptera
- Family: Crambidae
- Genus: Syllepte
- Species: S. angulifera

Binomial name
- Syllepte angulifera (H. Druce, 1895)

Synonyms
- Zunacetha angulifera H. Druce, 1895

= Syllepte angulifera =

Species of moth

Syllepte angulifera is a moth in the family Crambidae. It was described by Herbert Druce in 1895. It is found in Guatemala, Costa Rica, Panama and Mexico.

The forewings and hindwings are hyaline white, the former crossed near the apex by a narrow brownish line which almost reaches the anal angle and then turns inwards along the inner margin. The hindwings have a narrow V-shaped brownish line below the middle, which does not touch either margin.
