= Syllepte trizonalis =

Scientific classification
- Domain: Eukaryota
- Kingdom: Animalia
- Phylum: Arthropoda
- Class: Insecta
- Order: Lepidoptera
- Family: Crambidae
- Genus: Syllepte
- Species: S. trizonalis

Binomial name
- Syllepte trizonalis (Sepp, 1855)

Synonyms
- Phalaena trizonalis Sepp, 1855

Species of moth

Syllepte trizonalis is a moth species in the family Crambidae. It was described by Sepp in 1855. It is found in Indonesia (Sumatra).
