= Syllepte strigicincta =

Scientific classification
- Kingdom: Animalia
- Phylum: Arthropoda
- Class: Insecta
- Order: Lepidoptera
- Family: Crambidae
- Genus: Syllepte
- Species: S. strigicincta

Binomial name
- Syllepte strigicincta (Hampson, 1912)

Synonyms
- Sylepta strigicincta Hampson, 1912

Species of moth

Syllepte strigicincta is a moth in the family Crambidae. It was described by George Hampson in 1912. It is found in Ecuador.

The wingspan is about 31 mm. The forewings are orange yellow with slight subbasal brownish spots in the cell and above the inner margin. The costa is brownish to the excurved dark antemedial line, which is incurved and obsolescent at vein 1. There is a black discoidal lunule and a postmedial line formed of small fuscous spots in and on the interspaces, arising below the costa, incurved at vein 7, excurved to vein 2, then bent inwards. There is a series of dark striae just before the termen. The hindwings are orange yellow with a black discoidal spot. The postmedial line is rather diffused, fuscous, excurved between veins 5 and 2 and slightly below the submedian fold. There is a series of dark striae just before the termen.
