= Syllepte macallalis =

Scientific classification
- Domain: Eukaryota
- Kingdom: Animalia
- Phylum: Arthropoda
- Class: Insecta
- Order: Lepidoptera
- Family: Crambidae
- Genus: Syllepte
- Species: S. macallalis

Binomial name
- Syllepte macallalis (West, 1931)

Synonyms
- Sylepta macallalis West, 1931

Species of moth

Syllepte macallalis is a moth in the family Crambidae. It was described by West in 1931. It is found in the Philippines (Luzon).
