= Syllepte kenrickalis =

Scientific classification
- Kingdom: Animalia
- Phylum: Arthropoda
- Class: Insecta
- Order: Lepidoptera
- Family: Crambidae
- Genus: Syllepte
- Species: S. kenrickalis

Binomial name
- Syllepte kenrickalis Viette, 1960

Species of moth

Syllepte kenrickalis is a moth of the family Crambidae that is found in Madagascar. It was described by Viette in 1960.
