= Syllepte neofulviceps =

Scientific classification
- Domain: Eukaryota
- Kingdom: Animalia
- Phylum: Arthropoda
- Class: Insecta
- Order: Lepidoptera
- Family: Crambidae
- Genus: Syllepte
- Species: S. neofulviceps

Binomial name
- Syllepte neofulviceps Klima, 1939

Synonyms
- Sylepta fulviceps Hampson, 1918

Species of moth

Syllepte neofulviceps is a moth in the family Crambidae. It is found in Colombia.
