= Syllepte agraphalis =

Scientific classification
- Kingdom: Animalia
- Phylum: Arthropoda
- Class: Insecta
- Order: Lepidoptera
- Family: Crambidae
- Genus: Syllepte
- Species: S. agraphalis

Binomial name
- Syllepte agraphalis (Hampson, 1912)

Synonyms
- Sylepta agraphalis Hampson, 1912

Species of moth

Syllepte agraphalis is a moth in the family Crambidae. It was described by George Hampson in 1912. It is found in Bhutan and Assam, India.

The wingspan is about 32 mm. The forewings are grey brown with a slight dark antemedial mark on the costa and an oblique whitish line defined on the outer side by fuscous from the cell to the inner margin. There is a small whitish spot at the middle of the cell and a curved discoidal striga, both defined by fuscous. The postmedial line is represented by a small fuscous spot at the costa with two small whitish spots below it, then by a series of small fuscous spots with whitish points on their outer side. There is a terminal series of minute blackish points. The hindwings are grey brown with an oblique dark discoidal striga and a slight dark postmedial line defined on the outer side by whitish, bent outwards between veins 5 and 2, then retracted and oblique to above the tornus. There is a terminal series of blackish striae.
