= Syllepte chalybifascia =

Scientific classification
- Kingdom: Animalia
- Phylum: Arthropoda
- Class: Insecta
- Order: Lepidoptera
- Family: Crambidae
- Genus: Syllepte
- Species: S. chalybifascia

Binomial name
- Syllepte chalybifascia (Hampson, 1896)

Synonyms
- Sylepta chalybifascia Hampson, 1896

Species of moth

Syllepte chalybifascia is a moth in the family Crambidae. It was described by George Hampson in 1896. It is found in India (Nagas).

The wingspan is about 22 mm. The wings are pale glossy and semihyaline (almost glass-like) yellow, the forewings with an ocellate antemedial mark extending from the costa to the inner margin, enclosing a pale centre, its edges rufous and steel blue. There is a steel-blue and rufous wedge-shaped fascia on the inner area from the antemedial mark to the nearly straight black submarginal line, which expands into a spot at the costa and is broken near the inner margin. The discocellulars and veins beyond the cell are marked with rufous and there is a faint diffused rufous line just inside the margin. The apex is blackish, with a white spot below it. The hindwings have a discocellular blackish band and the inner area is tinged with rufous and has three curved black bars on it. There is also a dark submarginal line from the costa to vein 2 with diffused rufous beyond it.
