= Syllepte fuscoinvalidalis =

Scientific classification
- Domain: Eukaryota
- Kingdom: Animalia
- Phylum: Arthropoda
- Class: Insecta
- Order: Lepidoptera
- Family: Crambidae
- Genus: Syllepte
- Species: S. fuscoinvalidalis

Binomial name
- Syllepte fuscoinvalidalis Yamanaka, 1959

Species of moth

Syllepte fuscoinvalidalis is a moth in the family Crambidae. It was described by Hiroshi Yamanaka in 1959. It is found in Japan and China.
