= Syllepte sulphureotincta =

Scientific classification
- Domain: Eukaryota
- Kingdom: Animalia
- Phylum: Arthropoda
- Class: Insecta
- Order: Lepidoptera
- Family: Crambidae
- Genus: Syllepte
- Species: S. sulphureotincta

Binomial name
- Syllepte sulphureotincta (Hampson, 1918)

Synonyms
- Sylepta sulphureotincta Hampson, 1918

Species of moth

Syllepte sulphureotincta is a moth in the family Crambidae. It was described by George Hampson in 1918. It is endemic to Mozambique.

The wingspan is about 24 millimetres (0.94 in). The forewings are white tinged with sulphur-yellow, the base and costal area pale rufous. The antemedial line is dark tinged with yellow, oblique to just below the cell, then erect. There is a dark annulus in the middle of the cell and a discoidal bar tinged with yellow and filled in with white. The postmedial line is dark tinged with yellow, excurved and waved between veins 5 and 2, then retracted to below the angle of the cell and angled outwards below the submedian fold. There is a similar faint line beyond it and a red-brown terminal line. The hindwings are white, the terminal area tinged with sulphur-yellow except at the tornus. There is a dark discoidal bar and the postmedial line is dark, bent outwards and waved between veins 5 and 2, then retracted to below the angle of the cell and erect to the inner margin. There is a faint waved brownish subterminal line and a red-brown terminal line.
