= Syllepte nigralis =

Scientific classification
- Domain: Eukaryota
- Kingdom: Animalia
- Phylum: Arthropoda
- Class: Insecta
- Order: Lepidoptera
- Family: Crambidae
- Genus: Syllepte
- Species: S. nigralis

Binomial name
- Syllepte nigralis (Kaye, 1925)

Synonyms
- Sylepta nigralis Kaye, 1925

Species of moth

Syllepte nigralis is a moth in the family Crambidae. It was described by William James Kaye in 1925. It is found in Trinidad.
