= Syllepte ochrotozona =

Scientific classification
- Kingdom: Animalia
- Phylum: Arthropoda
- Class: Insecta
- Order: Lepidoptera
- Family: Crambidae
- Genus: Syllepte
- Species: S. ochrotozona

Binomial name
- Syllepte ochrotozona (Hampson, 1898)

Synonyms
- Sylepta ochrotozona Hampson, 1898

Species of moth

Syllepte ochrotozona is a moth in the family Crambidae. It was described by George Hampson in 1898. It is found in Australia, where it has been recorded from Queensland.

The wingspan is about 36 mm. Adults are fuscous brown, the forewings with traces of a dentate black antemedial line angled inwards below the cell. There is a discocellular spot. There is an indistinct postmedial line, minutely dentate from the costa to vein 2, then retracted to the cell. The hindwings have a postmedial black line ending at the tornus, strongly defined on the outer side by ochreous, and dentate between veins 5 and 2. Both wings have a terminal series of ochreous and dark points.
