= Syllepte guilboti =

Scientific classification
- Domain: Eukaryota
- Kingdom: Animalia
- Phylum: Arthropoda
- Class: Insecta
- Order: Lepidoptera
- Family: Crambidae
- Genus: Syllepte
- Species: S. guilboti

Binomial name
- Syllepte guilboti Guillermet, 2008

Species of moth

Syllepte guilboti is a moth in the family Crambidae. It was described by Christian Guillermet in 2008. It is found on Réunion in the Indian Ocean.
