= Syllepte nyanzana =

Scientific classification
- Domain: Eukaryota
- Kingdom: Animalia
- Phylum: Arthropoda
- Class: Insecta
- Order: Lepidoptera
- Family: Crambidae
- Genus: Syllepte
- Species: S. nyanzana

Binomial name
- Syllepte nyanzana (Grünberg, 1910)

Synonyms
- Sylepta nyanzana Grünberg, 1910

Species of moth

Syllepte nyanzana is a moth in the family Crambidae. It was described by Karl Grünberg in 1910. It is endemic to Uganda.
