= Syllepte invalidalis =

Scientific classification
- Domain: Eukaryota
- Kingdom: Animalia
- Phylum: Arthropoda
- Class: Insecta
- Order: Lepidoptera
- Family: Crambidae
- Genus: Syllepte
- Species: S. invalidalis

Binomial name
- Syllepte invalidalis (South in Leech & South, 1901)

Synonyms
- Sylepta invalidalis Leech in Leech & South, 1901

Species of moth

Syllepte invalidalis is a moth in the family Crambidae. It was described by South in 1901. It is found in China.

The wingspan is about 24 mm. The forewings are pale ochreous brown, suffused with darker brown, except on the costa. There is a spot in the cell and one at the end of the cell, both are blackish. The space between the spots is pale ochreous brown. The antemedial and postmedial lines are blackish, the first oblique, the second outwardly edged with ground colour, slightly oblique and bluntly serrate to vein 2 where it turns inwards to below the end of the cell, then sinuous to the inner margin. The hindwings are more suffused with darker brown than the forewings and the discal spot and postmedial line are blackish, the latter rather sinuous and turned inwards for a short distance along vein 2.
