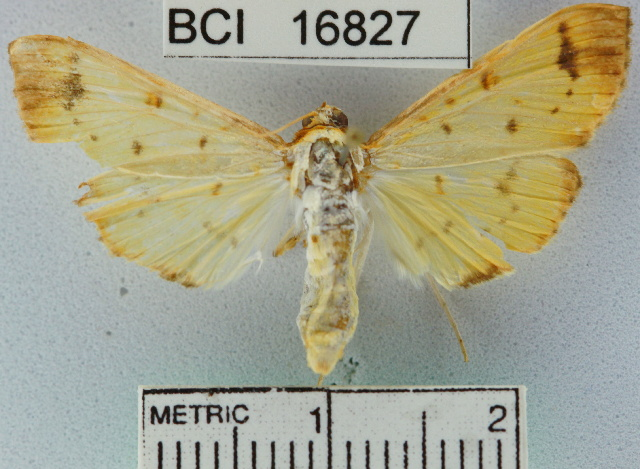
- Syllepte amando

Scientific classification
- Kingdom: Animalia
- Phylum: Arthropoda
- Class: Insecta
- Order: Lepidoptera
- Family: Crambidae
- Tribe: Agroterini
- Genus: Syllepte; Hübner, 1823

Type species
- Syllepte incomptalis Hübner, 1823

Synonyms
- List: Arthriobasis Warren, 1896; Haitufa Swinhoe, 1900; Haliotigris Warren, 1896; Neomabra Dognin, 1905; Nothosalbia Swinhoe, 1900; Polycorys Warren, 1896; Subhedylepta Strand, 1918; Sylepta Hübner; Syllepta Hübner, 1826

= Syllepte =

Genus of moths

Syllepte is a genus of moths in the family Crambidae.

== Species ==
- Syllepte abyssalis (Snellen, 1892)
- Syllepte achromalis Hampson, 1912
- Syllepte acridentalis Hampson, 1912
- Syllepte adductalis (Walker, 1859)
- Syllepte aechmisalis (Walker, 1859)
- Syllepte aenigmatica E. Hering, 1901
- Syllepte ageneta Turner, 1908
- Syllepte agraphalis Hampson, 1912
- Syllepte albicostalis Schaus, 1920
- Syllepte albifurcalis Dognin, 1913
- Syllepte albirivalis Hampson, 1912
- Syllepte albitorquata Tams, 1924
- Syllepte albopunctum Guillermet, 1996
- Syllepte amando (Cramer, 1779)
- Syllepte amelialis Viette, 1957
- Syllepte amissalis (Guenée, 1854)
- Syllepte amoyalis Caradja, 1925
- Syllepte anchuralis Schaus, 1920
- Syllepte angulifera (Druce, 1895)
- Syllepte argillosa Guillermet in Viette & Guillermet, 1996
- Syllepte atrisquamalis (Hampson, 1912)
- Syllepte attenualis (Hampson, 1912)
- Syllepte aureotinctalis (Kenrick, 1917)
- Syllepte azadesalis Schaus, 1927
- Syllepte banosalis Schaus, 1927
- Syllepte belialis (Walker, 1859)
- Syllepte benedictalis Holland, 1900
- Syllepte berambalis Schaus, 1927
- Syllepte bipartalis Hampson, 1899
- Syllepte birdalis (Schaus, 1920)
- Syllepte bitjecola (Strand, 1920)
- Syllepte brunneiterminalis Hampson, 1918
- Syllepte brunnescens (Hampson, 1912)
- Syllepte butlerii (Dewitz, 1881)
- Syllepte capnosalis Caradja, 1925
- Syllepte carbatinalis (Swinhoe, 1890)
- Syllepte cathanalis Schaus, 1927
- Syllepte chalybifascia Hampson, 1896
- Syllepte christophalis (Viette, 1988)
- Syllepte cissalis Yamanaka, 1987
- Syllepte coelivitta (Walker, 1866)
- Syllepte cohaesalis (Walker, 1866
- Syllepte cometa (Warren, 1896)
- Syllepte commotes Tams, 1935
- Syllepte confusalis Becker, 2023 (from Brazil)
- Syllepte consimilalis (Lederer, 1863)
- Syllepte crenilinealis Hampson, 1918
- Syllepte curiusalis (Walker, 1859)
- Syllepte cyanea (Walker, 1866)
- Syllepte dentilinea Gaede, 1916
- Syllepte desmialis (Hampson, 1912)
- Syllepte diacymalis (Hampson, 1912)
- Syllepte dialis (Schaus, 1912)
- Syllepte dinawa Kenrick, 1912
- Syllepte dioptalis (Walker, 1866)
- Syllepte disciselenalis (Hampson, 1918)
- Syllepte disticta (Hampson, 1912)
- Syllepte distinguenda E. Hering, 1901
- Syllepte dottoalis (Schaus, 1927)
- Syllepte elegans West, 1931
- Syllepte elphegalis Schaus, 1927
- Syllepte erebarcha (Meyrick, 1939)
- Syllepte eriopisalis (Walker, 1859)
- Syllepte fabiusalis (Walker, 1859)
- Syllepte favillacealis (Snellen, 1899)
- Syllepte fraternalis Becker, 2023 (from Mexico)
- Syllepte fulviceps (Bethune-Baker, 1909)
- Syllepte fuscoinvalidalis Yamanaka, 1959
- Syllepte fuscomarginalis (Leech, 1889)
- Syllepte gastralis (Walker, 1866)
- Syllepte glebalis (Lederer, 1863
- Syllepte guilboti (Guillermet, 2008)
- Syllepte heliochroa (Hampson, 1912)
- Syllepte hemichionalis (Mabille, 1900)
- Syllepte hoenei Caradja, 1925
- Syllepte holochralis (Hampson, 1912)
- Syllepte hyalescens (Hampson, 1898)
- Syllepte incomptalis (Hübner, 1823)
- Syllepte invalidalis (Leech & South, 1901)
- Syllepte iophanes Meyrick, 1894
- Syllepte iridescens E. Hering, 1901
- Syllepte kayei Klima, 1939
- Syllepte kenrickalis Viette, 1960
- Syllepte lactiguttalis Warren, 1896
- Syllepte lagoalis Viette, 1957
- Syllepte lanatalis Viette, 1960
- Syllepte laticalis (Lederer, 1863)
- Syllepte leonalis (Schaus, 1893)
- Syllepte leopardalis (Moore, 1888)
- Syllepte leucodontia (Hampson, 1898)
- Syllepte leucographalis Hampson, 1912
- Syllepte lineolata (Sepp, 1855)
- Syllepte lucidalis Caradja, 1925
- Syllepte lygropialis West, 1931
- Syllepte macallalis West, 1931
- Syllepte macarealis Schaus, 1927
- Syllepte machinalis (C. Felder, R. Felder & Rogenhofer, 1875)
- Syllepte maculilinealis (Hampson, 1918)
- Syllepte mahafalalis Marion & Viette, 1956
- Syllepte malgassanalis (Viette, 1954)
- Syllepte mandarinalis Caradja, 1925
- Syllepte melanomma Hampson, 1912
- Syllepte melanopalis Hampson, 1908
- Syllepte mesoleucalis Hampson, 1898
- Syllepte methyalinalis Hampson, 1912
- Syllepte microdontalis Hampson, 1912
- Syllepte microsema Hampson, 1912
- Syllepte microspilalis Hampson, 1912
- Syllepte microstictalis (Hampson, 1918)
- Syllepte mildredalis Schaus, 1927
- Syllepte mimalis (C. Felder, R. Felder & Rogenhofer, 1875)
- Syllepte molybdopasta Hampson, 1918
- Syllepte monoleuca Hampson, 1912
- Syllepte nasonalis Hampson, 1898
- Syllepte nebulalis Schaus, 1920
- Syllepte neofulviceps
- Syllepte neurogramma (Meyrick, 1939)
- Syllepte nigralis (Kaye, 1925)
- Syllepte nigriflava Swinhoe, 1894
- Syllepte nigriscriptalis (Warren, 1896)
- Syllepte nigrodentalis (Pagenstecher, 1884)
- Syllepte ningpoalis (Leech, 1889)
- Syllepte nitidalis (Dognin, 1905)
- Syllepte nyanzana (Grünberg, 1910)
- Syllepte occlusalis (Dognin, 1905)
- Syllepte ochrifusalis (Hampson, 1899)
- Syllepte ochritinctalis (Hampson, 1918)
- Syllepte ochrotichroa (Hampson, 1918)
- Syllepte ochrotozona Hampson, 1898
- Syllepte ogoalis (Walker, 1859)
- Syllepte opalisans (C. Felder, R. Felder & Rogenhofer, 1875)
- Syllepte orbiferalis Hampson, 1898
- Syllepte pactolalis (Guenée, 1854)
- Syllepte pallidinotalis (Hampson, 1912)
- Syllepte parvipuncta Hampson, 1912
- Syllepte patagialis Zeller, 1852
- Syllepte paucilinealis (Snellen, 1880)
- Syllepte paucistrialis Warren, 1896
- Syllepte penthodes (Meyrick, 1902)
- Syllepte petroalis Schaus, 1927
- Syllepte phaeophlebalis Hampson, 1912
- Syllepte phaeopleura Turner, 1922
- Syllepte phalangiodalis E. Hering, 1901
- Syllepte philetalis (Walker, 1859)
- Syllepte phricosticha Turner, 1908
- Syllepte picalis Hampson, 1898
- Syllepte pilocrocialis Strand, 1918
- Syllepte placophaea (Turner, 1915)
- Syllepte planeflava Hampson, 1912
- Syllepte plumifera Hampson, 1898
- Syllepte pogonodes (Hampson, 1899)
- Syllepte polydonta (Hampson, 1898)
- Syllepte proctizonalis (Hampson, 1918)
- Syllepte pseudovialis Hampson, 1912
- Syllepte purpuralis (Walker, 1866)
- Syllepte purpurascens Hampson, 1899
- Syllepte retractalis Hampson, 1912
- Syllepte rhyparialis (Oberthür, 1893)
- Syllepte rogationis Hampson, 1918
- Syllepte rosalina (Strand, 1920)
- Syllepte rubrifucalis Mabille, 1900
- Syllepte ruricolalis (Snellen, 1880)
- Syllepte sakarahalis (Marion & Viette, 1956)
- Syllepte sarronalis (Walker, 1859)
- Syllepte satanas E. Hering, 1901
- Syllepte secreta (Meyrick, 1936)
- Syllepte segnalis (Leech, 1889)
- Syllepte sellalis (Guenée, 1854)
- Syllepte semilugens Hampson, 1912
- Syllepte seminigralis (Warren, 1896)
- Syllepte semivialis (Moore, 1888)
- Syllepte solilucis Hampson, 1898
- Syllepte sororalis Becker, 2023 (from Brazil)
- Syllepte straminalis (Guenée, 1854)
- Syllepte straminea Butler, 1875
- Syllepte strigicincta Hampson, 1912)
- Syllepte striginervalis (Guenée, 1854)
- Syllepte stumpffalis Viette, 1960
- Syllepte subaenescens (Warren, 1896)
- Syllepte subcyaneoalba (Hampson, 1918)
- Syllepte sulphureotincta (Hampson, 1918)
- Syllepte taiwanalis Shibuya, 1928
- Syllepte tenebrosalis (Warren, 1896)
- Syllepte tetrathyralis Hampson, 1912
- Syllepte thomealis (Viette, 1957)
- Syllepte torsipex (Hampson, 1898)
- Syllepte trachelota Turner, 1913
- Syllepte trifidalis Hampson, 1908
- Syllepte trizonalis (Sepp, 1855)
- Syllepte tumidipes Hampson, 1912
- Syllepte vagalis (Snellen, 1901
- Syllepte vagans (Tutt, 1890)
- Syllepte venustalis Swinhoe, 1894
- Syllepte viridivertex Schaus, 1920
- Syllepte vohilavalis (Viette, 1954)
- Syllepte xanthothorax (Meyrick, 1933)
- Syllepte xylocraspis Hampson, 1912
- Syllepte zarialis (Swinhoe, 1917)

== Former species ==
- Syllepte aedilis (Meyrick, 1887)
- Syllepte agilis Meyrick, 1936
- Syllepte avunculalis (Saalmüller, 1880)
- Syllepte balteata (Fabricius, 1798)
- Syllepte batrachina Meyrick, 1936
- Syllepte chromalis (Walker, 1866)
- Syllepte clementsi Hampson, 1898
- Syllepte concatenalis (Walker, 1866)
- Syllepte crotonalis (Walker, 1859)
- Syllepte denticulata (Moore, 1888)
- Syllepte derogata (Fabricius, 1775)
- Syllepte fuscoalbalis (Hampson, 1898)
- Syllepte imbroglialis (Dyar, 1914)
- Syllepte jatingaensis (Rose & Singh, 1989)
- Syllepte klossi Rothschild, 1915
- Syllepte lunalis (Guenée, 1854)
- Syllepte mysisalis (Walker, 1859)
- Syllepte neodesmialis Klima, 1939
- Syllepte ovialis (Walker, 1859)
- Syllepte palmalis (C. Felder, R. Felder & Rogenhofer, 1875)
- Syllepte pauperalis Marion, 1954
- Syllepte polycymalis (Hampson, 1912)
- Syllepte posticalis (Saalmüller, 1880)
- Syllepte pseudauxo (C. Felder, R. Felder & Rogenhofer, 1875)
- Syllepte pseudoderogata (Strand, 1920)
- Syllepte ridopalis (Swinhoe, 1892)
- Syllepte sabinusalis (Walker, 1859)
- Syllepte undulalis (Pagenstecher, 1907)
- Syllepte viettalis (Marion, 1956)
- Syllepte violacealis Guillermet in Viette & Guillermet, 1996
