= Syllepte methyalinalis =

Scientific classification
- Kingdom: Animalia
- Phylum: Arthropoda
- Class: Insecta
- Order: Lepidoptera
- Family: Crambidae
- Genus: Syllepte
- Species: S. methyalinalis

Binomial name
- Syllepte methyalinalis (Hampson, 1912)

Synonyms
- Sylepta methyalinalis Hampson, 1912

Species of moth

Syllepte methyalinalis is a moth in the family Crambidae. It was described by George Hampson in 1912. It is found in Guyana.

The wingspan is about 30 mm. The forewings are cupreous brown, the costal area fulvous yellow to the postmedial line and with a sinuous dark antemedial line defined by white marks on each side with a small quadrate white spot beyond it in the cell. There is a quadrate hyaline-white patch in the end of the cell and a slight pale discoidal striga. The postmedial line is excurved between veins 5 and 2, then retracted to the lower angle of the cell and angled outwards on vein 2, with a trifid hyaline patch beyond it from the costa to vein 5, two spots before it between veins 6 and 5, a patch in its sinus and a patch beyond it extending to the termen above the tornus. There are two spots beyond it above and below vein 2 and one before it in the submedian interspace, as well as a dark terminal line. The hindwings are semihyaline white, the base with slight blackish marks and a blackish discoidal annulus, as well as a fine postmedial line excurved to near the termen between veins 5 and 2, then retracted and interrupted to near the tornus. There is a black-brown apical patch extending to vein 4 and a spot below vein 2, as well as a fine terminal line.
