= Syllepte ageneta =

Scientific classification
- Domain: Eukaryota
- Kingdom: Animalia
- Phylum: Arthropoda
- Class: Insecta
- Order: Lepidoptera
- Family: Crambidae
- Genus: Syllepte
- Species: S. ageneta

Binomial name
- Syllepte ageneta (Turner, 1908)

Synonyms
- Sylepta ageneta Turner, 1908

Species of moth

Syllepte ageneta is a moth in the family Crambidae. It was described by Turner in 1908. It is found in Australia, where it has been recorded from Queensland.

The wingspan is about 24 mm. The forewings are ochreous-fuscous with fuscous, obscure lines. There is a faint linear discal dot before the middle. The hindwings are fuscous, with an ochreous tinge. There is a postmedian fuscous line produced towards the termen in the mid-third, forming an obtuse process like that of forewings.
