= Syllepte brunneiterminalis =

Scientific classification
- Domain: Eukaryota
- Kingdom: Animalia
- Phylum: Arthropoda
- Class: Insecta
- Order: Lepidoptera
- Family: Crambidae
- Genus: Syllepte
- Species: S. brunneiterminalis

Binomial name
- Syllepte brunneiterminalis (Hampson, 1918)

Synonyms
- Sylepta brunneiterminalis Hampson, 1918

Species of moth

Syllepte brunneiterminalis is a moth in the family Crambidae. It was described by George Hampson in 1918. It is found in Kenya and Nigeria.

The forewings are ochreous yellow, the base, costal and medial areas suffused with red brown. The terminal area is dark reddish brown, glossed with grey. The hindwings are ochreous yellow, the basal area suffused with brown and the terminal area dark reddish brown glossed with grey.
