= Syllepte nigriscriptalis =

Scientific classification
- Kingdom: Animalia
- Phylum: Arthropoda
- Class: Insecta
- Order: Lepidoptera
- Family: Crambidae
- Genus: Syllepte
- Species: S. nigriscriptalis

Binomial name
- Syllepte nigriscriptalis (Warren, 1896)

Synonyms
- Notarcha nigriscriptalis Warren, 1896; Notarcha paucinotalis Warren, 1896

Species of moth

Syllepte nigriscriptalis is a moth in the family Crambidae. It was described by William Warren in 1896. It is found in India, where it has been recorded from Assam and Australia, where it has been recorded from Queensland.

The wingspan is about 32 millimetres (1.3 in). The forewings are dark fawn, with distinct black markings. The first line is curved, located near the base, followed by a small black spot in the cell and a black lunule on the discocellular. The second line is formed of interrupted roundish wedge-shaped marks from the costa at three fourths, running parallel to the hindmargin. The hindwings are less thickly scaled, with the same markings as on the forewings, but without a basal line and first cell spot.
