= Syllepte subcyaneoalba =

Scientific classification
- Kingdom: Animalia
- Phylum: Arthropoda
- Class: Insecta
- Order: Lepidoptera
- Family: Crambidae
- Genus: Syllepte
- Species: S. subcyaneoalba

Binomial name
- Syllepte subcyaneoalba (Hampson, 1918)

Synonyms
- Sylepta subcyaneoalba Hampson, 1918

Species of moth

Syllepte subcyaneoalba is a moth in the family Crambidae. It was described by George Hampson in 1918. It is found in Cameroon.

The wingspan is about 38 mm. The forewings are very dark brown, glossed with purple. There is a faint rather diffused dark antemedial line and an indistinct dark discoidal bar. The postmedial line is faint, dark and rather diffused, erect to vein 3, then retracted to below the end of the cell and erect to the inner margin. There is a slight pale line at the base of the cilia. The hindwings are very dark brown, glossed with purple and there are traces of a dark discoidal spot and a diffused postmedial line. There is also a slight pale line at the base of the cilia.
