= Syllepte trifidalis =

Scientific classification
- Kingdom: Animalia
- Phylum: Arthropoda
- Class: Insecta
- Order: Lepidoptera
- Family: Crambidae
- Genus: Syllepte
- Species: S. trifidalis

Binomial name
- Syllepte trifidalis (Hampson, 1908)

Synonyms
- Sylepta trifidalis Hampson, 1908

Species of moth

Syllepte trifidalis is a moth in the family Crambidae. It is found in South Africa and Yemen.
