= Syllepte viridivertex =

Scientific classification
- Domain: Eukaryota
- Kingdom: Animalia
- Phylum: Arthropoda
- Class: Insecta
- Order: Lepidoptera
- Family: Crambidae
- Genus: Syllepte
- Species: S. viridivertex

Binomial name
- Syllepte viridivertex (Schaus, 1920)

Synonyms
- Sylepta viridivertex Schaus, 1920

Species of moth

Syllepte viridivertex is a moth in the family Crambidae. It was described by William Schaus in 1920. It is found in Venezuela.

The wingspan is about 30 mm. The wings are thinly scaled brownish grey with dull dark brown lines. The antemedial line on the forewings is slightly outcurved and there is a dark line on the discocellular not reaching the lower angle of the cell. There is a dentate postmedial line from the subcostal. The hindwings are more thinly scaled at the base and there is a dark line on the discocellular. The postmedial line is faintly dentate.
