= Syllepte parvipuncta =

Scientific classification
- Domain: Eukaryota
- Kingdom: Animalia
- Phylum: Arthropoda
- Class: Insecta
- Order: Lepidoptera
- Family: Crambidae
- Genus: Syllepte
- Species: S. parvipuncta

Binomial name
- Syllepte parvipuncta (Hampson, 1912)

Synonyms
- Sylepta parvipuncta Hampson, 1912

Species of moth

Syllepte parvipuncta is a moth in the family Crambidae. It was described by George Hampson in 1912. It is found in Ghana and Sierra Leone.

The wingspan is 24–26 millimetres (0.94–1.02 in). The forewings are fuscous brown with a cupreous gloss. The antemedial line is indistinct, whitish defined on outer side by blackish, somewhat oblique from the costa to the submedian fold. There are small black spots at the middle of the cell and on discocellulars, the latter with faint whitish marks before and beyond it. The postmedial line is whitish defined on the inner side by blackish, forming a tridentate white mark from below the costa to vein 5, then excurved to vein 2, then bent inwards to below the base of the cell and more distinct and excurved to the inner margin. The hindwings are fuscous brown with a cupreous gloss. There is a blackish discoidal spot and the postmedial line is whitish defined on the inner side by blackish, bent outwards between veins 5 and 2, then inwards to below the angle of the cell and oblique to above the tornus.
