= Syllepte achromalis =

Scientific classification
- Domain: Eukaryota
- Kingdom: Animalia
- Phylum: Arthropoda
- Class: Insecta
- Order: Lepidoptera
- Family: Crambidae
- Genus: Syllepte
- Species: S. achromalis

Binomial name
- Syllepte achromalis (Hampson, 1912)

Synonyms
- Sylepta achromalis Hampson, 1912

Species of moth

Syllepte achromalis is a moth in the family Crambidae. It was described by George Hampson in 1912. It is found in Cameroon, Nigeria and Sierra Leone.

The wingspan is about 24 millimetres (0.94 in). Adults are pale brownish ochreous, with uniform glossy ochreous wings. The forewings with a faint dark point in the middle of the cell and a discoidal lunule.
