= Syllepte nigrodentalis =

Scientific classification
- Domain: Eukaryota
- Kingdom: Animalia
- Phylum: Arthropoda
- Class: Insecta
- Order: Lepidoptera
- Family: Crambidae
- Genus: Syllepte
- Species: S. nigrodentalis

Binomial name
- Syllepte nigrodentalis (Pagenstecher, 1884)

Synonyms
- Botys nigrodentalis Pagenstecher, 1884

Species of moth

Syllepte nigrodentalis is a moth in the family Crambidae. It was described by Pagenstecher in 1884. It is found in Indonesia (Ambon Island).
