= Syllepte microspilalis =

Scientific classification
- Kingdom: Animalia
- Phylum: Arthropoda
- Class: Insecta
- Order: Lepidoptera
- Family: Crambidae
- Genus: Syllepte
- Species: S. microspilalis

Binomial name
- Syllepte microspilalis (Hampson, 1912)

Synonyms
- Sylepta microspilalis Hampson, 1912

Species of moth

Syllepte microspilalis is a moth in the family Crambidae. It was described by George Hampson in 1912. It is found in Singapore.

The wingspan is about 24 mm. The forewings are ochreous tinged with brown, the costal and terminal areas rather darker. There are two dark antemedial points in the cell and one below the cell with an oblique line from it to the inner margin. There is a small yellowish discoidal lunule defined by fuscous and the postmedial line is dark, minutely dentate and oblique from the costa to vein 2, then retracted to below the angle of the cell and oblique to the inner margin with a dark point at the submedian fold. The hindwings are pale ochreous, the apical area tinged with fuscous. There is a slight postmedial line bent outwards and minutely dentate between veins 5 and 2.
