= Syllepte eriopisalis =

Scientific classification
- Kingdom: Animalia
- Phylum: Arthropoda
- Class: Insecta
- Order: Lepidoptera
- Family: Crambidae
- Genus: Syllepte
- Species: S. eriopisalis

Binomial name
- Syllepte eriopisalis (Walker, 1859)

Synonyms
- Botys eriopisalis Walker, 1859; Pyrausta eriopisalis; Glauconoe atrigenalis Warren, 1896

Species of moth

Syllepte eriopisalis is a moth in the family Crambidae. It was described by Francis Walker in 1859. It is found on Borneo and in India.

The wingspan is about 34 mm (1.3 in). Adults are fuscous grey, the forewings with the base of the costa fuscous. There is an obliquely sinuous antemedial fuscous line and a black speck in the cell. Both wings have a black discocellular lunule and postmedial minutely dentate fuscous line bent outwards between veins 5 and 2, then retracted to below the angle of the cell.
