= Syllepte pseudovialis =

Scientific classification
- Kingdom: Animalia
- Phylum: Arthropoda
- Class: Insecta
- Order: Lepidoptera
- Family: Crambidae
- Genus: Syllepte
- Species: S. pseudovialis

Binomial name
- Syllepte pseudovialis (Hampson, 1912)

Synonyms
- Sylepta pseudovialis Hampson, 1912

Species of moth

Syllepte pseudovialis is a moth in the family Crambidae. It was described by George Hampson in 1912. It is found in India (Sikkim, Assam), Bhutan, Sri Lanka, Borneo and Indonesia (Pulo Laut).

The wingspan is about 30 mm. The forewings are fuscous brown with a slight cupreous gloss with traces of a whitish antemedial line from the cell to the inner margin with a more or less distinct spot beyond it in the cell. There is a quadrate white spot in the end of the cell and a postmedial line forming an elliptical white spot. The hindwings are fuscous brown with a cupreous gloss with a faint dark discoidal lunule and a postmedial line with a small white spot below the costa, then a slight, whitish and bent outwards between veins 6 and 2, then bent inwards to below the end of the cell and more distinct and oblique to above the tornus.
