= Syllepte dinawa =

Scientific classification
- Domain: Eukaryota
- Kingdom: Animalia
- Phylum: Arthropoda
- Class: Insecta
- Order: Lepidoptera
- Family: Crambidae
- Genus: Syllepte
- Species: S. dinawa

Binomial name
- Syllepte dinawa (Kenrick, 1912)

Synonyms
- Sylepta dinawa Kenrick, 1912

Species of moth

Syllepte dinawa is a moth in the family Crambidae. It was described by George Hamilton Kenrick in 1912 and is found in Papua New Guinea.

The wingspan is approximately 42 mm. The forewings are pale ochreous, clouded with dark grey. There is an irregular dark antemedian line and a vague postmedian line with a branch towards the angle. The apex is broadly irrorated (sprinkled) with dark and below the costa at the end of the cell is a lunate mark. There is another smaller mark nearer the base. The hindwings are pale semihyaline (almost glass-like), with traces of dark ante- and postmedian lines, while the hind margin has a broad dark shade.
