= Syllepte amelialis =

Scientific classification
- Domain: Eukaryota
- Kingdom: Animalia
- Phylum: Arthropoda
- Class: Insecta
- Order: Lepidoptera
- Family: Crambidae
- Genus: Syllepte
- Species: S. amelialis

Binomial name
- Syllepte amelialis Viette, 1957

Species of moth

Syllepte amelialis is a moth in the family Crambidae. It was described by Viette in 1957. It is found on São Tomé.
