= Syllepte tumidipes =

Scientific classification
- Domain: Eukaryota
- Kingdom: Animalia
- Phylum: Arthropoda
- Class: Insecta
- Order: Lepidoptera
- Family: Crambidae
- Genus: Syllepte
- Species: S. tumidipes

Binomial name
- Syllepte tumidipes (Hampson, 1912)

Synonyms
- Sylepta tumidipes Hampson, 1912; Pardomima tumidipes; Conogethes empalacta Meyrick, 1937

Species of moth

Syllepte tumidipes is a moth in the family Crambidae. It was described by George Hampson in 1912. It is found in Cameroon, the Democratic Republic of the Congo (West Kasai, Katanga), Gabon, Ghana, Nigeria and Sierra Leone.

The wingspan is 26–28 millimetres (1.0–1.1 in). The forewings are white tinged with ochreous and with a curved black subbasal line from the costa to vein 1, followed by a blackish shade from below the costa to the inner margin. There is a strong curved black-brown antemedial line, conjoined at the median nervure to an oblique bar in the middle of the cell. There is a pale discoidal bar on the black-brown patch extending to the costa and the postmedial line is strong, black-brown, incurved from the costa to vein 5, excurved to vein 2, then bent inwards to the lower edge of the discoidal patch and oblique to the inner margin near the antemedial line. There is also a terminal black-brown band, broad and with a curved inner edge from the costa to vein 4, then narrow to vein 2 and expanding into a large patch on the tornal area confluent with the curve of the postmedial line. The hindwings are white tinged with ochreous and with a black discoidal spot with an oblique line from it to above the inner margin towards the tornus. The postmedial line is blackish, bent outwards between veins 5 and 2 where it terminates. There is a blackish terminal line expanding into patches at the apex and in the submedian interspace.
