= Syllepte disciselenalis =

Scientific classification
- Kingdom: Animalia
- Phylum: Arthropoda
- Class: Insecta
- Order: Lepidoptera
- Family: Crambidae
- Genus: Syllepte
- Species: S. disciselenalis

Binomial name
- Syllepte disciselenalis (Hampson, 1918)

Synonyms
- Sylepta disciselenalis Hampson, 1918

Species of moth

Syllepte disciselenalis is a moth in the family Crambidae. It was described by George Hampson in 1918. It is found in Malawi.

The wingspan is about 28 mm. The forewings are glossy grey brown with a small pure white discoidal lunule and a white postmedial bar from vein 8 to the discal fold, formed by three conjoined spots, then an indistinct dark line slightly defined on the outer side by whitish, excurved to below vein 3, then retracted to the lower angle of the cell, and excurved above the inner margin. The hindwings are glossy grey brown with a small white postmedial spot at the discal fold, then an indistinct dark postmedial line, faintly defined on the outer side by whitish, slightly bent outwards between veins 5 and 2, then bent inwards to below the end of the cell and somewhat excurved to the inner margin.
