= Syllepte berambalis =

Scientific classification
- Domain: Eukaryota
- Kingdom: Animalia
- Phylum: Arthropoda
- Class: Insecta
- Order: Lepidoptera
- Family: Crambidae
- Genus: Syllepte
- Species: S. berambalis

Binomial name
- Syllepte berambalis (Schaus, 1927)

Synonyms
- Sylepta berambalis Schaus, 1927

Species of moth

Syllepte berambalis is a moth in the family Crambidae. It was described by Schaus in 1927. It is found in the Philippines (Mindanao).
