= Syllepte albirivalis =

Scientific classification
- Kingdom: Animalia
- Phylum: Arthropoda
- Class: Insecta
- Order: Lepidoptera
- Family: Crambidae
- Genus: Syllepte
- Species: S. albirivalis

Binomial name
- Syllepte albirivalis (Hampson, 1912)

Synonyms
- Sylepta albirivalis Hampson, 1912

Species of moth

Syllepte albirivalis is a moth in the family Crambidae. It was described by George Hampson in 1912. It is found in Papua New Guinea.

The wingspan is about 28 mm. The forewings are cupreous brown with an indistinct oblique whitish antemedial line which is slightly defined on the outer side by fuscous. There is a small white spot in the middle of the cell and a discoidal bar defined by fuscous. There is a postmedial white line arising below the costa, its outer edge very slightly waved to vein 5, where it is very slightly bent outwards, at vein 2 bent inwards to below the end of the cell, then slightly excurved. The hindwings are cupreous brown with a slight whitish discoidal lunule defined by fuscous. The postmedial line is white, faintly defined on the inner side by fuscous, very slightly bent outwards at vein 5, at vein 2 bent inwards and almost obsolete to below the end of the cell, then oblique to above the tornus.
