= Syllepte vagalis =

Scientific classification
- Kingdom: Animalia
- Phylum: Arthropoda
- Class: Insecta
- Order: Lepidoptera
- Family: Crambidae
- Genus: Syllepte
- Species: S. vagalis

Binomial name
- Syllepte vagalis (Snellen, 1901)

Synonyms
- Botys vagalis Snellen, 1901

Species of moth

Syllepte vagalis is a moth species in the family Crambidae. It was described by Snellen in 1901. It is found in Indonesia (Java).
