= Syllepte neurogramma =

Scientific classification
- Kingdom: Animalia
- Phylum: Arthropoda
- Class: Insecta
- Order: Lepidoptera
- Family: Crambidae
- Genus: Syllepte
- Species: S. neurogramma

Binomial name
- Syllepte neurogramma (Meyrick, 1939)

Synonyms
- Sylepta neurogramma Meyrick, 1939

Species of moth

Syllepte neurogramma is a moth in the family Crambidae. It was described by Edward Meyrick in 1939. It is found in the Democratic Republic of the Congo (Katanga Province).
