= Syllepte favillacealis =

Scientific classification
- Kingdom: Animalia
- Phylum: Arthropoda
- Class: Insecta
- Order: Lepidoptera
- Family: Crambidae
- Genus: Syllepte
- Species: S. favillacealis

Binomial name
- Syllepte favillacealis (Snellen, 1899)

Synonyms
- Botys favillacealis Snellen, 1899

Species of moth

Syllepte favillacealis is a moth in the family Crambidae. It was described by Snellen in 1899. It is found in Indonesia (Java).
