= Syllepte macarealis =

Scientific classification
- Kingdom: Animalia
- Phylum: Arthropoda
- Class: Insecta
- Order: Lepidoptera
- Family: Crambidae
- Genus: Syllepte
- Species: S. macarealis

Binomial name
- Syllepte macarealis (Schaus, 1927)

Synonyms
- Sylepta macarealis Schaus, 1927

Species of moth

Syllepte macarealis is a moth in the family Crambidae. It was described by William Schaus in 1927. It is found in the island of Mindanao, Philippines.
