= Syllepte leucographalis =

Scientific classification
- Kingdom: Animalia
- Phylum: Arthropoda
- Class: Insecta
- Order: Lepidoptera
- Family: Crambidae
- Genus: Syllepte
- Species: S. leucographalis

Binomial name
- Syllepte leucographalis (Hampson, 1912)

Synonyms
- Sylepta leucographalis Hampson, 1912

Species of moth

Syllepte leucographalis is a moth in the family Crambidae. It was described by George Hampson in 1912. It is found in Indonesia (Bali).

The wingspan is about 30 mm. The forewings are fuscous brown suffused with purple. There is an antemedial white spot in the cell and a whitish band from the cell to the inner margin, as well as quadrate black spots in the middle of the cell and on the discocellulars with a quadrate white spot between them and a smaller spot below the cell. The postmedial line is fuscous, incurved and with a quadrifid yellowish white patch beyond it from the costa to vein 5, bent outwards and slightly defined by white between veins 5 and 2, then retracted to the lower angle of the cell and excurved to the inner margin, with a yellowish-white spot beyond it in the submedian interspace and a small spot above the inner margin. The hindwings are yellowish white with some diffused fuscous below the base of the cell, an oblique fuscous band from the upper angle of the cell to above the tornus and a small dark lunule beyond the cell. The terminal area is fuscous, suffused with purple. There is a postmedial line between veins 5 and 2 slightly defined by whitish on the outer side and retracted at vein 2.
