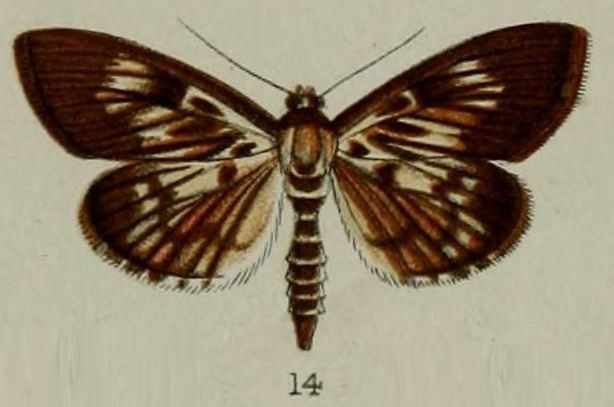
- Syllepte picalis Hampson 1898

Scientific classification
- Kingdom: Animalia
- Phylum: Arthropoda
- Class: Insecta
- Order: Lepidoptera
- Family: Crambidae
- Genus: Syllepte
- Species: S. picalis

Binomial name
- Syllepte picalis (Hampson, 1898)

Synonyms
- Sylepta picalis Hampson, 1898

= Syllepte picalis =

Species of moth

Syllepte picalis is a moth in the family Crambidae. It was described by George Hampson in 1898. It is found in Meghalaya, India.

The wingspan is about 48 mm. The wings are white with the veins strongly streaked with black. The forewings have a black costal area and a black spot near the base of the inner margin. There is an oblique black streak between vein 1 and the middle of the inner margin. There is a short streak below the base of vein 2 and spots on the cell and the discocellulars. The terminal third of the wing is black, tinged with purplish grey. The hindwings have a discoidal black spot and a postmedial line which is excurved between veins 5 and 2.
