= Syllepte atrisquamalis =

Scientific classification
- Kingdom: Animalia
- Phylum: Arthropoda
- Class: Insecta
- Order: Lepidoptera
- Family: Crambidae
- Genus: Syllepte
- Species: S. atrisquamalis

Binomial name
- Syllepte atrisquamalis (Hampson, 1912)

Synonyms
- Sylepta atrisquamalis Hampson, 1912

Species of moth

Syllepte atrisquamalis is a moth in the family Crambidae. It was described by George Hampson in 1912. It is endemic to Tanzania.

The wingspan is about 32 millimetres (1.3 in). The forewings are yellowish white with small spots formed of aggregated black scales beyond the lower angle of the cell below veins 5, 4 and 3. The hindwings are yellowish white with an irroration of large black scales in, beyond and below the end of the cell.
