= Syllepte crenilinealis =

Scientific classification
- Kingdom: Animalia
- Phylum: Arthropoda
- Class: Insecta
- Order: Lepidoptera
- Family: Crambidae
- Genus: Syllepte
- Species: S. crenilinealis

Binomial name
- Syllepte crenilinealis (Hampson, 1918)

Synonyms
- Sylepta crenilinealis Hampson, 1918

Species of moth

Syllepte crenilinealis is a moth in the family Crambidae. It was described by George Hampson in 1918. It is found in Western New Guinea, Indonesia .

The wingspan is about 40 mm. The forewings are pale rufous with a black antemedial line which is obsolescent at the costa, oblique and sinuous to the submedian fold, incurved at vein 1 and oblique to the inner margin. There is a small black spot in the upper part of the middle of the cell and an elliptical discoidal spot. The postmedial line is black, crenulate (scalloped) to below vein 3, then retracted to below the angle of the cell and excurved below the submedian fold. The terminal area is darker reddish brown. The hindwings are white, tinged with rufous. The terminal area is pale reddish brown, narrowing to a point at the submedian fold. There is a small dark spot at the lower angle of the cell and the postmedial line is dark, waved to vein 5, then bent outwards and crenulate to above vein 2, on which it is retracted, then excurved to above the tornus. There is a black-brown terminal line.
