= Syllepte sakarahalis =

Scientific classification
- Domain: Eukaryota
- Kingdom: Animalia
- Phylum: Arthropoda
- Class: Insecta
- Order: Lepidoptera
- Family: Crambidae
- Genus: Syllepte
- Species: S. sakarahalis

Binomial name
- Syllepte sakarahalis (Marion & Viette, 1956)

Synonyms
- Samea sakarahalis Marion & Viette, 1956; Syllepte neodesmialis Klima, 1939

Species of moth

Syllepte sakarahalis is a moth in the family Crambidae. It was described by Hubert Marion and Pierre Viette in 1956. It is endemic to Madagascar.
