= Syllepte phricosticha =

Scientific classification
- Domain: Eukaryota
- Kingdom: Animalia
- Phylum: Arthropoda
- Class: Insecta
- Order: Lepidoptera
- Family: Crambidae
- Genus: Syllepte
- Species: S. phricosticha

Binomial name
- Syllepte phricosticha (Turner, 1908)

Synonyms
- Sylepta phricosticha Turner, 1908

Species of moth

Syllepte phricosticha is a moth in the family Crambidae. It was described by Turner in 1908. It is found in Australia, where it has been recorded from Queensland.

The wingspan is about 32 mm. The forewings are brown or reddish-brown with fuscous markings. There is an obscure slender transverse line and a subcostal dot, as well as two dots placed transversely beneath the mid-costa. There is also a slender acutely dentate line from the costa across the disc, below middle bent abruptly inwards to beneath the median dots, and then downwards to the dorsum just beyond the middle. There is a terminal series of minute dots on the veins. The hindwings have the same colour as the forewings, but are paler towards the base. There are one or two dots representing the basal line and there is an acutely dentate postmedian line, its median third produced towards the termen. The terminal dots and cilia are as the forewings.
