= Syllepte proctizonalis =

Scientific classification
- Kingdom: Animalia
- Phylum: Arthropoda
- Class: Insecta
- Order: Lepidoptera
- Family: Crambidae
- Genus: Syllepte
- Species: S. proctizonalis

Binomial name
- Syllepte proctizonalis (Hampson, 1918)

Synonyms
- Sylepta proctizonalis Hampson, 1918

Species of moth

Syllepte proctizonalis is a moth in the family Crambidae. It was described by George Hampson in 1918. It is found in China.

The wingspan is about 30 mm. The forewings are ochreous yellow, the costal area tinged with rufous towards the base. There is a curved blackish antemedial line, a blackish point in the upper part of the middle of the cell and a black discoidal bar. The postmedial line is black, forming a slight spot at the costa, bent outwards from vein 5 to above 2, then retracted to below the angle of the cell and excurved below the submedian fold. The hindwings are ochreous yellow with an oblique blackish discoidal bar. The postmedial line is black, bent outwards between veins 5 and 2, then retracted to below the angle of the cell and oblique to above the tornus.
