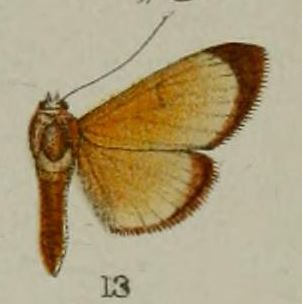
- Sylepta solilucus

Scientific classification
- Kingdom: Animalia
- Phylum: Arthropoda
- Class: Insecta
- Order: Lepidoptera
- Family: Crambidae
- Genus: Syllepte
- Species: S. solilucis

Binomial name
- Syllepte solilucis (Hampson, 1898)

Synonyms
- Sylepta solilucis Hampson, 1898

= Syllepte solilucis =

Species of moth

Syllepte solilucis is a moth in the family Crambidae. It was described by George Hampson in 1898. It is found in Western New Guinea, Indonesia.

The wingspan is about 30 mm. Adults are pale golden yellow, the forewings with the costal area fuscous grey or yellow. The termen is fuscous grey, expanding widely towards the apex. The hindwings have a fuscous-grey terminal line.
