= Syllepte retractalis =

Scientific classification
- Domain: Eukaryota
- Kingdom: Animalia
- Phylum: Arthropoda
- Class: Insecta
- Order: Lepidoptera
- Family: Crambidae
- Genus: Syllepte
- Species: S. retractalis

Binomial name
- Syllepte retractalis (Hampson, 1912)

Synonyms
- Sylepta retractalis Hampson, 1912

Species of moth

Syllepte retractalis is a moth in the family Crambidae. It was described by George Hampson in 1912. It is found in the Democratic Republic of the Congo, Ghana and Ivory Coast.

The wingspan is about 21 millimetres (0.83 in). The forewings are pale yellow, the costa and veins tinged with fulvous. The antemedial line is fuscous and oblique and there is a fuscous discoidal bar. The postmedial line is fuscous, slightly bent outwards between veins 5 and 2, then retracted to the lower angle of the cell, and oblique to the inner margin near the antemedial line. There is a fuscous terminal line. The hindwings are pale yellow with a fuscous discoidal spot and a fuscous postmedial line, bent outwards between veins 5 and 2, then retracted to the lower angle of the cell and oblique to above the tornus. There is also a fuscous terminal line.

The larvae feed on Cola nitida and Theobroma cacao.
