= Syllepte rhyparialis =

Scientific classification
- Domain: Eukaryota
- Kingdom: Animalia
- Phylum: Arthropoda
- Class: Insecta
- Order: Lepidoptera
- Family: Crambidae
- Genus: Syllepte
- Species: S. rhyparialis

Binomial name
- Syllepte rhyparialis (Oberthür, 1893)

Synonyms
- Botys rhyparialis Oberthür, 1893; Syllepte rhyparialis alba South in Leech & South, 1901

Species of moth

Syllepte rhyparialis is a moth in the family Crambidae. It was described by Oberthür in 1893. It is found in China.
