= Syllepte albifurcalis =

Scientific classification
- Domain: Eukaryota
- Kingdom: Animalia
- Phylum: Arthropoda
- Class: Insecta
- Order: Lepidoptera
- Family: Crambidae
- Genus: Syllepte
- Species: S. albifurcalis

Binomial name
- Syllepte albifurcalis Dognin, 1913

Species of moth

Syllepte albifurcalis is a moth in the family Crambidae. It was described by Paul Dognin in 1913. It is found in Colombia.
