= Syllepte dialis =

Scientific classification
- Domain: Eukaryota
- Kingdom: Animalia
- Phylum: Arthropoda
- Class: Insecta
- Order: Lepidoptera
- Family: Crambidae
- Genus: Syllepte
- Species: S. dialis

Binomial name
- Syllepte dialis (Schaus, 1912)

Synonyms
- Sylepta dialis Schaus, 1912

Species of moth

Syllepte dialis is a moth in the family Crambidae. It was described by Schaus in 1912. It is found in Costa Rica.
