= Syllepte distinguenda =

Scientific classification
- Domain: Eukaryota
- Kingdom: Animalia
- Phylum: Arthropoda
- Class: Insecta
- Order: Lepidoptera
- Family: Crambidae
- Genus: Syllepte
- Species: S. distinguenda

Binomial name
- Syllepte distinguenda E. Hering, 1901

Species of moth

Syllepte distinguenda is a moth in the family Crambidae. It was described by Hering in 1901. It is found in Indonesia (Sumatra).
