= Syllepte adductalis =

Scientific classification
- Kingdom: Animalia
- Phylum: Arthropoda
- Class: Insecta
- Order: Lepidoptera
- Family: Crambidae
- Genus: Syllepte
- Species: S. adductalis

Binomial name
- Syllepte adductalis (Walker, 1859)

Synonyms
- Botys adductalis Walker, 1859

Species of moth

Syllepte adductalis is a moth in the family Crambidae. It was described by Francis Walker in 1859. It is found in Sri Lanka and India.

The larvae feed spun up in the leaves of balsam.
