= Syllepte thomealis =

Scientific classification
- Kingdom: Animalia
- Phylum: Arthropoda
- Class: Insecta
- Order: Lepidoptera
- Family: Crambidae
- Genus: Syllepte
- Species: S. thomealis

Binomial name
- Syllepte thomealis (Viette, 1957)

Species of moth

Syllepte thomealis is a moth in the family Crambidae. It was described by Viette in 1957. It is endemic to São Tomé.
