= Syllepte venustalis =

Scientific classification
- Domain: Eukaryota
- Kingdom: Animalia
- Phylum: Arthropoda
- Class: Insecta
- Order: Lepidoptera
- Family: Crambidae
- Genus: Syllepte
- Species: S. venustalis

Binomial name
- Syllepte venustalis (C. Swinhoe, 1894)

Synonyms
- Sylepta venustalis C. Swinhoe, 1894

Species of moth

Syllepte venustalis is a moth in the family Crambidae. It was described by Charles Swinhoe in 1894. It is found in Meghalaya, India.

The wings are dull ochreous, with pale black bands and spots. The forewings with an interior line from the hindmargin at one third, curving round on to the costa near the base. There is a subbasal spot on the hindmargin, a spot within the cell, a larger spot at the end and a discal line of lunular spots joined together from the costa at one-third, curving inwards, then outwards, then bent inwardly to below the outer cell-spot and downwards to the hindmargin just beyond the middle. The hindwings have a discal line with a straight, rather thick band running right through it, leaving the outwardly curved portion of the line only visible. Both wings have a marginal lunular thick line, with the extreme margin ochreous.
