= Syllepte philetalis =

Scientific classification
- Kingdom: Animalia
- Phylum: Arthropoda
- Class: Insecta
- Order: Lepidoptera
- Family: Crambidae
- Genus: Syllepte
- Species: S. philetalis

Binomial name
- Syllepte philetalis (Walker, 1859)

Synonyms
- Botys philetalis Walker, 1859; Botys palmalis C. Felder, R. Felder & Rogenhofer, 1875

Species of moth

Syllepte philetalis is a moth in the family Crambidae. It was described by Francis Walker in 1859. It is found in Brazil (Santarém, Amazonas).
