= Syllepte carbatinalis =

Scientific classification
- Domain: Eukaryota
- Kingdom: Animalia
- Phylum: Arthropoda
- Class: Insecta
- Order: Lepidoptera
- Family: Crambidae
- Genus: Syllepte
- Species: S. carbatinalis

Binomial name
- Syllepte carbatinalis (C. Swinhoe, 1890)

Synonyms
- Pramadea carbatinalis C. Swinhoe, 1890

Species of moth

Syllepte carbatinalis is a moth in the family Crambidae. It was described by Charles Swinhoe in 1890. It is found in Myanmar.

Adults are uniform dark olivaceous brown, the forewings with a brown ringlet in the upper centre of the cell and brown-ringed lunular mark at the upper end. There is a lunular discal yellowish line curving outwards above and bent inwards below, the lunules marked inwardly with dark brown. There are also two small brown patches, one above the other, on the hindmargin just beyond the middle, inside the line where it extends downwards from the bend. A corresponding lunular line is found on the hindwings. It is marked similarly, having a great outward curve in its centre, a yellowish spot inside the cell, with an adjoining brown mark on its inner side. The marginal line of both wings is brown.
