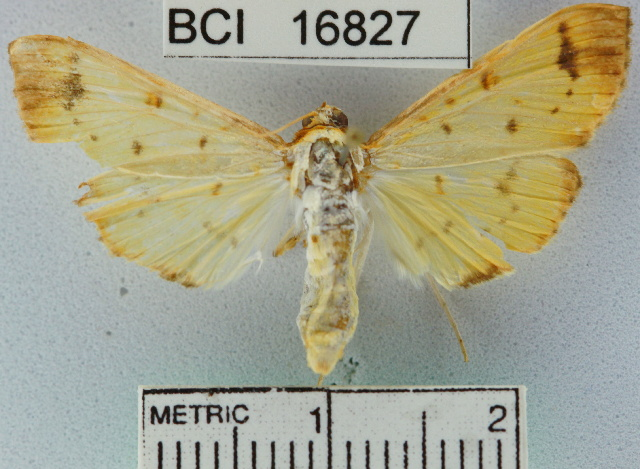

Scientific classification
- Domain: Eukaryota
- Kingdom: Animalia
- Phylum: Arthropoda
- Class: Insecta
- Order: Lepidoptera
- Family: Crambidae
- Genus: Syllepte
- Species: S. amando

Binomial name
- Syllepte amando (Cramer, 1779)

Synonyms
- Botys amando Cramer, 1779; Syllepte amandalis Hübner, 1825; Botys amplalis Guenée, 1854

= Syllepte amando =

Species of moth

Syllepte amando is a moth in the family Crambidae. It was described by Pieter Cramer in 1779. It is found in French Guiana, Suriname, Argentina, Costa Rica, Panama and Cuba.
