= Syllepte cissalis =

Scientific classification
- Domain: Eukaryota
- Kingdom: Animalia
- Phylum: Arthropoda
- Class: Insecta
- Order: Lepidoptera
- Family: Crambidae
- Genus: Syllepte
- Species: S. cissalis

Binomial name
- Syllepte cissalis Yamanaka, 1987

Species of moth

Syllepte cissalis is a moth in the family Crambidae. It was described by Hiroshi Yamanaka in 1987. It is found in Honshu, Japan.
