= Syllepte ningpoalis =

Scientific classification
- Domain: Eukaryota
- Kingdom: Animalia
- Phylum: Arthropoda
- Class: Insecta
- Order: Lepidoptera
- Family: Crambidae
- Genus: Syllepte
- Species: S. ningpoalis

Binomial name
- Syllepte ningpoalis (Leech, 1889)

Synonyms
- Botys ningpoalis Leech, 1889

Species of moth

Syllepte ningpoalis is a moth in the family Crambidae. It was described by John Henry Leech in 1889. It is found in China.

The wingspan is about 32 mm. The forewings are fuscous brown with a pale yellow quadrate spot about the middle of the wing towards the costa, followed by a large irregular-shaped blotch of the same colour, beyond which are two colon-like dots. The central portion of the costa is orange. The hindwings are fuscous brown, rather paler along the inner margin.
