= Syllepte kayei =

Scientific classification
- Domain: Eukaryota
- Kingdom: Animalia
- Phylum: Arthropoda
- Class: Insecta
- Order: Lepidoptera
- Family: Crambidae
- Genus: Syllepte
- Species: S. kayei

Binomial name
- Syllepte kayei (Klima, 1939)

Synonyms
- Sylepta kayei Kaye, 1939; Sylepta seminigralis Kaye, 1925; Syllepte seminigralis

Species of moth

Syllepte kayei is a moth in the family Crambidae. It was described by A. Klima in 1939. It is found in Trinidad.
