= Syllepte albicostalis =

Scientific classification
- Domain: Eukaryota
- Kingdom: Animalia
- Phylum: Arthropoda
- Class: Insecta
- Order: Lepidoptera
- Family: Crambidae
- Genus: Syllepte
- Species: S. albicostalis

Binomial name
- Syllepte albicostalis (Schaus, 1920)

Synonyms
- Sylepta albicostalis Schaus, 1920

Species of moth

Syllepte albicostalis is a moth in the family Crambidae. It was described by William Schaus in 1920. It is found in Guatemala.

The wingspan is about 46 mm. The forewingsare grey shot with blue. The apex is narrowly white. The hindwings are grey, the costal margin for two thirds from the base broadly white, extending beyond the anterior half of the cell.
