= Syllepte laticalis =

Scientific classification
- Domain: Eukaryota
- Kingdom: Animalia
- Phylum: Arthropoda
- Class: Insecta
- Order: Lepidoptera
- Family: Crambidae
- Genus: Syllepte
- Species: S. laticalis

Binomial name
- Syllepte laticalis (Lederer, 1863)

Synonyms
- Botys laticalis Lederer, 1863

Species of moth

Syllepte laticalis is a moth in the family Crambidae. It is found in Venezuela.
