= Syllepte heliochroa =

Scientific classification
- Kingdom: Animalia
- Phylum: Arthropoda
- Class: Insecta
- Order: Lepidoptera
- Family: Crambidae
- Genus: Syllepte
- Species: S. heliochroa

Binomial name
- Syllepte heliochroa (Hampson, 1912)

Synonyms
- Sylepta heliochroa Hampson, 1912

Species of moth

Syllepte heliochroa is a moth in the family Crambidae. It was described by George Hampson in 1912. It is endemic to Papua New Guinea.

The wingspan is about 30 millimetres (1.2 in). The forewings are very pale yellow, with a whitish costa. The termen has a faint dark shade expanding at the apex. The hindwings are very pale yellow.
