= Syllepte seminigralis =

Scientific classification
- Domain: Eukaryota
- Kingdom: Animalia
- Phylum: Arthropoda
- Class: Insecta
- Order: Lepidoptera
- Family: Crambidae
- Genus: Syllepte
- Species: S. seminigralis

Binomial name
- Syllepte seminigralis (Warren, 1896)

Synonyms
- Polycorys seminigralis Warren, 1896

Species of moth

Syllepte seminigralis is a moth in the family Crambidae. It was described by William Warren in 1896. It is found in Meghalaya, India.

Their wingspan is about 36 mm. Their forewings are greyish fuscous, dusted with dark fuscous. Their first line is found near the base. It is dark fuscous, angled in the middle, the lower arm vertical. The orbicular stigma is round and the renitorm lunate and obliquely curved. Both are dark edged, with a centre of the ground colour. The second line is distinct, blackish, dentate and starts at the costa at about two-thirds. It is vertical for its first third, vertical but slightly nearer the hind margin in the middle and slightly oblique, without denticulations and strongly marked above the inner margin. There is a row of black dashes along the hind margin, separated by pale veins. From the inner margin near base, a dark suffusion extends to the hind margin below the apex, embracing the whole outer half of the wing except for the paler edging of the second line. The hindwings have a blackish cell spot. The second and marginal lines are as in forewings.
