= Syllepte abyssalis =

Scientific classification
- Kingdom: Animalia
- Phylum: Arthropoda
- Class: Insecta
- Order: Lepidoptera
- Family: Crambidae
- Genus: Syllepte
- Species: S. abyssalis

Binomial name
- Syllepte abyssalis (Snellen, 1892)

Synonyms
- Epherema abyssalis Snellen, 1892

Species of moth

Syllepte abyssalis is a moth in the family Crambidae. It was described by Snellen in 1892. It is found in New Guinea, Indonesia (Java, Ambon Island) and Australia, where it has been recorded from Queensland.
