= Syllepte cathanalis =

Scientific classification
- Domain: Eukaryota
- Kingdom: Animalia
- Phylum: Arthropoda
- Class: Insecta
- Order: Lepidoptera
- Family: Crambidae
- Genus: Syllepte
- Species: S. cathanalis

Binomial name
- Syllepte cathanalis (Schaus, 1927)

Synonyms
- Sylepta cathanalis Schaus, 1927

Species of moth

Syllepte cathanalis is a moth in the family of Crambidae. It was described by Schaus in 1927. It is found in the Philippines (Luzon, Mindanao).
