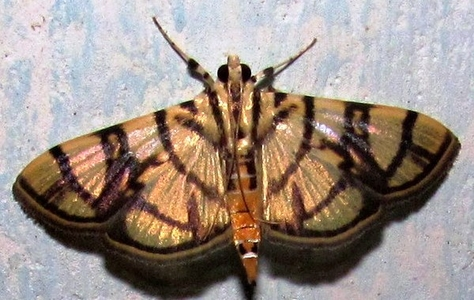

Scientific classification
- Kingdom: Animalia
- Phylum: Arthropoda
- Class: Insecta
- Order: Lepidoptera
- Family: Crambidae
- Genus: Syllepte
- Species: S. gastralis

Binomial name
- Syllepte gastralis (Walker, 1866)

Synonyms
- Glyphodes gastralis Walker, 1866

= Syllepte gastralis =

Species of moth

Syllepte gastralis is a moth in the family Crambidae. It was described by Francis Walker in 1866. It is found in India (Darjeeling, Sikkim, Assam) and Bhutan.

The wingspan is about 36 mm. The forewings have the subbasal line broken up into two spots. There is a pale discocellular lunule and the medial line is angled outwards above the inner margin, so that it approaches or joins the oblique line and also gives off a fascia to join the antemedial line. There is a brown fascia connecting the submarginal with the marginal band above the middle. The submarginal band on the hindwings sends a spur inwards along vein 2 towards the medial line.
