= Syllepte tenebrosalis =

Scientific classification
- Domain: Eukaryota
- Kingdom: Animalia
- Phylum: Arthropoda
- Class: Insecta
- Order: Lepidoptera
- Family: Crambidae
- Genus: Syllepte
- Species: S. tenebrosalis

Binomial name
- Syllepte tenebrosalis (Warren, 1896)

Synonyms
- Notarcha tenebrosalis Warren, 1896

Species of moth

Syllepte tenebrosalis is a moth in the family Crambidae. It is found in Australia, where it has been recorded from Queensland.

The wingspan is about 40 millimetres (1.6 in). The forewings are dark bronzy fuscous, with the stigmata and lines indicated only by slightly paler yellowish edgings. There is a large subquadrate brown spot at the end of the cell, preceded by a roundish flattened one. The space between and on either side slightly paler and yellowish. The exterior line is dentate and indicated by the whitish-yellow spaces at the end of each tooth. The hindwings have the whitish markings more clear. There is one clear whitish spot opposite the cell, and the rest of the exterior line is clearly denticulate.
