= Syllepte trachelota =

Scientific classification
- Domain: Eukaryota
- Kingdom: Animalia
- Phylum: Arthropoda
- Class: Insecta
- Order: Lepidoptera
- Family: Crambidae
- Genus: Syllepte
- Species: S. trachelota

Binomial name
- Syllepte trachelota (Turner, 1913)

Synonyms
- Sylepta trachelota Turner, 1913

Species of moth

Syllepte trachelota is a moth in the family Crambidae described by Alfred Jefferis Turner in 1913. It is found in Australia, where it has been recorded from Queensland.

The wingspan is 30–38 mm. The forewings are bright ferruginous mixed with ochreous yellow and with dark-fuscous markings. There is a sub-basal dorsal dot, a waved transverse line and a round subcostal dot, as well as a transverse median subcostal mark in the disc. A line starts at the costa. It is irregularly dentate, displaced outwards in the middle, then bent inwards to beneath the discal mark, and again bent to the mid-dorsum. There is a broad fuscous terminal band touching the posterior line. There is a series of dark-fuscous terminal dots on the veins. The hindwings are fuscous, suffused with ferruginous. There is an oblique dark fuscous mark towards the costa and a postmedian line which is displaced outwards in the middle and edged posteriorly with ochreous. The terminal dots and cilia are as on the forewings.
