= Syllepte lanatalis =

Scientific classification
- Kingdom: Animalia
- Phylum: Arthropoda
- Class: Insecta
- Order: Lepidoptera
- Family: Crambidae
- Genus: Syllepte
- Species: S. lanatalis

Binomial name
- Syllepte lanatalis Viette, 1960

Species of moth

Syllepte lanatalis is a moth in the family Crambidae. It was described by Viette in 1960. It is found in Madagascar.

It's got a wingspan of 31-34mm.
