= Syllepte fulviceps =

Scientific classification
- Kingdom: Animalia
- Phylum: Arthropoda
- Class: Insecta
- Order: Lepidoptera
- Family: Crambidae
- Genus: Syllepte
- Species: S. fulviceps

Binomial name
- Syllepte fulviceps Bethune-Baker, 1909

Species of moth

Syllepte fulviceps is a moth in the family Crambidae. It was described by George Thomas Bethune-Baker in 1909. It is found in the Democratic Republic of the Congo (Orientale).

The wingspan is about 38 mm. Both wings are uniform pale slate-grey.
