= Syllepte purpuralis =

Scientific classification
- Kingdom: Animalia
- Phylum: Arthropoda
- Class: Insecta
- Order: Lepidoptera
- Family: Crambidae
- Genus: Syllepte
- Species: S. purpuralis

Binomial name
- Syllepte purpuralis (Walker, 1866)

Synonyms
- Botys purpuralis Walker, 1866

Species of moth

Syllepte purpuralis is a moth in the family Crambidae. It was described by Francis Walker in 1866. It is found in Colombia.
