= Syllepte secreta =

Scientific classification
- Kingdom: Animalia
- Phylum: Arthropoda
- Class: Insecta
- Order: Lepidoptera
- Family: Crambidae
- Genus: Syllepte
- Species: S. secreta

Binomial name
- Syllepte secreta (Meyrick, 1936)

Synonyms
- Sylepta secreta Meyrick, 1936

Species of moth

Syllepte secreta is a moth in the family Crambidae. It was described by Edward Meyrick in 1936. It is found in the Democratic Republic of the Congo.
