= Syllepte orbiferalis =

Scientific classification
- Kingdom: Animalia
- Phylum: Arthropoda
- Class: Insecta
- Order: Lepidoptera
- Family: Crambidae
- Genus: Syllepte
- Species: S. orbiferalis

Binomial name
- Syllepte orbiferalis (Hampson, 1898)

Synonyms
- Sylepta orbiferalis Hampson, 1898

Species of moth

Syllepte orbiferalis is a moth in the family Crambidae. It was described by George Hampson in 1898. It is found on Réunion and in South Africa.

The wingspan is about 36 mm. The forewings are pale greyish fuscous with a yellowish tinge, the forewings with an obscure oblique antemedial dark line defined by whitish on the inner side and almost obsolete towards the costa. There is a white orbicular spot and a large lunulate discoidal spot. The postmedial line has three conjoined dentate white marks on the outer edge below the costa, excurved and more or less strongly defined by white between veins 5 and 2, then retracted to near the base of vein 2 and with a white spot in the angle. The hindwings have a prominent white discoidal spot. The postmedial line is strongly bent outwards between veins 5 and 2, then retracted to near the angle of the cell and terminating on the inner margin above the tornus, more or less strongly defined by white on the outer side, usually expanding into a dentate patch below the costa.
