= Syllepte microstictalis =

Scientific classification
- Kingdom: Animalia
- Phylum: Arthropoda
- Class: Insecta
- Order: Lepidoptera
- Family: Crambidae
- Genus: Syllepte
- Species: S. microstictalis

Binomial name
- Syllepte microstictalis (Hampson, 1918)

Synonyms
- Sylepta microstictalis Hampson, 1918

Species of moth

Syllepte microstictalis is a moth in the family Crambidae. It was described by George Hampson in 1918. It is found in Cameroon.

The wingspan is about 28 mm. The forewings are dark brown with a cupreous gloss and a faint curved dark antemedial line with a slight whitish spot before it in the cell. There is a small quadrate white spot in the end of the cell defined on each side by black-brown. There is also a slight whitish postmedial bar from below the costa to the discal fold, then a very faint dark line, retracted to below the angle of the cell, then excurved. The hindwings are dark brown with a cupreous gloss and a fine pale line at the base of the cilia followed by a dark line.
