= Syllepte anchuralis =

Scientific classification
- Domain: Eukaryota
- Kingdom: Animalia
- Phylum: Arthropoda
- Class: Insecta
- Order: Lepidoptera
- Family: Crambidae
- Genus: Syllepte
- Species: S. anchuralis

Binomial name
- Syllepte anchuralis (Schaus, 1920)

Synonyms
- Sylepta anchuralis Schaus, 1920

Species of moth

Syllepte anchuralis is a moth in the family Crambidae. It was described by William Schaus in 1920. It is found in Guatemala.

The wingspan is about 29 mm. There is a small antemedial hyaline spot below the cell on the forewings, with darker brown shading on either side. There is also a short semihyaline streak from the subcostal near the end of the cell, and a similar streak below it from vein 2 to the submedian fold, both darker edged on either side. There are two semihyaline points beyond the cell between veins 5 and 7. These are more heavily edged with dark brown. Two larger spots are slightly outset between veins 3 and 5, their outer edge indentate on vein 4, and only dark edged outwardly. There are also faint terminal spots on the interspaces. The hindwings are more thinly scaled, whitish at the base and on the inner margin. There is a semihyaline small spot with a dark edge beyond the discocellular, as well as a faint postmedial line and an interrupted dark terminal line.
