= Syllepte ruricolalis =

Scientific classification
- Kingdom: Animalia
- Phylum: Arthropoda
- Class: Insecta
- Order: Lepidoptera
- Family: Crambidae
- Genus: Syllepte
- Species: S. ruricolalis

Binomial name
- Syllepte ruricolalis (Snellen, 1880)

Synonyms
- Botys ruricolalis Snellen, 1880

Species of moth

Syllepte ruricolalis is a moth species in the family Crambidae. It was described by Snellen in 1880. It is found in Indonesia (Sulawesi).
