= Syllepte ochrifusalis =

Scientific classification
- Kingdom: Animalia
- Phylum: Arthropoda
- Class: Insecta
- Order: Lepidoptera
- Family: Crambidae
- Genus: Syllepte
- Species: S. ochrifusalis

Binomial name
- Syllepte ochrifusalis (Hampson, 1899)

Synonyms
- Sylepta ochrifusalis Hampson, 1899

Species of moth

Syllepte ochrifusalis is a moth in the family Crambidae. It was described by George Hampson in 1899. It is found in Papua New Guinea, where it has been recorded from the D'Entrecasteaux Islands (Fergusson Island).

The wingspan is 28–30 mm. Adults are white, the forewings suffused with ochreous, except the cell and median part of the inner area. There are slight fuscous marks at the base. There is an antemedial line angled outwards on the median nervure, inwards in the submedian interspace and outwards on vein 1. There is a slight discoidal black lunule. The postmedial line is indistinct, bent outwards and minutely dentate between veins 5 and 3, then retracted and angled outwards again. The hindwings are suffused with ochreous to the postmedial line, except on the costa and inner margin. There is a black discoidal spot and the post medial line is bent outwards between veins 5 and 2. There is some fuscous suffusion on the termen between vein 2 and the tornus.
