= Syllepte phaeophlebalis =

Scientific classification
- Kingdom: Animalia
- Phylum: Arthropoda
- Class: Insecta
- Order: Lepidoptera
- Family: Crambidae
- Genus: Syllepte
- Species: S. phaeophlebalis

Binomial name
- Syllepte phaeophlebalis (Hampson, 1912)

Synonyms
- Sylepta phaeophlebalis Hampson, 1912

Species of moth

Syllepte phaeophlebalis is a moth in the family Crambidae. It was described by George Hampson in 1912. It is found in Peru.

The wingspan is about 34 mm. Adults are white, the forewings with rather diffused brown streaks on the veins, stronger on the subcostal and median nervures and veins 8, 7, 4 and 1. The hindwings have faint brown streaks on the median nervure and veins 5 to 1.
