= Syllepte mesoleucalis =

Scientific classification
- Domain: Eukaryota
- Kingdom: Animalia
- Phylum: Arthropoda
- Class: Insecta
- Order: Lepidoptera
- Family: Crambidae
- Genus: Syllepte
- Species: S. mesoleucalis

Binomial name
- Syllepte mesoleucalis (Hampson, 1898)

Synonyms
- Sylepta mesoleucalis Hampson, 1898

Species of moth

Syllepte mesoleucalis is a moth in the family Crambidae. It was described by George Hampson in 1898. It is endemic to South Africa.

The wingspan is about 30 millimetres (1.2 in). The wings are yellowish white, thickly irrorated (sprinkled) and suffused with fuscous grey. The forewings have a curved black antemedial line and a sinuous postmedial line excurved from the costa to vein 3, then bent inwards to vein 2 and oblique to the inner margin. The area between the two lines is without the fuscous irroration or suffusion from the costa to vein 2. There is a pale centered discoidal stigma. The hindwings have a pale costal area and cell, from the base to the black postmedial line. This line has pale with marks on the outer side. There is a discoidal black spot.
