= Syllepte disticta =

Scientific classification
- Kingdom: Animalia
- Phylum: Arthropoda
- Class: Insecta
- Order: Lepidoptera
- Family: Crambidae
- Genus: Syllepte
- Species: S. disticta

Binomial name
- Syllepte disticta (Hampson, 1912)

Synonyms
- Sylepta disticta Hampson, 1912

Species of moth

Syllepte disticta is a moth in the family Crambidae. It was described by George Hampson in 1912. It is found in Papua New Guinea.

The wingspan is about 32 mm. The forewings are fuscous brown with a purplish-grey gloss and with small white postmedial spots above and below vein 7. There is a punctiform (dotted) white line at the base of the cilia. The hindwings are fuscous brown with a cupreous gloss and with a fine white line at the base of the cilia.
