= Syllepte phaeopleura =

Scientific classification
- Kingdom: Animalia
- Phylum: Arthropoda
- Class: Insecta
- Order: Lepidoptera
- Family: Crambidae
- Genus: Syllepte
- Species: S. phaeopleura

Binomial name
- Syllepte phaeopleura (Turner, 1922)

Synonyms
- Sylepta phaeopleura Turner, 1922

Species of moth

Syllepte phaeopleura is a moth in the family Crambidae. It is found in Australia, where it has been recorded from Queensland.

The wingspan is about 20 mm. The forewings are brown-whitish with dark-fuscous markings. There is a costal streak throughout, interrupted by four pale dots in the terminal area, with a slight discal projection, and a larger acute blackish projection in the middle. There is an incomplete fine curved line and a finely dentate line from the costa, bent inwards between veins 2 and 3, and again at right angles to the end on the dorsum. There is a terminal series of blackish dots on the veins. The hindwings are as the forewings, but without the costal streak and first line. The second line is not dentate, and succeeded by some fuscous suffusion.
