= Syllepte microsema =

Scientific classification
- Domain: Eukaryota
- Kingdom: Animalia
- Phylum: Arthropoda
- Class: Insecta
- Order: Lepidoptera
- Family: Crambidae
- Genus: Syllepte
- Species: S. microsema

Binomial name
- Syllepte microsema (Hampson, 1912)

Synonyms
- Sylepta microsema Hampson, 1912

Species of moth

Syllepte microsema is a moth in the family Crambidae. It was described by George Hampson in 1912. It is found in Sri Lanka, Singapore and Papua New Guinea.

The wingspan is about 28 millimetres (1.1 in). The forewings are brown with a slight cupreous tinge. The antemedial line is indistinct, dark, oblique, from the costa to the median nervure, then more erect. There is a pale point in the middle of the cell and a slight whitish discoidal lunule both defined by dark brown. The postmedial line is dark brown, slightly incurved below the costa and oblique to vein 2, then retracted to below the end of the cell and excurved at vein 1. The hindwings are brown with a slight cupreous gloss and with a faint dark discoidal bar. The postmedial line is very indistinct, dark, slightly excurved between veins 5 and 2, then retracted to below the end of the cell and oblique to above the tornus.
