= Syllepte leopardalis =

Scientific classification
- Domain: Eukaryota
- Kingdom: Animalia
- Phylum: Arthropoda
- Class: Insecta
- Order: Lepidoptera
- Family: Crambidae
- Genus: Syllepte
- Species: S. leopardalis

Binomial name
- Syllepte leopardalis (Moore, 1888)

Synonyms
- Botyodes leopardalis Moore, 1888

Species of moth

Syllepte leopardalis is a moth in the family Crambidae. It was described by Frederic Moore in 1888. It is found in Darjeeling, India.
