= Syllepte vohilavalis =

Scientific classification
- Kingdom: Animalia
- Phylum: Arthropoda
- Class: Insecta
- Order: Lepidoptera
- Family: Crambidae
- Genus: Syllepte
- Species: S. vohilavalis

Binomial name
- Syllepte vohilavalis (Viette, 1954)

Synonyms
- Entephria vohilavalis Viette, 1954; Pycnarmon vohilavalis

Species of moth

Syllepte vohilavalis is a moth in the family Crambidae. It was described by Viette in 1954. It is found in Madagascar.
