= Syllepte molybdopasta =

Scientific classification
- Kingdom: Animalia
- Phylum: Arthropoda
- Class: Insecta
- Order: Lepidoptera
- Family: Crambidae
- Genus: Syllepte
- Species: S. molybdopasta

Binomial name
- Syllepte molybdopasta (Hampson, 1918)

Synonyms
- Sylepta molybdopasta Hampson, 1918

Species of moth

Syllepte molybdopasta is a moth in the family Crambidae. It was described by George Hampson in 1918. It is found in Papua New Guinea, where it has been recorded from Rook Island in the Bismarck Archipelago.

The wingspan is about 38 mm. Adults are grey brown with a leaden gloss, the forewings glossy grey brown with a dark discoidal bar. The postmedial line is indistinct and brown, faintly defined on the outer side by whitish, excurved and very slightly waved from vein 6 to 2, then retracted to below the angle of the cell and erect to the inner margin. The hindwings are glossy grey brown.
