= Syllepte satanas =

Scientific classification
- Domain: Eukaryota
- Kingdom: Animalia
- Phylum: Arthropoda
- Class: Insecta
- Order: Lepidoptera
- Family: Crambidae
- Genus: Syllepte
- Species: S. satanas

Binomial name
- Syllepte satanas (E. Hering, 1901)

Synonyms
- Sylepta satanas E. Hering, 1901

Species of moth

Syllepte satanas is a moth species in the family Crambidae. It was described by Hering in 1901. It is found in Indonesia (Sumatra).
