= Syllepte straminea =

Scientific classification
- Domain: Eukaryota
- Kingdom: Animalia
- Phylum: Arthropoda
- Class: Insecta
- Order: Lepidoptera
- Family: Crambidae
- Genus: Syllepte
- Species: S. straminea

Binomial name
- Syllepte straminea (Butler, 1875)

Synonyms
- Botys straminea Butler, 1875

Species of moth

Syllepte straminea is a moth in the family Crambidae. It was described by Arthur Gardiner Butler in 1875. It is found in South Africa, where it has been recorded from KwaZulu-Natal.
