= Syllepte penthodes =

Scientific classification
- Kingdom: Animalia
- Phylum: Arthropoda
- Class: Insecta
- Order: Lepidoptera
- Family: Crambidae
- Genus: Syllepte
- Species: S. penthodes

Binomial name
- Syllepte penthodes (Meyrick, 1902)

Synonyms
- Notarcha penthodes Meyrick, 1902

Species of moth

Syllepte penthodes is a moth in the family Crambidae. It was described by Edward Meyrick in 1902. It is found on the Maldives in the Indian Ocean.
