= Syllepte pogonodes =

Scientific classification
- Kingdom: Animalia
- Phylum: Arthropoda
- Class: Insecta
- Order: Lepidoptera
- Family: Crambidae
- Genus: Syllepte
- Species: S. pogonodes

Binomial name
- Syllepte pogonodes (Hampson, 1899)

Synonyms
- Sylepta pogonodes Hampson, 1899

Species of moth

Syllepte pogonodes is a moth in the family Crambidae. It was described by George Hampson in 1899. It is found in Indonesia (Batchian, Ambon Island).

The wingspan is about 30 mm. Adults are yellow, the forewings with slight rufous marks at the base and an antemedial line oblique from the costa to below the median nervure, where it is angled, then angled inwards on vein 1. There is a speck in the cell and a discoidal lunule. The postmedial line is broad and irregular, nearly straight from the costa to vein 2, then bent inwards to below the angle of the cell, and with patches between it and the lower angle of the cell. The termen is rather broadly rufous, diffused inward to the postmedial line in the middle. The hindwings have an indistinct postmedial line, bent outwards between veins 5 and 2. The terminal area is suffused with brown and the tufts at the tornus are brown.
