= Syllepte birdalis =

Scientific classification
- Domain: Eukaryota
- Kingdom: Animalia
- Phylum: Arthropoda
- Class: Insecta
- Order: Lepidoptera
- Family: Crambidae
- Genus: Syllepte
- Species: S. birdalis

Binomial name
- Syllepte birdalis (Schaus, 1920)

Synonyms
- Sylepta birdalis Schaus, 1920

Species of moth

Syllepte birdalis is a moth in the family Crambidae. It was described by William Schaus in 1920. It is found in Venezuela.

The wingspan is about 31 mm. The costal and inner margins to postmedial line on the forewings are ochreous yellow and there is a dark costal spot at the base, as well as a subbasal dark point on the inner margin. There are traces of an outbent antemedial smoky line from the subcostal, followed in the cell by a small double spot. There is also a lilacine line on the discocellular, edged by fuscous lines. The postmedial line is fuscous and the terminal space beyond this line is lilacine brown. The hindwings have a smoky line on the discocellular. The postmedial line is fine, forming three lunules to vein 2 where it is upbent, then angled and straight to the inner margin. There is a lilacine brown shade at the apex.
