= Syllepte xylocraspis =

Scientific classification
- Kingdom: Animalia
- Phylum: Arthropoda
- Class: Insecta
- Order: Lepidoptera
- Family: Crambidae
- Genus: Syllepte
- Species: S. xylocraspis

Binomial name
- Syllepte xylocraspis (Hampson, 1912)

Synonyms
- Sylepta xylocraspis Hampson, 1912

Species of moth

Syllepte xylocraspis is a moth in the family Crambidae. It was described by George Hampson in 1912. It is found in South Africa.

The wingspan is 32–34 mm. The forewings are orange-yellow, the costa tinged with fulvous. There is a broad terminal red-brown band and an indistinct curved brown antemedial line, as well as a small brown spot in the middle of the cell and larger discoidal spot. The postmedial line is brown, strong and obliquely incurved from the costa to the terminal band at vein 5, at vein 2 retracted to below the end of the cell and erect to the inner margin. The hindwings are orange-yellow with a broad brown terminal band. There is an oblique brown discoidal striga and the postmedial line is brown, rather strong, excurved between veins 5 and 2.
