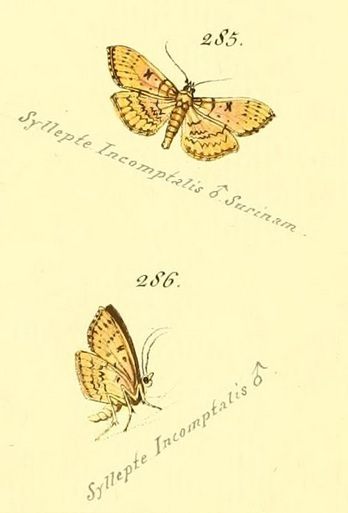

Scientific classification
- Kingdom: Animalia
- Phylum: Arthropoda
- Clade: Pancrustacea
- Class: Insecta
- Order: Lepidoptera
- Family: Crambidae
- Genus: Syllepte
- Species: S. incomptalis

Binomial name
- Syllepte incomptalis Hübner, 1823

Synonyms
- Pantographa cybelealis Druce; Pantographa idmonalis Druce, 1895

= Syllepte incomptalis =

Species of moth

Syllepte incomptalis is a moth in the family Crambidae, described by Jacob Hübner in 1823. It lives in Suriname, Venezuela, Brazil, Costa Rica and Mexico.
