= Syllepte curiusalis =

Scientific classification
- Kingdom: Animalia
- Phylum: Arthropoda
- Class: Insecta
- Order: Lepidoptera
- Family: Crambidae
- Genus: Syllepte
- Species: S. curiusalis

Binomial name
- Syllepte curiusalis (Walker, 1859)

Synonyms
- Botys curiusalis Walker, 1859

Species of moth

Syllepte curiusalis is a moth in the family Crambidae. It was described by Francis Walker in 1859. It is found on Borneo.
