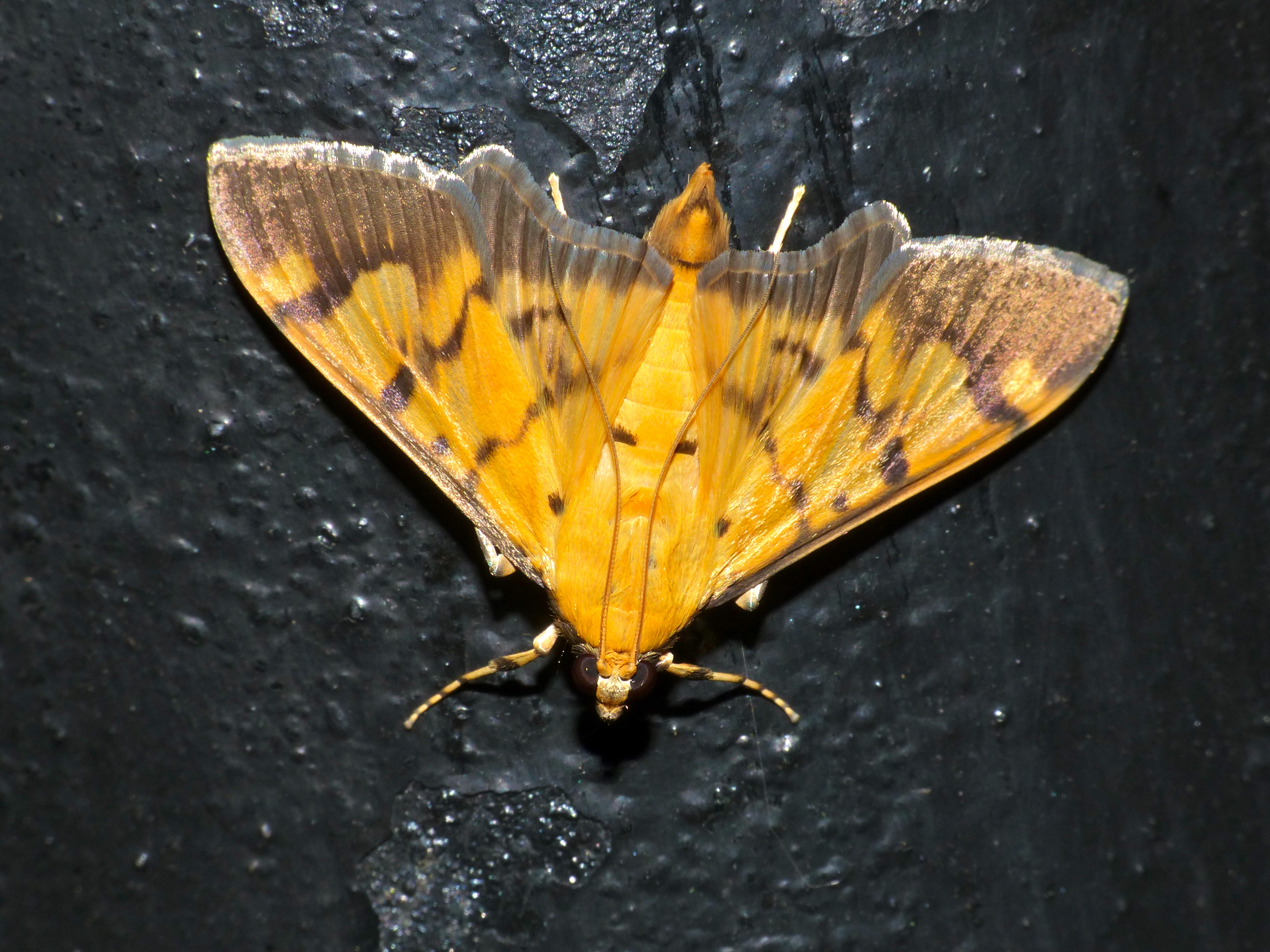
- Crambid Moth (Syllepte fabiusalis)

Scientific classification
- Kingdom: Animalia
- Phylum: Arthropoda
- Class: Insecta
- Order: Lepidoptera
- Family: Crambidae
- Genus: Syllepte
- Species: S. fabiusalis

Binomial name
- Syllepte fabiusalis (Walker, 1859)

Synonyms
- Botys fabiusalis Walker, 1859; Sylepta fabiusalis mokanalis Caradja, 1932

= Syllepte fabiusalis =

Species of moth

Syllepte fabiusalis is a moth in the family Crambidae. It was described by Francis Walker in 1859. It is found on Borneo and in Zhejiang, China and the Philippines.
