= Syllepte melanopalis =

Scientific classification
- Domain: Eukaryota
- Kingdom: Animalia
- Phylum: Arthropoda
- Class: Insecta
- Order: Lepidoptera
- Family: Crambidae
- Genus: Syllepte
- Species: S. melanopalis

Binomial name
- Syllepte melanopalis (Hampson, 1908)

Synonyms
- Sylepta melanopalis Hampson, 1908

Species of moth

Syllepte melanopalis is a moth in the family Crambidae. It was described by George Hampson in 1908. It is endemic to Mayotte in the Indian Ocean off the coast of southeast Africa.

The wingspan is about 24 millimetres (0.94 in). Adults are fuscous brown with a slight cupreous gloss, the forewings with a dark antemedial line, with a white band on the inner side, excurved from the costa to the submedian fold, then slightly incurved. There is a black spot in the middle of the cell and a discoidal lunule, with a white spot before the former and rather quadrate spot between them. The postmedial line is dark, with a white band on the outer edge expanding into a triangular patch towards the costa and a small spot below vein 2, incurved from the costa to vein 5, excurved to vein 2, then retracted towards the lower angle of the cell and again excurved. The hindwings have an oblique blackish discoidal bar and a dark postmedial line, with a white band on its outer edge, bent outwards between veins 5 and 2, then retracted towards the angle of the cell and slightly angled outwards at vein 1.
