= Syllepte monoleuca =

Scientific classification
- Kingdom: Animalia
- Phylum: Arthropoda
- Class: Insecta
- Order: Lepidoptera
- Family: Crambidae
- Genus: Syllepte
- Species: S. monoleuca

Binomial name
- Syllepte monoleuca (Hampson, 1912)

Synonyms
- Sylepta monoleuca Hampson, 1912

Species of moth

Syllepte monoleuca is a moth in the family Crambidae. It was described by George Hampson in 1912. It is found in Papua New Guinea.

The wingspan is about 28 mm. The forewings are uniform black brown with a cupreous tinge. The hindwings are black brown with a cupreous tinge, with a rather quadrate white spot beyond the lower angle of the cell.
