= Syllepte paucistrialis =

Scientific classification
- Domain: Eukaryota
- Kingdom: Animalia
- Phylum: Arthropoda
- Class: Insecta
- Order: Lepidoptera
- Family: Crambidae
- Genus: Syllepte
- Species: S. paucistrialis

Binomial name
- Syllepte paucistrialis (Warren, 1896)

Synonyms
- Cyclarcha paucistrialis Warren, 1896

Species of moth

Syllepte paucistrialis is a moth in the family Crambidae. It was described by William Warren in 1896. It is found in India (Meghalaya).

The wingspan is about 20 mm. The forewings are pale straw-colour with a dark grey discal spot and an indistinct curved dark grey line beyond the middle, not reaching the costa and ill-defined towards the inner margin, containing a dark spot on the subcostal and another on the first median nervule, followed by three or four dark grey dashes, indicating a submarginal line. The hindwings have a smaller discal dot and dark grey submarginal line, not reaching either the costa or the inner margin.
