= Syllepte planeflava =

Scientific classification
- Kingdom: Animalia
- Phylum: Arthropoda
- Class: Insecta
- Order: Lepidoptera
- Family: Crambidae
- Genus: Syllepte
- Species: S. planeflava

Binomial name
- Syllepte planeflava (Hampson, 1912)

Synonyms
- Sylepta planeflava Hampson, 1912

Species of moth

Syllepte planeflava is a moth in the family Crambidae. It was described by George Hampson in 1912. It is found in Papua New Guinea.

The wingspan is about 34 mm. The forewings are yellow with faint traces of a deeper yellow antemedial line, discoidal bar and postmedial line oblique below the discal fold. The hindwings are paler yellow.
