= Syllepte lucidalis =

Scientific classification
- Domain: Eukaryota
- Kingdom: Animalia
- Phylum: Arthropoda
- Class: Insecta
- Order: Lepidoptera
- Family: Crambidae
- Genus: Syllepte
- Species: S. lucidalis

Binomial name
- Syllepte lucidalis Caradja, 1925

Species of moth

Syllepte lucidalis is a moth in the family Crambidae. It was described by Aristide Caradja in 1925. It is found in China.
