= Syllepte stumpffalis =

Scientific classification
- Kingdom: Animalia
- Phylum: Arthropoda
- Class: Insecta
- Order: Lepidoptera
- Family: Crambidae
- Genus: Syllepte
- Species: S. stumpffalis

Binomial name
- Syllepte stumpffalis Viette, 1960

Species of moth

Syllepte stumpffalis is a moth in the family Crambidae. It is found in Madagascar.
