= Syllepte aechmisalis =

Scientific classification
- Domain: Eukaryota
- Kingdom: Animalia
- Phylum: Arthropoda
- Class: Insecta
- Order: Lepidoptera
- Family: Crambidae
- Genus: Syllepte
- Species: S. aechmisalis

Binomial name
- Syllepte aechmisalis (Walker, 1859)

Synonyms
- Botys aechmisalis Walker, 1859; Conchylodes sabatalis Druce, 1895

Species of moth

Syllepte aechmisalis is a moth in the family Crambidae, described by Francis Walker in 1859. It is found in Mexico (Vera Cruz, Guerrero, Yucatán) and Guatemala.
