= Syllepte microdontalis =

Scientific classification
- Kingdom: Animalia
- Phylum: Arthropoda
- Class: Insecta
- Order: Lepidoptera
- Family: Crambidae
- Genus: Syllepte
- Species: S. microdontalis

Binomial name
- Syllepte microdontalis (Hampson, 1912)

Synonyms
- Sylepta microdontalis Hampson, 1912

Species of moth

Syllepte microdontalis is a moth in the family Crambidae. It was described by George Hampson in 1912. It is found in French Guiana.

The wingspan is 28–30 mm. Adults are pale grey-brown, the forewings with a faint pale point in the cell and a spot below it before the very indistinct antemedial line. There is a small pale spot in the end of the cell before the slight dark discoidal lunule with a pale centre. The postmedial line is indistinct, dark, slightly bent outwards between veins 5 and 3 and with two small dentate white marks before it, then retracted to below the end of the cell and erect to the inner margin. The costa is pale before and just beyond it. The hindwings have an indistinct dark discoidal spot followed by a faint pale bar before the postmedial line, which is very indistinct and diffused, forming a spot beyond the lower angle of the cell, then retracted to the lower angle and oblique to the inner margin beyond the middle.
