= Syllepte amissalis =

Scientific classification
- Kingdom: Animalia
- Phylum: Arthropoda
- Class: Insecta
- Order: Lepidoptera
- Family: Crambidae
- Genus: Syllepte
- Species: S. amissalis

Binomial name
- Syllepte amissalis (Guenée, 1854)

Synonyms
- Botys amissalis Guenée, 1854

Species of moth

Syllepte amissalis is a moth in the family Crambidae. It was described by Achille Guenée in 1854. It is found in Brazil.
