= Syllepte albitorquata =

Scientific classification
- Domain: Eukaryota
- Kingdom: Animalia
- Phylum: Arthropoda
- Class: Insecta
- Order: Lepidoptera
- Family: Crambidae
- Genus: Syllepte
- Species: S. albitorquata

Binomial name
- Syllepte albitorquata Tams, 1924

Species of moth

Syllepte albitorquata is a moth in the family Crambidae. It was described by Willie Horace Thomas Tams in 1924. It is found in Thailand.
