= Syllepte leucodontia =

Scientific classification
- Kingdom: Animalia
- Phylum: Arthropoda
- Class: Insecta
- Order: Lepidoptera
- Family: Crambidae
- Genus: Syllepte
- Species: S. leucodontia

Binomial name
- Syllepte leucodontia (Hampson, 1898)

Synonyms
- Sylepta leucodontia Hampson, 1898; Anthaeretis limata T. P. Lucas, 1898

Species of moth

Syllepte leucodontia is a moth in the family Crambidae. It is found in Indonesia (Sulawesi, Ambon Island), Papua New Guinea and Australia, where it has been recorded from Queensland.

Adults are fuscous with a slight purplish gloss, the forewings have an indistinct dark antemedial line bent outwards to the inner margin. There are large dark orbicular and reniform spots in the cell, situated on a pale streak. The postmedial line is curved from the costa to vein 2 and defined by whitish. The hindwings have a dark discoidal spot on a pale ground. The postmedial line is white.
