= Syllepte ochrotichroa =

Scientific classification
- Kingdom: Animalia
- Phylum: Arthropoda
- Class: Insecta
- Order: Lepidoptera
- Family: Crambidae
- Genus: Syllepte
- Species: S. ochrotichroa

Binomial name
- Syllepte ochrotichroa (Hampson, 1918)

Synonyms
- Sylepta ochrotichroa Hampson, 1918

Species of moth

Syllepte ochrotichroa is a moth in the family Crambidae.

== Distribution ==
It is found in India (Assam).
