= Syllepte cometa =

Scientific classification
- Domain: Eukaryota
- Kingdom: Animalia
- Phylum: Arthropoda
- Class: Insecta
- Order: Lepidoptera
- Family: Crambidae
- Genus: Syllepte
- Species: S. cometa

Binomial name
- Syllepte cometa (Warren, 1896)

Synonyms
- Haliotigris cometa Warren, 1896

Species of moth

Syllepte cometa is a moth in the family Crambidae. It was described by William Warren in 1896. It is found in Assam, India.

The wingspan is about 50 millimetres (2.0 in). The forewings are white and iridescent, with a velvety black basal line prolonged along the inner margin and a black inner line at one sixth, oblique and straight to below the median vein, then angled. The outer line is thick, velvety black, at three fourths, attenuated below the middle, running in shortly to beneath the discal spot, then oblique and angled towards the base, to the inner margin at two thirds. There are two large discal spots, not reaching the costa and filled with dull fulvous, the outer one is edged with darker. The central area below the median is filled with fulvous and grey scales and there is a blackish spot above the inner margin beyond the first line, edged with pale tawny and followed by two blackish streaks. The fulvous suffusion of the median area extends beyond the outer line as far as its elbow. The veins beyond the outer line are finely black. The apical two thirds of the marginal space is steel-blue, iridescent and white close to the outer line and yellowish along the costa. The hindwings are white with an irregular velvety-black fascia close to the base and a curved dark grey shade from the discal spot to the middle of the hind margin with the veins within it blackish. There is an oblique grey shade towards the apex, also with the veins in it blackish. The anal angle has the veins slightly tinged with grey.
