= Syllepte subaenescens =

Scientific classification
- Domain: Eukaryota
- Kingdom: Animalia
- Phylum: Arthropoda
- Class: Insecta
- Order: Lepidoptera
- Family: Crambidae
- Genus: Syllepte
- Species: S. subaenescens

Binomial name
- Syllepte subaenescens (Warren, 1896)

Synonyms
- Coptobasis subaenescens Warren, 1896

Species of moth

Syllepte subaenescens is a moth in the family Crambidae. It is found in Australia, where it has been recorded from Queensland.
