= Syllepte lygropialis =

Scientific classification
- Domain: Eukaryota
- Kingdom: Animalia
- Phylum: Arthropoda
- Class: Insecta
- Order: Lepidoptera
- Family: Crambidae
- Genus: Syllepte
- Species: S. lygropialis

Binomial name
- Syllepte lygropialis (West, 1931)

Synonyms
- Sylepta lygropialis West, 1931

Species of moth

Syllepte lygropialis is a moth in the family Crambidae. It was described by West in 1931. It is found in the Philippines (Luzon).

The wingspan is about 50 mm.
