= Syllepte nebulalis =

Scientific classification
- Domain: Eukaryota
- Kingdom: Animalia
- Phylum: Arthropoda
- Class: Insecta
- Order: Lepidoptera
- Family: Crambidae
- Genus: Syllepte
- Species: S. nebulalis

Binomial name
- Syllepte nebulalis (Schaus, 1920)

Synonyms
- Sylepta nebulalis Schaus, 1920

Species of moth

Syllepte nebulalis is a moth in the family Crambidae. It was described by William Schaus in 1920. It is found in Peru.

The wingspan is about 27 mm. The wings are thinly scaled whitish, irrorated with brown forming lines and blotches. The forewings have a dark spot at the base. The subbasal space is mottled and there are two antemedial pale lines defined by fine dark edging. There is also a dark medial point in the cell, a large dark spot on the discocellular and a whitish postmedial line defined by a dark line on the inner edge, and outwardly brown shaded to termen. The terminal space is more darkly shaded along the veins. The hindwings have irrorations forming numerous fine lines. The postmedial line is dark, thick and better defined. The terminal space is as on the forewings.
