= Syllepte zarialis =

Scientific classification
- Domain: Eukaryota
- Kingdom: Animalia
- Phylum: Arthropoda
- Class: Insecta
- Order: Lepidoptera
- Family: Crambidae
- Genus: Syllepte
- Species: S. zarialis

Binomial name
- Syllepte zarialis (C. Swinhoe, 1917)

Synonyms
- Sylepta zarialis C. Swinhoe, 1917

Species of moth

Syllepte zarialis is a moth in the family Crambidae first described by Charles Swinhoe in 1917. It is found in Papua New Guinea.

Adults are cream coloured, almost pure white, the forewings with the costa pale chocolate and an outer marginal fine line, as well as a little apical suffusion of the same colour. The hindwings have the outer marginal line very faintly touched with the same tint of colour.
