= Syllepte acridentalis =

Scientific classification
- Kingdom: Animalia
- Phylum: Arthropoda
- Class: Insecta
- Order: Lepidoptera
- Family: Crambidae
- Genus: Syllepte
- Species: S. acridentalis

Binomial name
- Syllepte acridentalis Hampson, 1912

Species of moth

Syllepte acridentalis is a moth in the family Crambidae. It was described by George Hampson in 1912. It is found on New Guinea.

The wingspan is about 32 mm (1.3 in). Adults are yellow, the forewings with a curved, somewhat waved and diffused antemedial line from the subcostal nervure to the inner margin. There is a dark point in the middle of the cell and a discoidal lunule. The postmedial line is strongly and rather irregularly dentate, oblique, bent outwards between veins 5 and 2 and with a diffused dentate band across its sinus. The hindwings have an oblique diffused somewhat dentate band from the costa beyond the middle to the tornus, towards which it narrows and with a dentate line beyond it between veins 5 and 2. The apical part of the costal area is suffused with brown.
