= Syllepte benedictalis =

Scientific classification
- Domain: Eukaryota
- Kingdom: Animalia
- Phylum: Arthropoda
- Class: Insecta
- Order: Lepidoptera
- Family: Crambidae
- Genus: Syllepte
- Species: S. benedictalis

Binomial name
- Syllepte benedictalis Holland, 1900

Species of moth

Syllepte benedictalis is a moth in the family Crambidae. It was described by William Jacob Holland in 1900. It is found in Buru, Indonesia.
