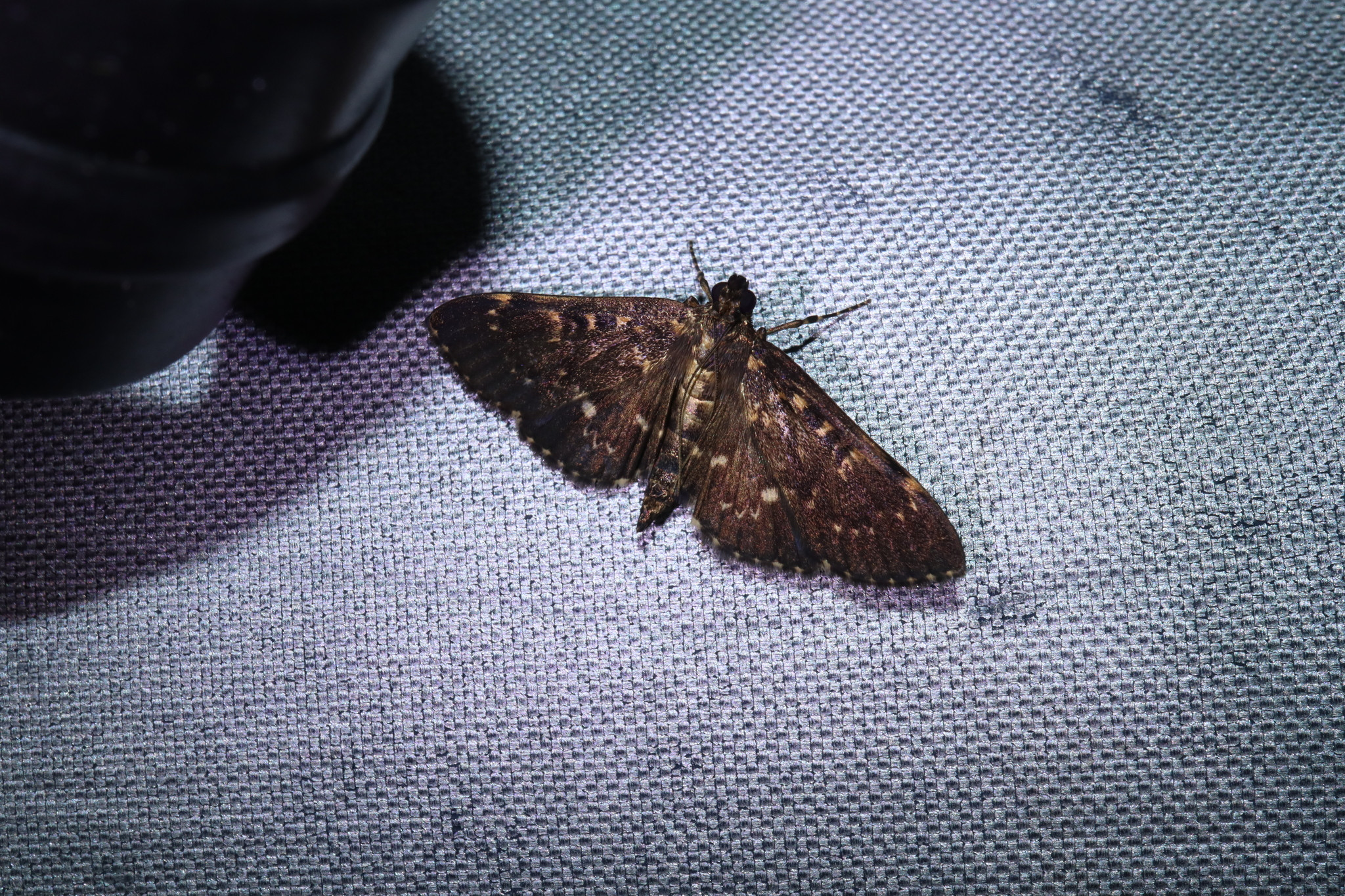
- Syllepte placophaea, Australia

Scientific classification
- Domain: Eukaryota
- Kingdom: Animalia
- Phylum: Arthropoda
- Class: Insecta
- Order: Lepidoptera
- Family: Crambidae
- Genus: Syllepte
- Species: S. placophaea

Binomial name
- Syllepte placophaea (Turner, 1915)

Synonyms
- Sylepta placophaea Turner, 1915

= Syllepte placophaea =

Species of moth

Syllepte placophaea is a moth in the family Crambidae. It is found in Australia, where it has been recorded from Queensland.
