= Syllepte nigriflava =

Scientific classification
- Domain: Eukaryota
- Kingdom: Animalia
- Phylum: Arthropoda
- Class: Insecta
- Order: Lepidoptera
- Family: Crambidae
- Genus: Syllepte
- Species: S. nigriflava

Binomial name
- Syllepte nigriflava (C. Swinhoe, 1894)

Synonyms
- Sylepta nigriflava C. Swinhoe, 1894

Species of moth

Syllepte nigriflava is a moth in the family Crambidae. It was described by Charles Swinhoe in 1894. It is found in the Indian states of Meghalaya and Sikkim.

== Description ==
The wingspan is about 30 millimetres (1.2 in). Adults are orange, the forewings without a spot in the cell. The discocellular spot of both wings, the antemedial line of the forewings and the postmedial lines of both wings are black and the outer area and margin are unmarked.
