= Syllepte lactiguttalis =

Scientific classification
- Domain: Eukaryota
- Kingdom: Animalia
- Phylum: Arthropoda
- Class: Insecta
- Order: Lepidoptera
- Family: Crambidae
- Genus: Syllepte
- Species: S. lactiguttalis

Binomial name
- Syllepte lactiguttalis (Warren, 1896)

Synonyms
- Sylepta lactiguttalis Warren, 1896

Species of moth

Syllepte lactiguttalis is a moth in the family Crambidae. It was described by William Warren in 1896. It is found in Meghalaya, India.

The wingspan is about 28 mm. There are pure white markings on the forewings. The subcostal postmedial patch is small and the postmedial line is represented by a slight series of specks bent outwards between veins 5 and 2, then retracted to below the angle of the cell. The hindwings have a postmedial band reduced to a fine line, minutely dentate and bent outwards between veins 5 and 2, then retracted to near the angle of the cell, sometimes obsolescent. Both wings have a marginal series of pale specks.
