= Syllepte semilugens =

Scientific classification
- Domain: Eukaryota
- Kingdom: Animalia
- Phylum: Arthropoda
- Class: Insecta
- Order: Lepidoptera
- Family: Crambidae
- Genus: Syllepte
- Species: S. semilugens

Binomial name
- Syllepte semilugens (Hampson, 1912)

Synonyms
- Sylepta semilugens Hampson, 1912; Neurina africalis Gaede, 1917

Species of moth

Syllepte semilugens is a moth in the family Crambidae that is known from Cameroon, Sierra Leone and Equatorial Guinea.

The wingspan is approx. 33–38 millimetres (1.3–1.5 in). The forewings have a fulvous yellow basal area with a subbasal black spot on the inner margin. There is a medial pale yellow band with a slight brownish point in middle of the cell. The terminal half is pale brownish with a faint dark discoidal bar and some yellowish on the costa beyond the middle. The hindwings have a pale yellow basal half, while the terminal half is pale brownish.
