= Syllepte pilocrocialis =

Scientific classification
- Domain: Eukaryota
- Kingdom: Animalia
- Phylum: Arthropoda
- Class: Insecta
- Order: Lepidoptera
- Family: Crambidae
- Genus: Syllepte
- Species: S. pilocrocialis

Binomial name
- Syllepte pilocrocialis (Strand, 1918)

Synonyms
- Subhedylepta pilocrocialis Strand, 1918

Species of moth

Syllepte pilocrocialis is a moth in the family Crambidae. It was described by Strand in 1918. It is found in Taiwan.
