= Syllepte occlusalis =

Scientific classification
- Domain: Eukaryota
- Kingdom: Animalia
- Phylum: Arthropoda
- Class: Insecta
- Order: Lepidoptera
- Family: Crambidae
- Genus: Syllepte
- Species: S. occlusalis

Binomial name
- Syllepte occlusalis (Dognin, 1905)

Synonyms
- Troctoceras occlusalis Dognin, 1905; Ulopeza syleptalis Schaus, 1912

Species of moth

Syllepte occlusalis is a moth in the family Crambidae. It was described by Paul Dognin in 1905. It is found in Ecuador's Loja Province and Costa Rica.
