= Syllepte rogationis =

Scientific classification
- Kingdom: Animalia
- Phylum: Arthropoda
- Class: Insecta
- Order: Lepidoptera
- Family: Crambidae
- Genus: Syllepte
- Species: S. rogationis

Binomial name
- Syllepte rogationis (Hampson, 1918)

Synonyms
- Sylepta rogationis Hampson, 1918

Species of moth

Syllepte rogationis is a moth in the family Crambidae. It was described by George Hampson in 1918. It is found in Mozambique.

The forewings are yellowish white, the costal area to the postmedial line, the inner margin (except towards the base), and the terminal area red-brown. There is a diffused incurved red-brown subbasal line and the antemedial line is red-brown, oblique to the median nervure. There is a red-brown spot in the middle of the cell and a discoidal bar. The median nervure towards the extremity and a patch beyond the lower angle of the cell are red-brown, as is the postmedial line. This line is excurved between veins 5 and 2, then retracted to the lower angle of the cell and excurved to the inner margin. The inner edge of the red-brown terminal area is waved, excurved between veins 5 and 2, then expanding into a patch confluent with the postmedial line. The hindwings are yellowish-white with an oblique brown discoidal bar. The veins beyond the lower angle of the cell are streaked with brown and the postmedial line is rather diffused red-brown, excurved between veins 5 and 2, then retracted to below the angle of the cell and ending above the inner margin. The terminal area is red-brown, and its inner edge waved and excurved between veins 5 and 2.
