= Syllepte desmialis =

Scientific classification
- Kingdom: Animalia
- Phylum: Arthropoda
- Class: Insecta
- Order: Lepidoptera
- Family: Crambidae
- Genus: Syllepte
- Species: S. desmialis

Binomial name
- Syllepte desmialis (Hampson, 1912)

Synonyms
- Sylepta desmialis Hampson, 1912

Species of moth

Syllepte desmialis is a moth in the family Crambidae. It was described by George Hampson in 1912. It is found in Nigeria.

The wingspan is about 24 mm. The forewings have a subbasal hyaline (glass-like) point in the cell and quadrate antemedial spots in the cell, the latter with a spot below it. There is a lunulate mark just beyond the cell composed of five almost conjoined spots between veins 3 and 8, the two middle ones larger. The hindwings have an oblique dark medial line ending above the tornus and a quadrate discoidal hyaline spot with a short dark line on its outer edge.
