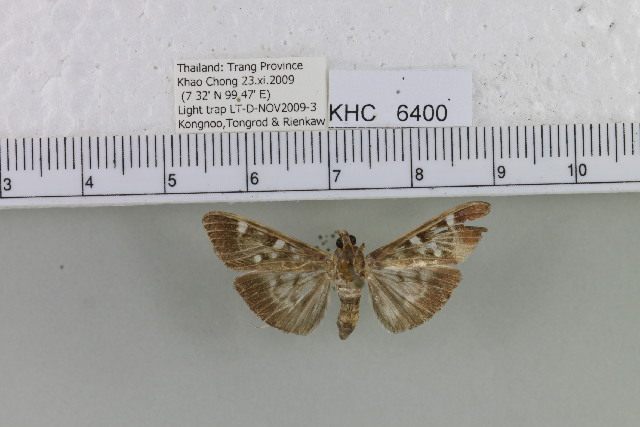

Scientific classification
- Domain: Eukaryota
- Kingdom: Animalia
- Phylum: Arthropoda
- Class: Insecta
- Order: Lepidoptera
- Family: Crambidae
- Genus: Syllepte
- Species: S. iophanes

Binomial name
- Syllepte iophanes (Meyrick, 1894)

Synonyms
- Notarcha iophanes Meyrick, 1894

= Syllepte iophanes =

Species of moth

Syllepte iophanes is a moth in the family Crambidae. It was described by Edward Meyrick in 1894. It is found on Borneo, Sulawesi, in China, Thailand and Cambodia.
