= Syllepte bipartalis =

Scientific classification
- Kingdom: Animalia
- Phylum: Arthropoda
- Class: Insecta
- Order: Lepidoptera
- Family: Crambidae
- Genus: Syllepte
- Species: S. bipartalis

Binomial name
- Syllepte bipartalis (Hampson, 1898)

Synonyms
- Sylepta bipartalis Hampson, 1898

Species of moth

Syllepte bipartalis is a moth in the family Crambidae. It was described by George Hampson in 1898. It is found in Pulo Laut, Indonesia.

The wingspan is about 38 mm. The basal area of the wings is orange yellow, the outer two-thirds fuscous grey with a golden gloss. There is a fuscous subbasal line in the medial portion of the forewings, as well as a speck in the cell and a discocellular lunule. The costa is ochreous.
