= Syllepte tetrathyralis =

Scientific classification
- Domain: Eukaryota
- Kingdom: Animalia
- Phylum: Arthropoda
- Class: Insecta
- Order: Lepidoptera
- Family: Crambidae
- Genus: Syllepte
- Species: S. tetrathyralis

Binomial name
- Syllepte tetrathyralis (Hampson, 1912)

Synonyms
- Sylepta tetrathyralis Hampson, 1912

Species of moth

Syllepte tetrathyralis is a moth in the family Crambidae. It was described by George Hampson in 1912. It is found in New Guinea.

The wingspan is about 26 millimetres (1.0 in). The forewings are orange-yellow, the medial area suffused with fulvous except the costal area and the inner margin. The costal edge is black and there is a hyaline spot from the middle of the cell to above vein 1, connected with a hyaline point beyond it in the cell. There is a yellow point at the upper angle of the cell and a hyaline spot beyond. There is also an indistinct diffused waved subterminal line. The hindwings are orange-yellow with some fulvous suffusion on the basal inner area. There is a small dark brown mark on the median nervure near the base followed by a hyaline patch from the middle of the cell to the submedian fold, then a fulvous-brown patch extending to beyond the cell with a hyaline spot on it beyond the lower angle. There is also an indistinct, rather diffused, waved fulvous subterminal line.
