= Syllepte dentilinea =

Scientific classification
- Domain: Eukaryota
- Kingdom: Animalia
- Phylum: Arthropoda
- Class: Insecta
- Order: Lepidoptera
- Family: Crambidae
- Genus: Syllepte
- Species: S. dentilinea

Binomial name
- Syllepte dentilinea (Gaede, 1916)

Synonyms
- Sylepta dentilinea Gaede, 1916

Species of moth

Syllepte dentilinea is a moth in the family Crambidae. It was described by Max Gaede in 1916. It is found in Cameroon.
