= Syllepte straminalis =

Scientific classification
- Kingdom: Animalia
- Phylum: Arthropoda
- Class: Insecta
- Order: Lepidoptera
- Family: Crambidae
- Genus: Syllepte
- Species: S. straminalis

Binomial name
- Syllepte straminalis (Guenée, 1854)

Synonyms
- Salbia straminalis Guenée, 1854

Species of moth

Syllepte straminalis is a moth in the family Crambidae. It was described by Achille Guenée in 1854. It is found in India.
