= Syllepte cyanea =

Scientific classification
- Kingdom: Animalia
- Phylum: Arthropoda
- Class: Insecta
- Order: Lepidoptera
- Family: Crambidae
- Genus: Syllepte
- Species: S. cyanea

Binomial name
- Syllepte cyanea (Walker, 1866)

Synonyms
- Erilusa cyanea Walker, 1866

Species of moth

Syllepte cyanea is a moth in the family Crambidae. It is found in Brazil (Amazonas, Ega).
