= Syllepte bitjecola =

Scientific classification
- Domain: Eukaryota
- Kingdom: Animalia
- Phylum: Arthropoda
- Class: Insecta
- Order: Lepidoptera
- Family: Crambidae
- Genus: Syllepte
- Species: S. bitjecola

Binomial name
- Syllepte bitjecola (Strand, 1920)

Synonyms
- Sylepta bitjecola Strand, 1920

Species of moth

Syllepte bitjecola is a moth in the family Crambidae. It was described by Strand in 1920. It is found in Cameroon.
