= Syllepte hyalescens =

Scientific classification
- Kingdom: Animalia
- Phylum: Arthropoda
- Class: Insecta
- Order: Lepidoptera
- Family: Crambidae
- Genus: Syllepte
- Species: S. hyalescens

Binomial name
- Syllepte hyalescens (Hampson, 1898)

Synonyms
- Sylepta hyalescens Hampson, 1898

Species of moth

Syllepte hyalescens is a moth in the family Crambidae. It was described by George Hampson in 1898. It is found in Nigeria.

The wingspan is about 28 mm. Adults are pale yellowish brown, the wings thinly scaled and with brown veins. The forewings have a fuscous subbasal mark on the inner margin and an antemedial oblique line. There is a discoidal lunule and the postmedial line is oblique from the costa to vein 2, where it is retracted to the angle of the cell, then oblique to the inner margin near the antemedial line. The termen is fuscous. The hindwings have a discoidal bar and the postmedial line is oblique from the costa to vein 2, where it is retracted to the angle of the cell, and reaching the inner margin near the tornus. The termen is fuscous and the cilia grey at the tips.
