= Syllepte holochralis =

Scientific classification
- Domain: Eukaryota
- Kingdom: Animalia
- Phylum: Arthropoda
- Class: Insecta
- Order: Lepidoptera
- Family: Crambidae
- Genus: Syllepte
- Species: S. holochralis

Binomial name
- Syllepte holochralis (Hampson, 1912)

Synonyms
- Sylepta holochralis Hampson, 1912

Species of moth

Syllepte holochralis is a moth in the family Crambidae. It was described by George Hampson in 1912. It is endemic to Kenya.

The wingspan is about 32 millimetres (1.3 in). Adults are uniform orange yellow.
