= Syllepte sarronalis =

Scientific classification
- Kingdom: Animalia
- Phylum: Arthropoda
- Class: Insecta
- Order: Lepidoptera
- Family: Crambidae
- Genus: Syllepte
- Species: S. sarronalis

Binomial name
- Syllepte sarronalis (Walker, 1859)

Synonyms
- Botys sarronalis Walker, 1859

Species of moth

Syllepte sarronalis is a moth in the family Crambidae. It was described by Francis Walker in 1859. It is found in Sierra Leone and the Gambia.
