= Syllepte argillosa =

Scientific classification
- Kingdom: Animalia
- Phylum: Arthropoda
- Class: Insecta
- Order: Lepidoptera
- Family: Crambidae
- Genus: Syllepte
- Species: S. argillosa

Binomial name
- Syllepte argillosa Guillermet in Viette & Guillermet, 1996

Species of moth

Syllepte argillosa is a moth in the family Crambidae. It was described by Christian Guillermet in 1996. It is found on Réunion in the Indian Ocean.
