= Syllepte melanomma =

Scientific classification
- Kingdom: Animalia
- Phylum: Arthropoda
- Class: Insecta
- Order: Lepidoptera
- Family: Crambidae
- Genus: Syllepte
- Species: S. melanomma

Binomial name
- Syllepte melanomma (Hampson, 1912)

Synonyms
- Sylepta melanomma Hampson, 1912

Species of moth

Syllepte melanomma is a moth in the family Crambidae. It was described by George Hampson in 1912. It is found in Nigeria.

== Description ==
The wingspan is 26–28 mm. The forewings are ochreous white, with somewhat oblique blackish subbasal and antemedial bands, the latter confluent with a spot on its outer side below the cell. There are somewhat quadrate blackish spots in the end of the cell and on the discocellulars, confluent on the median nervure, and a band from the lower angle of the cell to the inner margin.

The terminal area is broadly blackish with a cupreous gloss and an ochreous-white postmedial bar on it from the costa to vein 6. The hindwings are ochreous white with a faint diffused dark subbasal band and a blackish discoidal spot. There is a dark postmedial band, oblique to vein 3, then bent inwards to the lower angle of the cell and oblique to above the tornus.

The terminal area is blackish with a cupreous gloss, joined at vein 2 by a spur from the postmedial band and with an ochreous-white subterminal band on it from vein 4 to near the tornus.
