= Syllepte rosalina =

Scientific classification
- Domain: Eukaryota
- Kingdom: Animalia
- Phylum: Arthropoda
- Class: Insecta
- Order: Lepidoptera
- Family: Crambidae
- Genus: Syllepte
- Species: S. rosalina

Binomial name
- Syllepte rosalina (Strand, 1920)

Synonyms
- Erilusa rosalina Strand, 1920

Species of moth

Syllepte rosalina is a moth in the family Crambidae. It was described by Strand in 1920. It is found in Peru.
