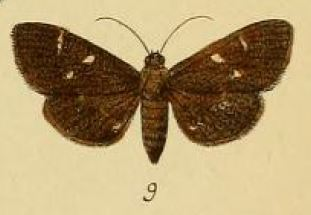

Scientific classification
- Domain: Eukaryota
- Kingdom: Animalia
- Phylum: Arthropoda
- Class: Insecta
- Order: Lepidoptera
- Family: Crambidae
- Genus: Syllepte
- Species: S. leonalis

Binomial name
- Syllepte leonalis (Schaus & Clements, 1893)

Synonyms
- Coptobasis leonalis Schaus & Clements, 1893

= Syllepte leonalis =

Species of moth

Syllepte leonalis is a moth in the family Crambidae that is found in Sierra Leone. The species was first described by William Schaus and W. G. Clements in 1893.
