= Syllepte banosalis =

Scientific classification
- Domain: Eukaryota
- Kingdom: Animalia
- Phylum: Arthropoda
- Class: Insecta
- Order: Lepidoptera
- Family: Crambidae
- Genus: Syllepte
- Species: S. banosalis

Binomial name
- Syllepte banosalis (Schaus, 1927)

Synonyms
- Sylepta banosalis Schaus, 1927

Species of moth

Syllepte banosalis is a moth in the family Crambidae. It was described by Schaus in 1927. It is found in the Philippines (Luzon, Mindanao).
