= Syllepte christophalis =

Scientific classification
- Kingdom: Animalia
- Phylum: Arthropoda
- Class: Insecta
- Order: Lepidoptera
- Family: Crambidae
- Genus: Syllepte
- Species: S. christophalis

Binomial name
- Syllepte christophalis Viette, 1988

Species of moth

Syllepte christophalis is a moth in the family Crambidae. It was described by Viette in 1988. It is found on La Réunion.
