= Syllepte semivialis =

Scientific classification
- Domain: Eukaryota
- Kingdom: Animalia
- Phylum: Arthropoda
- Class: Insecta
- Order: Lepidoptera
- Family: Crambidae
- Genus: Syllepte
- Species: S. semivialis

Binomial name
- Syllepte semivialis (Moore, 1888)

Synonyms
- Patania semivialis Moore, 1888; Nosophora semivialis

Species of moth

Syllepte semivialis is a moth in the family Crambidae. It was described by Frederic Moore in 1888. It is found in India (West Bengal, Darjeeling).
