= Syllepte striginervalis =

Scientific classification
- Kingdom: Animalia
- Phylum: Arthropoda
- Class: Insecta
- Order: Lepidoptera
- Family: Crambidae
- Genus: Syllepte
- Species: S. striginervalis

Binomial name
- Syllepte striginervalis (Guenée, 1854)

Synonyms
- Botys striginervalis Guenée, 1854

Species of moth

Syllepte striginervalis is a moth in the family Crambidae. It is found in Brazil.
