= Syllepte attenualis =

Scientific classification
- Domain: Eukaryota
- Kingdom: Animalia
- Phylum: Arthropoda
- Class: Insecta
- Order: Lepidoptera
- Family: Crambidae
- Genus: Syllepte
- Species: S. attenualis

Binomial name
- Syllepte attenualis (Hampson, 1912)

Synonyms
- Sylepta attenualis Hampson, 1912

Species of moth

Syllepte attenualis is a moth in the family Crambidae. It was described by George Hampson in 1912. It is endemic to Kenya.

The wingspan is about 40 millimetres (1.6 in) for males and 34 millimetres (1.3 in) for females. The forewings are pale ochreous, irrorated with brown, especially on the costal area to the postmedial line. There is a subbasal black spot on the inner margin and an oblique sinuous fuscous antemedial line, as well as a black point in the middle of the cell and a discoidal bar. The postmedial line is fuscous and there is a punctiform black terminal line. The hindwings are pale ochreous, irrorated with brown especially on the disc. There is a slight fuscous discoidal bar and a fuscous postmedial line. There is also a fine black terminal line.
