= Syllepte nasonalis =

Scientific classification
- Domain: Eukaryota
- Kingdom: Animalia
- Phylum: Arthropoda
- Class: Insecta
- Order: Lepidoptera
- Family: Crambidae
- Genus: Syllepte
- Species: S. nasonalis

Binomial name
- Syllepte nasonalis (Hampson, 1898)

Synonyms
- Sylepta nasonalis Hampson, 1898

Species of moth

Syllepte nasonalis is a moth in the family Crambidae. It was described by George Hampson in 1898. It is endemic to South Africa.

The wingspan is about 32 millimetres (1.3 in). The forewings are yellowish brown with a dark-edged hyaline (glass-like) spot in the cell, conjoined to one below. There is a quadrate spot in the end of the cell and a dark postmedial line running out to an angle on vein 5, then retracted to below the angle of the cell, with a series of hyaline spots on its outer edge. The outer area is fuscous brown. The hindwings are fuscous brown with a dark antemedial line, angled on vein 5 and with an irregular hyaline band beyond it. Both wings have a dark marginal line.
