= Syllepte consimilalis =

Scientific classification
- Domain: Eukaryota
- Kingdom: Animalia
- Phylum: Arthropoda
- Class: Insecta
- Order: Lepidoptera
- Family: Crambidae
- Genus: Syllepte
- Species: S. consimilalis

Binomial name
- Syllepte consimilalis (Lederer, 1863)

Synonyms
- Botys consimilalis Lederer, 1863

Species of moth

Syllepte consimilalis is a moth in the family Crambidae. It was described by Julius Lederer in 1863. It is found on Ambon Island and in Ternate in Indonesia.
