= Syllepte ogoalis =

Scientific classification
- Domain: Eukaryota
- Kingdom: Animalia
- Phylum: Arthropoda
- Class: Insecta
- Order: Lepidoptera
- Family: Crambidae
- Genus: Syllepte
- Species: S. ogoalis

Binomial name
- Syllepte ogoalis (Walker, 1859)

Synonyms
- Botys ogoalis Walker, 1859

Species of moth

Syllepte ogoalis is a moth in the family Crambidae. It was described by Francis Walker in 1859. It is found on Borneo and in Sri Lanka.
