= Syllepte maculilinealis =

Scientific classification
- Kingdom: Animalia
- Phylum: Arthropoda
- Class: Insecta
- Order: Lepidoptera
- Family: Crambidae
- Genus: Syllepte
- Species: S. maculilinealis

Binomial name
- Syllepte maculilinealis (Hampson, 1918)

Synonyms
- Sylepta maculilinealis Hampson, 1918

Species of moth

Syllepte maculilinealis is a moth in the family Crambidae. It was described by George Hampson in 1918. It is found in Uganda.

The wingspan is about 32 mm. The forewings are brown suffused with grey. The antemedial line is brown defined on each side by white arising at the subcostal nervure. There is a white spot in the end of the cell before the blackish discoidal bar. The postmedial line is dark defined on the outer side by a narrow white band to vein 5, then by small white spots incurved to vein 5, where it is slightly angled outwards, then very slightly waved, oblique to vein 3, then strongly incurved. The hindwings are brown suffused with grey and with a small blackish discoidal spot with a whitish spot before it. There is an irregularly sinuous dark postmedial line defined on the outer side by a narrow rather maculate white band from the costa beyond the middle to the inner margin before the middle touching the lower angle of the cell.
