= Syllepte sellalis =

Scientific classification
- Kingdom: Animalia
- Phylum: Arthropoda
- Class: Insecta
- Order: Lepidoptera
- Family: Crambidae
- Genus: Syllepte
- Species: S. sellalis

Binomial name
- Syllepte sellalis (Guenée, 1854)

Synonyms
- Botys sellalis Guenée, 1854; Botys disjunctalis Walker, 1869; Botys scinisalis Moore, 1877

Species of moth

Syllepte sellalis is a moth in the family Crambidae. It was described by Achille Guenée in 1854. It is found in Bangladesh and India.

It has a wingspan of 41-43mm.
