= Syllepte paucilinealis =

Scientific classification
- Kingdom: Animalia
- Phylum: Arthropoda
- Class: Insecta
- Order: Lepidoptera
- Family: Crambidae
- Genus: Syllepte
- Species: S. paucilinealis

Binomial name
- Syllepte paucilinealis (Snellen, 1880)

Synonyms
- Botys paucilinealis Snellen, 1880

Species of moth

Syllepte paucilinealis is a moth in the family Crambidae. It is found in Indonesia (Sulawesi).
