= Syllepte diacymalis =

Scientific classification
- Kingdom: Animalia
- Phylum: Arthropoda
- Class: Insecta
- Order: Lepidoptera
- Family: Crambidae
- Genus: Syllepte
- Species: S. diacymalis

Binomial name
- Syllepte diacymalis (Hampson, 1912)

Synonyms
- Sylepta diacymalis Hampson, 1912

Species of moth

Syllepte diacymalis is a moth in the family Crambidae. It was described by George Hampson in 1912. It is found in Mexico (Morelos), Guatemala and Costa Rica.

The wingspan is 40–48 mm. The forewings are white tinged with ochreous yellow and faintly irrorated with grey, the costa is pure white, except at the base which is fulvous. There is a faint oblique grey antemedial line and a slight white discoidal striga. The postmedial line is indistinct, grey, oblique from vein 8 to the discal fold, bent outwards from vein 5 to below 3, then retracted to below the angle of the cell and oblique and sinuous to the inner margin. The hindwings are white, faintly tinged with ochreous and irrorated with grey. There is a faint grey discoidal striga and the postmedial line is indistinct, grey, bent outwards between veins 5 and 2, then retracted to below the end of the cell and again excurved.
