= Syllepte mahafalalis =

Scientific classification
- Kingdom: Animalia
- Phylum: Arthropoda
- Class: Insecta
- Order: Lepidoptera
- Family: Crambidae
- Genus: Syllepte
- Species: S. mahafalalis

Binomial name
- Syllepte mahafalalis Marion & Viette, 1956

Species of moth

Syllepte mahafalalis is a moth in the family Crambidae. It was described by Hubert Marion and Pierre Viette in 1956. It is found on Madagascar.
