= List of moths of Pakistan =

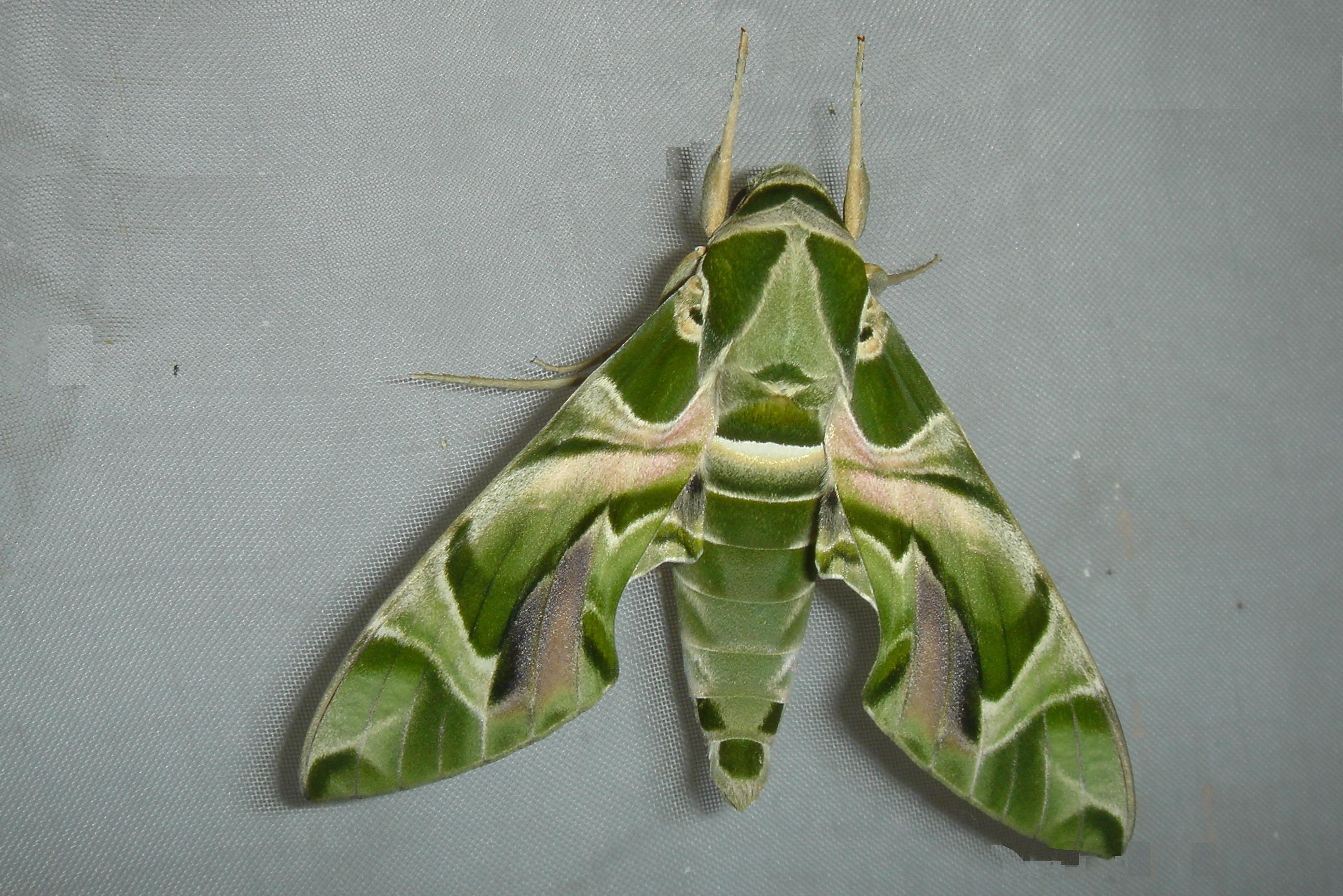
Daphnis nerii in Islamabad.

This is a list of moths recorded in Pakistan.

== Arctiidae ==
- Aegocera venulia
- Agape ficus
- Agylla albifinis
- Agylla metaxantha
- Vamuna remelana
- Amerila astreus
- Amsacta albistriga
- Amsacta lineola
- Amsacta moorei
- Garden tiger moth
- Arctia ricnini
- Argina argus
- Argina cribraria
- Asota caricae
- Asura calamaria
- Callimorpha plagiata
- Callimorpha principalis
- Amata syntomoides
- Carcinopyga lichenigera
- Cyana arama
- Cyana bellissima
- Cyana dobertyi
- Cyana peregrina
- Cyana puella
- Cyana quadrinotata
- Chrysorabdia viridata
- Creatonotos gangis
- Creatonotos transiens
- Spilosoma erythrozona
- Spilosoma bifurca
- Spilosoma obliqua
- Spilosoma impleta
- Spilosoma poswali
- Lemyra stigmata
- Nebrarctia transversa
- Spilarctia melanostigma
- Spilarctia casigneta
- Spilarctia subtestacea
- Andala species
- Digama hearseyana
- Dysauxes punctata
- Eilema basinota
- Katha conformis
- Dolgoma reticulata
- Eilema vagesa
- Estigmene lactinea
- Alphaea imbuta
- Estigmene quadriramosa
- Euchromia polymena
- Miltochrista phaeodonta
- Nyctemera lacticinia
- Nyctemera adversata
- Oeonistis entella
- Pericallia transversa
- Siccia sordida
- Aemene taprobanis
- Sidyma albifinis
- Simerreea basinota
- Stigmatophora palmata
- Amata bicincta
- Amata sperbius
- Thyrgorina rhodophila
- Utetheisa amhara
- Utetheisa lotrix
- Utetheisa pulchella

== Bombycidae ==
- Penicillifera apicalis
- Trilocha varians

== Cossidae ==
- Dervishiya cadambae
- Chalcidica minea
- Polyphagozerra coffeae
- Zeuzera multistrigata

== Thyatirinae ==
- Thyatira batis

== Drepanidae ==
- Macrocilix mysticata
- Oreta vatama

== Geometridae ==
- Agathia lycaenaria
- Aglossochloris radiate
- Alcis nudipennis
- Alcis trikotaria
- Aplocera plagiata
- Ascotis imparata
- Chlorisa pretiosaria
- Cleora repulsaria
- Colostygia albogirata
- Ctenognophos paerlita
- Dysphania minervaria
- Ectropis deodarae
- Euphyia unangulata
- Odontopera angularia
- Odontopera kametaria
- Hemistola detracta
- Hemistola fletcheri
- Heterolocha rosearia
- Medasina albidaria
- Medasina pulverulenta
- Ozola microniaria
- Physetobasis dentifascia
- Sabaria rondelari
- Scopula nesciaria
- Scopula pallida
- Semiothisa eleonora
- Semiothisa streniataria
- Somatina anthophilata
- Stenorumia ablunata

== Heliodinidae ==
- Eretmocera impactella

== Aganainae ==
- Asota ficus

== Lasiocampidae ==
- Estigena pardalis
- Macroplectra nararia
- Parasa lepida
- Parasa pastoralis
- Setora nitens
- Thosea cana

== Lymantriinae ==
- Olene mendosa
- Euproctis divisa
- Euproctis fraterna
- Somena scintillans
- Euproctis vitellina
- Euproctis xanthorrhoea
- Leucoma flavosulphre
- Lymantria concolor
- Lymantria obfuscate
- Numenes siletti
- Trabala vishnou

== Lyonetiidae ==
- Leucoptera sphenograpta

== Noctuidae ==
- Aegocera bimacula
- Agrotis flammatra
- Agrotis ipsilon
- Amyna axis
- Apatele maxima
- Apopestes spectrum
- Arcte taprobana
- Areyophora ieteriea
- Asticta dorsigera
- Borolia venalba
- Oraesia emarginata
- Characoma rufieirra
- Cirphis loreyi
- Daseochaeta pallens
- Emmelia fascialis
- Entomogramma fautrix
- Catocala flavescens
- Erebus ephesperis
- Eublemma silicula
- Euplexia gemmifera
- Episteme adulatrix
- Fodina stola
- Grammodes stolida
- Haderonia culta
- Helicoverpa armigera
- Hermonassa incise
- Hypena subvittalis
- Hypocala lativitta
- Hypotacha indecisa
- Ichthyura anachoreta
- Lugoptera honesta
- Leucania angulifera
- Nycteola diplographa
- Othreis salaminia
- Ozarba hypenoides
- Pericyma umbrina
- Plecoptera reflexa
- Plusia nigristigma
- Spodoptera littoralis
- Rhesala imparata
- Simplicia butesalis
- Simyra conspersa
- Speiredonia obscura
- Spodoptera exigua
- Tarache fascialis
- Tegosioma pentodontalis
- Timora beatrix
- Xanthograpta trilatalis

== Pyralidae ==
- Aulacodes peribocalis
- Aulacodes sejunctali
- Betousa trifascialis
- Catereirna cedrella
- Cotachena histricalis
- Dioryctria abietella
- Euchromius ocellea
- Euzophera cedrella
- Glyphodes caesalis
- Hapalia demastisalis
- Spoladea recurvalis
- Hymenoptychis sordida
- Hypsipyla robusta
- Loxostge palealis
- Notarcha aurolinealis
- Margarania pyloalis
- Nomophila noctuella
- Aporodes floralis
- Palpita claralis
- Papua aurifusella
- Pionea verbascalis
- Plodia interpunctella
- Pygospila tyres
- Pyralis tripartite
- Botyodes diniasalis
- Pramadea crotonalis
- Synclera univocalis
- Uresiphita polygonalis

== Saturniidae ==
- Actias selene
- Antheraea paphia
- Antheraea roylei
- Saturnia codyi
- Caligula lindia

== Sphingidae ==
- Acherontia lachesis
- Hyles lineata
- Cephonodes hylas
- Chromis erotus
- Clanis phalaris
- Daphnis nerii
- Agrius convolvuli
- Hippotion celerio
- Macroglossum nycteris
- Nephele didyma
- Deilephila elpenor
- Polyptychus dentatus
- Sataspes scotti
- Theretra nessus

== Tortricidae ==
- Archips micaceana
- Clepsis rurinana
- Fulcrifera tricentra
- Olethreutes cellifer
