= V. maculata =

V. maculata may refer to:

- Vamuna maculata, an Asian moth
- Vanmanenia maculata, an Asian loach
- Venus maculata, a saltwater clam
- Vespa maculata, a North American wasp
