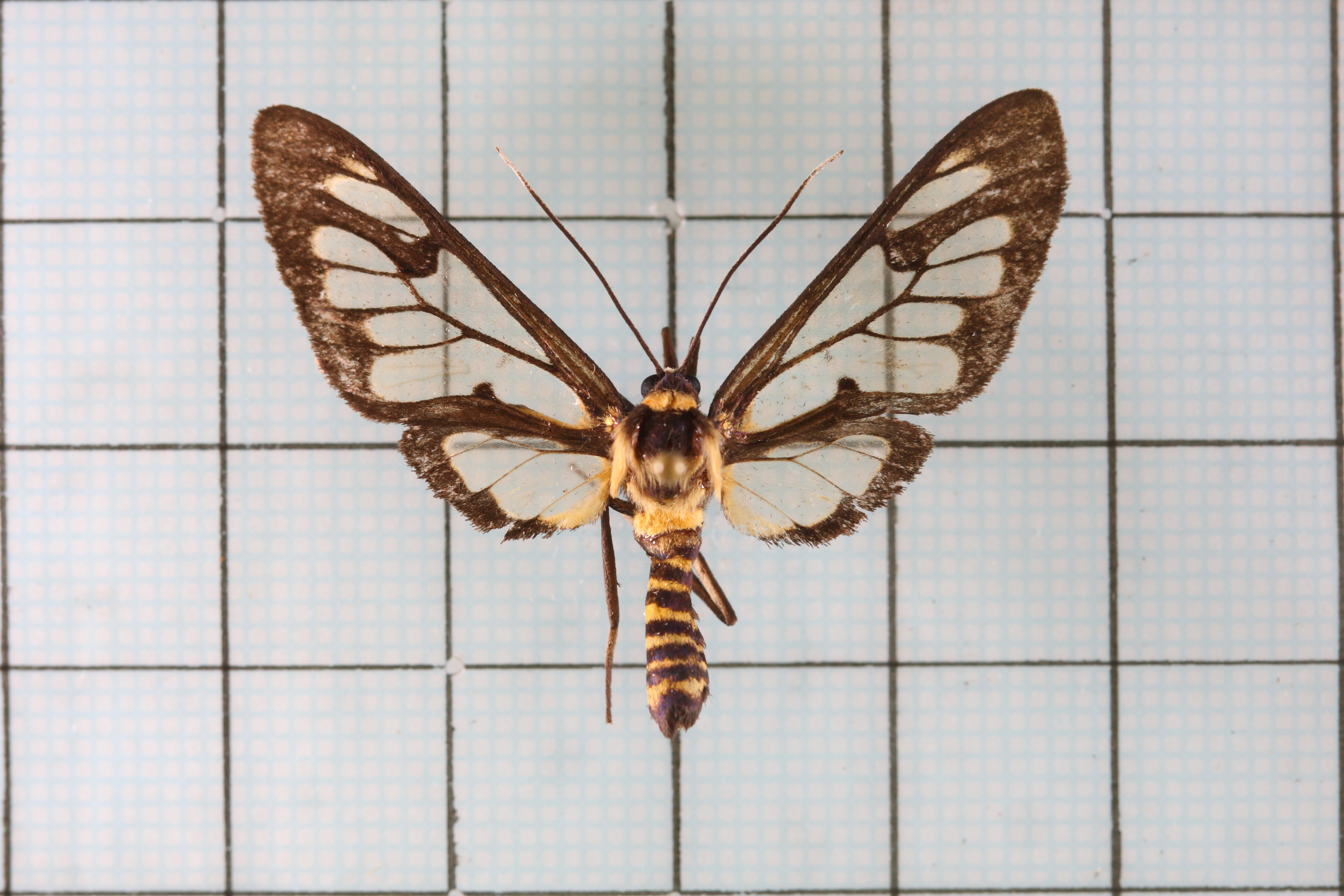

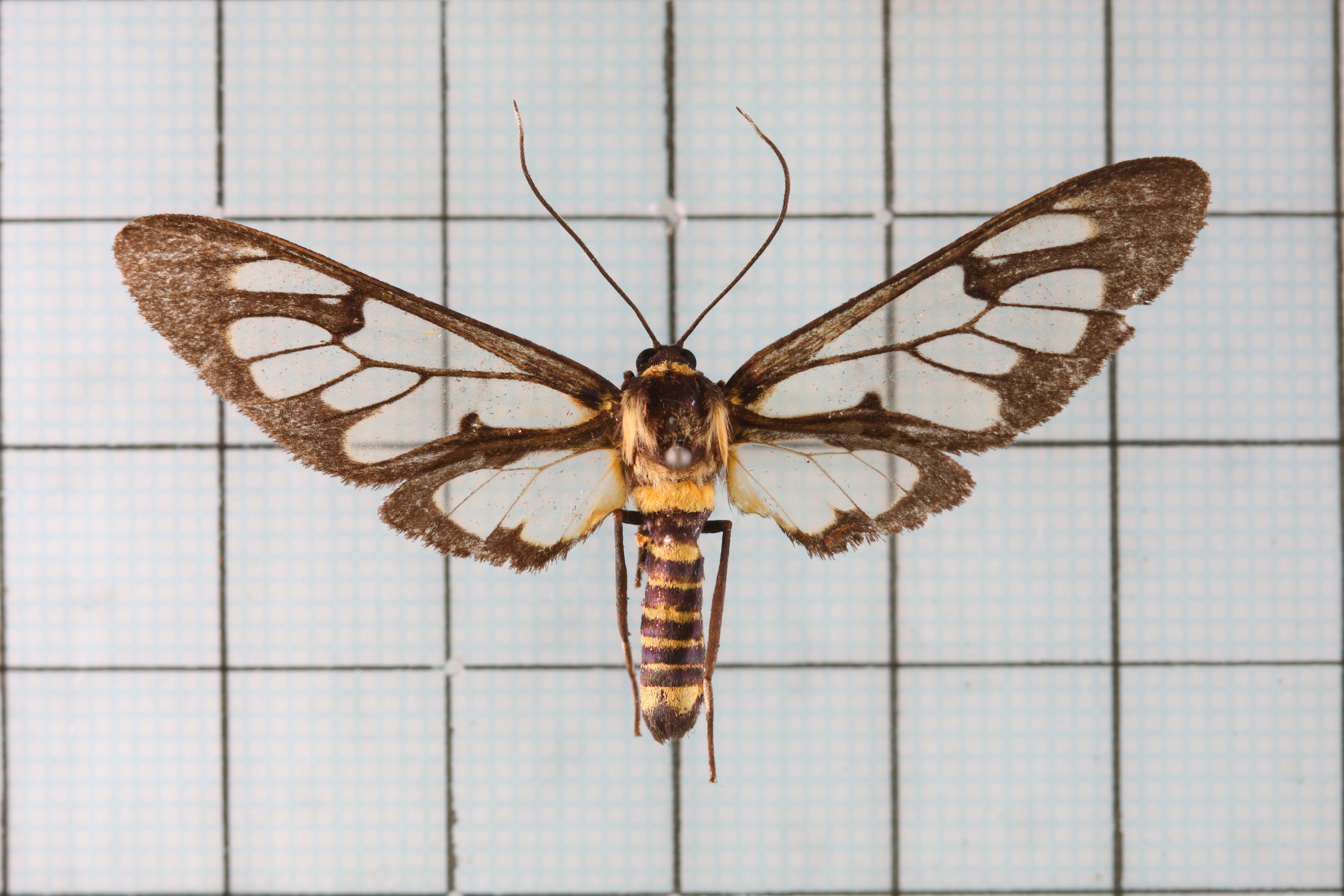

Scientific classification
- Domain: Eukaryota
- Kingdom: Animalia
- Phylum: Arthropoda
- Class: Insecta
- Order: Lepidoptera
- Superfamily: Noctuoidea
- Family: Erebidae
- Subfamily: Arctiinae
- Genus: Caeneressa
- Species: C. diaphana

Binomial name
- Caeneressa diaphana (Kollar, 1844)

Synonyms
- Syntomis diaphana Kollar, 1844; Syntomis melas Walker, 1854; Syntomis vitreata Herrich-Schäffer, [1855]; Syntomis andersoni Moore, 1871; Syntomis oenone Butler, 1876; Syntomis melaena Hampson, 1898

= Caeneressa diaphana =

Species of moth

Caeneressa diaphana is a moth in the family Erebidae first described by Vincenz Kollar in 1844. It is found from India to southern China, Taiwan and Sundaland.

The wingspan is 38–45 mm.
