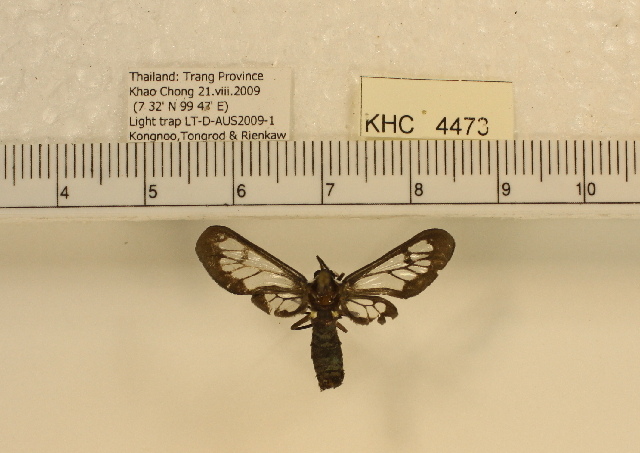

Scientific classification
- Kingdom: Animalia
- Phylum: Arthropoda
- Clade: Pancrustacea
- Class: Insecta
- Order: Lepidoptera
- Superfamily: Noctuoidea
- Family: Erebidae
- Subfamily: Arctiinae
- Genus: Caeneressa
- Species: C. marcescoides

Binomial name
- Caeneressa marcescoides Holloway, 1988

= Caeneressa marcescoides =

Species of moth

Caeneressa marcescoides is a moth in the family Erebidae. It is found in Borneo, Papua New Guinea and Thailand.

The wingspan is 19–21 mm.
