= Pramadea ovialis =

Scientific classification
- Domain: Eukaryota
- Kingdom: Animalia
- Phylum: Arthropoda
- Class: Insecta
- Order: Lepidoptera
- Family: Crambidae
- Genus: Pramadea
- Species: P. ovialis

Binomial name
- Pramadea ovialis (Walker, 1859)

Synonyms
- Antigastra cinnamomalis Saalmüller, 1880; Syllepte ovialis; Botys aburalis Plötz, 1880; Syllepte ovialis serei Guillermet, 2008

Species of moth

Pramadea ovialis is a moth in the family Crambidae that is found in subtropical eastern and southern Africa, including islands of the Indian Ocean. The species has also been recorded from West Africa.

It has a wingspan of approximately 7–28 millimetres (0.28–1.10 in).
