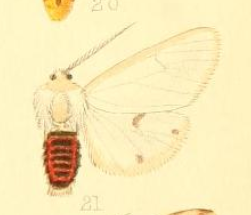

Scientific classification
- Domain: Eukaryota
- Kingdom: Animalia
- Phylum: Arthropoda
- Class: Insecta
- Order: Lepidoptera
- Superfamily: Noctuoidea
- Family: Erebidae
- Subfamily: Arctiinae
- Genus: Spilosoma
- Species: S. erythrozona

Binomial name
- Spilosoma erythrozona (Kollar, [1844])

Synonyms
- Euprepia erythrozona Kollar, [1844]; Diacrisia erythrozona; Spilosoma cognata Walker, 1869

= Spilosoma erythrozona =

Species of moth

Spilosoma erythrozona is a moth in the family Erebidae. It was described by Vincenz Kollar in 1844. It is found in China (south-western Xinjiang, Tibet), eastern Afghanistan and Himalayas.

== Description ==
Head and thorax white; abdomen crimson above with black bands; white below, with two series of black spots. Wings white, some specimens with traces of a spot at end of cell and sub-marginal spots to both wings. Hab. JM. VV. Himalayas; Kashmir. Wingspan of the male 40 mm, female 46 mm.
