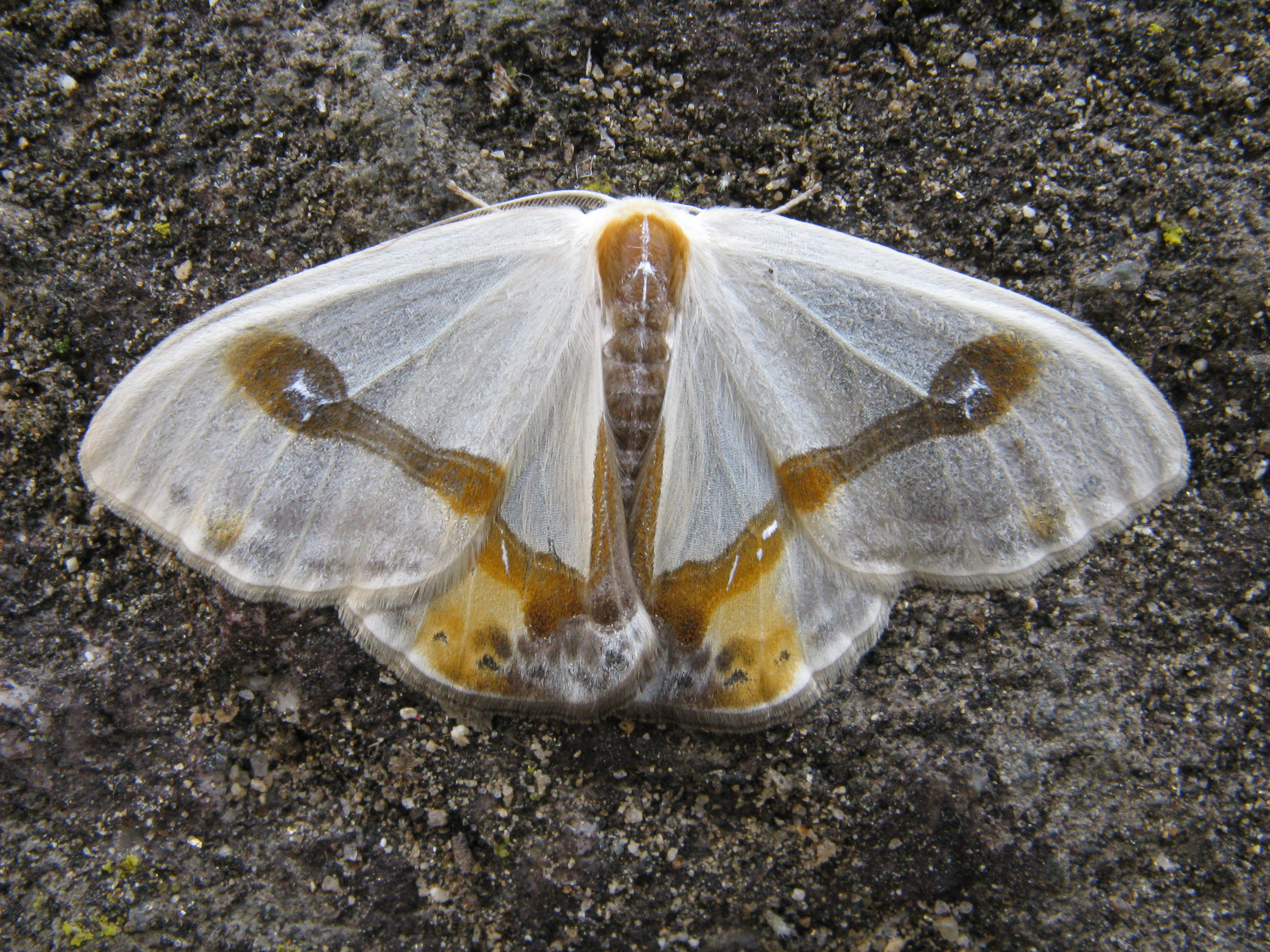
- Macrocilix mysticata watsoni

Scientific classification
- Domain: Eukaryota
- Kingdom: Animalia
- Phylum: Arthropoda
- Class: Insecta
- Order: Lepidoptera
- Family: Drepanidae
- Subfamily: Drepaninae
- Tribe: Drepanini
- Genus: Macrocilix; Butler, 1886

= Macrocilix =

Moth genus in family Drepanidae

Macrocilix is a genus of moths belonging to the subfamily Drepaninae.

== Species ==
- Macrocilix maia (Leech, 1888)
- Macrocilix mysticata (Walker, [1863])
- Macrocilix nongloba H.F. Chu & L.Y. Wang, 1988
- Macrocilix ophrysa H.F. Chu & L.Y. Wang, 1988
- Macrocilix trinotata H.F. Chu & L.Y. Wang, 1988
