= Chrysorabdia alpina =

Scientific classification
- Kingdom: Animalia
- Phylum: Arthropoda
- Class: Insecta
- Order: Lepidoptera
- Superfamily: Noctuoidea
- Family: Erebidae
- Subfamily: Arctiinae
- Genus: Chrysorabdia
- Species: C. alpina

Binomial name
- Chrysorabdia alpina Hampson, 1900

Synonyms
- Chrysorabdia viridata Draudt, 1914

Species of moth

Chrysorabdia alpina is a moth of the subfamily Arctiinae. It is found in Tibet.
