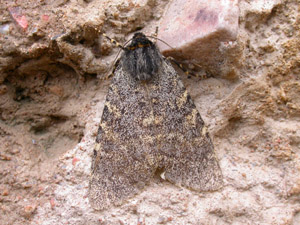
- Carcinopyga proserpina

Scientific classification
- Domain: Eukaryota
- Kingdom: Animalia
- Phylum: Arthropoda
- Class: Insecta
- Order: Lepidoptera
- Superfamily: Noctuoidea
- Family: Erebidae
- Subfamily: Arctiinae
- Subtribe: Callimorphina
- Genus: Carcinopyga; Felder, 1874

Synonyms
- Euarctia Staudinger, 1887

= Carcinopyga =

Genus of moths

Carcinopyga is a genus of tiger moths in the family Erebidae. The genus was described by Felder in 1874.

== Species ==
- Carcinopyga gurkoi Kautt & Saldaitis, 1997
- Carcinopyga lichenigera C. Felder & R. Felder, 1874
- Carcinopyga proserpina (Staudinger, 1887)
