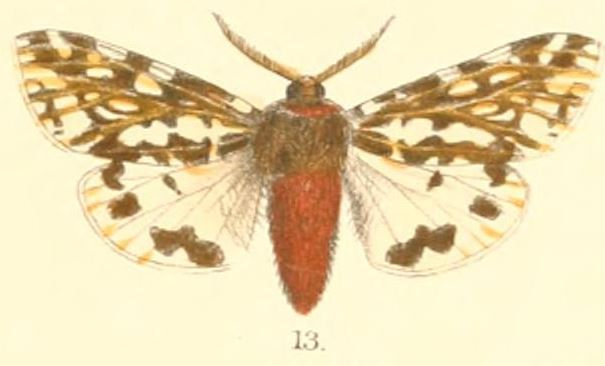
- Alphaea florescens

Scientific classification
- Domain: Eukaryota
- Kingdom: Animalia
- Phylum: Arthropoda
- Class: Insecta
- Order: Lepidoptera
- Superfamily: Noctuoidea
- Family: Erebidae
- Subfamily: Arctiinae
- Subtribe: Spilosomina
- Genus: Alphaea; Walker, 1855

Type species
- Alphaea fulvohirta Walker, 1855

Synonyms
- Nyaca Moore, 1879; Nayaca Moore, 1879

= Alphaea (moth) =

Genus of moths

Alphaea is a genus of tiger moths in the family Erebidae. The genus was erected by Francis Walker in 1855. They are found on India, Sri Lanka, Myanmar and Java only.

== Description ==
Palpi short and hairy, which extending beyond the frons. Hind tibia with two pairs of spurs. Forewings are rather long and narrow.

== Species ==
=== Subgenus Alphaea sensu stricto ===
- Alphaea anopunctata (Oberthür, 1896)
- Alphaea dellabrunai Saldaitis & Ivinskis, 2008
- Alphaea fulvohirta Walker, 1855
- Alphaea hongfena Fang, 1983

=== Subgenus Flavalphaea Dubatolov & Kishida, 2005 ===
- Alphaea impleta (Walker, [1865])
- Alphaea khasiana (Rothschild, 1910)

=== Subgenus Nayaca Moore, 1879 ===
- Alphaea chiyo Dubatolov & Kishida, 2005
- Alphaea florescens (Moore, 1879)
- Alphaea imbuta (Walker, 1855)
- Alphaea rothschildi Dubatolov & Kishida, 2005
- Alphaea turatii (Oberthür, 1911)
