= Alphaea chiyo =

Scientific classification
- Kingdom: Animalia
- Phylum: Arthropoda
- Clade: Pancrustacea
- Class: Insecta
- Order: Lepidoptera
- Superfamily: Noctuoidea
- Family: Erebidae
- Subfamily: Arctiinae
- Genus: Alphaea
- Species: A. chiyo

Binomial name
- Alphaea chiyo Dubatolov & Kishida, 2005

Synonyms
- Nayaca chiyo

Species of moth

Alphaea chiyo is a moth of the family Erebidae. It was described by Vladimir Viktorovitch Dubatolov and Yasunori Kishida in 2005. It is found in Yunnan, China.
