= Caeneressa brithyris =

Scientific classification
- Domain: Eukaryota
- Kingdom: Animalia
- Phylum: Arthropoda
- Class: Insecta
- Order: Lepidoptera
- Superfamily: Noctuoidea
- Family: Erebidae
- Subfamily: Arctiinae
- Genus: Caeneressa
- Species: C. brithyris

Binomial name
- Caeneressa brithyris (H. Druce, 1898)

Synonyms
- Syntomis brithyris H. Druce, 1898

Species of moth

Caeneressa brithyris is a moth of the family Erebidae. It was described by Herbert Druce in 1898. It is found on Borneo and Sumatra.
