= Caeneressa leucozona =

Scientific classification
- Kingdom: Animalia
- Phylum: Arthropoda
- Class: Insecta
- Order: Lepidoptera
- Superfamily: Noctuoidea
- Family: Erebidae
- Subfamily: Arctiinae
- Genus: Caeneressa
- Species: C. leucozona

Binomial name
- Caeneressa leucozona (Hampson, 1911)

Synonyms
- Syntomis leucozona Hampson, 1911

Species of moth

Caeneressa leucozona is a moth of the family Erebidae. It was described by George Hampson in 1911. It is found on Borneo. The habitat consists of primary forests.
