= Caeneressa sexpuncta =

Scientific classification
- Domain: Eukaryota
- Kingdom: Animalia
- Phylum: Arthropoda
- Class: Insecta
- Order: Lepidoptera
- Superfamily: Noctuoidea
- Family: Erebidae
- Subfamily: Arctiinae
- Genus: Caeneressa
- Species: C. sexpuncta

Binomial name
- Caeneressa sexpuncta (Rothschild, 1912)

Synonyms
- Eressa sexpuncta Rothschild, 1912

Species of moth

Caeneressa sexpuncta is a moth of the family Erebidae. It was described by Rothschild in 1912. It is found on Borneo. The habitat consists of lowland forests.
