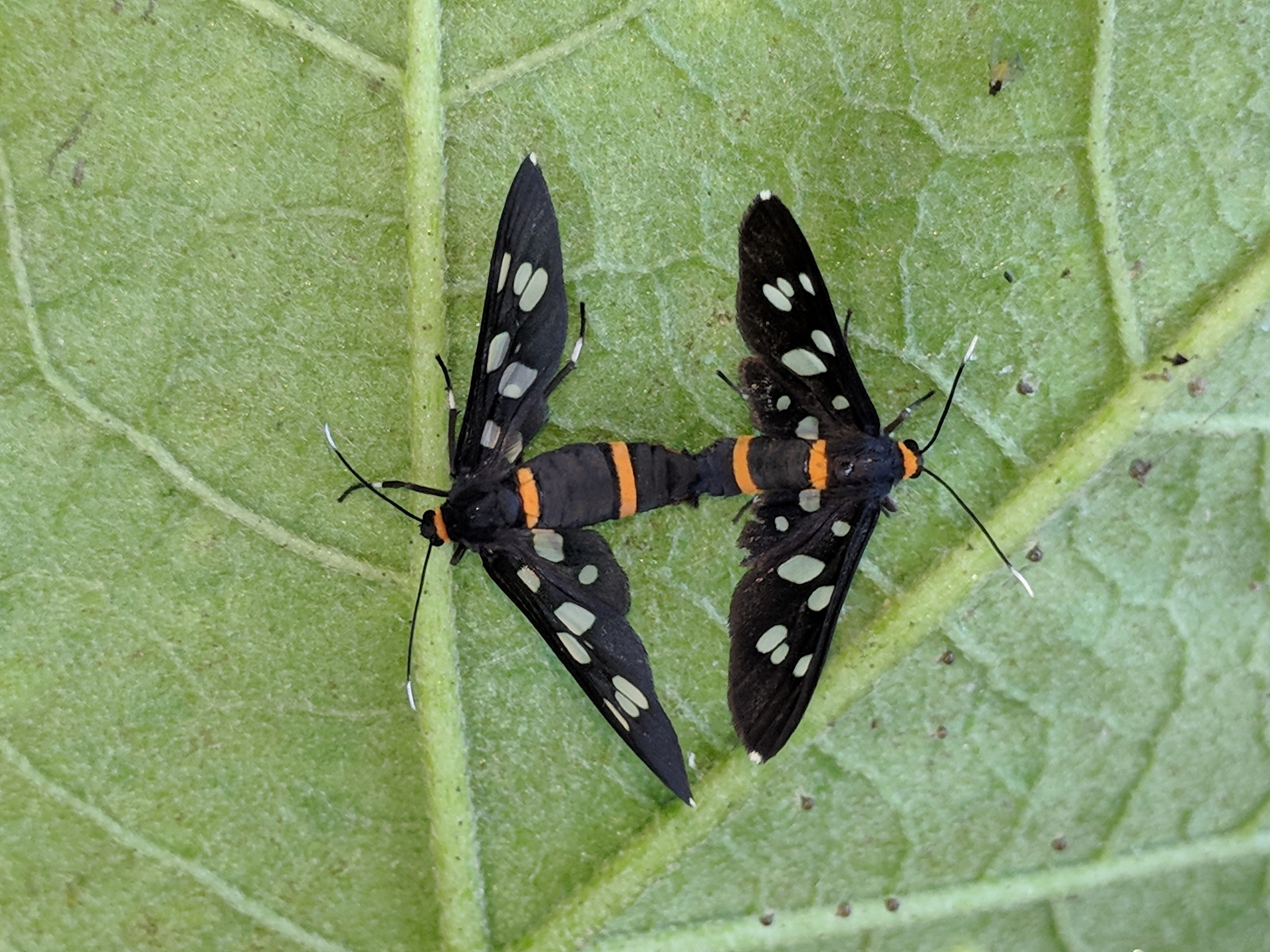

Scientific classification
- Kingdom: Animalia
- Phylum: Arthropoda
- Clade: Pancrustacea
- Class: Insecta
- Order: Lepidoptera
- Superfamily: Noctuoidea
- Family: Erebidae
- Subfamily: Arctiinae
- Genus: Amata
- Species: A. bicincta

Binomial name
- Amata bicincta (Kollar, 1844)

Synonyms
- Syntomis bicincta Kollar [1844]

= Amata bicincta =

Species of moth

Amata bicincta is a moth in the genus Amata (or Syntomis) of the subfamily Arctiinae ("woolly bears" or "tiger moths"). The species was first described by Vincenz Kollar in 1844. It is also known as the nine-spotted moth and handmaiden moth. It is a common day-flying warningly colored moth. The adult is unpalatable to birds and other predators. It is found in the north-western Himalayas, Sikkim, Khasi, Pakistan and Bangladesh.

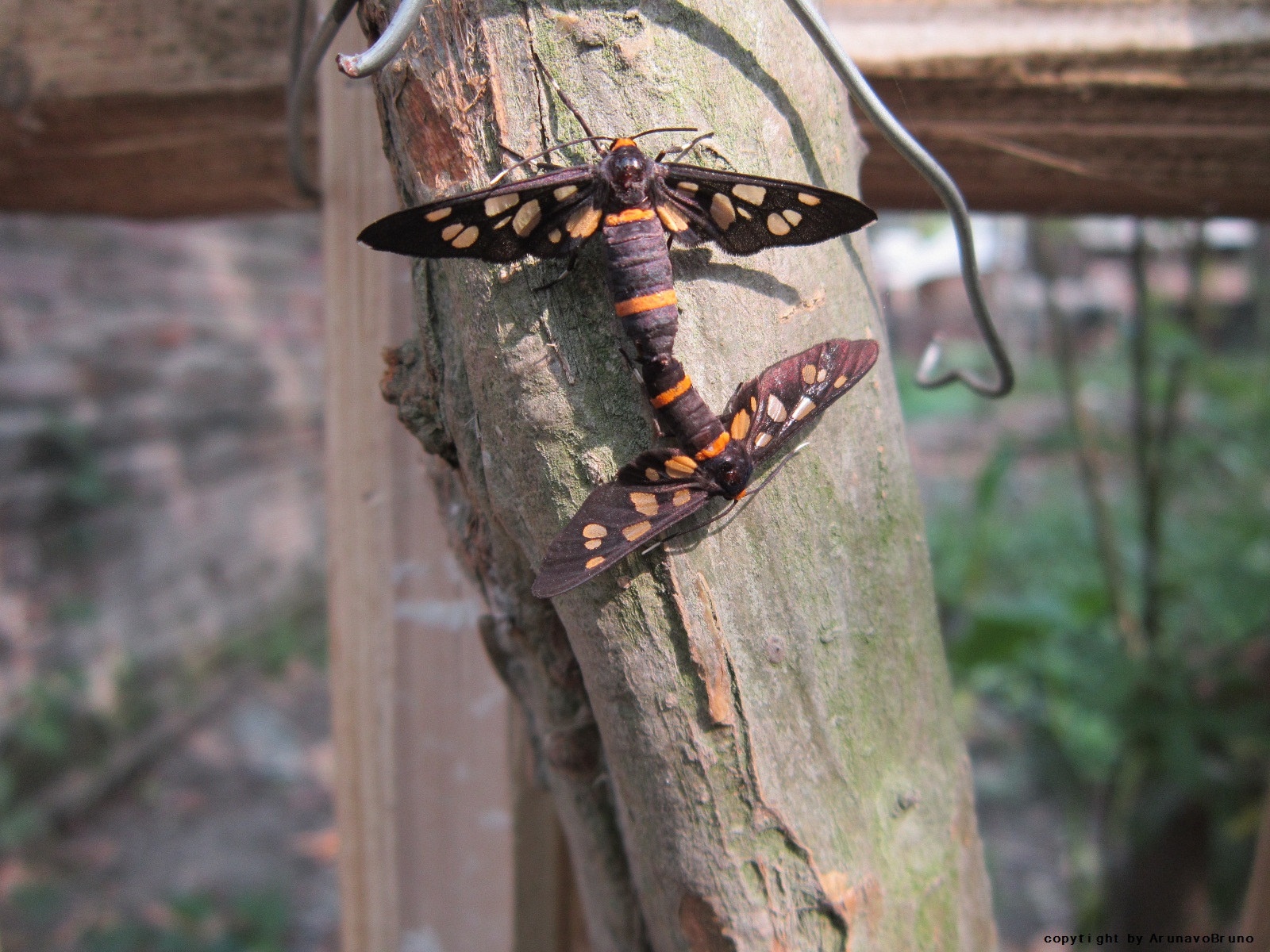
Mating
