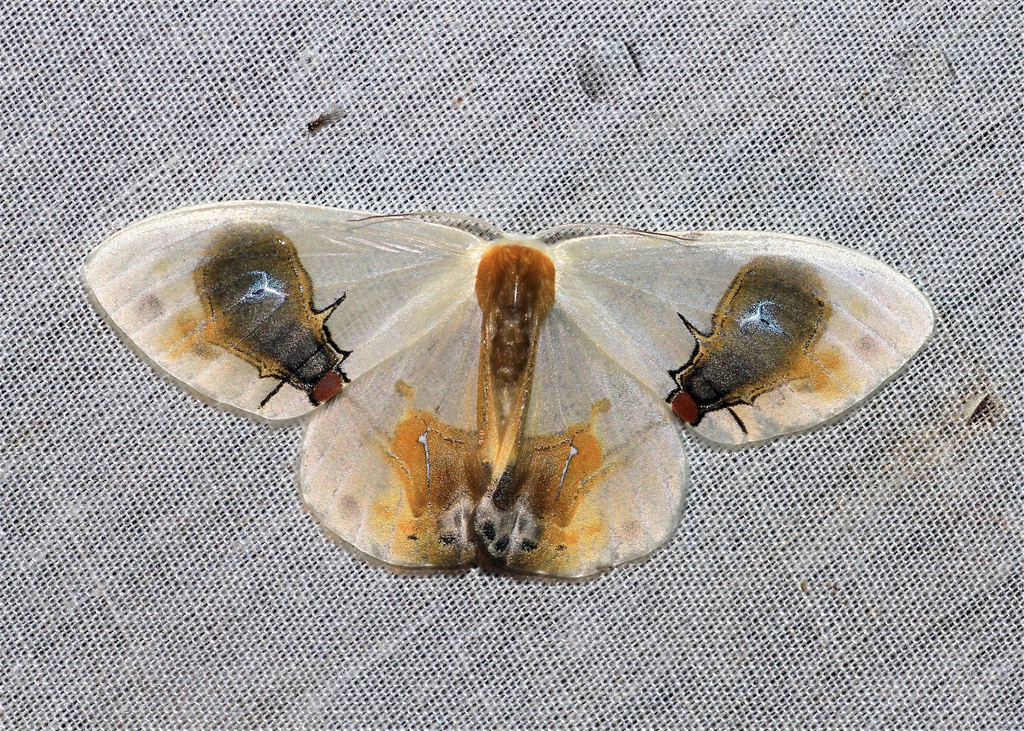
- In Borneo

Scientific classification
- Kingdom: Animalia
- Phylum: Arthropoda
- Class: Insecta
- Order: Lepidoptera
- Family: Drepanidae
- Genus: Macrocilix
- Species: M. maia

Binomial name
- Macrocilix maia (Leech, 1888)

Synonyms
- Argyris maia Leech, 1888

= Macrocilix maia =

Species of hook-tip moth

Macrocilix maia is a moth in the family Drepanidae first described by John Henry Leech in 1888. It is found in India, Japan, Taiwan, Korea, China, Peninsular Malaysia, Sumatra and Borneo.

Adults have been recorded in May.

The larvae feed on the leaves of Quercus variabilis.

The moth features two symmetrical patterns resembling flies feeding on bird droppings. The moth has a pungent odor.
