= Xanthograpta glycychroa =

Scientific classification
- Kingdom: Animalia
- Phylum: Arthropoda
- Clade: Pancrustacea
- Class: Insecta
- Order: Lepidoptera
- Superfamily: Noctuoidea
- Family: Noctuidae
- Genus: Xanthograpta
- Species: X. glycychroa

Binomial name
- Xanthograpta glycychroa (Turner, 1904)

Synonyms
- Axiorata glycychroa Turner, 1904; Micrapatetis glycychroa Hampson, 1910

Species of moth

Xanthograpta glycychroa is a moth of the family Noctuidae first described by Turner in 1904. It is endemic to Thursday Island, which is located approximately 39 kilometres (24 miles) north of the Cape York Peninsula in Far North Queensland, Australia.
