= Pramadea denticulata =

Scientific classification
- Domain: Eukaryota
- Kingdom: Animalia
- Phylum: Arthropoda
- Class: Insecta
- Order: Lepidoptera
- Family: Crambidae
- Genus: Pramadea
- Species: P. denticulata

Binomial name
- Pramadea denticulata Moore, 1888

Synonyms
- Syllepte denticulata; Coptobasis denticulata

Species of moth

Pramadea denticulata is a moth in the family Crambidae. It was described by Frederic Moore in 1888. It is found in north-eastern India.
