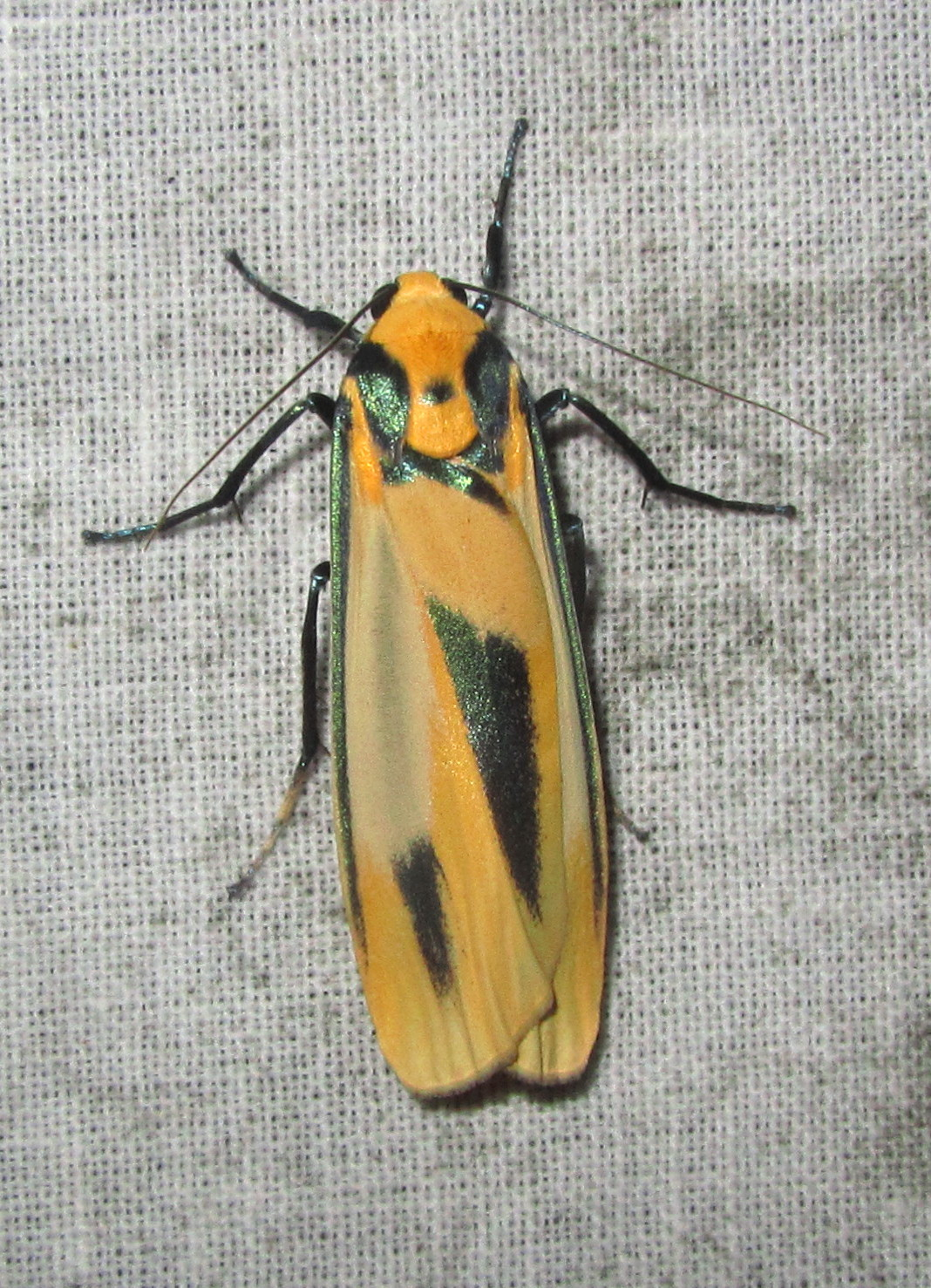
- Chrysorabdia bivitta

Scientific classification
- Domain: Eukaryota
- Kingdom: Animalia
- Phylum: Arthropoda
- Class: Insecta
- Order: Lepidoptera
- Superfamily: Noctuoidea
- Family: Erebidae
- Subfamily: Arctiinae
- Tribe: Lithosiini
- Subtribe: Lithosiina
- Genus: Chrysorabdia; Butler, 1877

= Chrysorabdia =

Genus of moths

Chrysorabdia is a genus of moths in the subfamily Arctiinae. The genus was erected by Arthur Gardiner Butler in 1877.

== Species ==
- Chrysorabdia alpina
- Chrysorabdia aurantiaca
- Chrysorabdia bivitta
- Chrysorabdia vilemani
- Chrysorabdia viridata
