= Pramadea lunalis =

Scientific classification
- Domain: Eukaryota
- Kingdom: Animalia
- Phylum: Arthropoda
- Class: Insecta
- Order: Lepidoptera
- Family: Crambidae
- Genus: Pramadea
- Species: P. lunalis

Binomial name
- Pramadea lunalis (Guenée, 1854)

Synonyms
- Botys lunalis Guenée, 1854; Coptobasis lunalis; Botys contigualis Walker, 1866; Botys thyasalis Walker, 1859

Species of moth

Pramadea lunalis is a moth in the family Crambidae. It was described by Achille Guenée in 1854. It is found in Taiwan, India, Sri Lanka, Myanmar, Borneo, Sulawesi, Sumbawa and Java. It is also found in Australia, where it has been recorded from the Northern Territory and Queensland.
