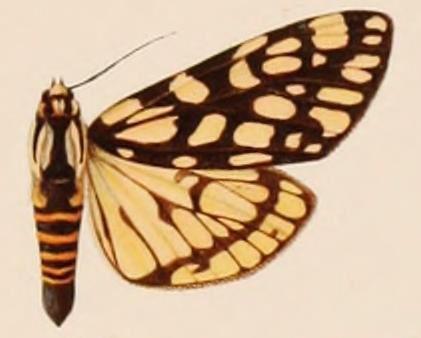

Scientific classification
- Domain: Eukaryota
- Kingdom: Animalia
- Phylum: Arthropoda
- Class: Insecta
- Order: Lepidoptera
- Superfamily: Noctuoidea
- Family: Erebidae
- Subfamily: Arctiinae
- Genus: Alphaea
- Species: A. khasiana

Binomial name
- Alphaea khasiana (Rothschild, 1910)

Synonyms
- Diacrisia khasiana Rothschild, 1910; Alphaea (Flavalphaea) khasiana

= Alphaea khasiana =

Species of moth

Alphaea khasiana is a moth of the family Erebidae first described by Walter Rothschild in 1910. It is found in China (Yunnan) and India (Assam).
