= Alphaea turatii =

Scientific classification
- Domain: Eukaryota
- Kingdom: Animalia
- Phylum: Arthropoda
- Class: Insecta
- Order: Lepidoptera
- Superfamily: Noctuoidea
- Family: Erebidae
- Subfamily: Arctiinae
- Genus: Alphaea
- Species: A. turatii

Binomial name
- Alphaea turatii (Oberthür, 1911)

Synonyms
- Estigmene turatii Oberthür, 1911; Nayaca turatii

Species of moth

Alphaea turatii is a moth of the family Erebidae. It was described by Charles Oberthür in 1911. It is found in Sichuan, China.
