= Cladarctia =

Scientific classification
- Domain: Eukaryota
- Kingdom: Animalia
- Phylum: Arthropoda
- Class: Insecta
- Order: Lepidoptera
- Superfamily: Noctuoidea
- Family: Erebidae
- Subfamily: Arctiinae
- Genus: Cladarctia; Kôda, 1988
- Species: C. quadriramosa

Binomial name
- Cladarctia quadriramosa (Kollar, [1844])

Synonyms
- Euprepia quadriramosa Kollar, [1844]; Estigmene quadriramosa

Genus of moths

Cladarctia is a monotypic tiger moth genus in the family Erebidae erected by Nobutoyo Kôda in 1988. Its only species, Cladarctia quadriramosa, was first described by Vincenz Kollar in 1844. It is found in Tibet, Nepal, Kashmir and the north-western Himalayas.
