= Caeneressa annosa =

Scientific classification
- Kingdom: Animalia
- Phylum: Arthropoda
- Class: Insecta
- Order: Lepidoptera
- Superfamily: Noctuoidea
- Family: Erebidae
- Subfamily: Arctiinae
- Genus: Caeneressa
- Species: C. annosa

Binomial name
- Caeneressa annosa (Walker, 1859)

Synonyms
- Syntomis annosa Walker, 1859; Syntomis marcescens Felder, 1874; Syntomis lasara Pagenstecher, 1885

Species of moth

Caeneressa annosa is a moth of the family Erebidae. It was described by Francis Walker in 1859. It is found on Borneo, the Natuna Islands, Sumatra and Peninsular Malaysia.
