= Alphaea dellabrunai =

Scientific classification
- Kingdom: Animalia
- Phylum: Arthropoda
- Clade: Pancrustacea
- Class: Insecta
- Order: Lepidoptera
- Superfamily: Noctuoidea
- Family: Erebidae
- Subfamily: Arctiinae
- Genus: Alphaea
- Species: A. dellabrunai

Binomial name
- Alphaea dellabrunai Saldaitis & Ivinskis, 2008

Species of moth

Alphaea dellabrunai is a moth of the family Erebidae. It was described by Saldaitis and Ivinskis in 2008. It is found in Yunnan, China.
