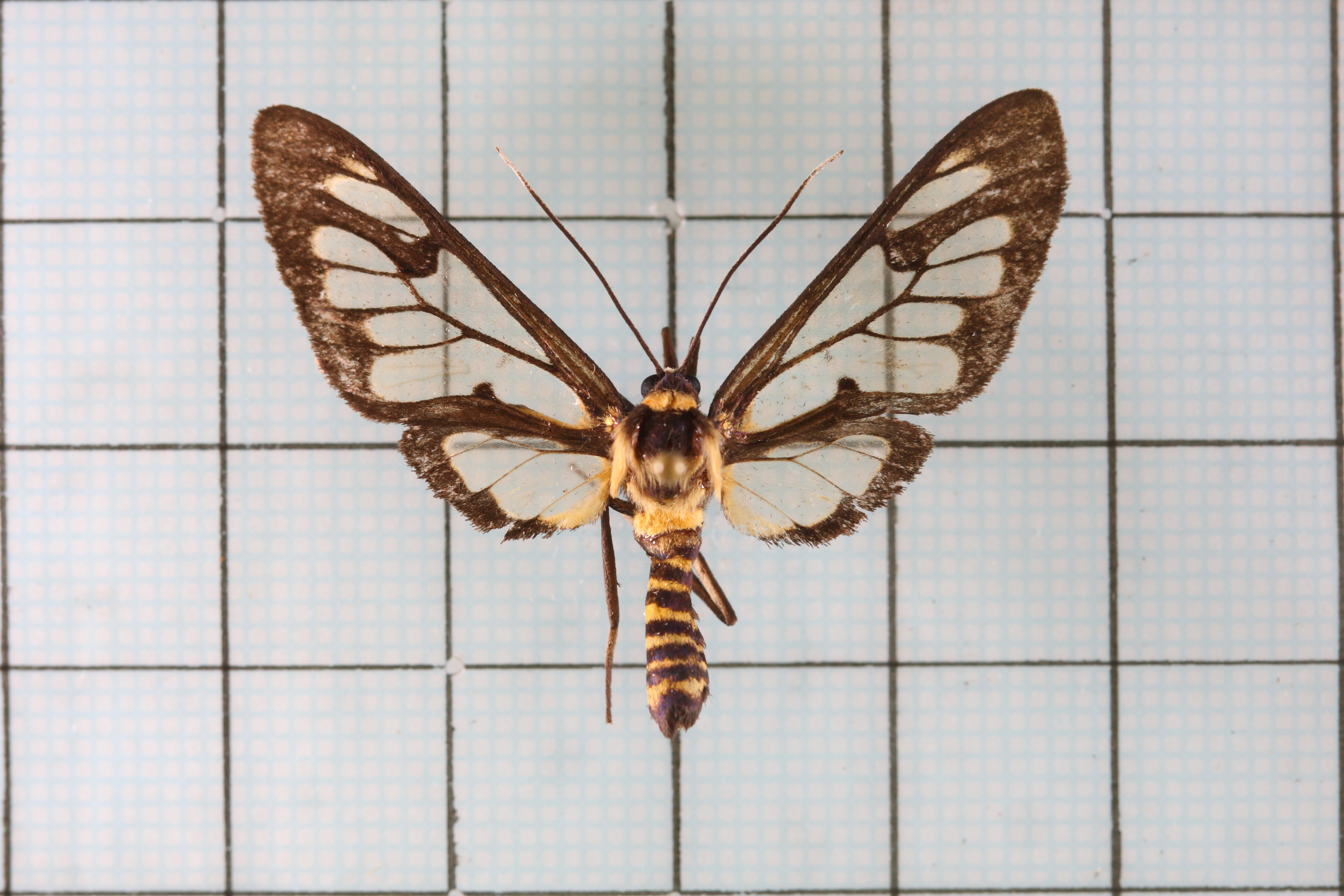
- Caeneressa diaphana

Scientific classification
- Domain: Eukaryota
- Kingdom: Animalia
- Phylum: Arthropoda
- Class: Insecta
- Order: Lepidoptera
- Superfamily: Noctuoidea
- Family: Erebidae
- Subfamily: Arctiinae
- Tribe: Syntomini
- Genus: Caeneressa; Obraztsov, 1957

= Caeneressa =

Genus of moths

Caeneressa is a genus of moths in the family Erebidae.

== Species ==
- Caeneressa albifrons (Moore, 1878)
- Caeneressa alikangiensis (Strand, 1915)
- Caeneressa annosa (Walker, 1859)
- Caeneressa brithyris (Druce, 1898)
- Caeneressa diaphana (Kollar, 1848)
- Caeneressa dispar Obraztsov, 1957
- Caeneressa everetti (Rothschild, 1910)
- Caeneressa fouqueti (de Joannis, 1912)
- Caeneressa graduata (Hampson, 1898)
- Caeneressa hoenei Obraztsov, 1957
- Caeneressa klapperichi Obraztsov, 1957
- Caeneressa leucozona (Hampson, 1911)
- Caeneressa longipennis (Walker, 1862)
- Caeneressa lutosa (Holloway, 1976)
- Caeneressa marcescoides Holloway, 1988
- Caeneressa newara (Moore, 1879)
- Caeneressa ningyuena Obraztsov, 1957
- Caeneressa obsoleta (Leech, 1898)
- Caeneressa oenone (Butler, 1876)
- Caeneressa robusta (Holloway, 1976)
- Caeneressa pratti (Leech, 1889)
- Caeneressa proxima Obraztsov, 1957
- Caeneressa rubrozonata (Poujade, 1886)
- Caeneressa serrata (Hampson, [1893])
- Caeneressa sexpuncta (Rothschild, 1912)
- Caeneressa syntomoides (Rothschild, 1912)
- Caeneressa swinhoei (Leech, 1898)
- Caeneressa tienmushana Obraztsov, 1957
- Caeneressa zernyi Obraztsov, 1957
