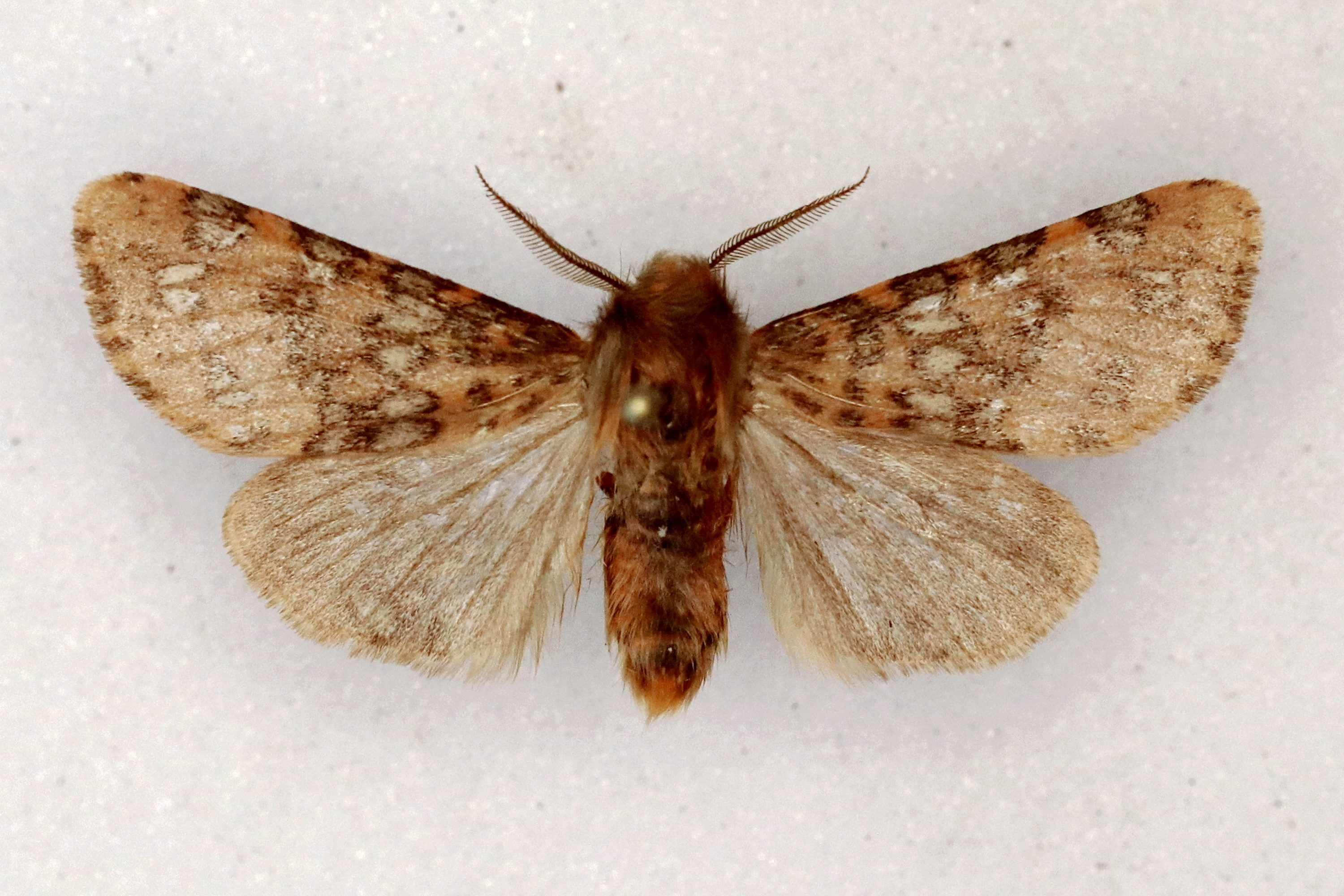
- Nebrarctia semiramis

Scientific classification
- Domain: Eukaryota
- Kingdom: Animalia
- Phylum: Arthropoda
- Class: Insecta
- Order: Lepidoptera
- Superfamily: Noctuoidea
- Family: Erebidae
- Subfamily: Arctiinae
- Subtribe: Spilosomina
- Genus: Nebrarctia; Watson, 1980

Type species
- Arctia semiramis Staudinger, 1891 [1892]

Synonyms
- Spilarctia Staudinger, 1891 [1892] (preocc. Butler, 1875)

= Nebrarctia =

Genus of moths

Nebrarctia is a genus of moths in the family Erebidae from the Near East, Central Asia and Himalayas. The genus was erected by Otto Staudinger in 1891.

== Species ==
- Nebrarctia guttata (Erschoff, 1874)
- Nebrarctia hunza (de Freina, 1997)
- Nebrarctia semiramis (Staudinger, 1891 [1892])
  - Nebrarctia semiramis elbursi (Daniel, 1937)
- Nebrarctia transversa (Moore, 1879)
  - Nebrarctia transversa puella (Staudinger, 1887)
  - Nebrarctia transversa vartianae (Daniel, 1965)
- Nebrarctia wiltshirei (Toulgoët, 1962)
