= Chrysorabdia aurantiaca =

Scientific classification
- Kingdom: Animalia
- Phylum: Arthropoda
- Class: Insecta
- Order: Lepidoptera
- Superfamily: Noctuoidea
- Family: Erebidae
- Subfamily: Arctiinae
- Genus: Chrysorabdia
- Species: C. aurantiaca

Binomial name
- Chrysorabdia aurantiaca Hampson, 1898

Synonyms
- Chrysorhabdia aurantiaca

Species of moth

Chrysorabdia aurantiaca is a moth of the subfamily Arctiinae. It is found in India (Assam).
