= Macrocilix ophrysa =

Scientific classification
- Domain: Eukaryota
- Kingdom: Animalia
- Phylum: Arthropoda
- Class: Insecta
- Order: Lepidoptera
- Family: Drepanidae
- Genus: Macrocilix
- Species: M. ophrysa

Binomial name
- Macrocilix ophrysa Chu & Wang, 1988

Species of hook-tip moth

Macrocilix ophrysa is a moth in the family Drepanidae. It was described by Hong-Fu Chu and Lin-Yao Wang in 1988. It is found in Yunnan, China.

The length of the forewings is about 20 mm.
