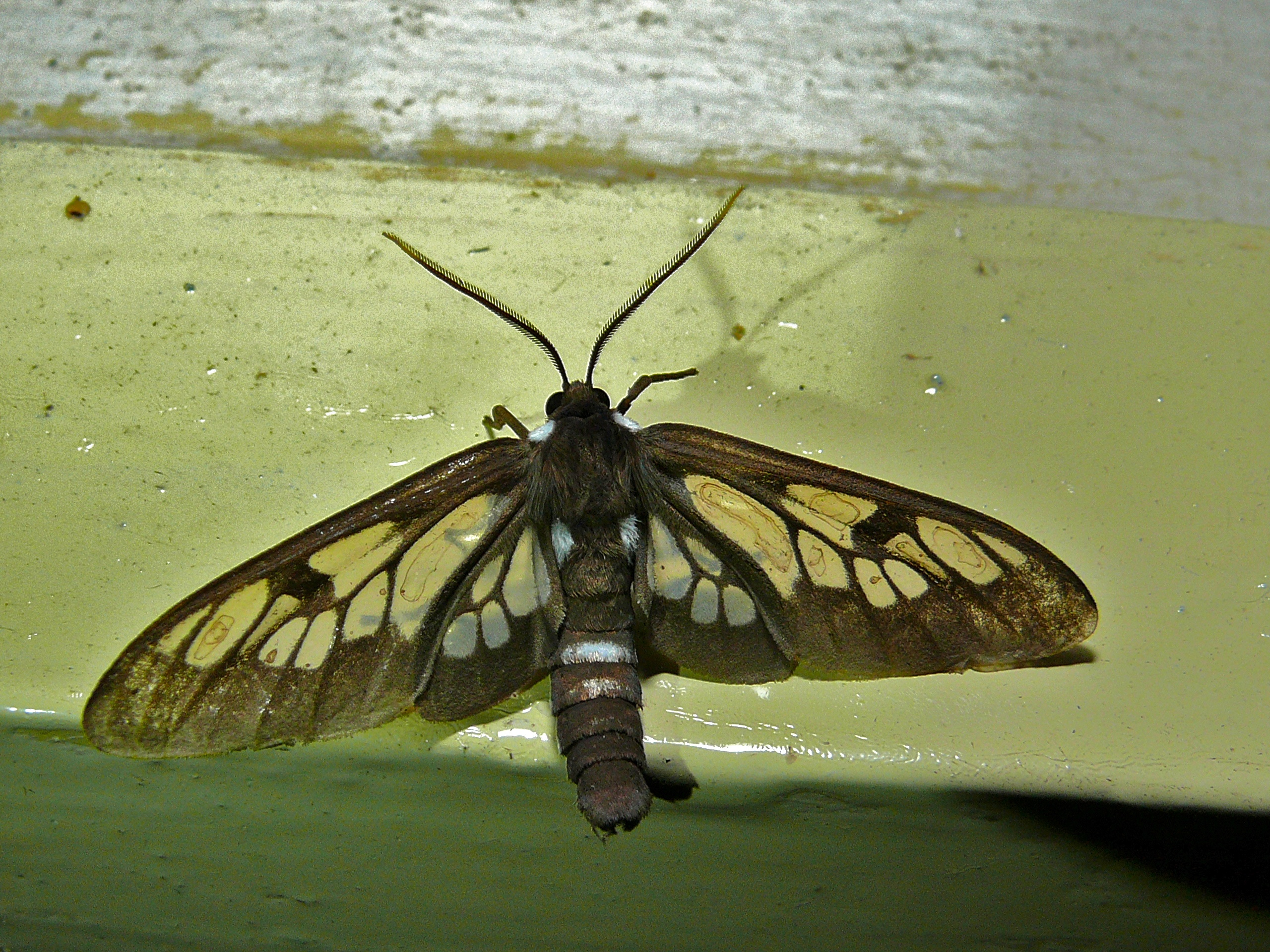
- Syntomin Moth (Caeneressa robusta)

Scientific classification
- Kingdom: Animalia
- Phylum: Arthropoda
- Clade: Pancrustacea
- Class: Insecta
- Order: Lepidoptera
- Superfamily: Noctuoidea
- Family: Erebidae
- Subfamily: Arctiinae
- Genus: Caeneressa
- Species: C. robusta

Binomial name
- Caeneressa robusta (Holloway, 1976)

Synonyms
- Eressa robusta Holloway, 1976

= Caeneressa robusta =

Species of moth

Caeneressa robusta is a moth of the family Erebidae. It was described by Jeremy Daniel Holloway in 1976. It is found on Borneo.
