= Alphaea rothschildi =

Scientific classification
- Kingdom: Animalia
- Phylum: Arthropoda
- Clade: Pancrustacea
- Class: Insecta
- Order: Lepidoptera
- Superfamily: Noctuoidea
- Family: Erebidae
- Subfamily: Arctiinae
- Genus: Alphaea
- Species: A. rothschildi

Binomial name
- Alphaea rothschildi Dubatolov & Kishida, 2005

Synonyms
- Estigmene imbuta khasiana Rothschild, 1910; Nayaca rothschildi

Species of moth

Alphaea rothschildi is a moth of the family Erebidae. It was described by Vladimir Viktorovitch Dubatolov and Yasunori Kishida in 2005. It is found in the Indian states of Assam and Sikkim.
