= Xanthograpta =

Scientific classification
- Kingdom: Animalia
- Phylum: Arthropoda
- Class: Insecta
- Order: Lepidoptera
- Superfamily: Noctuoidea
- Family: Noctuidae
- Subfamily: Acontiinae
- Genus: Xanthograpta; Hampson, 1910

Genus of moths

Xanthograpta is a genus of moths of the family Noctuidae. The genus was erected by George Hampson in 1910.

== Species ==
- Xanthograpta basinigra Sugi, 1982
- Xanthograpta glycychroa Turner, 1904
- Xanthograpta purpurascens Hampson, 1910
- Xanthograpta trilatalis Walker, [1866]
