= Caeneressa tienmushana =

Scientific classification
- Domain: Eukaryota
- Kingdom: Animalia
- Phylum: Arthropoda
- Class: Insecta
- Order: Lepidoptera
- Superfamily: Noctuoidea
- Family: Erebidae
- Subfamily: Arctiinae
- Genus: Caeneressa
- Species: C. tienmushana

Binomial name
- Caeneressa tienmushana Obraztsov, 1957

Species of moth

Caeneressa tienmushana is a species of moth in the family Erebidae. It was described by Obraztsov in 1957. It is found in China (Zhejiang, Fujian).
