= Nebrarctia wiltshirei =

Scientific classification
- Kingdom: Animalia
- Phylum: Arthropoda
- Class: Insecta
- Order: Lepidoptera
- Superfamily: Noctuoidea
- Family: Erebidae
- Subfamily: Arctiinae
- Genus: Nebrarctia
- Species: N. wiltshirei

Binomial name
- Nebrarctia wiltshirei (Toulgoët, 1962)

Synonyms
- Spilosoma wiltshirei Toulgoët, 1962; Andala wiltshirei

Species of moth

Nebrarctia wiltshirei is a moth of the family Erebidae. It was described by Hervé de Toulgoët in 1962. It is found in Kashmir.
