= Alphaea anopunctata =

Scientific classification
- Domain: Eukaryota
- Kingdom: Animalia
- Phylum: Arthropoda
- Class: Insecta
- Order: Lepidoptera
- Superfamily: Noctuoidea
- Family: Erebidae
- Subfamily: Arctiinae
- Genus: Alphaea
- Species: A. anopunctata

Binomial name
- Alphaea anopunctata (Oberthür, 1896)

Synonyms
- Diacrisia anopunctata Oberthür, 1911

Species of moth

Alphaea anopunctata is a moth of the family Erebidae. It was described by Charles Oberthür in 1896. It is found in China (Sichuan, Yunnan).
