= Vamuna =

Scientific classification
- Kingdom: Animalia
- Phylum: Arthropoda
- Clade: Pancrustacea
- Class: Insecta
- Order: Lepidoptera
- Superfamily: Noctuoidea
- Family: Erebidae
- Subfamily: Arctiinae
- Tribe: Lithosiini
- Subtribe: Lithosiina
- Genus: Vamuna; Moore, 1878

Genus of insects

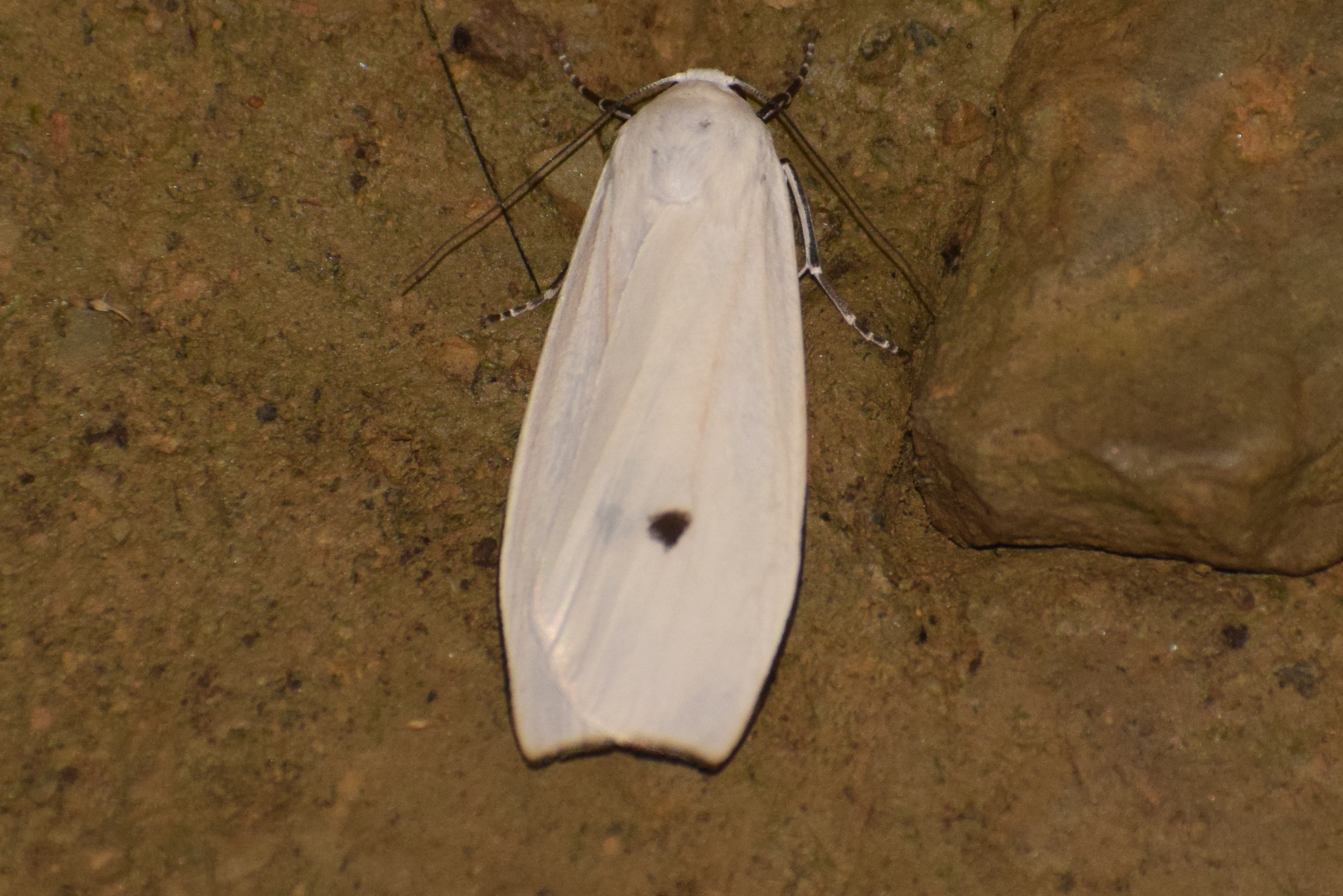
Vamuna

Vamuna is a genus of moths in the subfamily Arctiinae. The genus was erected by Frederic Moore in 1878.

== Species ==
- Vamuna alboluteola Rothschild, 1912
- Vamuna bipars Moore, 1878
- Vamuna maculata Moore, 1878
- Vamuna remelana Moore, [1866]
- Vamuna virilis Rothschild, 1913
