= Alphaea fulvohirta =

Scientific classification
- Kingdom: Animalia
- Phylum: Arthropoda
- Class: Insecta
- Order: Lepidoptera
- Superfamily: Noctuoidea
- Family: Erebidae
- Subfamily: Arctiinae
- Genus: Alphaea
- Species: A. fulvohirta

Binomial name
- Alphaea fulvohirta Walker, 1855

Species of moth

Alphaea fulvohirta is a moth of the family Erebidae. It was described by Francis Walker in 1855. It is found in China (Sichuan, Tibet, Shaanxi), Nepal, Bhutan and India (Sikkim, Assam).
