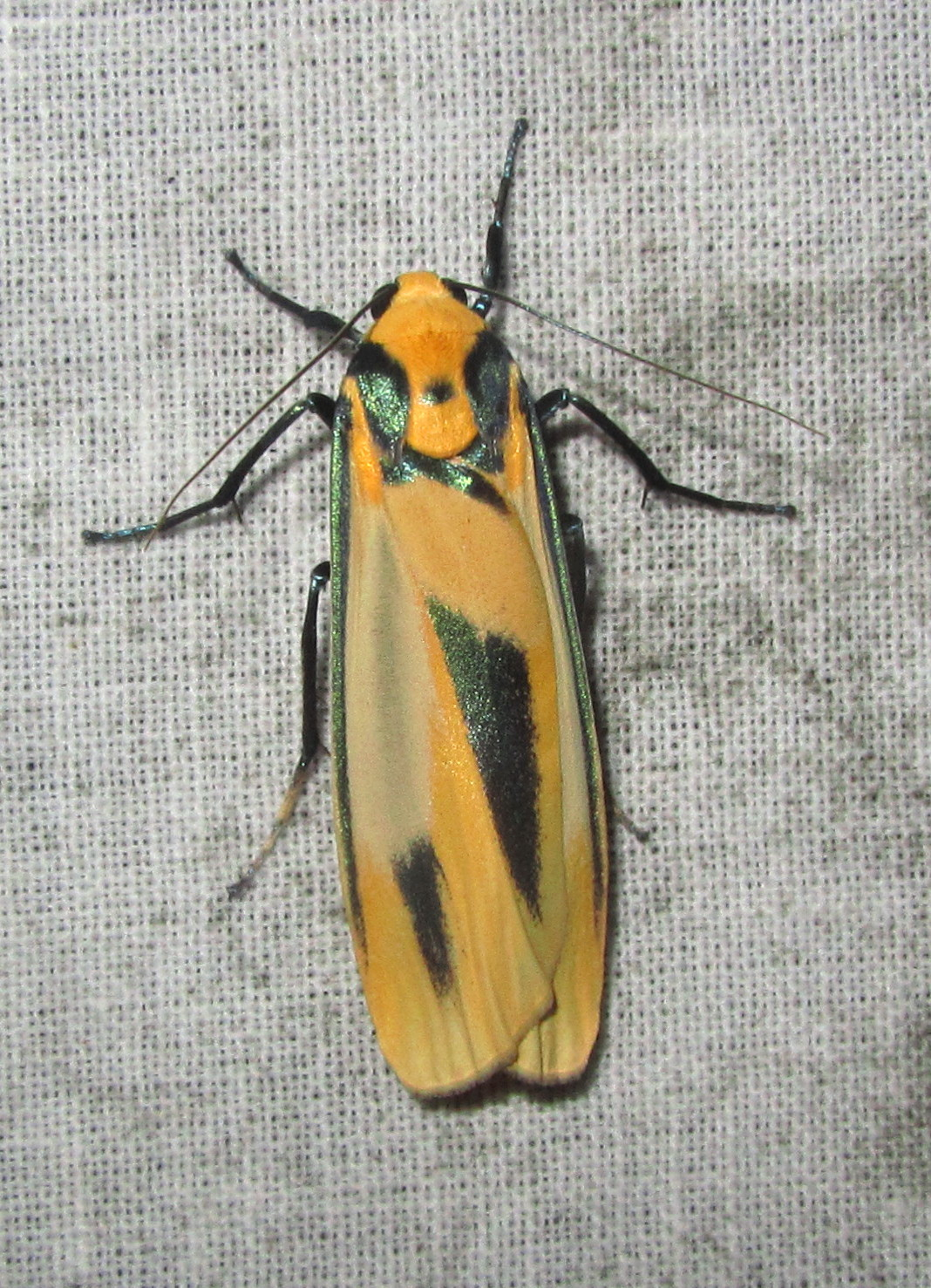

Scientific classification
- Kingdom: Animalia
- Phylum: Arthropoda
- Class: Insecta
- Order: Lepidoptera
- Superfamily: Noctuoidea
- Family: Erebidae
- Subfamily: Arctiinae
- Genus: Chrysorabdia
- Species: C. bivitta

Binomial name
- Chrysorabdia bivitta (Walker, 1856)

Synonyms
- Lithosia bivitta Walker, 1856; Lithosa disjuncta Moore, [1866]

= Chrysorabdia bivitta =

Species of moth

Chrysorabdia bivitta is a moth of the subfamily Arctiinae first described by Francis Walker in 1856. It is found in the north-western Himalayas, Myanmar and the Indian states of Sikkim and Assam.
