= Nebrarctia hunza =

Scientific classification
- Kingdom: Animalia
- Phylum: Arthropoda
- Class: Insecta
- Order: Lepidoptera
- Superfamily: Noctuoidea
- Family: Erebidae
- Subfamily: Arctiinae
- Genus: Nebrarctia
- Species: N. hunza

Binomial name
- Nebrarctia hunza (de Freina, 1997)

Synonyms
- Spilarctia hunza de Freina, 1997; Andala hunza

Species of moth

Nebrarctia hunza is a moth of the family Erebidae. It was described by Josef J. de Freina in 1997. It is found in northern Pakistan.
