= Caeneressa lutosa =

Scientific classification
- Kingdom: Animalia
- Phylum: Arthropoda
- Clade: Pancrustacea
- Class: Insecta
- Order: Lepidoptera
- Superfamily: Noctuoidea
- Family: Erebidae
- Subfamily: Arctiinae
- Genus: Caeneressa
- Species: C. lutosa

Binomial name
- Caeneressa lutosa (Holloway, 1976)

Synonyms
- Callitomis lutosa Holloway, 1976

Species of moth

Caeneressa lutosa is a moth of the family Erebidae. It was described by Jeremy Daniel Holloway in 1976. It is found on Borneo.
