= Caeneressa longipennis =

Scientific classification
- Kingdom: Animalia
- Phylum: Arthropoda
- Class: Insecta
- Order: Lepidoptera
- Superfamily: Noctuoidea
- Family: Erebidae
- Subfamily: Arctiinae
- Genus: Caeneressa
- Species: C. longipennis

Binomial name
- Caeneressa longipennis (Walker, 1862)

Synonyms
- Syntomis longipennis Walker, 1862; Amata leucozonoides Rothschild, 1912

Species of moth

Caeneressa longipennis is a moth of the family Erebidae. It was described by Francis Walker in 1862. It is found on Borneo. The habitat consists of lowland areas.
