= Nebrarctia guttata =

Scientific classification
- Domain: Eukaryota
- Kingdom: Animalia
- Phylum: Arthropoda
- Class: Insecta
- Order: Lepidoptera
- Superfamily: Noctuoidea
- Family: Erebidae
- Subfamily: Arctiinae
- Genus: Nebrarctia
- Species: N. guttata

Binomial name
- Nebrarctia guttata (Erschoff, 1874)

Synonyms
- Arctia guttata Erschoff, 1874; Andala guttata; Diacrisia guttata

Species of moth

Nebrarctia guttata is a moth of the family Erebidae. It was described by Nikolay Grigoryevich Erschoff in 1874. It is found in western Tien Shan, Hissar and eastern Afghanistan.
