= Xanthograpta purpurascens =

Scientific classification
- Kingdom: Animalia
- Phylum: Arthropoda
- Class: Insecta
- Order: Lepidoptera
- Superfamily: Noctuoidea
- Family: Noctuidae
- Genus: Xanthograpta
- Species: X. purpurascens

Binomial name
- Xanthograpta purpurascens Hampson, 1910

Synonyms
- Micrapatetis purpurascens; Xanthograpta pectinata; Eublemma hapalochroa

Species of moth

Xanthograpta purpurascens is a moth of the family Noctuidae first described by George Hampson in 1910. It is found in Australia.
