= Alphaea impleta =

Scientific classification
- Kingdom: Animalia
- Phylum: Arthropoda
- Class: Insecta
- Order: Lepidoptera
- Superfamily: Noctuoidea
- Family: Erebidae
- Subfamily: Arctiinae
- Genus: Alphaea
- Species: A. impleta

Binomial name
- Alphaea impleta (Walker, [1865])

Synonyms
- Hypercompa impleta Walker, 1864; Flavalphaea impleta; Alphaea abdominalis Moore, 1867

Species of moth

Alphaea impleta is a moth of the family Erebidae. It was described by Francis Walker in 1865. It is found in China (Tibet), Nepal and India (Sikkim, Assam).
