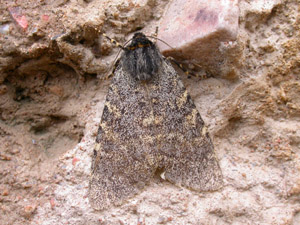

Scientific classification
- Domain: Eukaryota
- Kingdom: Animalia
- Phylum: Arthropoda
- Class: Insecta
- Order: Lepidoptera
- Superfamily: Noctuoidea
- Family: Erebidae
- Subfamily: Arctiinae
- Genus: Carcinopyga
- Species: C. proserpina

Binomial name
- Carcinopyga proserpina (Staudinger, 1887)

Synonyms
- Euarctia proserpina Staudinger, 1887; Carcinopyga lindti Cerný, 1986

= Carcinopyga proserpina =

Species of moth

Carcinopyga proserpina is a moth of the family Erebidae. It was described by Otto Staudinger in 1887. It is found in Uzbekistan, Tajikistan, Kyrgyzstan, Kazakhstan and eastern Afghanistan.

== Subspecies ==
- Carcinopyga proserpina proserpina (Uzbekistan, Tadzhikistan)
- Carcinopyga proserpina lindti Cerny, 1986 (Uzbekistan, Kyrgyzstan, Kazakhstan)
