= Macrocilix trinotata =

Scientific classification
- Domain: Eukaryota
- Kingdom: Animalia
- Phylum: Arthropoda
- Class: Insecta
- Order: Lepidoptera
- Family: Drepanidae
- Genus: Macrocilix
- Species: M. trinotata

Binomial name
- Macrocilix trinotata Chu & Wang, 1988

Species of hook-tip moth

Macrocilix trinotata is a moth in the family Drepanidae. It was described by Hong-Fu Chu and Lin-Yao Wang in 1988. It is found in Xizang, China.

The length of the forewings is about 19 mm.
