= Macrocilix nongloba =

Scientific classification
- Domain: Eukaryota
- Kingdom: Animalia
- Phylum: Arthropoda
- Class: Insecta
- Order: Lepidoptera
- Family: Drepanidae
- Genus: Macrocilix
- Species: M. nongloba

Binomial name
- Macrocilix nongloba Chu & Wang, 1988

Species of hook-tip moth

Macrocilix nongloba is a moth in the family Drepanidae. It was described by Hong-Fu Chu and Lin-Yao Wang in 1988. It is found in the Chinese provinces of Sichuan, Jiangxi and Zhejiang.

The length of the forewings is 13–18 mm. Adults are externally similar to Macrocilix orbifera.
