= Vamuna bipars =

Scientific classification
- Domain: Eukaryota
- Kingdom: Animalia
- Phylum: Arthropoda
- Class: Insecta
- Order: Lepidoptera
- Superfamily: Noctuoidea
- Family: Erebidae
- Subfamily: Arctiinae
- Genus: Vamuna
- Species: V. bipars

Binomial name
- Vamuna bipars Moore, 1878

Species of moth

Vamuna bipars is a moth in the subfamily Arctiinae. It was described by Frederic Moore in 1878. It is found in the Indian states of Assam and Sikkim.
