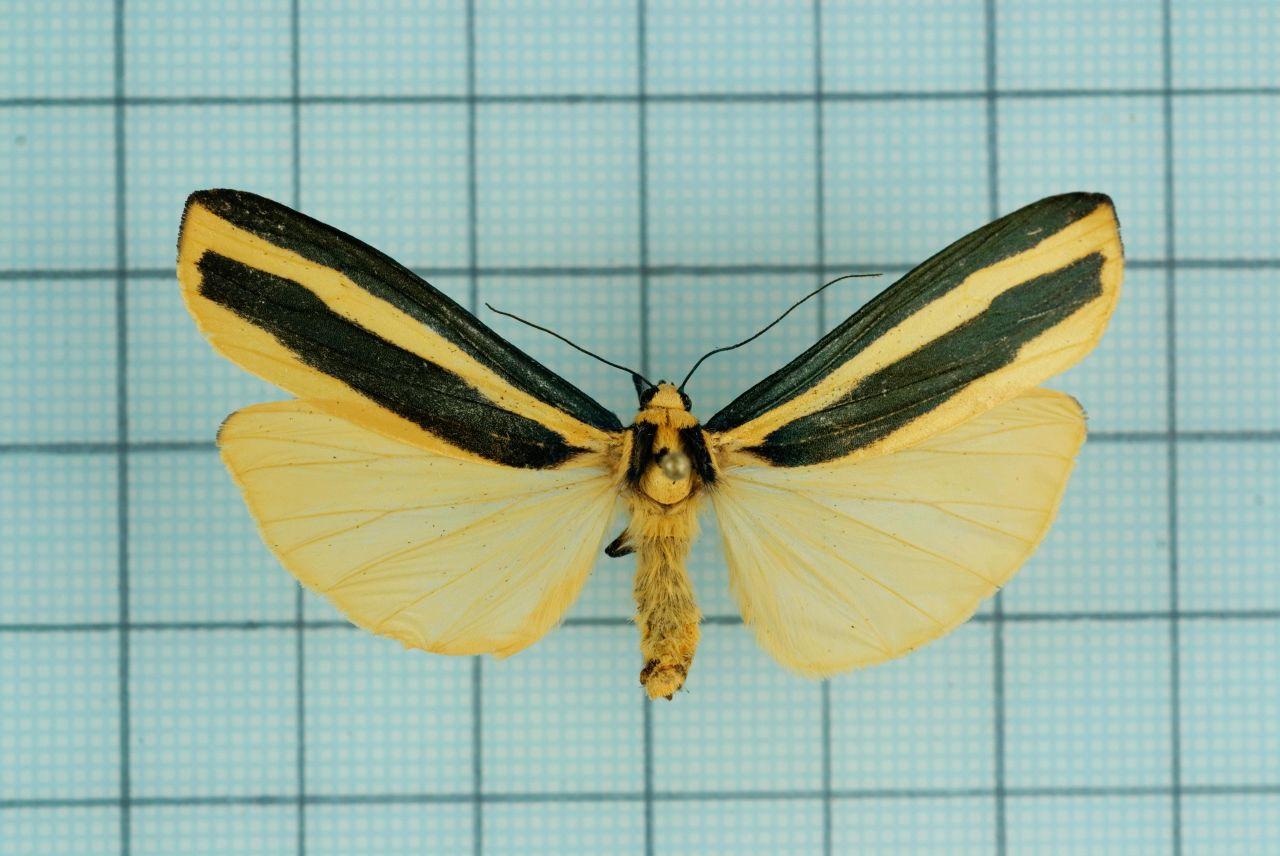

Scientific classification
- Kingdom: Animalia
- Phylum: Arthropoda
- Class: Insecta
- Order: Lepidoptera
- Superfamily: Noctuoidea
- Family: Erebidae
- Subfamily: Arctiinae
- Genus: Chrysorabdia
- Species: C. vilemani

Binomial name
- Chrysorabdia vilemani Hampson, 1911

Synonyms
- Chrysorabdia wilemani Strand, 1922

= Chrysorabdia vilemani =

Species of moth

Chrysorabdia vilemani is a moth of the subfamily Arctiinae. It is found in Taiwan.
