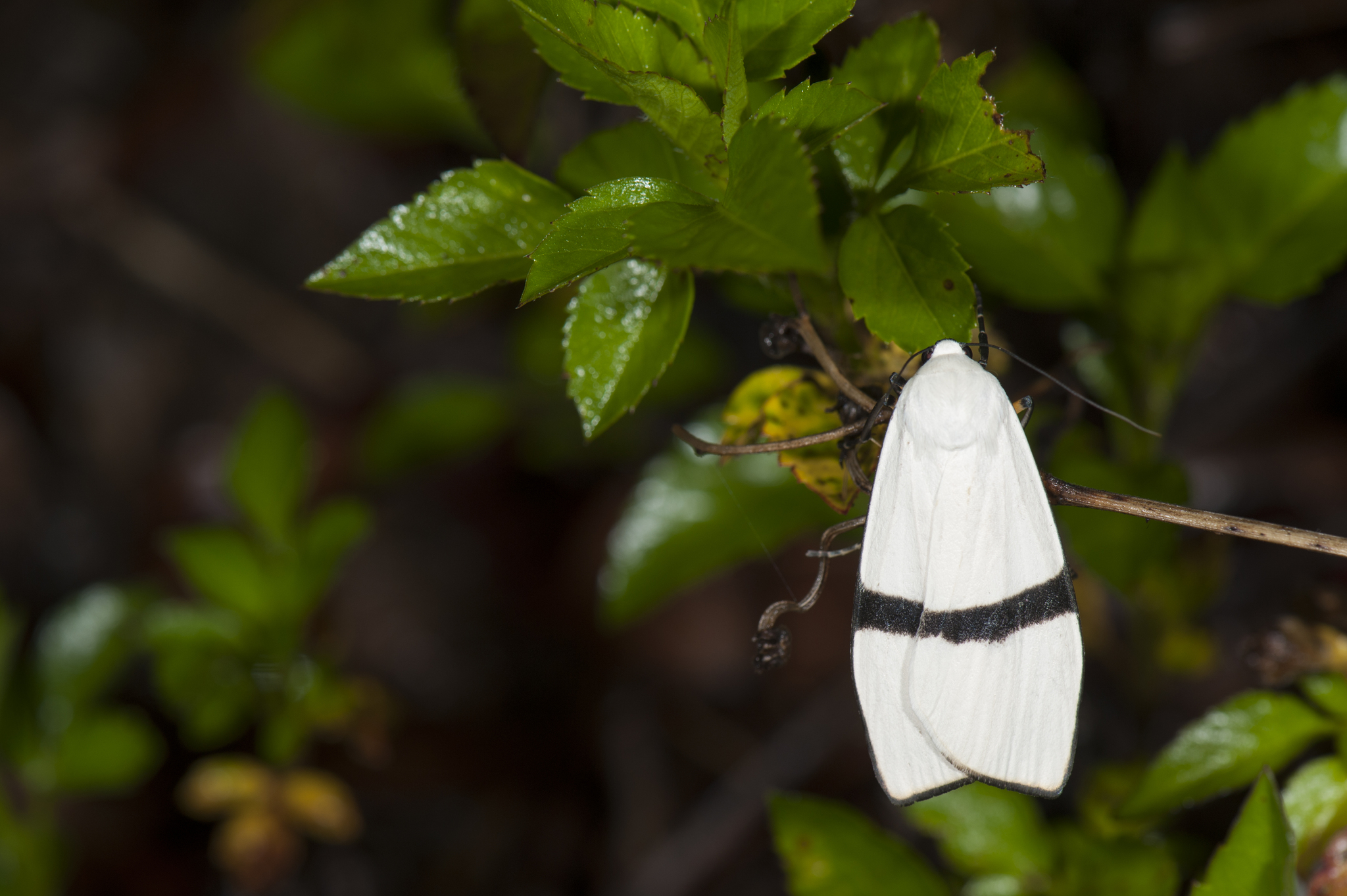

Scientific classification
- Kingdom: Animalia
- Phylum: Arthropoda
- Clade: Pancrustacea
- Class: Insecta
- Order: Lepidoptera
- Superfamily: Noctuoidea
- Family: Erebidae
- Subfamily: Arctiinae
- Genus: Vamuna
- Species: V. alboluteola

Binomial name
- Vamuna alboluteola Rothschild, 1912

= Vamuna alboluteola =

Species of moth

Vamuna alboluteola is a species of moth found in northeast India.

== Description ==
The front of the head and antennae are black. The top of the head and thorax are creamy white, while the abdomen is light brownish-yellow. The forewing is white while the hindwing is light brownish-yellow with a black patch on and above the second and third veins. The forewing is approximately 24 mm in length.
