= Xanthograpta basinigra =

Scientific classification
- Kingdom: Animalia
- Phylum: Arthropoda
- Clade: Pancrustacea
- Class: Insecta
- Order: Lepidoptera
- Superfamily: Noctuoidea
- Family: Noctuidae
- Genus: Xanthograpta
- Species: X. basinigra

Binomial name
- Xanthograpta basinigra Sugi, 1982

Synonyms
- Minigrapta basinigra (Sugi, 1982)

Species of moth

Xanthograpta basinigra is a moth of the family Noctuidae first described by Shigero Sugi in 1982. It is found in Korea, Japan, China and south-eastern Siberia in Russia.
