= Carcinopyga gurkoi =

Scientific classification
- Kingdom: Animalia
- Phylum: Arthropoda
- Clade: Pancrustacea
- Class: Insecta
- Order: Lepidoptera
- Superfamily: Noctuoidea
- Family: Erebidae
- Subfamily: Arctiinae
- Genus: Carcinopyga
- Species: C. gurkoi

Binomial name
- Carcinopyga gurkoi Kautt & Saldaitis, 1997

Species of moth

Carcinopyga gurkoi is a moth of the family Erebidae. It was described by Peter Kautt and Aidas Saldaitis in 1997. It is found in the Pamir Mountains of Tajikistan.
