= Alphaea hongfena =

Scientific classification
- Kingdom: Animalia
- Phylum: Arthropoda
- Clade: Pancrustacea
- Class: Insecta
- Order: Lepidoptera
- Superfamily: Noctuoidea
- Family: Erebidae
- Subfamily: Arctiinae
- Genus: Alphaea
- Species: A. hongfena

Binomial name
- Alphaea hongfena C.-L. Fang, 1983

Species of moth

Alphaea hongfena is a moth of the family Erebidae. It was described by Cheng-Lai Fang in 1983. It is found in Yunnan, China.
