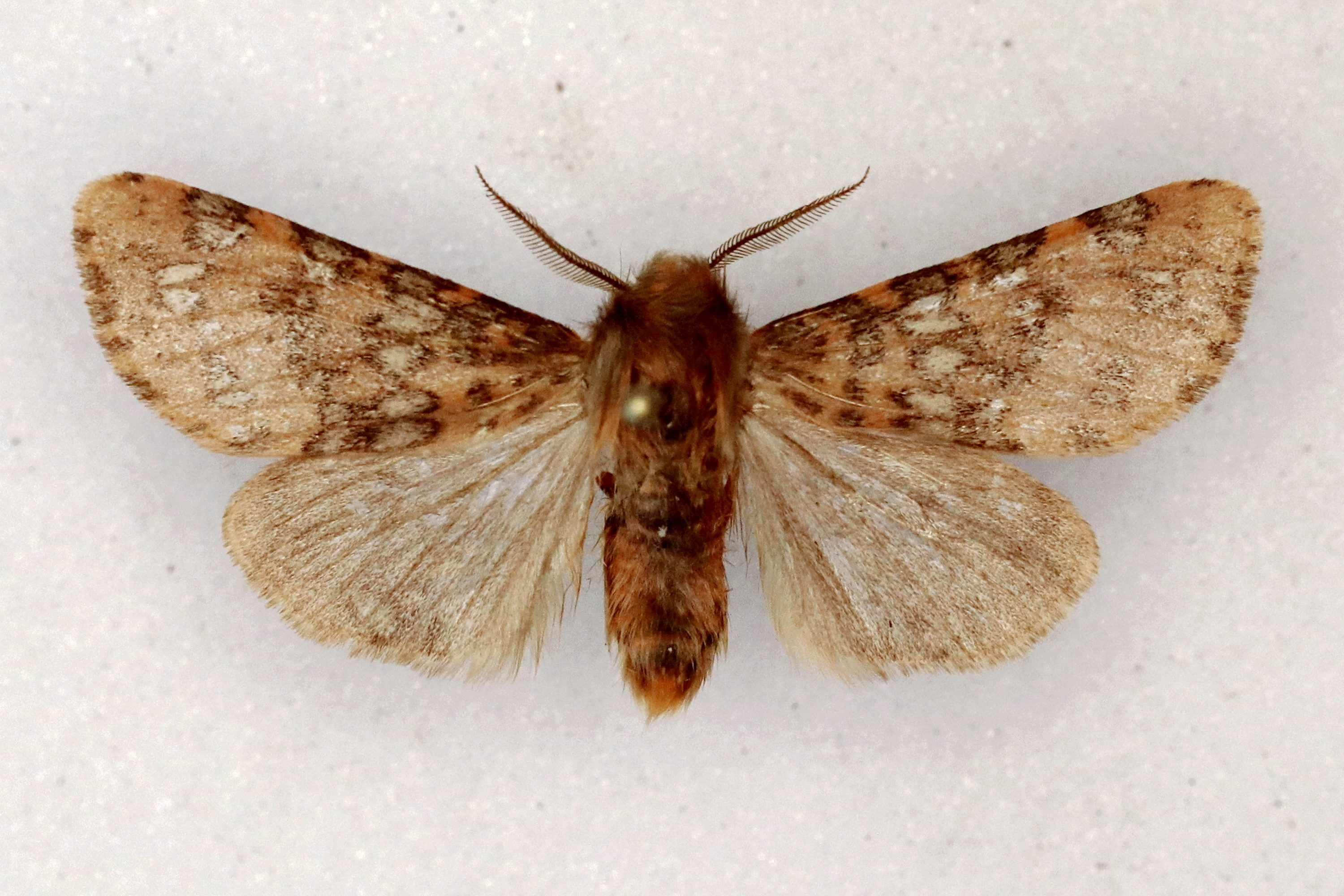

Scientific classification
- Domain: Eukaryota
- Kingdom: Animalia
- Phylum: Arthropoda
- Class: Insecta
- Order: Lepidoptera
- Superfamily: Noctuoidea
- Family: Erebidae
- Subfamily: Arctiinae
- Genus: Nebrarctia
- Species: N. semiramis

Binomial name
- Nebrarctia semiramis (Staudinger, 1891)

Synonyms
- Arctia (Spilarctia) semiramis Staudinger, 1891; Lacydes semiramis; Lacydes semiramis brandti Daniel, 1949; Lacydes (Arctia) ninyas Wagner, 1937

= Nebrarctia semiramis =

Species of moth

Nebrarctia semiramis is a moth of the family Erebidae. It was described by Otto Staudinger in 1891. It is found in Turkey, Pakistan and Iran.

== Subspecies ==
- Nebrarctia semiramis semiramis
- Nebrarctia semiramis elbursi (Daniel, 1937) (Pakistan)
