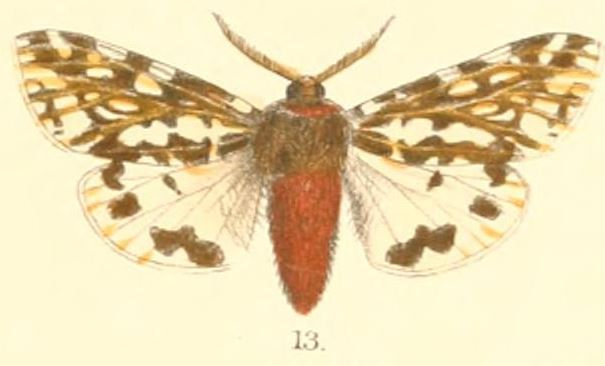

Scientific classification
- Kingdom: Animalia
- Phylum: Arthropoda
- Clade: Pancrustacea
- Class: Insecta
- Order: Lepidoptera
- Superfamily: Noctuoidea
- Family: Erebidae
- Subfamily: Arctiinae
- Genus: Alphaea
- Species: A. florescens

Binomial name
- Alphaea florescens (Moore, 1879)

Synonyms
- Nayaca florescens Moore, 1879

= Alphaea florescens =

Species of moth

Alphaea florescens is a moth of the family Erebidae. It was described by Frederic Moore in 1879. It is found in eastern India (Sikkim, Assam) and Nepal.
