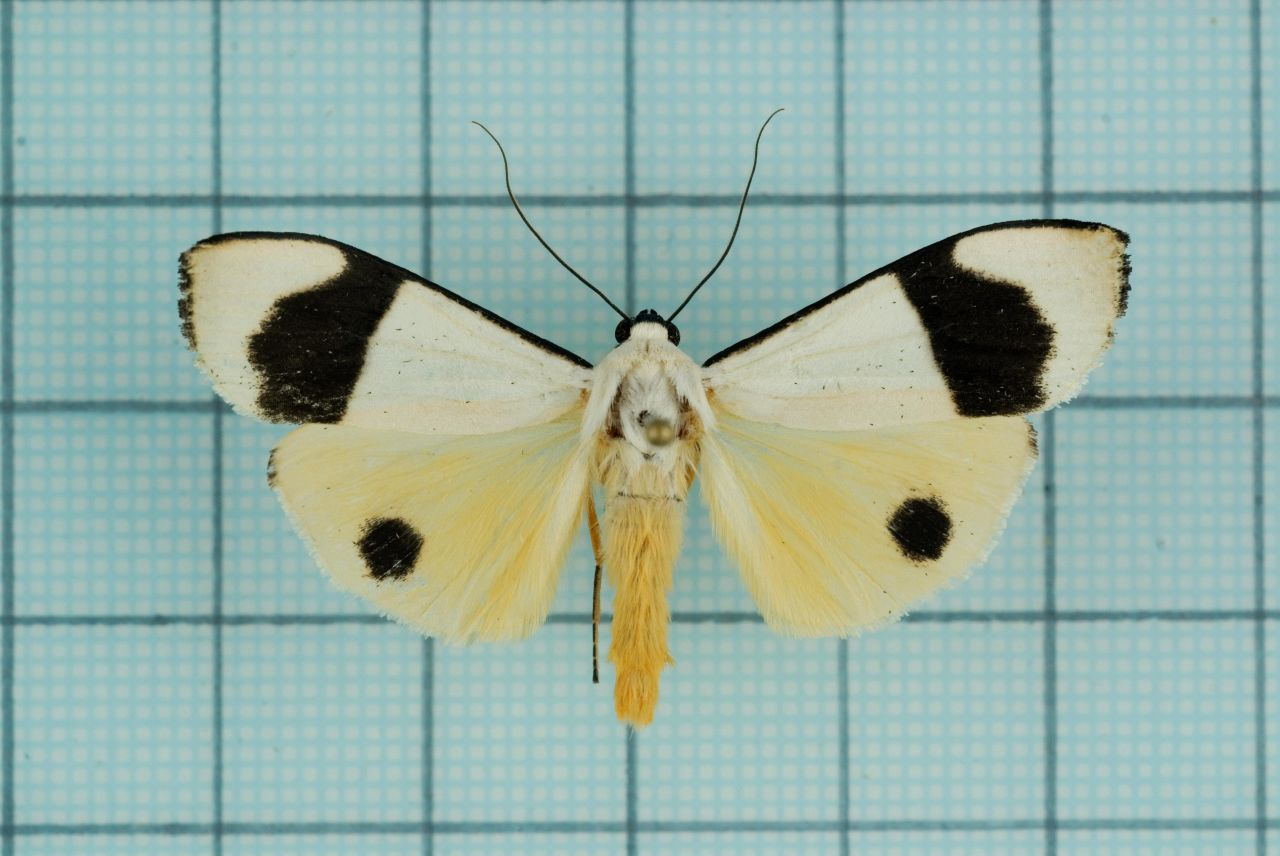
- Male
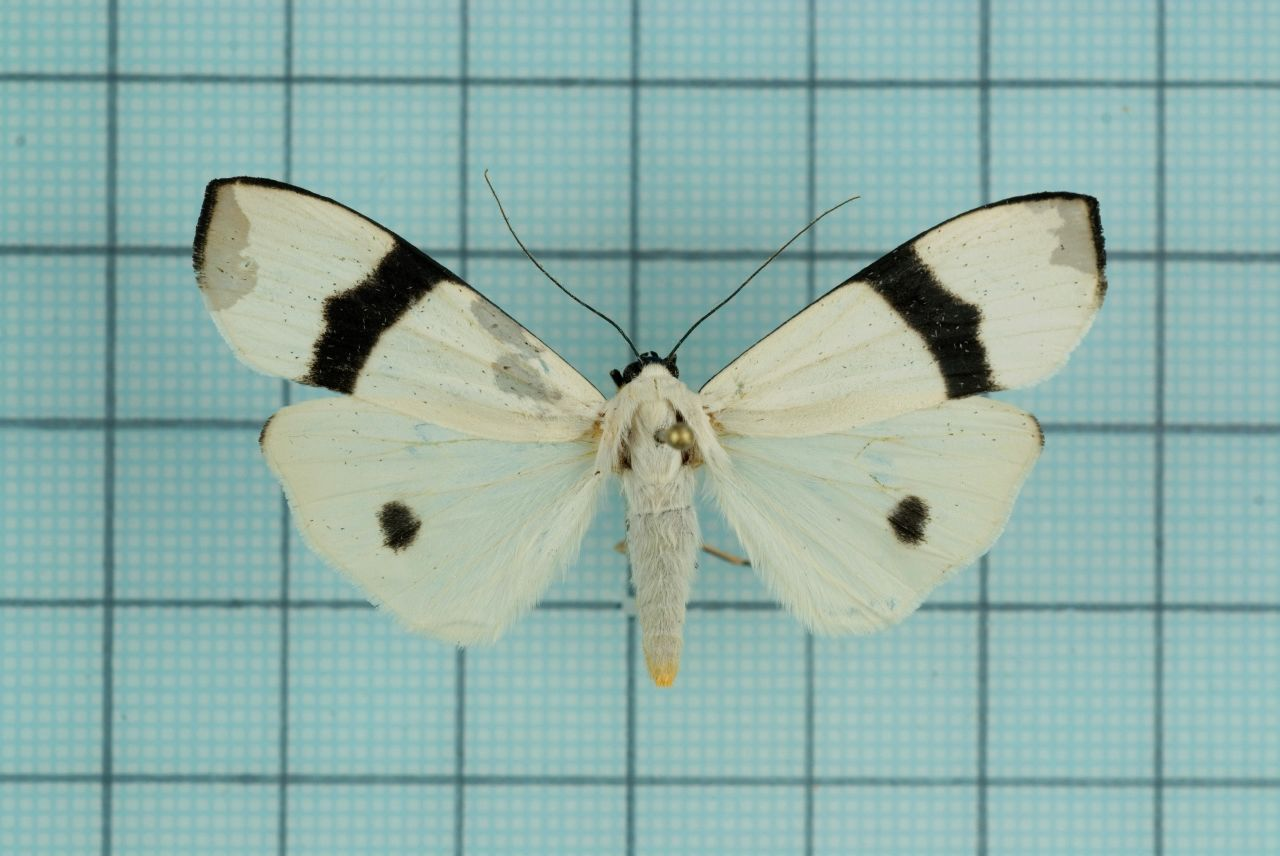
- Female

Scientific classification
- Domain: Eukaryota
- Kingdom: Animalia
- Phylum: Arthropoda
- Class: Insecta
- Order: Lepidoptera
- Superfamily: Noctuoidea
- Family: Erebidae
- Subfamily: Arctiinae
- Genus: Vamuna
- Species: V. virilis

Binomial name
- Vamuna virilis (Rothschild, 1913)

Synonyms
- Agylla virilis Rothschild, 1913

= Vamuna virilis =

Species of moth

Vamuna virilis is a species of moth of the subfamily Arctiinae first described by Rothschild in 1913. It is found in Taiwan, north-eastern Himalaya and Peninsular Malaysia.
