= Pramadea =

Scientific classification
- Domain: Eukaryota
- Kingdom: Animalia
- Phylum: Arthropoda
- Class: Insecta
- Order: Lepidoptera
- Family: Crambidae
- Subfamily: Spilomelinae
- Genus: Pramadea; Moore, 1888

Genus of moths

Pramadea is a genus of moths of the family Crambidae.

== Species ==
- Pramadea crotonalis (Walker, 1859)
- Pramadea denticulata Moore, 1888
- Pramadea lunalis (Guenée, 1854)
- Pramadea ovialis (Walker, 1859)

== Taxonomy ==
The genus was formerly listed as a synonym of Syllepte, but reinstated as a valid genus by Kirti and Gill in 2004.
