= Caeneressa everetti =

Scientific classification
- Kingdom: Animalia
- Phylum: Arthropoda
- Class: Insecta
- Order: Lepidoptera
- Superfamily: Noctuoidea
- Family: Erebidae
- Subfamily: Arctiinae
- Genus: Caeneressa
- Species: C. everetti

Binomial name
- Caeneressa everetti (Rothschild, 1910)

Synonyms
- Eressa everetti Rothschild, 1910

Species of moth

Caeneressa everetti is a moth of the family Erebidae. It was described by Rothschild in 1910. It is found on Borneo and the Natuna Islands. The habitat consists of lowland forests, including alluvial forests.
