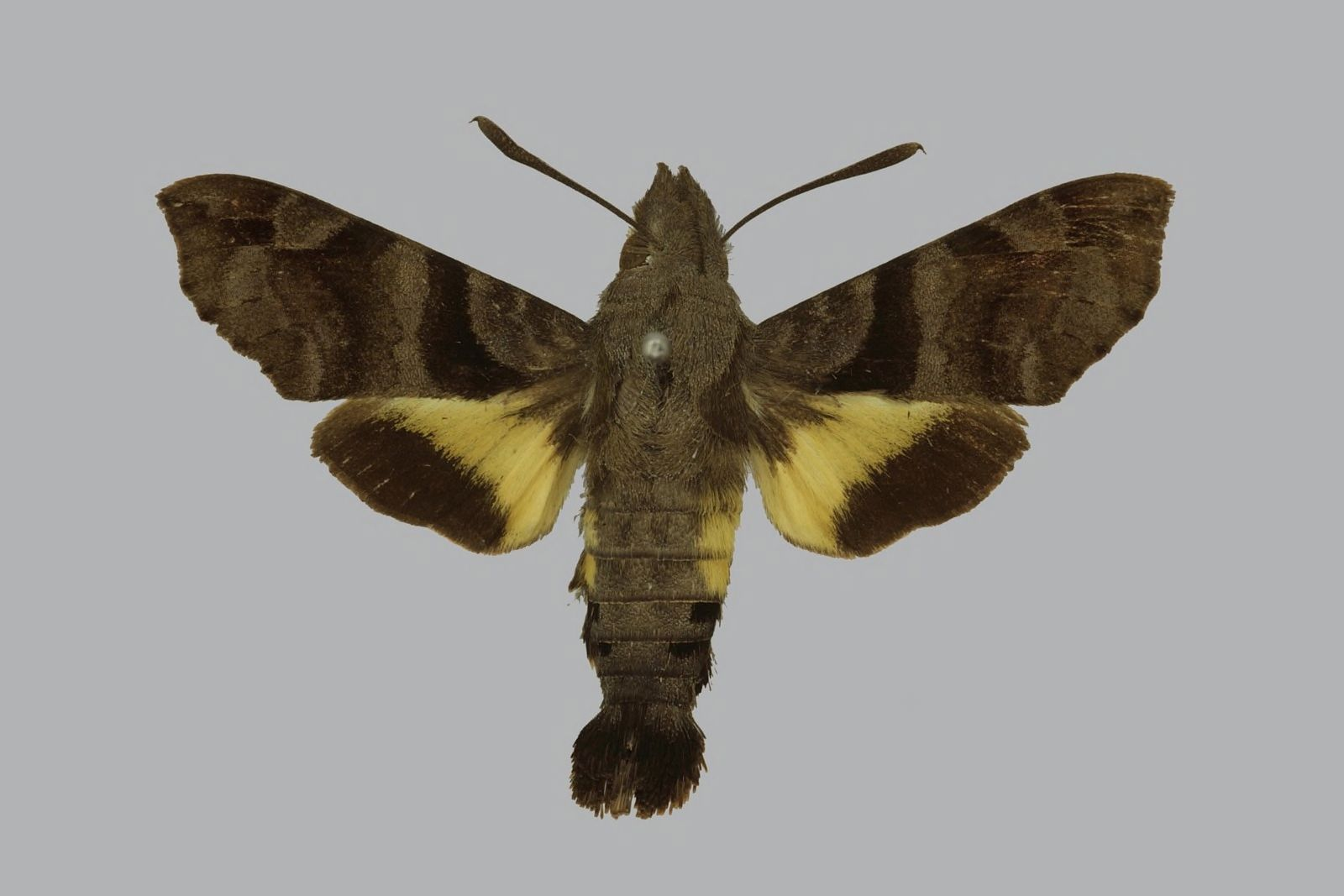

Scientific classification
- Kingdom: Animalia
- Phylum: Arthropoda
- Class: Insecta
- Order: Lepidoptera
- Family: Sphingidae
- Genus: Macroglossum
- Species: M. nycteris

Binomial name
- Macroglossum nycteris Kollar, 1844

Synonyms
- Macroglossa volucris Walker, 1856

= Macroglossum nycteris =

Species of moth in the family Sphingidae

Macroglossum nycteris, the Himalayan hummingbird hawkmoth, is a moth of the family Sphingidae. It's larvae have been recorded feeding on Galium species and Rubia cordifolia.

The wingspan is 40–48 mm (1.6–1.9 in).
