= Xanthograpta trilatalis =

Scientific classification
- Kingdom: Animalia
- Phylum: Arthropoda
- Class: Insecta
- Order: Lepidoptera
- Superfamily: Noctuoidea
- Family: Noctuidae
- Genus: Xanthograpta
- Species: X. trilatalis

Binomial name
- Xanthograpta trilatalis Walker, 1866

Synonyms
- Pyralis trilatalis Walker, [1866]; Xanthograpta trilatalis sobria

Species of moth

Xanthograpta trilatalis is a moth of the family Noctuidae first described by Francis Walker in 1866. It is found in India.
