= Alphaea imbuta =

Scientific classification
- Kingdom: Animalia
- Phylum: Arthropoda
- Class: Insecta
- Order: Lepidoptera
- Superfamily: Noctuoidea
- Family: Erebidae
- Subfamily: Arctiinae
- Genus: Alphaea
- Species: A. imbuta

Binomial name
- Alphaea imbuta (Walker, 1855)

Synonyms
- Arctia imbuta Walker, 1855; Nayaca imbuta; Estigmene var. sikkimensis Rothschild, 1910; Estigmene var. khasiana Rothschild, 1910; Estigmene ab. normalis Rothschild, 1914; Estigmene ab. femina Rothschild, 1914; Estigmene imbuta sikkimensis Rothschild, 1910

Species of moth

Alphaea imbuta is a moth of the family Erebidae. It was described by Francis Walker in 1855. It is found in eastern India, Nepal and Bhutan.

== Subspecies ==
- Alphaea imbuta imbuta (eastern India: north-western Himalayas, Nepal)
- Alphaea imbuta sikkimensis (Rothschild, 1910) (India: Sikkim, Bhutan)
