= Scopula nesciaria =

Scientific classification
- Domain: Eukaryota
- Kingdom: Animalia
- Phylum: Arthropoda
- Class: Insecta
- Order: Lepidoptera
- Family: Geometridae
- Genus: Scopula
- Species: S. nesciaria

Binomial name
- Scopula nesciaria (Walker, 1861)

Synonyms
- Acidalia nesciaria Walker, 1861; Acidalia negataria Walker, 1861; Acidalia absconditaria Walker, 1861

Species of geometer moth in subfamily Sterrhinae

Scopula nesciaria is a moth of the family Geometridae. It was described by Francis Walker in 1861. It is found in Asia including Sri Lanka, China (Hong Kong), the Ryukyu Islands, Taiwan, and Indonesia.

== Subspecies ==
There are two subspecies:

- Scopula nesciaria nesciaria – Sri Lanka
- Scopula nesciaria absconditaria (Walker, 1861) – China, Taiwan, the Ryukyu Islands
