= Asura calamaria =

Scientific classification
- Domain: Eukaryota
- Kingdom: Animalia
- Phylum: Arthropoda
- Class: Insecta
- Order: Lepidoptera
- Superfamily: Noctuoidea
- Family: Erebidae
- Subfamily: Arctiinae
- Genus: Asura
- Species: A. calamaria

Binomial name
- Asura calamaria (Moore, 1888)

Synonyms
- Setina calamaria Moore, 1888; Miltochrista celidopa Meyrick, 1894; Asura celipodoa Seitz, 1910; Asura mediopuncta Rothschild, 1913; Setina punctata Elwes, 1890; Lyclene calamaria Moore, 1888

Species of moth

Asura calamaria is a moth of the family Erebidae first described by Frederic Moore in 1888. It is found in from the north-eastern Himalayas to Sundaland, including Myanmar. The habitat consists of disturbed forests, including disturbed alluvial forests and remnants of primary montane forests.

The larvae have been recorded defoliating Bougainvillea species.
