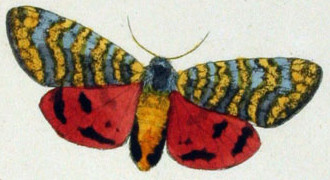

Scientific classification
- Domain: Eukaryota
- Kingdom: Animalia
- Phylum: Arthropoda
- Class: Insecta
- Order: Lepidoptera
- Superfamily: Noctuoidea
- Family: Erebidae
- Subfamily: Arctiinae
- Genus: Carcinopyga
- Species: C. lichenigera

Binomial name
- Carcinopyga lichenigera C. & R. Felder, 1874

= Carcinopyga lichenigera =

Species of moth

Carcinopyga lichenigera is a moth of the family Erebidae. It was described by Cajetan and Rudolf Felder in 1874. It is found in eastern Afghanistan, northern Pakistan, Kashmir and Ladakh.

== Subspecies ==
- Carcinopyga lichenigera lichenigera
- Carcinopyga lichenigera nuytenae de Freina, 1982 (Pakistan)
