= Scopula pallida =

Scientific classification
- Domain: Eukaryota
- Kingdom: Animalia
- Phylum: Arthropoda
- Class: Insecta
- Order: Lepidoptera
- Family: Geometridae
- Genus: Scopula
- Species: S. pallida

Binomial name
- Scopula pallida (Warren, 1888)

Synonyms
- Idaea pallida Warren, 1888; Idaea peralba Swinhoe, 1893

Species of geometer moth in subfamily Sterrhinae

Scopula pallida is a moth of the family Geometridae. It is found in India.
