= Pramadea crotonalis =

Scientific classification
- Domain: Eukaryota
- Kingdom: Animalia
- Phylum: Arthropoda
- Class: Insecta
- Order: Lepidoptera
- Family: Crambidae
- Genus: Pramadea
- Species: P. crotonalis

Binomial name
- Pramadea crotonalis (Walker, 1859)

Synonyms
- Botys crotonalis Walker, 1859

Species of moth

Pramadea crotonalis is a moth in the family Crambidae. It was described by Francis Walker in 1859. It is found in Sri Lanka.
