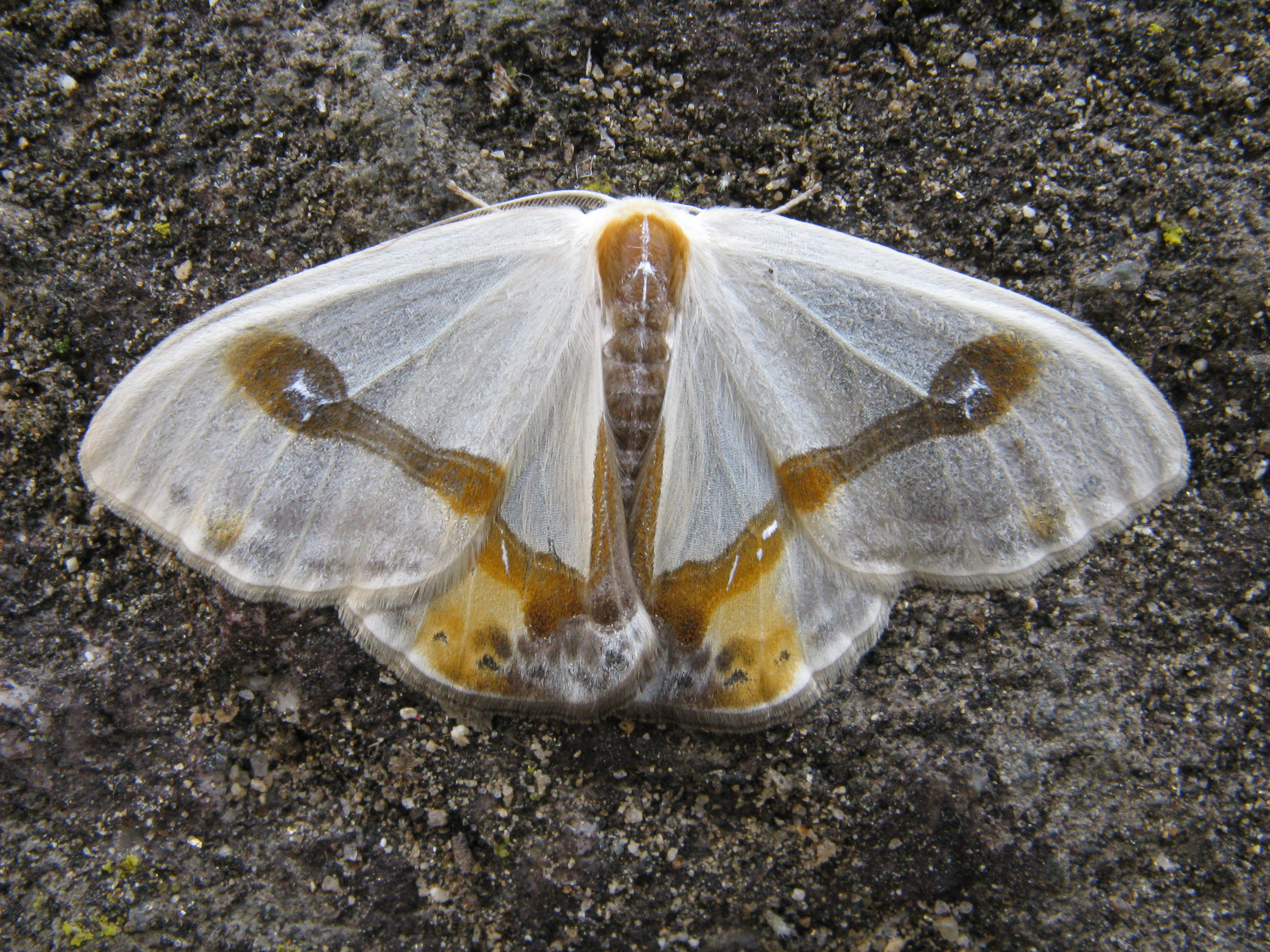
- Macrocilix mysticata watsoni
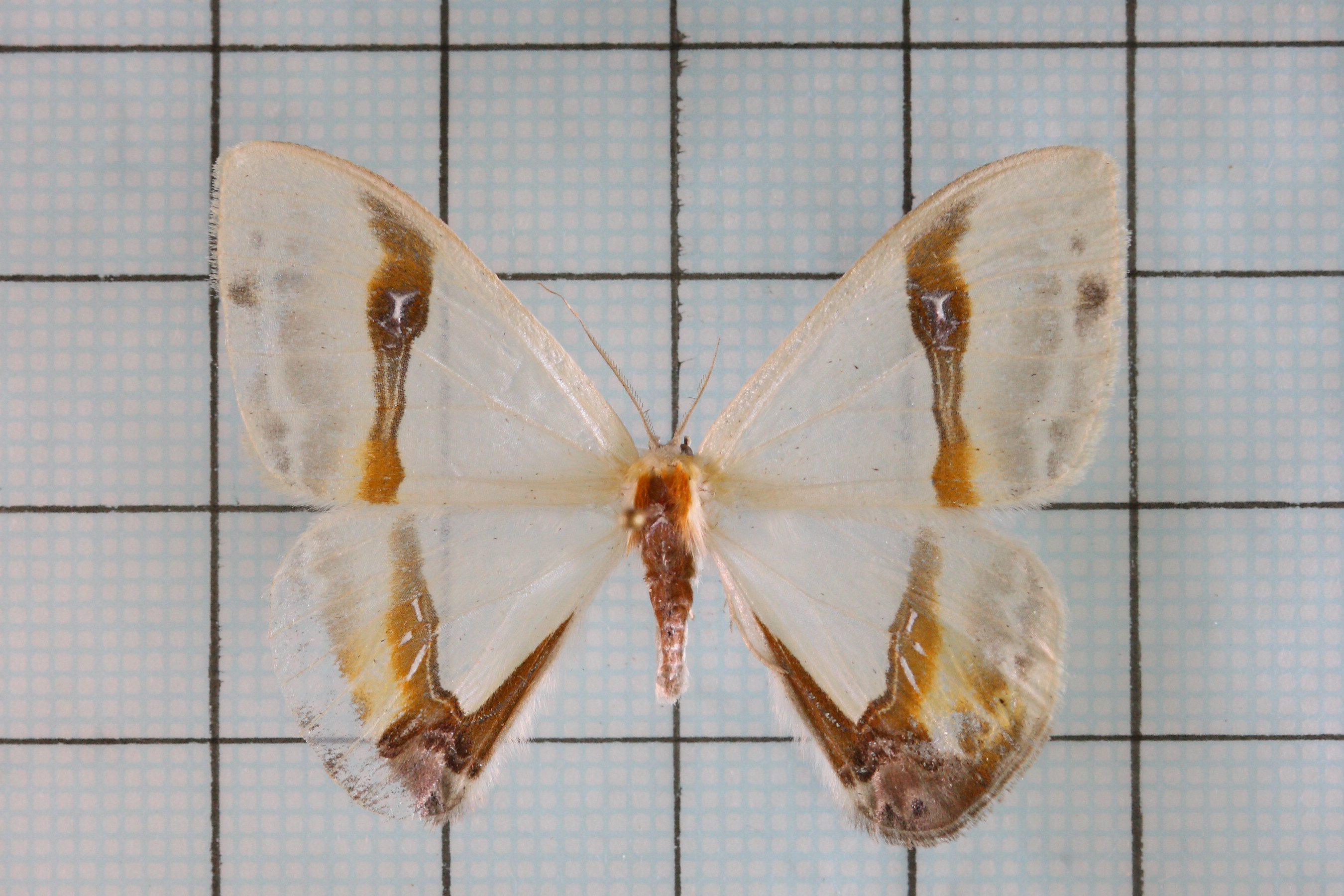
- Macrocilix mysticata watsoni

Scientific classification
- Kingdom: Animalia
- Phylum: Arthropoda
- Class: Insecta
- Order: Lepidoptera
- Family: Drepanidae
- Genus: Macrocilix
- Species: M. mysticata

Binomial name
- Macrocilix mysticata (Walker, [1863])

Synonyms
- Argyris mysticata Walker, [1863]; Macrocilix mysticata bidentata Bryk, 1943; Macrocilix myticata ab. flavotincta Wileman, 1915

= Macrocilix mysticata =

Species of hook-tip moth

Macrocilix mysticata is a moth in the family Drepanidae first described by Francis Walker in 1863. It is found in India, Myanmar, Taiwan, Japan and China.

The wingspan is 31–38 mm. Adults are on wing in March and August.

The larvae feed on the leaves of Castanopsis formosana and Pasania konishii.

== Subspecies ==
- Macrocilix mysticata mysticata (northern India, Sikkim, Myanmar)
- Macrocilix mysticata brevinotata Watson, 1968 (China: Sichuan)
- Macrocilix mysticata campana H.F. Chu & L.Y. Wang, 1988 (China: Sichuan, Zhejiang, Jiangxi, Guangxi, Fujian)
- Macrocilix mysticata flavotincta Wileman, 1915 (Taiwan)
- Macrocilix mysticata watsoni Inoue, 1958 (Japan, China: Fujian, Zhejiang, Guangdong, Yunnan, Sichuan)
