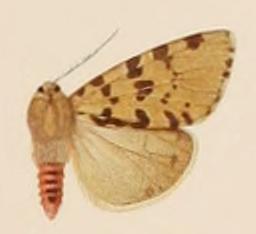

Scientific classification
- Domain: Eukaryota
- Kingdom: Animalia
- Phylum: Arthropoda
- Class: Insecta
- Order: Lepidoptera
- Superfamily: Noctuoidea
- Family: Erebidae
- Subfamily: Arctiinae
- Genus: Nebrarctia
- Species: N. transversa

Binomial name
- Nebrarctia transversa (Moore, 1879)

Synonyms
- Cycnia transversa Moore, 1879; Alphaea transversa; Andala transversa; Spilosoma puella Staudinger, 1887; Alphaea transversa puella; Andala transversa puella; Alphaea puella vartianae Daniel, 1965; Spilosoma saleemi Nargis Viqar, 2004

= Nebrarctia transversa =

Species of moth

Nebrarctia transversa is a moth of the family Erebidae. It is found in India, Pakistan, Afghanistan and Tajikistan.

== Subspecies ==
- Nebrarctia transversa transversa (north-western India and western Pakistan)
- Nebrarctia transversa puella (Staudinger, 1887) (central Asia)
- Nebrarctia transversa vartianae (Daniel, 1965) (eastern Afghanistan)
