= Vamuna maculata =

Scientific classification
- Domain: Eukaryota
- Kingdom: Animalia
- Phylum: Arthropoda
- Class: Insecta
- Order: Lepidoptera
- Superfamily: Noctuoidea
- Family: Erebidae
- Subfamily: Arctiinae
- Genus: Vamuna
- Species: V. maculata

Binomial name
- Vamuna maculata (Moore, 1878)

Synonyms
- Agylla maculata Moore, 1878; Agylla maculifascia Roepke, 1943

Species of moth

Vamuna maculata is a moth in the subfamily Arctiinae. It was described by Frederic Moore in 1878. It is found in India (Arunachal Pradesh, Darjeeling, Nagaland, North India to Malaya, Sikkim) and on Peninsular Malaysia, Sumatra and Borneo.
