= Capissa =

Scientific classification
- Domain: Eukaryota
- Kingdom: Animalia
- Phylum: Arthropoda
- Class: Insecta
- Order: Lepidoptera
- Superfamily: Noctuoidea
- Family: Erebidae
- Subfamily: Arctiinae
- Genus: Capissa; Moore, 1878
- Species: C. vagesa

Binomial name
- Capissa vagesa (Moore, [1860])

Synonyms
- Lithosia vagesa Moore, [1860]; Eilema vagesa; Lithosia innotata Butler, 1877; Capissa auriflava Moore, 1878; Capissa flavens Moore, 1878

Genus of moths

Capissa is a monotypic tiger moth genus in the family Erebidae. It was previously treated as a synonym of Eilema. Its only species, Capissa vagesa, is found in the north-western Himalayas, Kashmir, Nepal and Upper Myanmar. Both the genus and species were first described by Frederic Moore; the genus in 1878 and the species in 1860.
