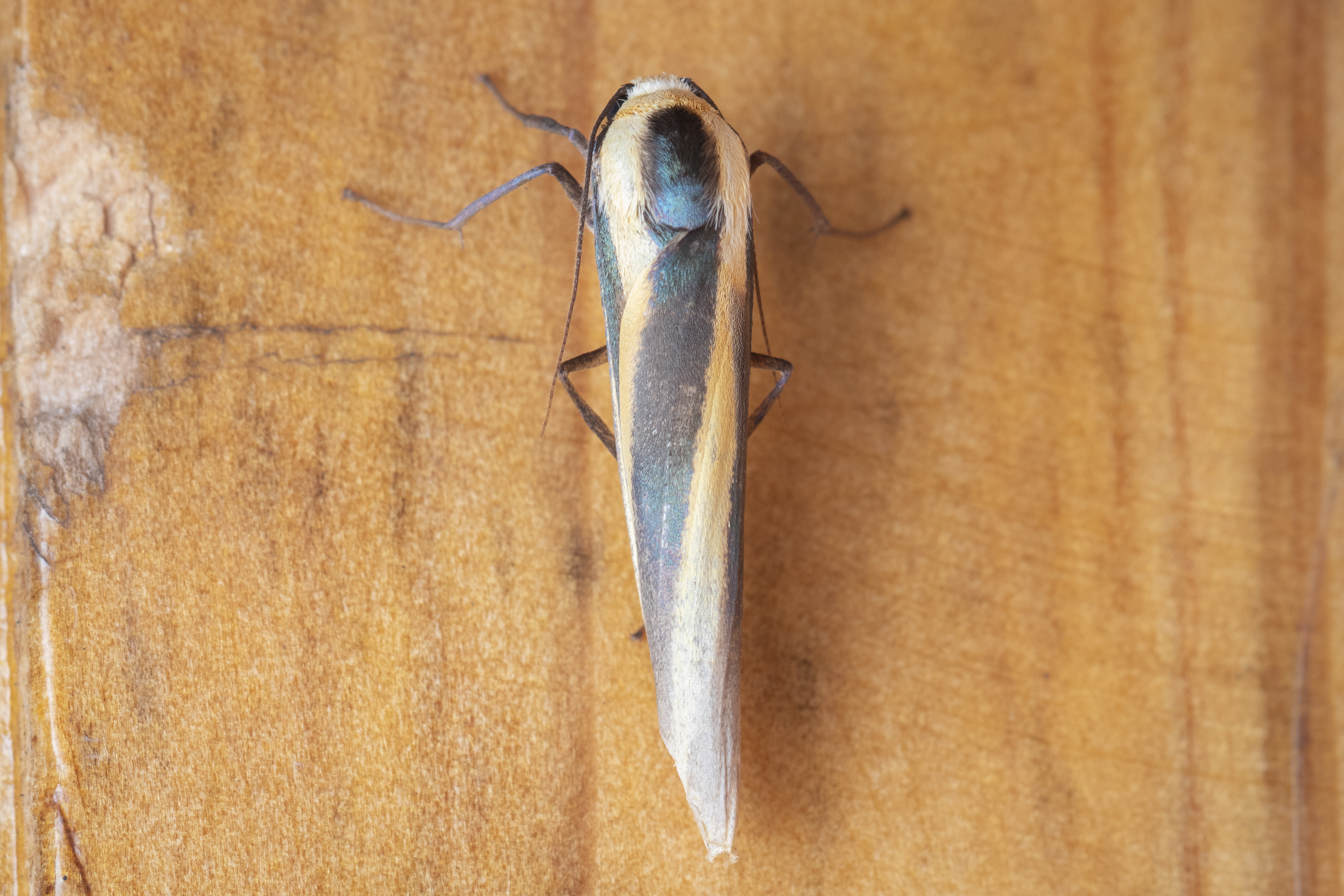
- Chrysorabdia viridata

Scientific classification
- Kingdom: Animalia
- Phylum: Arthropoda
- Clade: Pancrustacea
- Class: Insecta
- Order: Lepidoptera
- Superfamily: Noctuoidea
- Family: Erebidae
- Subfamily: Arctiinae
- Genus: Chrysorabdia
- Species: C. viridata

Binomial name
- Chrysorabdia viridata (Walker, [1865])

Synonyms
- Lithosia viridata Walker, [1865]; Gnophria strigata Möschler, 1872

= Chrysorabdia viridata =

Species of moth

Chrysorabdia viridata is a moth of the subfamily Arctiinae first described by Francis Walker in 1865. It is found in the Indian states of Sikkim and Assam.
