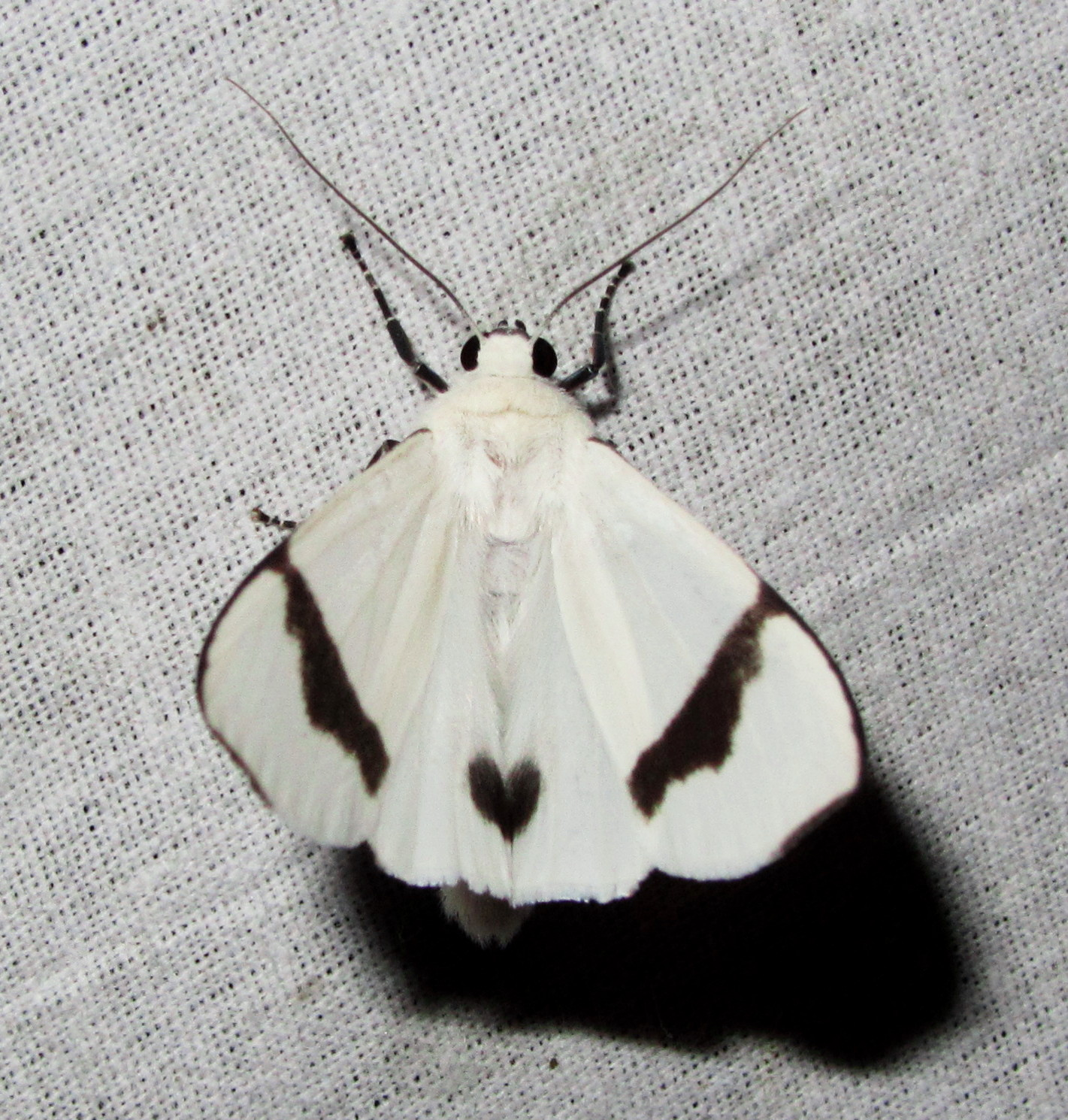

Scientific classification
- Domain: Eukaryota
- Kingdom: Animalia
- Phylum: Arthropoda
- Class: Insecta
- Order: Lepidoptera
- Superfamily: Noctuoidea
- Family: Erebidae
- Subfamily: Arctiinae
- Genus: Vamuna
- Species: V. remelana

Binomial name
- Vamuna remelana (Moore, [1866])

Synonyms
- Lithosia remelana Moore, [1866]; Agylla ramelana; Vamuna ramelana; Gnophria quadrimaculata Möschler, 1872; Agylla ramelana ab. obsoleta Draudt, 1914; Agylla ramelana ab. restricta Draudt, 1914; Agylla remelana semiobseoleta Holloway, 1976

= Vamuna remelana =

Species of moth

Vamuna remelana is a species of moth of the subfamily Arctiinae first described by Frederic Moore in 1866. It is found in India (Arunachal Pradesh, Assam, Mizoram, Sikkim, Uttarakhand, West Bengal), Peninsular Malaysia, Sumatra, Borneo and Java.
