= Andala =

Scientific classification
- Kingdom: Animalia
- Phylum: Arthropoda
- Class: Insecta
- Order: Lepidoptera
- Superfamily: Noctuoidea
- Family: Erebidae
- Subfamily: Arctiinae
- Genus: Andala; Walker, 1855
- Species: A. unifascia

Binomial name
- Andala unifascia Walker, 1855

Synonyms
- Alphaea varia Walker, [1865]; Diacrisia unifascia

Genus of moths

Andala is a monotypic tiger moth genus in the family Erebidae. Its only species, Andala unifascia, is found in the north-western Himalayas, Murree and Kussowlee. Both the genus and species were first described by Francis Walker in 1855.
