= Vincenz Kollar =

Austrian entomologist (1797–1860)

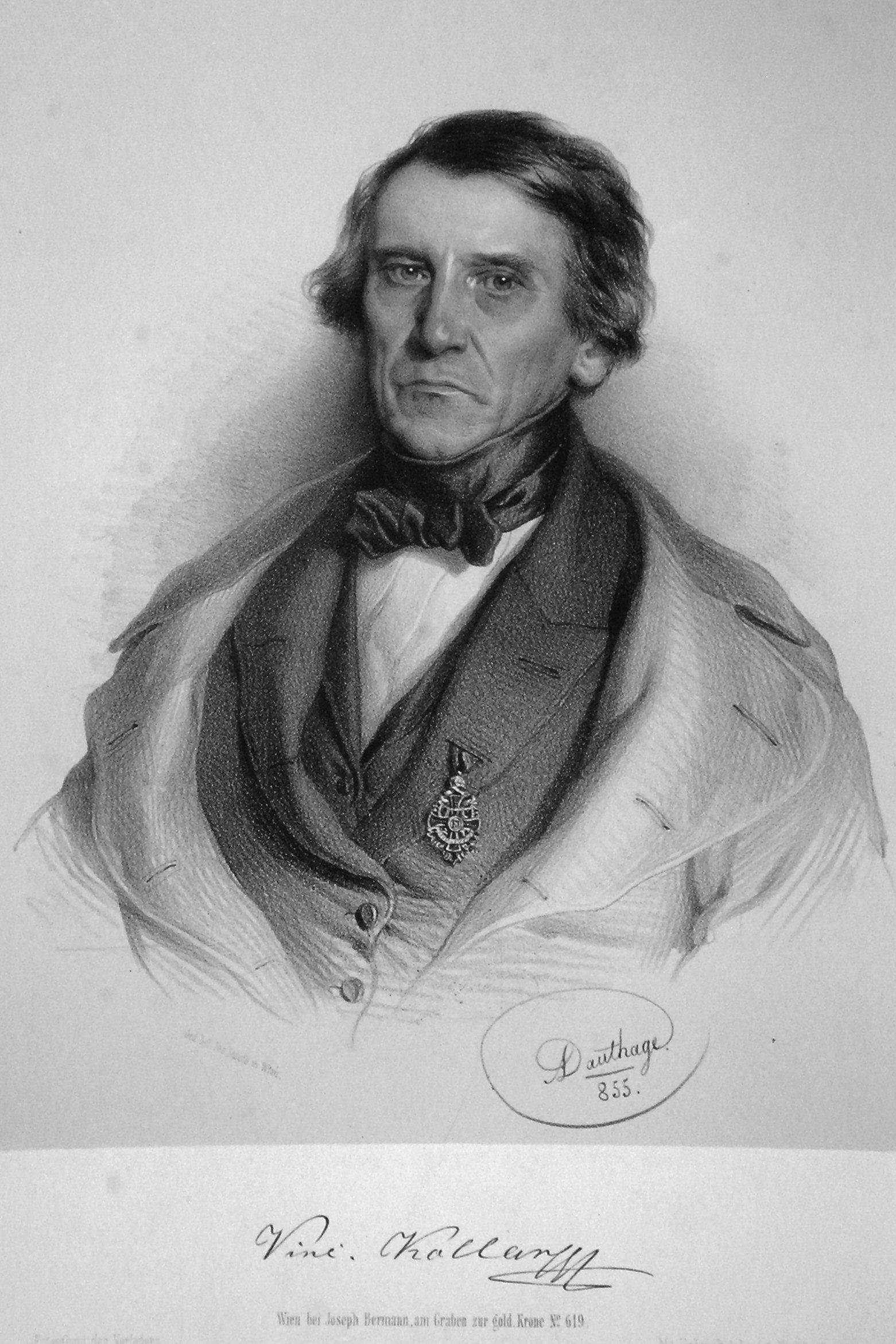
Vincenz Kollar, lithograph by Adolf Dauthage (1855)

Vincenz Kollar (15 January 1797 – 30 May 1860) was an Austrian entomologist who specialised in the Diptera. He was especially concerned with species of economic interest, particularly those of forests. Kollar described many new species. He was Curator of the Natural History Museum in Vienna. He worked mainly on insects collected on expeditions, especially that from the Austrian Brazil Expedition of 1817–1835.

== Life ==
Kollar was born n 15 January 1797 in a farming household in Kranowitz, Silesia (now Krzanowice, Poland), where he received his early education. From 1807, he went to the Leobschütz Gymnasium where he became interested in natural history through a teacher named A. J. Schramm. In 1815 he went to the University of Vienna to study medicine and in 1817 he met Ziegler and volunteered to work at the Imperial Cabinet under Karl von Schreibers. In 1819, he was entrusted with the entomology collections and in 1824 he was offered a first supervisor permission with a salary of 800 guilders. In 1835 he became a curator and following Schreibers' retirement in 1851 he took charge of the zoology collections. He retained the position until his death. In 1854 he was awarded the knight's cross of the Imperial Order of Franz Joseph. He wrote several major works including a catalogue of the butterflies of Austria. He examined the collections of Baron von Hügel in Asia. He also translated works from English into German. He died on 30 May 1860 in Vienna, after long suffering from a throat ailment.

== Works ==
- Die vorzüglich lästigen Insekten Brasiliens, p. 101-119. In J.E. Pohl. Reise im Innern von Brasiliens, vol. I, 448p.(1832)
- Aufzählung und Beschreibung der von Freih. Carl v. Hügel auf seiner Reise durch Kaschmir und das Himalayagebirge gesammelten Insekten. (mit L. Redtenbacher). 4(2):393-564, 582–585, 28 colour plates (1848).
- Über Agrilus viridis Kiesw. ein die Erlen verwüstendes Insekt. Verhandlungen der Zoologische-botanische Geselschaft, Wien 8:325-328.(1858)
