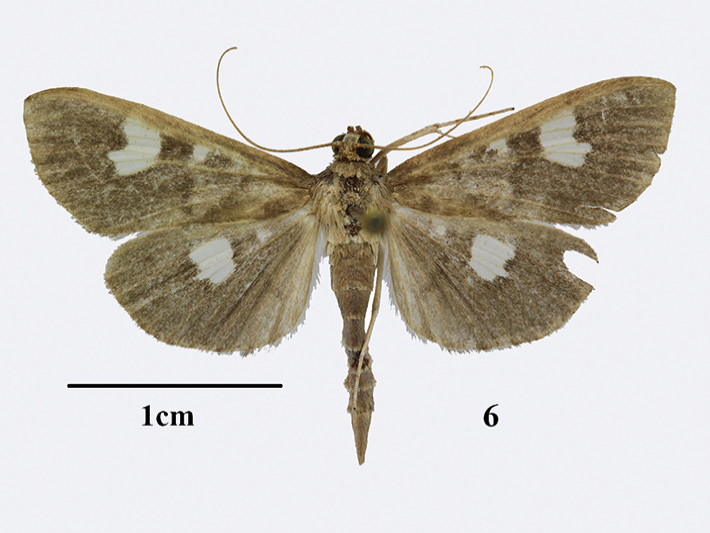
- Nagiella quadrimaculalis, adult male

Scientific classification
- Kingdom: Animalia
- Phylum: Arthropoda
- Clade: Pancrustacea
- Class: Insecta
- Order: Lepidoptera
- Family: Crambidae
- Subfamily: Spilomelinae
- Tribe: Agroterini; Acloque, 1897

= Agroterini =

Tribe of moths

Agroterini is a tribe of the species-rich subfamily Spilomelinae in the pyraloid moth family Crambidae. The tribe was erected by Alexandre Noël Charles Acloque in 1897.

== Genera ==
Agroterini currently encompasses 32 genera, altogether comprising 645 species:

- Aetholix Lederer, 1863
- Agrotera Schrank, 1802
- Aiyura Munroe, 1974
- Chalcidoptera Butler, 1887
- Chilochromopsis Munroe, 1964
- Coenostolopsis Munroe, 1960
- Diastictis Hübner, 1818
- Framinghamia Strand, 1920
- Glaucobotys Maes, 2008
- Goliathodes Munroe, 1974
- Gypodes Munroe, 1976
- Haritalodes Warren, 1890
- Lygropia Lederer, 1863
- Lypotigris Hübner, 1825
- Micromartinia Amsel, 1957
- Microthyris Lederer, 1863
- Nagiella Munroe, 1976
- Neoanalthes Yamanaka & Kirpichnikova, 1993
- Nosophora Lederer, 1863
- Notarcha Meyrick, 1884
- Pantographa Lederer, 1863
- Paranacoleia Inoue, 1982
- Patania Moore, 1888
- Phaedropsis Warren, 1890
- Phostria Hübner, 1819
- Phryganodes Guenée, 1854
- Purpurata Xue, Lu & Du, 2024
- Suhela Singh, Ranjan, Kirti & Chandra, 2022
- Syllepte Hübner, 1819–1821
- Tetracona Meyrick, 1884
- Tylostega Meyrick, 1894
- Ulopeza Zeller, 1852
