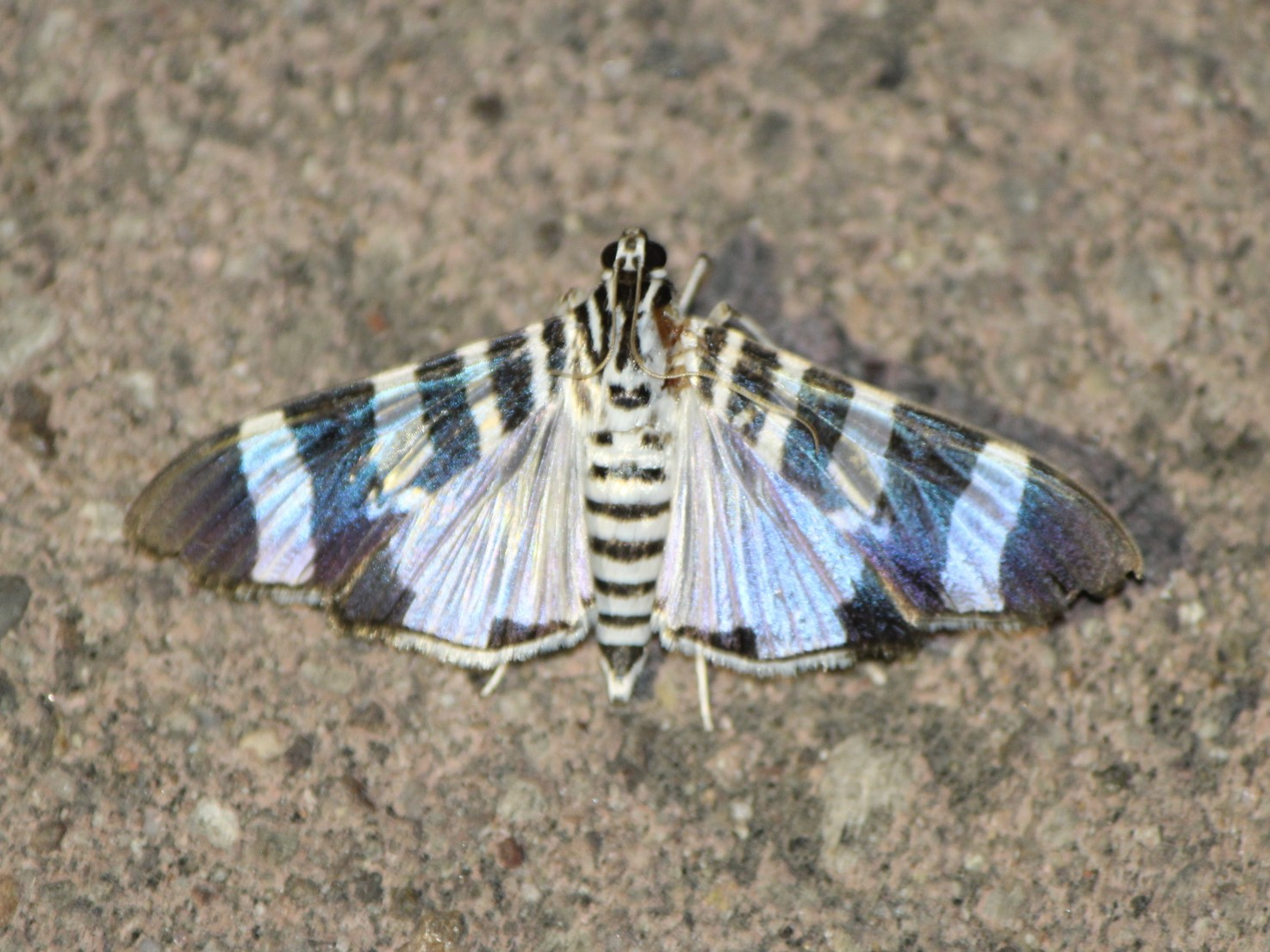

Scientific classification
- Domain: Eukaryota
- Kingdom: Animalia
- Phylum: Arthropoda
- Class: Insecta
- Order: Lepidoptera
- Family: Crambidae
- Genus: Lypotigris
- Species: L. reginalis

Binomial name
- Lypotigris reginalis (Stoll in Cramer & Stoll, 1781)

Synonyms
- Phalaena Pyralis reginalis Stoll in Cramer & Stoll, 1781

= Lypotigris reginalis =

Species of moth

Lypotigris reginalis is a moth in the family Crambidae. It was described by Caspar Stoll in 1781. It is found in Suriname, Trinidad and Tobago, Central America (Costa Rica, Honduras), the West Indies and Florida.
