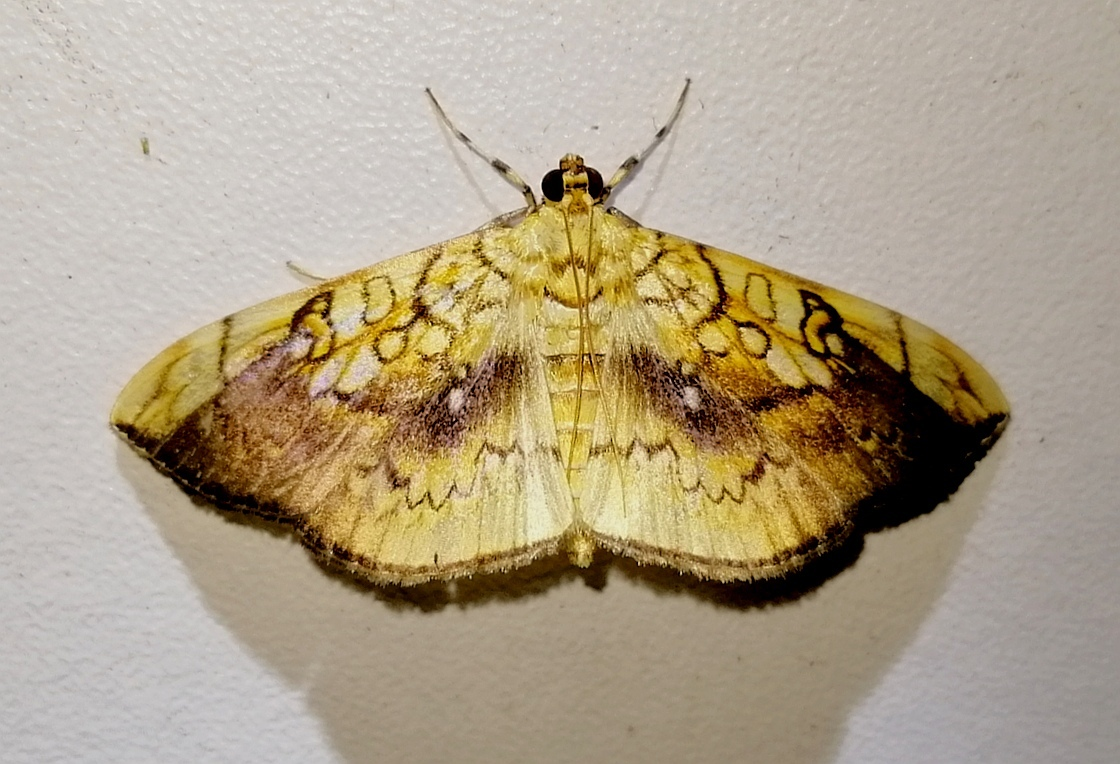

Scientific classification
- Domain: Eukaryota
- Kingdom: Animalia
- Phylum: Arthropoda
- Class: Insecta
- Order: Lepidoptera
- Family: Crambidae
- Genus: Pantographa
- Species: P. suffusalis

Binomial name
- Pantographa suffusalis H. Druce, 1895

= Pantographa suffusalis =

Species of moth

Pantographa suffusalis is a species of moth in the family Crambidae. It was described by Herbert Druce in 1895. It is found in Mexico and Costa Rica.

The forewings and hindwings are pale yellowish white, marked very much as in Pantographa scripturalis, but with the brown shading very pale.
