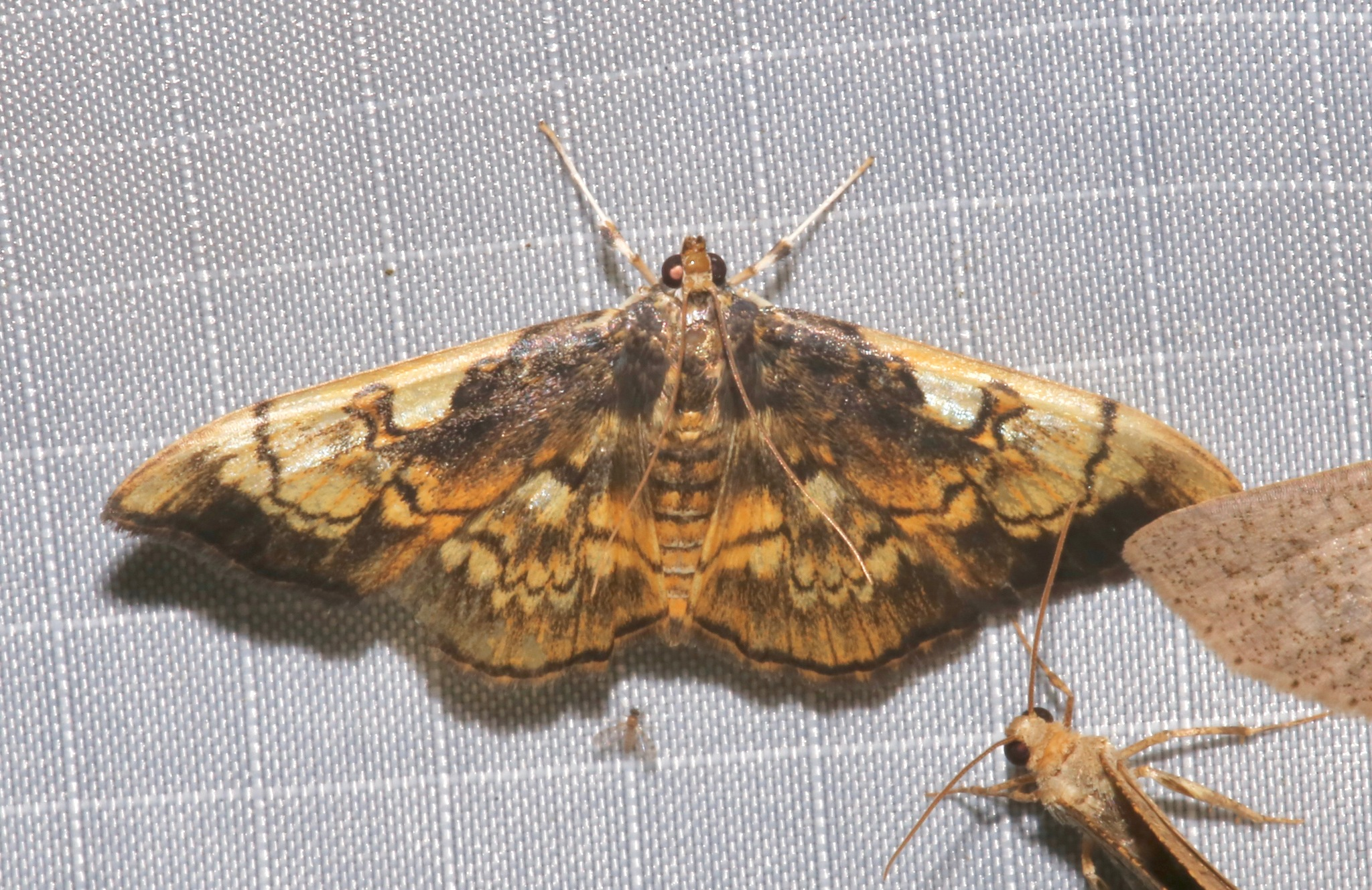

Scientific classification
- Kingdom: Animalia
- Phylum: Arthropoda
- Class: Insecta
- Order: Lepidoptera
- Family: Crambidae
- Genus: Pantographa
- Species: P. acoetesalis

Binomial name
- Pantographa acoetesalis (Walker, 1859)

Synonyms
- Pionea acoetesalis Walker, 1859; Pantographa cybelealis Druce, 1895

= Pantographa acoetesalis =

Species of moth

Pantographa acoetesalis is a moth in the family Crambidae. It was described by Francis Walker in 1859. It is found in Colombia, Ecuador, Panama, Belize and Costa Rica.
