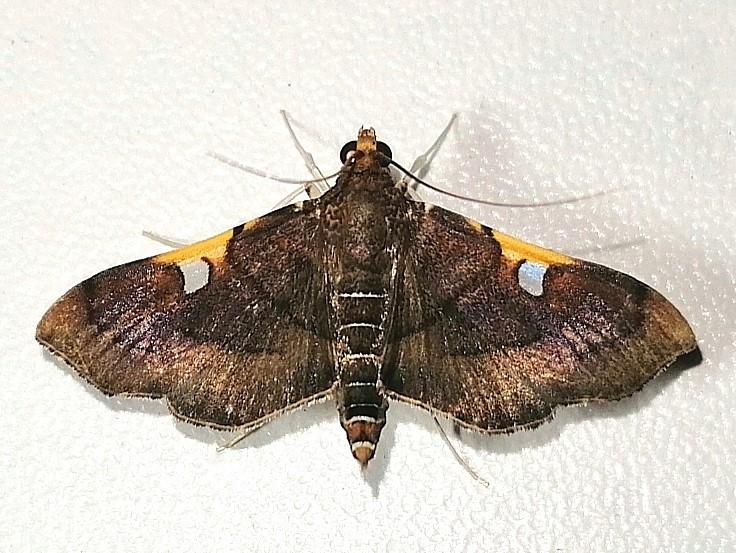

Scientific classification
- Kingdom: Animalia
- Phylum: Arthropoda
- Class: Insecta
- Order: Lepidoptera
- Family: Crambidae
- Genus: Coenostolopsis
- Species: C. terminalis

Binomial name
- Coenostolopsis terminalis Munroe, 1960

= Coenostolopsis terminalis =

Species of moth

Coenostolopsis terminalis is a species of moth in the family Crambidae. It was described by Eugene G. Munroe in 1960. It is found in Bolivia.
