= Tylostega luniformis =

Scientific classification
- Kingdom: Animalia
- Phylum: Arthropoda
- Clade: Pancrustacea
- Class: Insecta
- Order: Lepidoptera
- Family: Crambidae
- Genus: Tylostega
- Species: T. luniformis

Binomial name
- Tylostega luniformis Du & Li, 2008

Species of moth

Tylostega luniformis is a moth in the family Crambidae. It was described by Xi-Cui Du and Hou-Hun Li in 2008. It is found in Sichuan, China.
