= Tylostega photias =

Scientific classification
- Kingdom: Animalia
- Phylum: Arthropoda
- Clade: Pancrustacea
- Class: Insecta
- Order: Lepidoptera
- Family: Crambidae
- Genus: Tylostega
- Species: T. photias

Binomial name
- Tylostega photias Meyrick, 1894

Species of moth

Tylostega photias is a moth in the family Crambidae. It was described by Edward Meyrick in 1894. It is found on Borneo.

The wingspan is 20–21 mm. The forewings are fuscous, the inner margin suffused with ochreous towards the middle. There is a suffused pale ochreous streak along the costa. The lines are dark fuscous, forming blackish spots on the costa. There is a blackish discal mark and a blackish hindmarginal streak, including a series of whitish dots. The hindwings are whitish with a fuscous base. There is a broad, rather dark fuscous hindmarginal band, the anterior edge is suffused with ochreous. There is also a fuscous mark in the disc near and before this, as well as a hindmarginal series of connected white dots.
