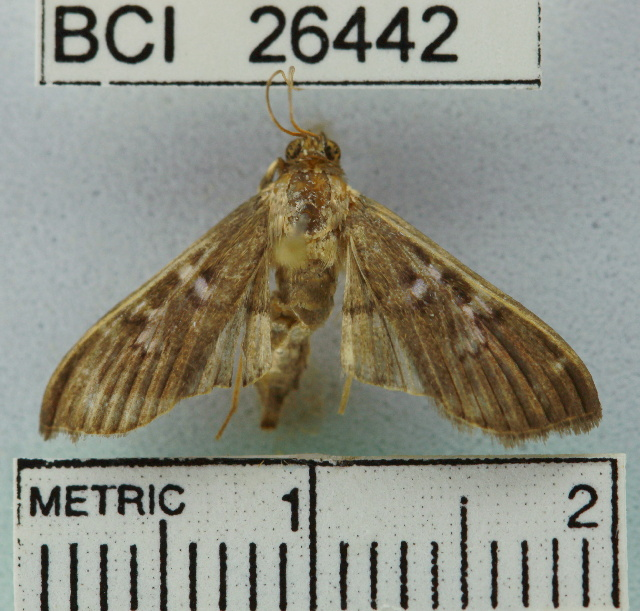

Scientific classification
- Kingdom: Animalia
- Phylum: Arthropoda
- Class: Insecta
- Order: Lepidoptera
- Family: Crambidae
- Genus: Microthyris
- Species: M. prolongalis

Binomial name
- Microthyris prolongalis (Guenée, 1854)

Synonyms
- Botys prolongalis Guenée, 1854; Botys agenoralis Walker, 1859; Botys eurytalis Walker, 1859; Botys sectalis Guenée, 1854; Botys scotalis Lederer, 1863

= Microthyris prolongalis =

Species of moth

Microthyris prolongalis is a moth in the family Crambidae. It was described by Achille Guenée in 1854. It is found in Brazil, the West Indies (Jamaica, the Dominican Republic, Puerto Rico, Cuba), Costa Rica, Panama, Belize, Honduras, Mexico, Texas and Florida.

The wingspan is about 33 mm. Adults are on wing in June, October and December in Florida.

The larvae have been recorded feeding on Ipomea species.
