= Goliathodes =

Scientific classification
- Kingdom: Animalia
- Phylum: Arthropoda
- Class: Insecta
- Order: Lepidoptera
- Family: Crambidae
- Tribe: Agroterini
- Genus: Goliathodes; Munroe, 1974
- Species: G. shafferi

Binomial name
- Goliathodes shafferi Munroe, 1974

Genus of moths

Goliathodes is a genus of moths of the family Crambidae. It contains only one species, Goliathodes shafferi, which is found in New Guinea.
