= Haritalodes levequei =

Scientific classification
- Kingdom: Animalia
- Phylum: Arthropoda
- Clade: Pancrustacea
- Class: Insecta
- Order: Lepidoptera
- Family: Crambidae
- Genus: Haritalodes
- Species: H. levequei

Binomial name
- Haritalodes levequei Leraut, 2005

Species of moth

Haritalodes levequei is a moth in the family Crambidae. It was described by Patrice J.A. Leraut in 2005. It is found in South Africa.
