= Tylostega =

Scientific classification
- Kingdom: Animalia
- Phylum: Arthropoda
- Class: Insecta
- Order: Lepidoptera
- Family: Crambidae
- Tribe: Agroterini
- Genus: Tylostega; Meyrick, 1894

Genus of moths

Tylostega is a genus of moths of the family Crambidae described by Edward Meyrick in 1894.

== Species ==
- Tylostega chrysanthes Meyrick, 1894
- Tylostega lata Du & Li, 2008
- Tylostega luniformis Du & Li, 2008
- Tylostega mesodora Meyrick, 1894
- Tylostega pectinata Du & Li, 2008
- Tylostega photias Meyrick, 1894
- Tylostega serrata Du & Li, 2008
- Tylostega tylostegalis (Hampson, 1900)
- Tylostega valvata Warren, 1896
