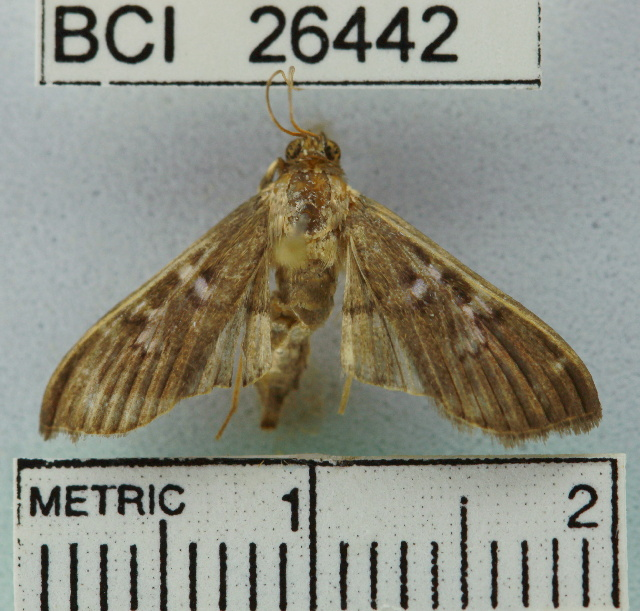
- Microthyris prolongalis

Scientific classification
- Kingdom: Animalia
- Phylum: Arthropoda
- Clade: Pancrustacea
- Class: Insecta
- Order: Lepidoptera
- Family: Crambidae
- Subfamily: Spilomelinae
- Tribe: Agroterini
- Genus: Microthyris; Lederer, 1863

Type species
- Botys prolongalis Guenée, 1854

Species
- See text

Synonyms
- Crossophora Möschler, 1890; Grossophora [lapsus]; Cyclocena Möschler, 1890

= Microthyris =

Genus of moths

Microthyris is a genus of pyraloid moths, belonging to the subfamily Spilomelinae of the grass moth family (Crambidae). The genus was first described by Julius Lederer in 1863.

== Species ==
The genus includes the following species:

- Microthyris alvinalis (Guenée, 1854)
- Microthyris anormalis (Guenée, 1854)
- Microthyris asadias (Druce, 1899)
- Microthyris lelex (Cramer, 1777)
- Microthyris microthyralis (Snellen, 1899)
- Microthyris miscellalis (Möschler, 1890)
- Microthyris prolongalis (Guenée, 1854)
