= Pantographa serratilinealis =

Scientific classification
- Domain: Eukaryota
- Kingdom: Animalia
- Phylum: Arthropoda
- Class: Insecta
- Order: Lepidoptera
- Family: Crambidae
- Genus: Pantographa
- Species: P. serratilinealis

Binomial name
- Pantographa serratilinealis (Lederer, 1863)

Synonyms
- Botys serratilinealis Lederer, 1863; Sylepta leucinalis Hampson, 1912

Species of moth

Pantographa serratilinealis is a moth in the family Crambidae. It was described by Julius Lederer in 1863. It is found in Venezuela and Peru.
