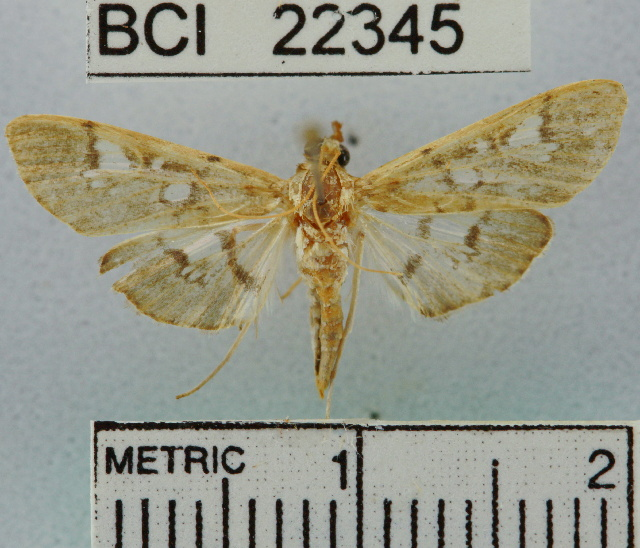

Scientific classification
- Kingdom: Animalia
- Phylum: Arthropoda
- Class: Insecta
- Order: Lepidoptera
- Family: Crambidae
- Genus: Microthyris
- Species: M. anormalis

Binomial name
- Microthyris anormalis (Guenée, 1854)

Synonyms
- Botys anormalis Guenée, 1854; Botys dracusalis Walker, 1859; Botys helcitalis Walker, 1859; Botys orphnealis Walker, 1859; Botys subaequalis Walker, 1866

= Microthyris anormalis =

Species of moth

Microthyris anormalis is a species of moth in the family Crambidae. It was described by Achille Guenée in 1854. It is found in French Guiana, Colombia, Ecuador, the Dominican Republic, Jamaica, Honduras, Panama, Costa Rica and the United States, where it has been recorded from Florida and Texas.

== Host plants ==
This species feeds on Convolvulaceae, in Cuba it was recorded on Ipomoea batatas and Turbina corymbosa.
