= Pantographa idmonalis =

Scientific classification
- Domain: Eukaryota
- Kingdom: Animalia
- Phylum: Arthropoda
- Class: Insecta
- Order: Lepidoptera
- Family: Crambidae
- Genus: Pantographa
- Species: P. idmonalis

Binomial name
- Pantographa idmonalis H. Druce, 1895

Species of moth

Pantographa idmonalis is a moth in the family Crambidae. It was described by Herbert Druce in 1895. It is found in Morelos, Mexico.

The forewings and hindwings are very pale yellowish fawn. The forewings are crossed by three narrow waved brown lines from the costal to the inner margin. There is a brown spot in the cell and a double brown spot at the end of it, as well as a zigzag submarginal curved pale line extending from the costal to the inner margin, and then continued across the hindwings to the anal angle. The hindwings are crossed by several indistinct lines.
