= Paranacoleia cuspidata =

Scientific classification
- Kingdom: Animalia
- Phylum: Arthropoda
- Clade: Pancrustacea
- Class: Insecta
- Order: Lepidoptera
- Family: Crambidae
- Genus: Paranacoleia
- Species: P. cuspidata

Binomial name
- Paranacoleia cuspidata Du & Li, 2008

Species of moth

Paranacoleia cuspidata is a moth in the family Crambidae. It was described by Xi-Cui Du and Hou-Hun Li in 2008. It is found in Fujian, China.
