= Aiyura (moth) =

Scientific classification
- Kingdom: Animalia
- Phylum: Arthropoda
- Clade: Pancrustacea
- Class: Insecta
- Order: Lepidoptera
- Family: Crambidae
- Tribe: Agroterini
- Genus: Aiyura; Munroe, 1974

Genus of moths

Aiyura is a genus of moths of the family Crambidae.

== Species ==
- Aiyura linoptera Munroe, 1974
- Aiyura pyrostrota (Hampson, 1912)
