= Chilochromopsis =

Scientific classification
- Kingdom: Animalia
- Phylum: Arthropoda
- Class: Insecta
- Order: Lepidoptera
- Family: Crambidae
- Tribe: Agroterini
- Genus: Chilochromopsis; Munroe, 1964
- Species: C. sceletogramma

Binomial name
- Chilochromopsis sceletogramma (Dyar, 1925)

Synonyms
- Sylepta sceletogramma Dyar, 1925

Genus of moths

Chilochromopsis is a genus of moths of the family Crambidae. It contains only one species, Chilochromopsis sceletogramma, which is found in Mexico, Costa Rica and Cuba.
