= Tylostega pectinata =

Scientific classification
- Kingdom: Animalia
- Phylum: Arthropoda
- Clade: Pancrustacea
- Class: Insecta
- Order: Lepidoptera
- Family: Crambidae
- Genus: Tylostega
- Species: T. pectinata

Binomial name
- Tylostega pectinata Du & Li, 2008

Species of moth

Tylostega pectinata is a moth in the family Crambidae. It was described by Xi-Cui Du and Hou-Hun Li in 2008. It is found in Shanxi, China.
