= Glaucobotys =

Scientific classification
- Kingdom: Animalia
- Phylum: Arthropoda
- Class: Insecta
- Order: Lepidoptera
- Family: Crambidae
- Tribe: Agroterini
- Genus: Glaucobotys; Maes, 2008
- Species: G. spiniformis

Binomial name
- Glaucobotys spiniformis Maes, 2008

Genus of moths

Glaucobotys is a genus of moths of the family Crambidae. It contains only one species, Glaucobotys spiniformis, which is found in Kenya.
