= Tylostega mesodora =

Scientific classification
- Kingdom: Animalia
- Phylum: Arthropoda
- Clade: Pancrustacea
- Class: Insecta
- Order: Lepidoptera
- Family: Crambidae
- Genus: Tylostega
- Species: T. mesodora

Binomial name
- Tylostega mesodora Meyrick, 1894

Species of moth

Tylostega mesodora is a moth in the family Crambidae. It was described by Edward Meyrick in 1894. It is found on Borneo.

The wingspan is about 19 mm. The forewings are fuscous, the inner margin is suffused with ochreous towards the middle. There is a suffused pale ochreous, orange tinged, streak along the costa. The lines are dark fuscous, forming blackish spots on the costa. There is a blackish discal mark and a slender orange hindmarginal streak, preceded by a series of blackish spots. The hindwings are marked as the forewings, but there is a broad ochreous-white antemedial band.
