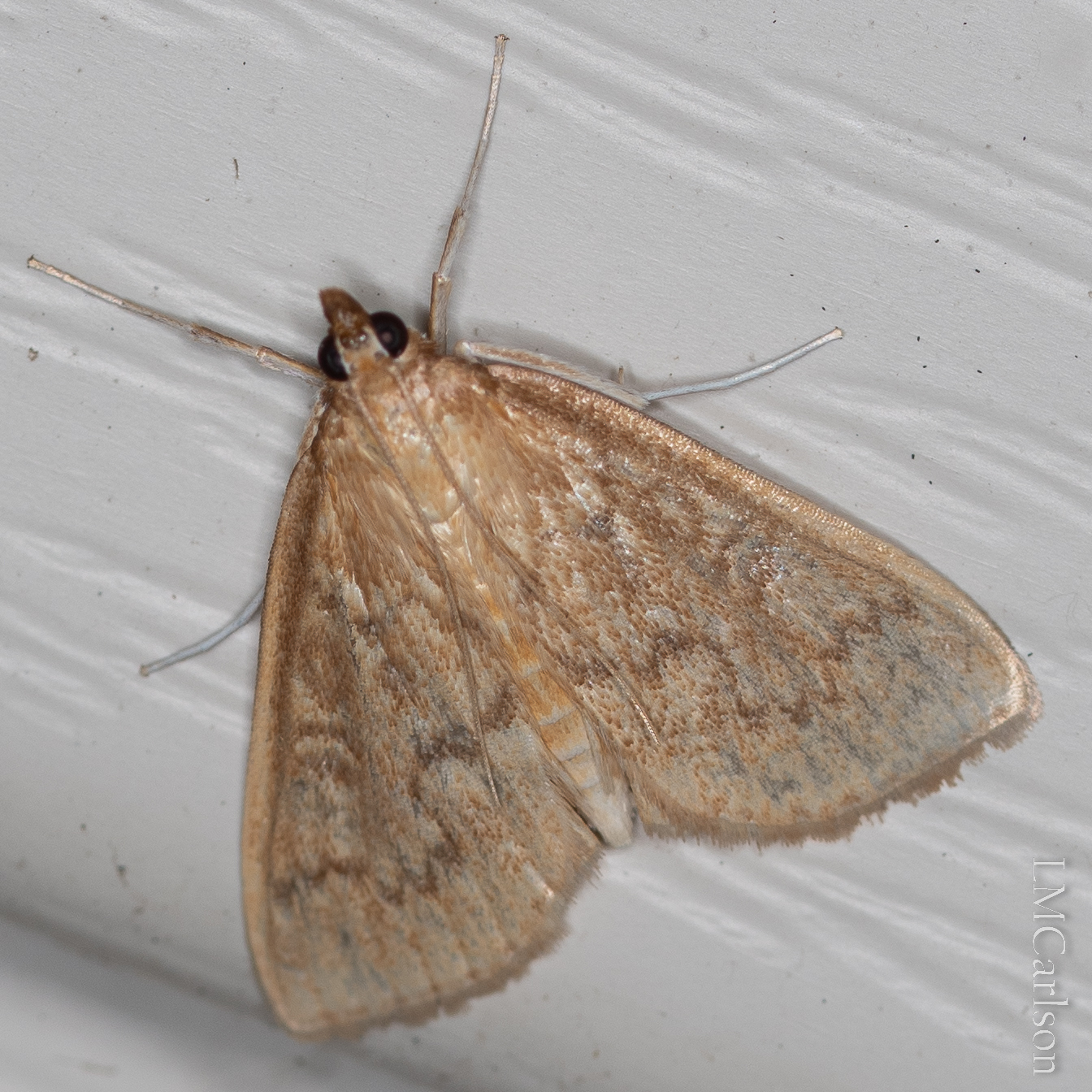

Scientific classification
- Kingdom: Animalia
- Phylum: Arthropoda
- Class: Insecta
- Order: Lepidoptera
- Family: Crambidae
- Tribe: Agroterini
- Genus: Framinghamia; Strand, 1920
- Species: F. helvalis

Binomial name
- Framinghamia helvalis (Walker, 1859)

Synonyms
- Pionea helvalis Walker, 1859; Framinghamia botys Strand, 1920; Botis oscitalis Grote, 1880; Botis gyralis Hulst, 1886

= Framinghamia =

Framinghamia helvalis

Genus of moths

Framinghamia is a genus of moths in the family Crambidae described by Embrik Strand in 1920. It is monotypic, being represented by the single species, Framinghamia helvalis. It was described by Francis Walker in 1859. It is found in North America, where it has been recorded from Alberta to New Brunswick, south to Utah, Texas and Florida. The type locality is Framingham, Massachusetts.
