= Pantographa gorgonalis =

Scientific classification
- Domain: Eukaryota
- Kingdom: Animalia
- Phylum: Arthropoda
- Class: Insecta
- Order: Lepidoptera
- Family: Crambidae
- Genus: Pantographa
- Species: P. gorgonalis

Binomial name
- Pantographa gorgonalis H. Druce, 1895

Species of moth

Pantographa gorgonalis is a moth in the family Crambidae. It was described by Herbert Druce in 1895. It is found in Guerrero, Mexico.

The forewings are yellowish fawn, crossed by three irregular bands of semihyaline pearly-white spots. The first near the base, the second about the middle and the third beyond the cell. These bands are edged with brown on the outer side. The hindwings are pearly hyaline white, the outer margin shaded with yellowish fawn. There is a spot at the end of the cell and a waved blackish-brown band below it crossing from the costal to the inner margin.
