= Aiyura pyrostrota =

Scientific classification
- Kingdom: Animalia
- Phylum: Arthropoda
- Clade: Pancrustacea
- Class: Insecta
- Order: Lepidoptera
- Family: Crambidae
- Genus: Aiyura
- Species: A. pyrostrota

Binomial name
- Aiyura pyrostrota (Hampson, 1912)

Synonyms
- Agrotera pyrostrota Hampson, 1912

Species of moth

Aiyura pyrostrota is a moth in the family Crambidae. It was described by George Hampson in 1912. It is found in Papua New Guinea.

The wingspan is about 36 mm. The forewings are bright yellow with slight fiery red irroration on the medial area. The costal area is suffused with fiery red up to middle. There is a slight fiery-red subbasal line and a diffused triangular patch of blackish and red suffusion beyond it from the costa to just below the cell. There is a small round fiery-red spot in the middle of the cell, as well as a blackish band suffused with silvery blue from the upper angle of the cell to the inner margin. There is some fiery-red suffusion below the costa in the fork of these bands, on the costal area towards the apex and beyond the band on the tornal area. There are also three slight fiery-red spots on the middle of the termen. The hindwings are semihyaline white, the terminal half tinged with yellow.
