= Neoanalthes contortalis =

Scientific classification
- Kingdom: Animalia
- Phylum: Arthropoda
- Clade: Pancrustacea
- Class: Insecta
- Order: Lepidoptera
- Family: Crambidae
- Genus: Neoanalthes
- Species: N. contortalis

Binomial name
- Neoanalthes contortalis (Hampson, 1900)

Synonyms
- Pilocrocis contortalis Hampson, 1900

Species of moth

Neoanalthes contortalis is a moth in the family Crambidae. It was described by George Hampson in 1900. It is found in Russian Far East (Amur, Ussuri), China and Korea.
