= Neoanalthes guangxiensis =

Scientific classification
- Kingdom: Animalia
- Phylum: Arthropoda
- Class: Insecta
- Order: Lepidoptera
- Family: Crambidae
- Genus: Neoanalthes
- Species: N. guangxiensis

Binomial name
- Neoanalthes guangxiensis Du & Li, 2008

Species of moth

Neoanalthes guangxiensis is a moth in the family Crambidae. It was described by Xi-Cui Du and Hou-Hun Li in 2008. It is found in Guangxi, China.
