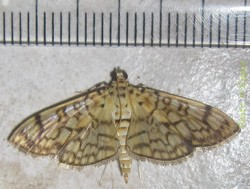

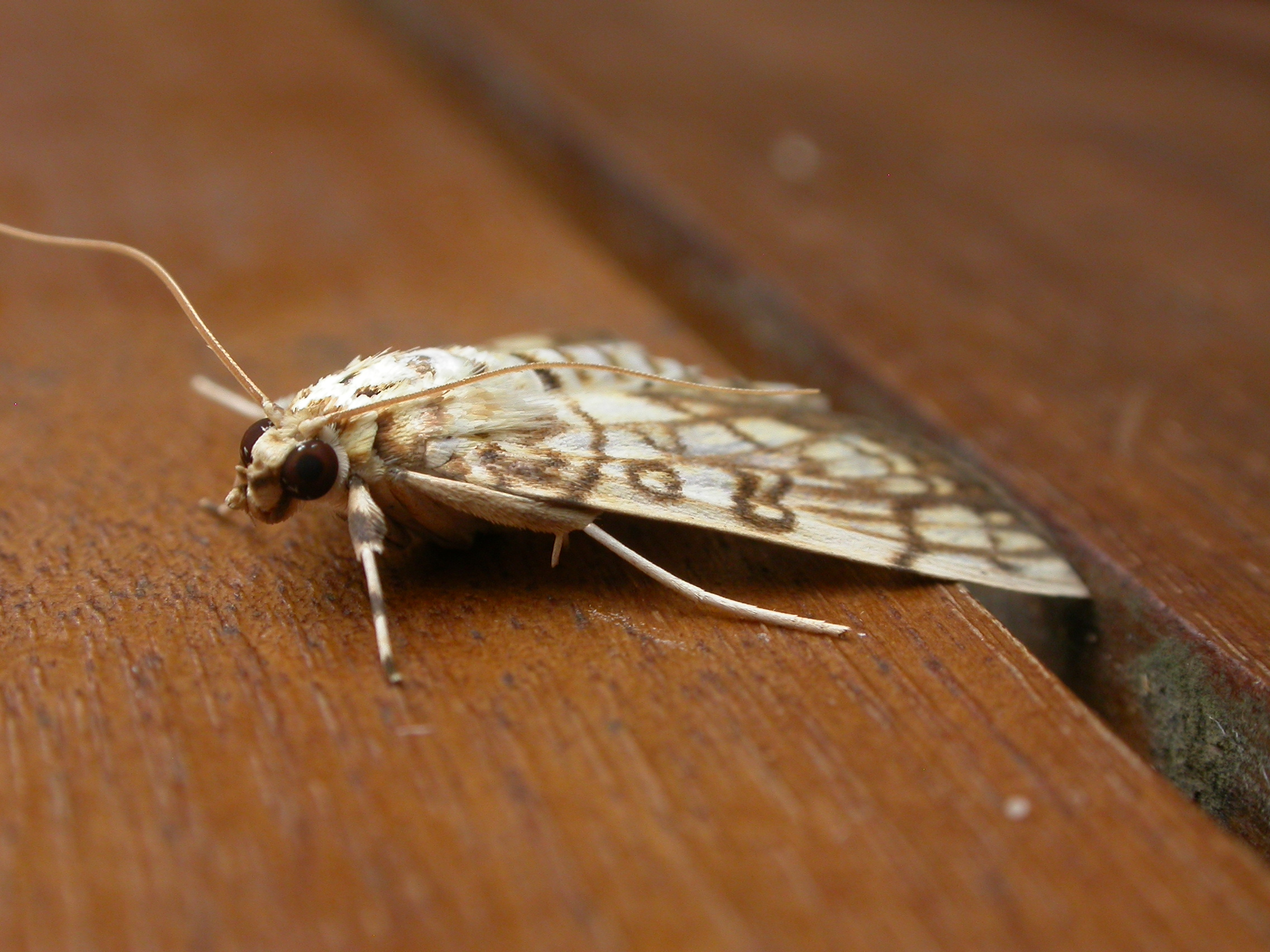

Scientific classification
- Kingdom: Animalia
- Phylum: Arthropoda
- Class: Insecta
- Order: Lepidoptera
- Family: Crambidae
- Genus: Haritalodes
- Species: H. derogata

Binomial name
- Haritalodes derogata (Fabricius, 1775)

Synonyms
- Phalaena derogata Fabricius, 1775; Botys multilinealis Guenée, 1854; Botys otysalis Walker, 1859; Zebronia salomealis Walker, 1859; Notarcha obliqualis T. P. Lucas, 1898; Haritalodes obliqualis; Botys annuligeralis Walker, 1866; Haritalodes annuligeralis; Botys basipunctalis Bremer, 1864; Haritalodes basipunctalis

= Haritalodes derogata =

Species of moth

Haritalodes derogata, the cotton leaf roller or okra leaf roller, is a species of moth of the family Crambidae. It was described by Johan Christian Fabricius in 1775. It is widely distributed. Records include the Comoros, the Democratic Republic of the Congo, Ghana, Mali, Réunion, Madagascar, the Seychelles, South Africa, the Gambia, Australia, Fiji, Papua New Guinea, Samoa, the Solomon Islands, the Andaman Islands, Bali, India, Sri Lanka, Malaysia, Myanmar, Singapore, Sri Lanka, Vietnam, China and Japan. It is sometimes encountered in Europe, due to accidental import.

The wingspan is 28–40 mm.

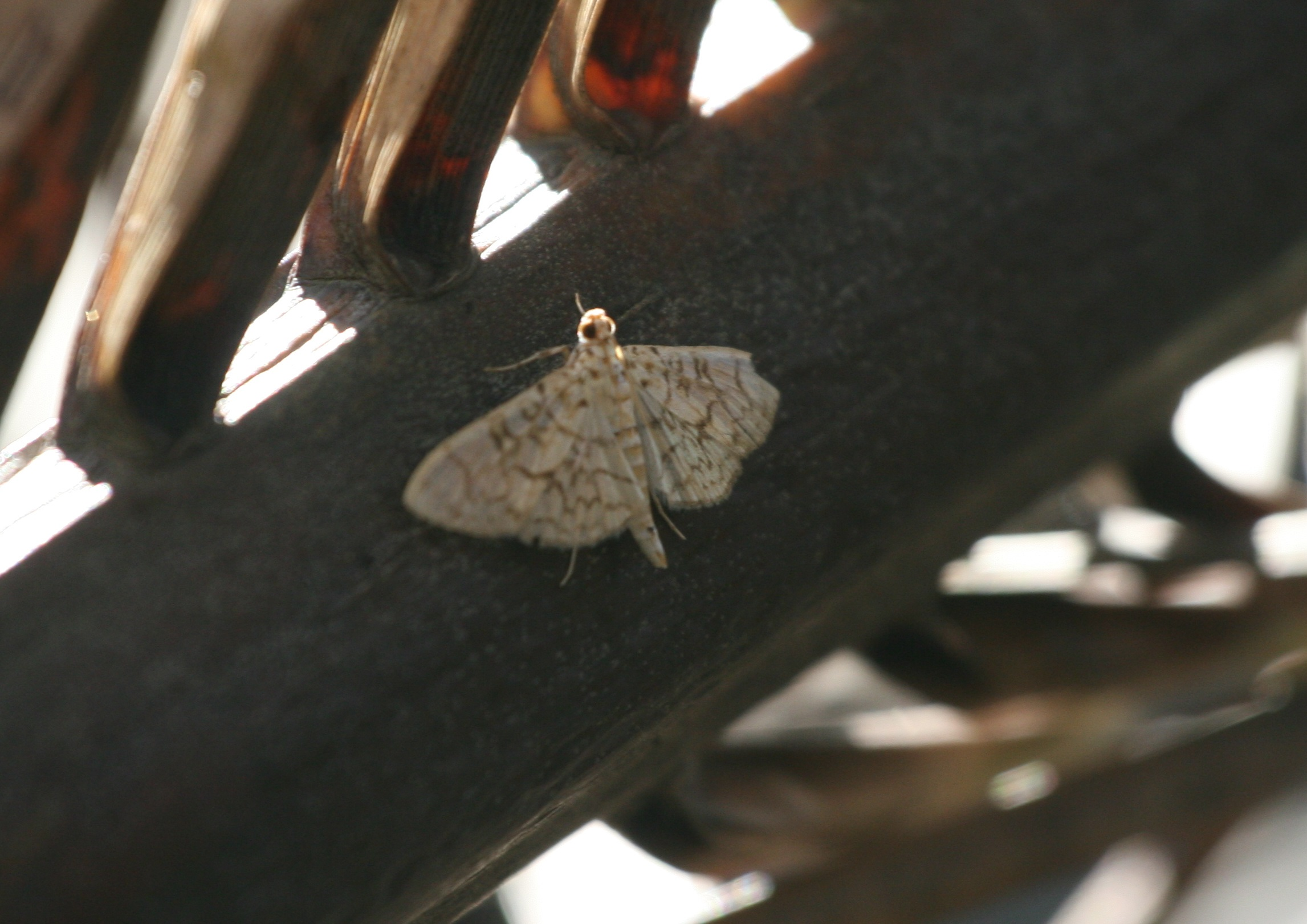
In Sri Lanka
