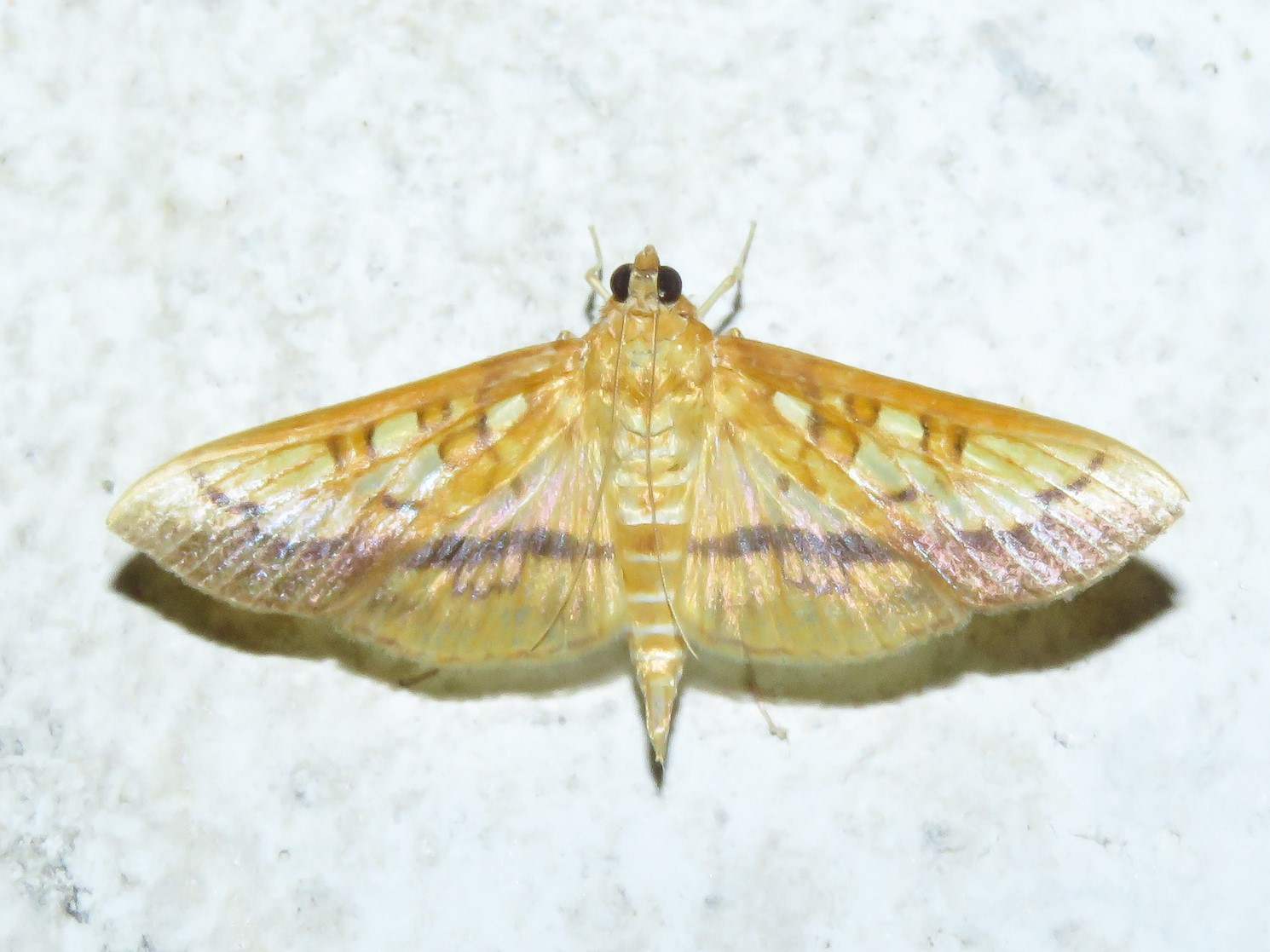

Scientific classification
- Kingdom: Animalia
- Phylum: Arthropoda
- Class: Insecta
- Order: Lepidoptera
- Family: Crambidae
- Tribe: Agroterini
- Genus: Micromartinia; Amsel, 1957
- Species: M. mnemusalis

Binomial name
- Micromartinia mnemusalis (Walker, 1859)

Synonyms
- (Genus): Martinia Amsel, 1956; (Species): Botys mnemusalis Walker, 1859; Botys caudalis C. Felder, R. Felder & Rogenhofer, 1875; Botys sanguiflualis Lederer, 1863

= Micromartinia =

Micromartinia mnemusalis

Genus of moths

Micromartinia is a genus of moths in the family Crambidae. It contains only one species, Micromartinia mnemusalis, which is found in Costa Rica, Brazil, French Guiana and Venezuela.
