= Microthyris miscellalis =

Scientific classification
- Kingdom: Animalia
- Phylum: Arthropoda
- Class: Insecta
- Order: Lepidoptera
- Family: Crambidae
- Genus: Microthyris
- Species: M. miscellalis

Binomial name
- Microthyris miscellalis (Möschler, 1890)

Synonyms
- Crossophora miscellalis Möschler, 1890

Species of moth

Microthyris miscellalis is a moth in the family Crambidae. It was described by Heinrich Benno Möschler in 1890. It is found in Puerto Rico.
