= Aiyura linoptera =

Scientific classification
- Kingdom: Animalia
- Phylum: Arthropoda
- Clade: Pancrustacea
- Class: Insecta
- Order: Lepidoptera
- Family: Crambidae
- Genus: Aiyura
- Species: A. linoptera

Binomial name
- Aiyura linoptera Munroe, 1974

Species of moth

Aiyura linoptera is a moth in the family Crambidae. It was described by Eugene G. Munroe in 1974. It is found on New Guinea.
