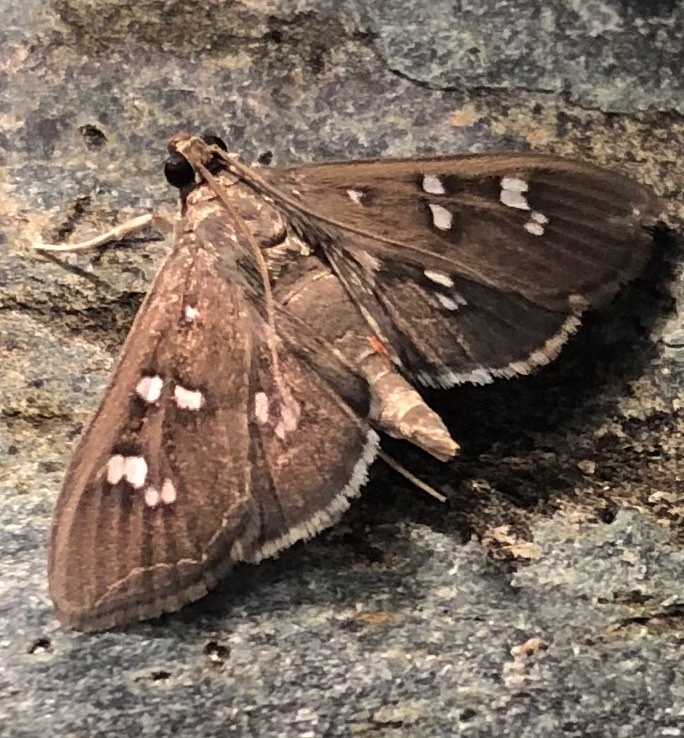

Scientific classification
- Kingdom: Animalia
- Phylum: Arthropoda
- Class: Insecta
- Order: Lepidoptera
- Family: Crambidae
- Genus: Microthyris
- Species: M. alvinalis

Binomial name
- Microthyris alvinalis (Guenée, 1854)

Synonyms
- Botys alvinalis Guenée, 1854

= Microthyris alvinalis =

Species of moth in the family Crambidae

Microthyris alvinalis is a species of moth in the family Crambidae. It was described by Achille Guenée in 1854. It has been reported from Brazil and Costa Rica.
