= Coenostolopsis apicalis =

Scientific classification
- Kingdom: Animalia
- Phylum: Arthropoda
- Class: Insecta
- Order: Lepidoptera
- Family: Crambidae
- Genus: Coenostolopsis
- Species: C. apicalis

Binomial name
- Coenostolopsis apicalis (Lederer, 1863)

Synonyms
- Coenostola apicalis Lederer, 1863

Species of moth

Coenostolopsis apicalis is a species of moth in the family Crambidae. It was described by Julius Lederer in 1863. It is found in Brazil.
