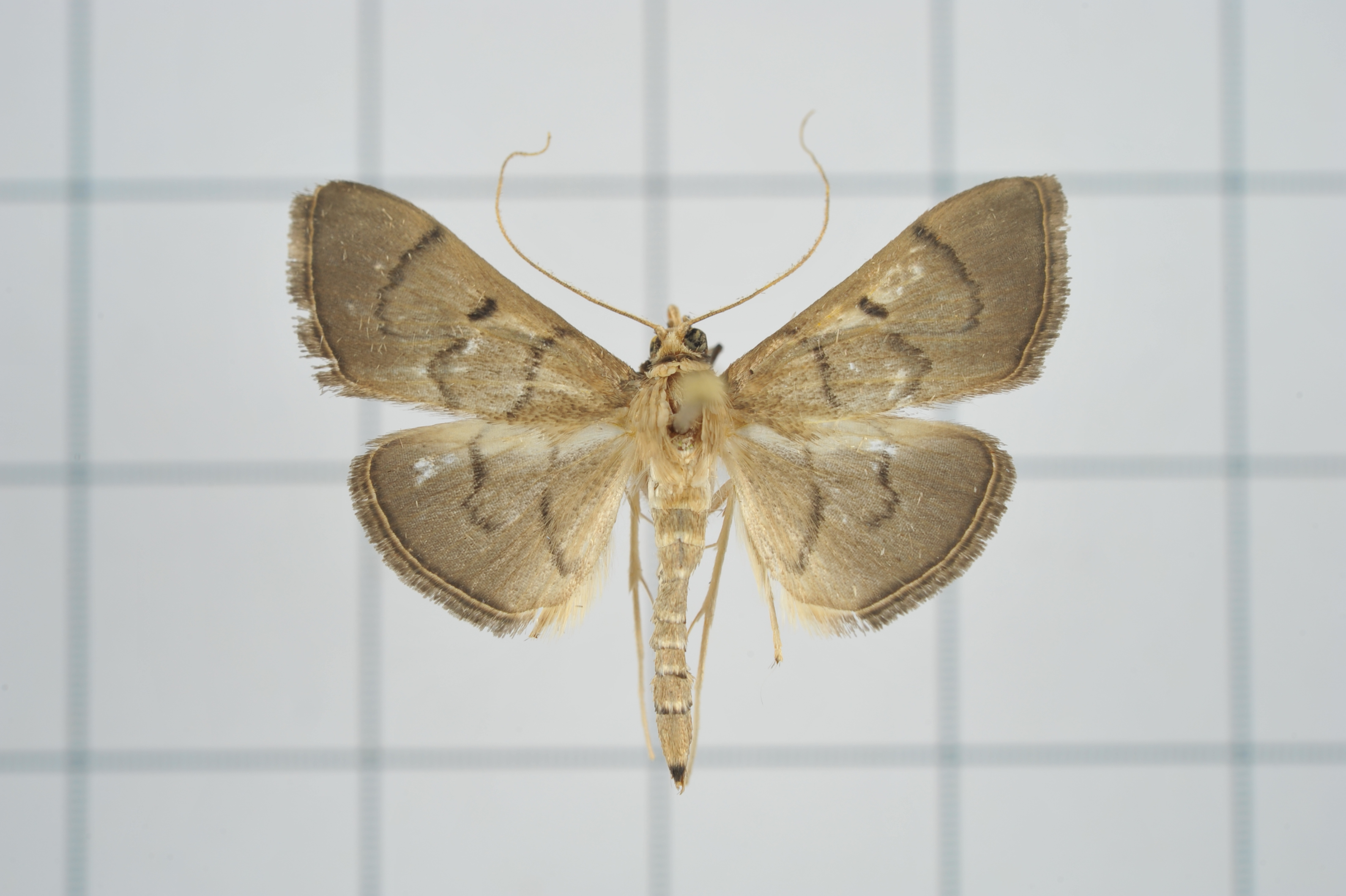
- Paranacoleia lophophoralis

Scientific classification
- Kingdom: Animalia
- Phylum: Arthropoda
- Class: Insecta
- Order: Lepidoptera
- Family: Crambidae
- Subfamily: Spilomelinae
- Tribe: Agroterini
- Genus: Paranacoleia; Inoue, 1982

= Paranacoleia =

Genus of moths

Paranacoleia is a genus of moths of the family Crambidae.

== Species ==
- Paranacoleia cuspidata Du & Li, 2008
- Paranacoleia elegantula Du & Li, 2008
- Paranacoleia lophophoralis (Hampson, 1912)
- Paranacoleia lubrica Du & Li, 2008
