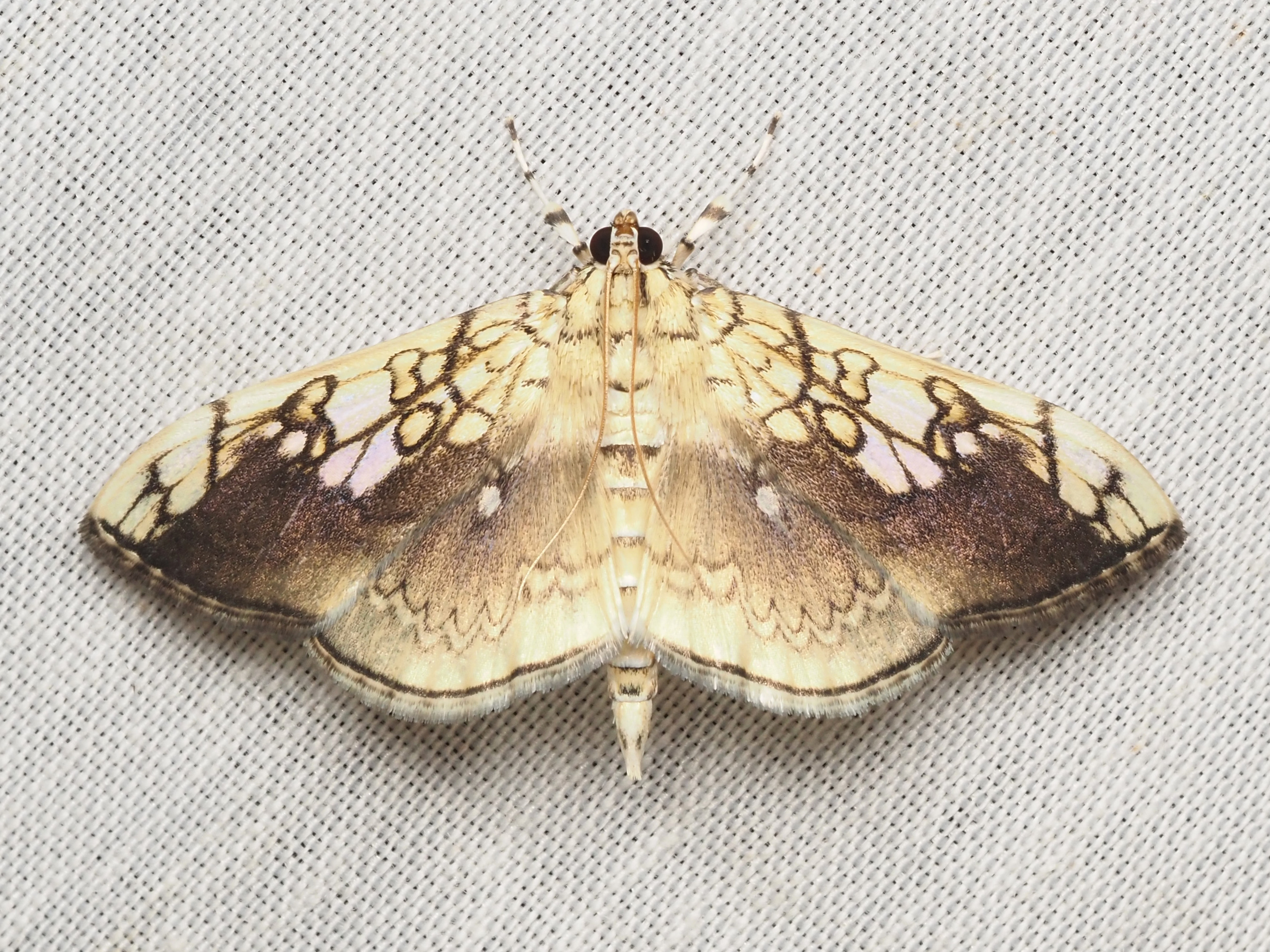

Scientific classification
- Kingdom: Animalia
- Phylum: Arthropoda
- Class: Insecta
- Order: Lepidoptera
- Family: Crambidae
- Genus: Pantographa
- Species: P. limata

Binomial name
- Pantographa limata (Grote & Robinson, 1867)

Synonyms
- Sylepta limata Grote & Robinson, 1867

= Pantographa limata =

Species of moth

Pantographa limata, the basswood leafroller moth, is a moth of the family Crambidae. It is found in North America, including Arkansas, Florida, Georgia, Illinois, Massachusetts, New Hampshire, New York, North Carolina, Ohio, [Indiana] Pennsylvania, Tennessee, Virginia, West Virginia, Wisconsin and Quebec.

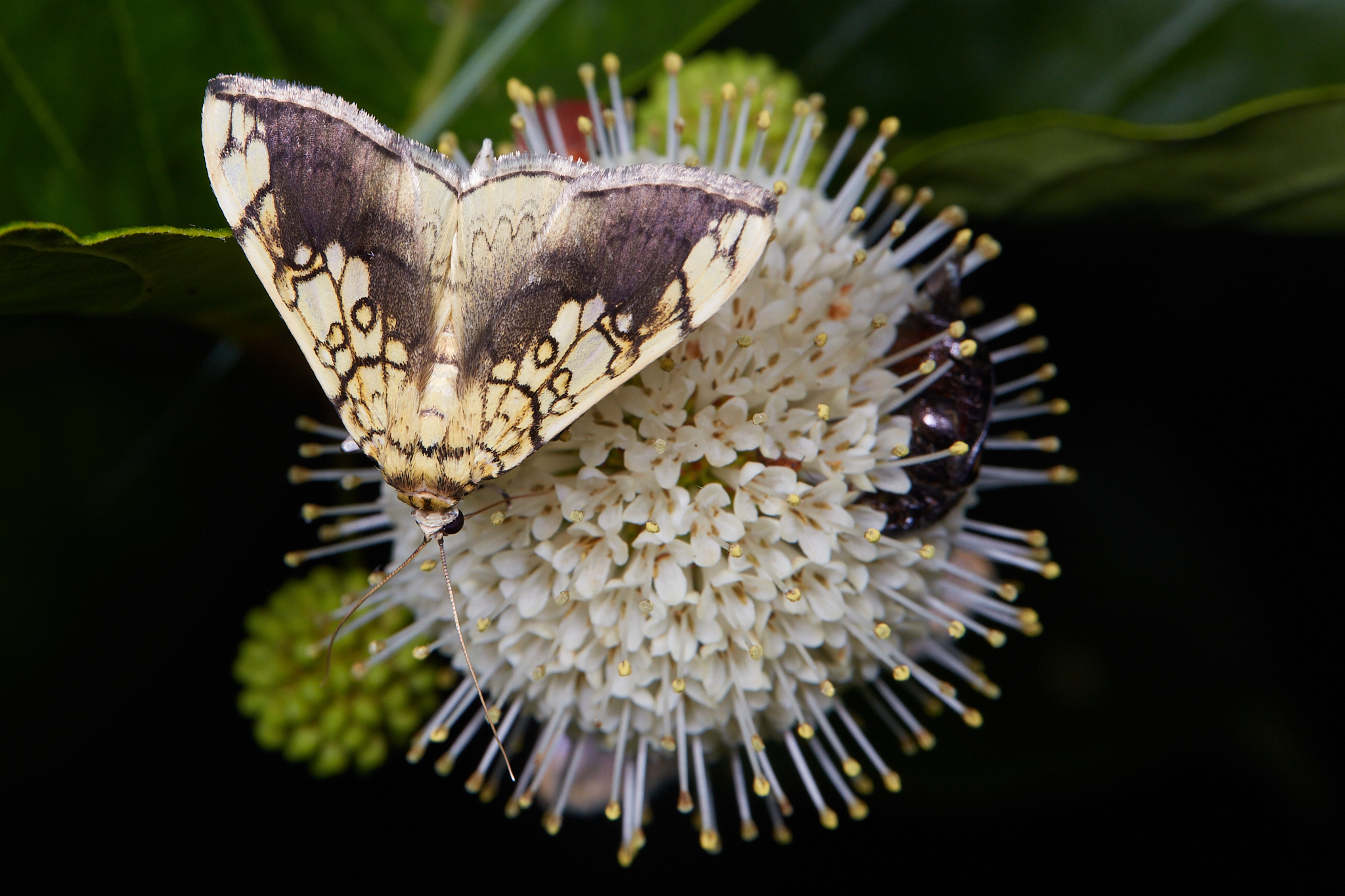
On a buttonbush. In New Hampshire

The wingspan is about 38 mm.

The larvae feed on Tilia species. They roll the leaves of their host plant.

The moth eats basswood, oak and rock elm.
