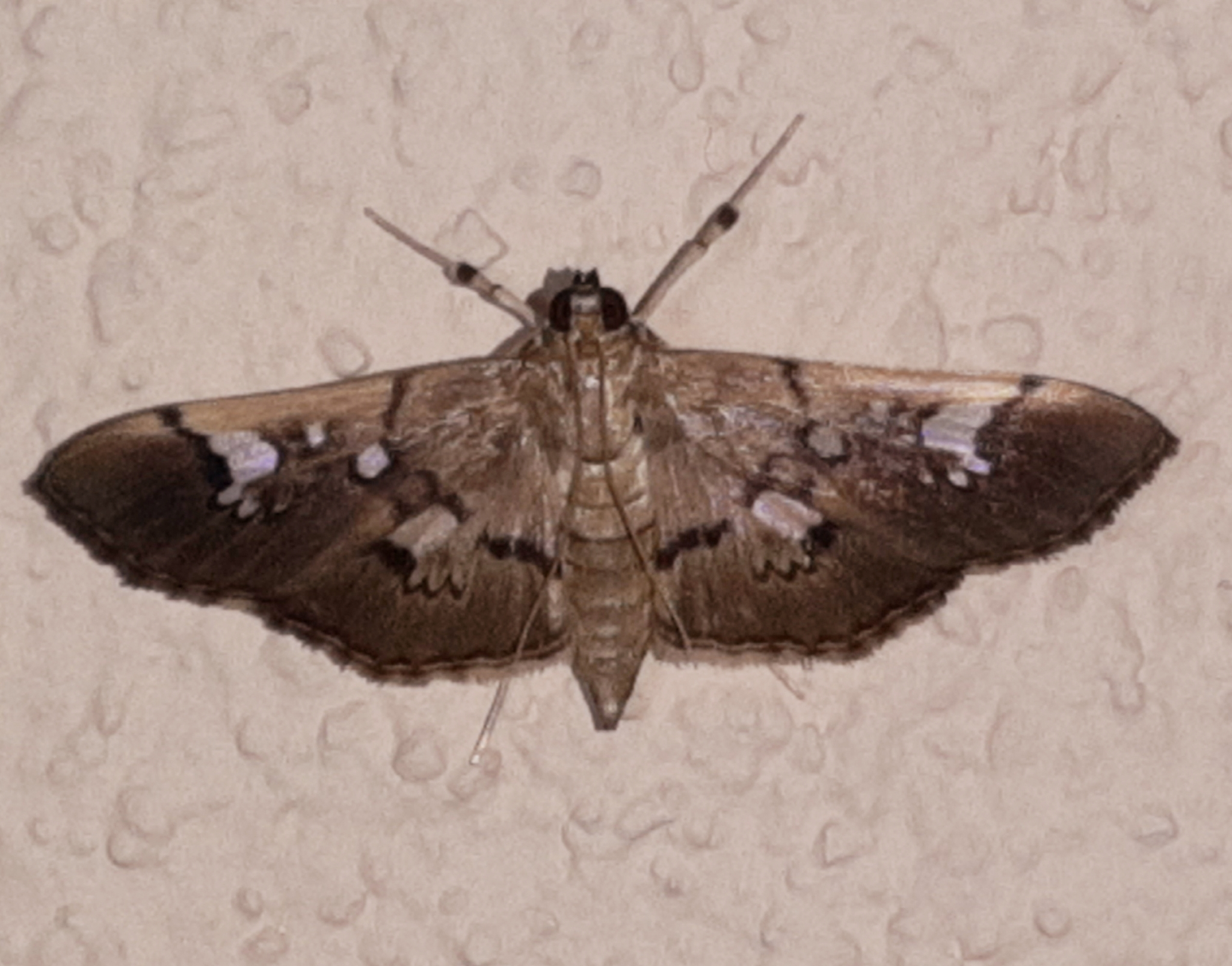

Scientific classification
- Kingdom: Animalia
- Phylum: Arthropoda
- Class: Insecta
- Order: Lepidoptera
- Family: Crambidae
- Genus: Microthyris
- Species: M. asadias

Binomial name
- Microthyris asadias (H. Druce, 1899)

Synonyms
- Samea asadias H. Druce, 1899

= Microthyris asadias =

Species of moth

Microthyris asadias is a species of moth in the family Crambidae. It was described by Herbert Druce in 1899. It is found in Guatemala and Costa Rica.
