= Tylostega tylostegalis =

Scientific classification
- Kingdom: Animalia
- Phylum: Arthropoda
- Clade: Pancrustacea
- Class: Insecta
- Order: Lepidoptera
- Family: Crambidae
- Genus: Tylostega
- Species: T. tylostegalis

Binomial name
- Tylostega tylostegalis (Hampson, 1900)

Synonyms
- Entephria tylostegalis Hampson, 1900

Species of moth

Tylostega tylostegalis is a moth in the family Crambidae. It was described by George Hampson in 1900. It is found in the Russian Far East (Amur, Ussuri) and western China.

The wingspan is about 24 mm. The forewings have black marks at the base and a sub-basal fuscous band from below the costa to the inner margin. There is a curved antemedial band, as well as some dark marks round the fovea. The postmedial line is curved from the costa to vein 5, then outwardly oblique to vein 2 on which it is retracted to the lower angle of cell, with a broad area of fuscous suffusion on its inner side, below the cell conjoined to suffusion beyond the antemedial band. The terminal area has patches of fuscous from below the costa to vein 3 and from the angle of the postmedial line to the tornus. There is a terminal series of black points. The hindwings have a paler basal area and a sub-basal fuscous mark on the inner area. There is a discoidal point and conjoined postmedial and subterminal fuscous maculate patches from vein 6 to the inner margin at the middle and tornus. There is a subterminal patch from costa to vein 3 and a terminal series of black points.
