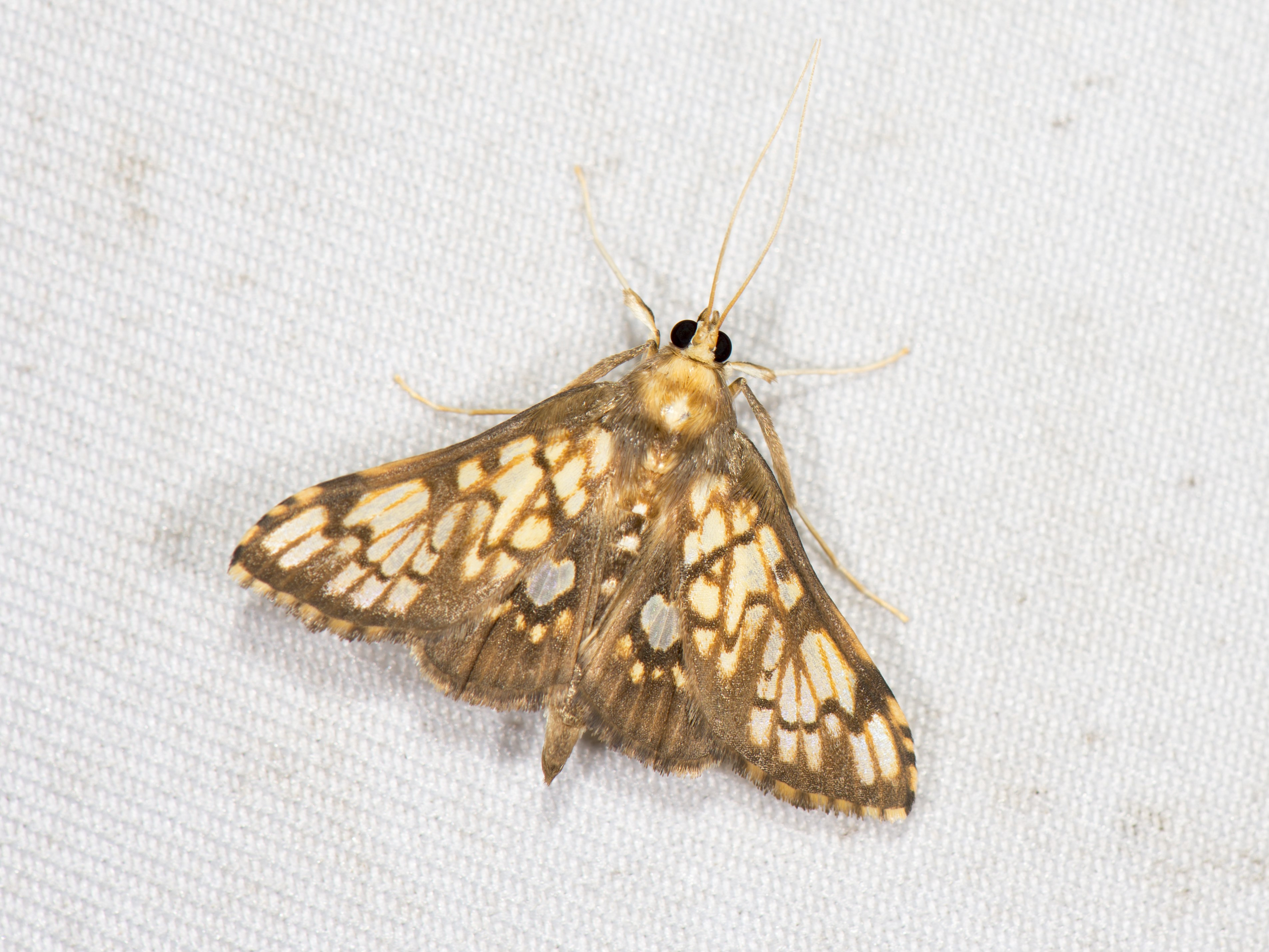

Scientific classification
- Kingdom: Animalia
- Phylum: Arthropoda
- Class: Insecta
- Order: Lepidoptera
- Family: Crambidae
- Genus: Neoanalthes
- Species: N. nebulalis

Binomial name
- Neoanalthes nebulalis Yamanaka & Kirpichnikova, 1993

= Neoanalthes nebulalis =

Species of moth

Neoanalthes nebulalis is a moth in the family Crambidae. It was described by Hiroshi Yamanaka and Valentina A. Kirpichnikova in 1993 and is found in Taiwan.
