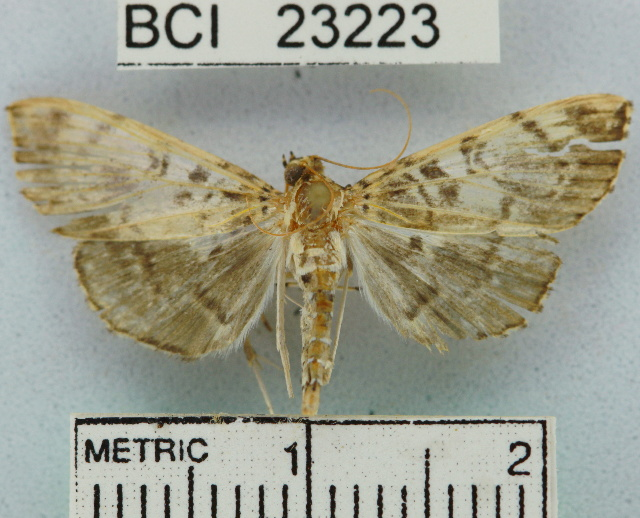

Scientific classification
- Domain: Eukaryota
- Kingdom: Animalia
- Phylum: Arthropoda
- Class: Insecta
- Order: Lepidoptera
- Family: Crambidae
- Genus: Pantographa
- Species: P. expansalis

Binomial name
- Pantographa expansalis (Lederer, 1863)

Synonyms
- Botys expansalis Lederer, 1863; Pantographa orsonalis H. Druce, 1895

= Pantographa expansalis =

Species of moth

Pantographa expansalis is a moth in the family Crambidae. It was described by Julius Lederer in 1863. It is found in Costa Rica and Panama.
