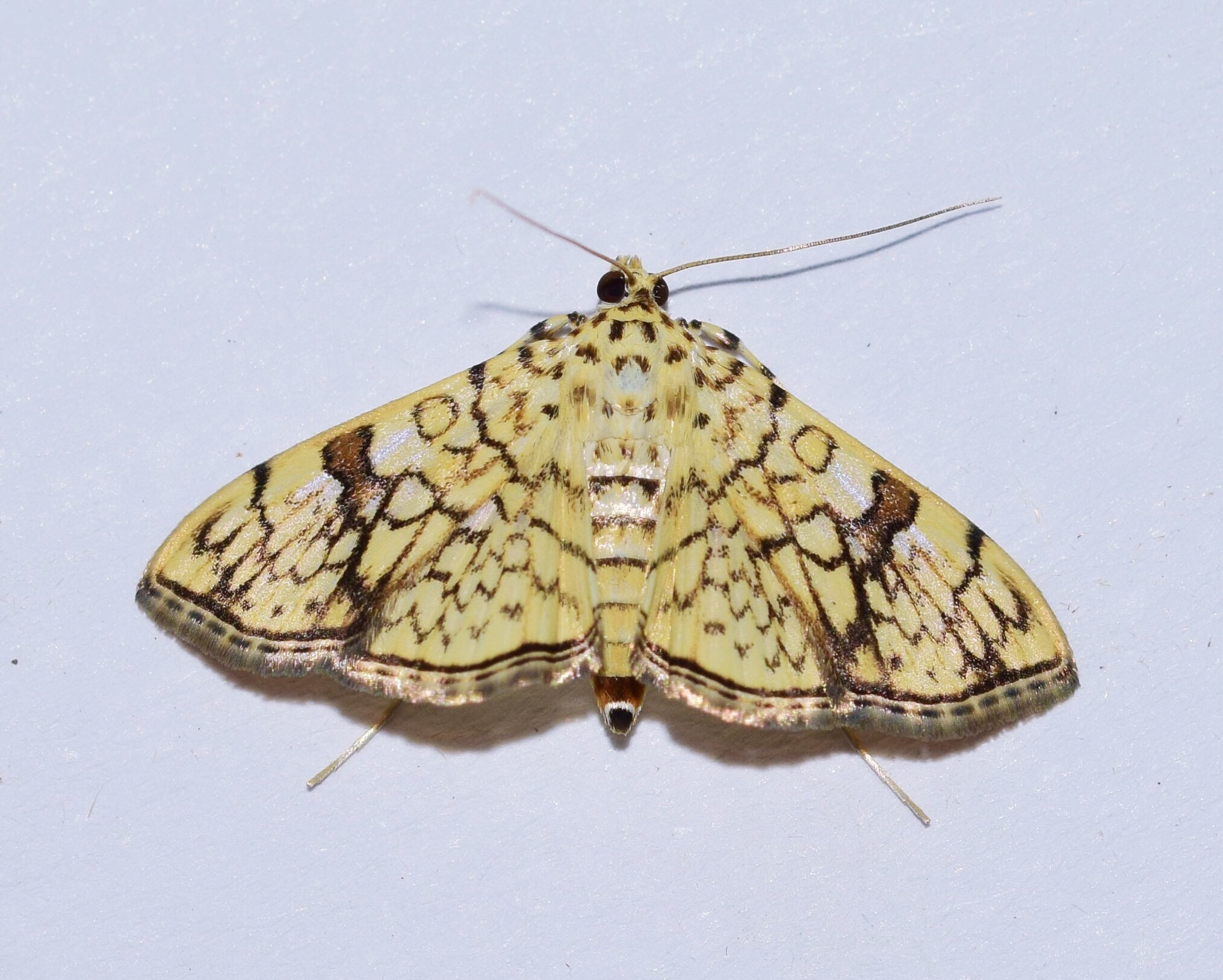

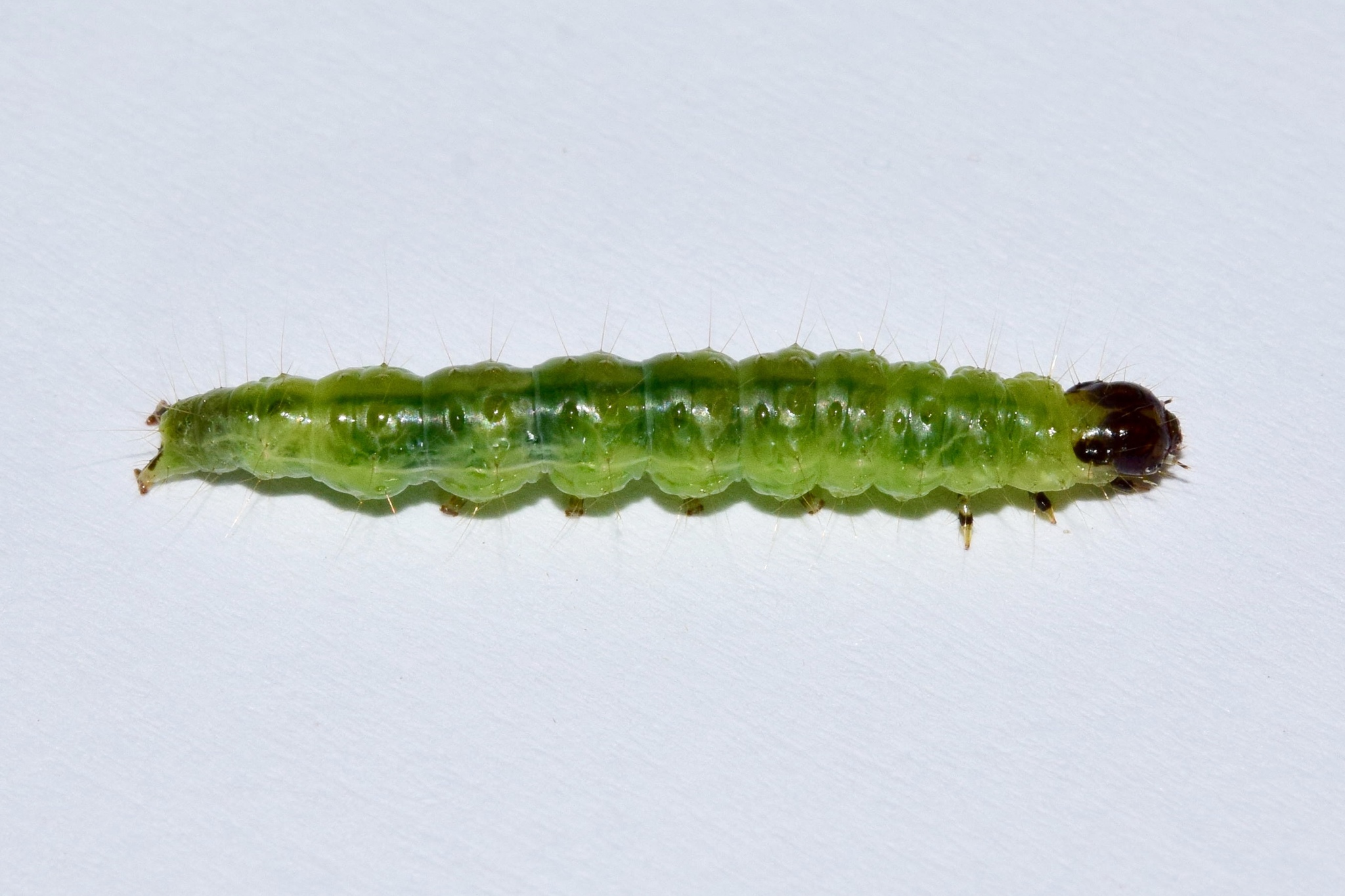
- Adult (top) and larva (bottom)

Scientific classification
- Kingdom: Animalia
- Phylum: Arthropoda
- Class: Insecta
- Order: Lepidoptera
- Family: Crambidae
- Genus: Haritalodes
- Species: H. polycymalis

Binomial name
- Haritalodes polycymalis (Hampson, 1912)

Synonyms
- Sylepta polycymalis Hampson, 1912

= Haritalodes polycymalis =

Species of moth

Haritalodes polycymalis is a species of moth in the family Crambidae. It was described by George Hampson in 1912. It is found in sub-Saharan Africa from Sierra Leone to South Africa.

== Description ==
The wingspan is about 26 mm. The forewings are pale yellow with two black points on the base of the costal area followed by a curved line, then a series of black points. There is an oblique slightly waved antemedial line, followed by a brown annulus from the costa to the median nervure and another below the cell. There is a brown bar from the costa to the lower angle of the cell and a waved postmedial line bent outwards between veins 6 and 2, then retracted to below the angle of the cell and oblique to the inner margin and with a waved line across its sinus between veins 6 and 2, and an oblique bar from it at vein 2 to the tornus. There is also a waved subterminal line from the costa to vein 5 connected with the termen by a brown patch between veins 6 and 5. There are some subterminal points on the inner half and a strong blackish terminal line. The hindwings are pale yellow with a rather diffused sinuous subbasal line from the subcostal nervure to the inner margin, an oblique discoidal bar and oblique line from the lower angle of the cell to the tornus, as well as a waved postmedial line bent outwards between veins 5 and 2, then oblique to above tornus, with an irregularly waved line on its inner side from the costa to vein 2. The subterminal line is waved from the costa to vein 2 and there is a strong blackish terminal line expanding into a slight patch at the apex.

== Distribution and habitat ==
It is found in the Democratic Republic of the Congo (Equateur, East Kasai), Guinea, Ivory Coast, Kenya, Madagascar, Malawi, Mozambique, Sierra Leone, South Africa (KwaZulu-Natal), Tanzania and Uganda.

== Behaviour and ecology ==
The larvae feed on Cola diversifolia, Cola nitida, Cola acuminata and Dombeya species.
