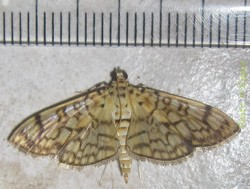
- Haritalodes_derogata

Scientific classification
- Kingdom: Animalia
- Phylum: Arthropoda
- Class: Insecta
- Order: Lepidoptera
- Family: Crambidae
- Tribe: Agroterini
- Genus: Haritalodes; Warren, 1890

= Haritalodes =

Genus of moths

Haritalodes is a genus of moths in the family Crambidae. The former genus Bocchoropsis Amsel, 1956 has been synonymised with it. It currently comprises 13 species.

== Species ==
- Haritalodes adjunctalis Leraut, 2005
- Haritalodes amboinensis Leraut, 2005
- Haritalodes angustalis Yamanaka, 2009
- Haritalodes annuligeralis (Walker, 1866)
- Haritalodes barbuti Leraut, 2005
- Haritalodes basipunctalis (Bremer, 1864)
- Haritalodes derogata (Fabricius, 1775)
- Haritalodes kosralis Ko in Ko, Albert & Bayarsaikhan, 2023
- Haritalodes levequei Leraut, 2005
- Haritalodes mineti Leraut, 2005
- Haritalodes pharaxalis (Druce, 1895)
- Haritalodes polycymalis (Hampson, 1912)
- Haritalodes pseudoderogata (Strand, 1920)
