= Paranacoleia lubrica =

Scientific classification
- Kingdom: Animalia
- Phylum: Arthropoda
- Clade: Pancrustacea
- Class: Insecta
- Order: Lepidoptera
- Family: Crambidae
- Genus: Paranacoleia
- Species: P. lubrica

Binomial name
- Paranacoleia lubrica Du, Li & Tron 2008

Species of moth

Paranacoleia lubrica is a moth in the family Crambidae. It was first described by Xi-Cui Du, Hou-Hun Li and Tron Praks in 2008, based on specimens collected in Fujian, China.

== Description ==
Upperside: Antennae filiform. Body is generally subdued in color and covered with fine scales on the head and thorax. Forewings long and finely scaled with a pale brown to ochreous ground color with darker markings and transverse patterning. The hindwings are relatively lighter, delicately marked with transverse lines and a subdued margin. Wings held roof-like when at rest, characteristic of the small crambid moths of the subfamily spilomelinae

Underside: Palpi is slender and scaled. Legs rather thin and covered in light-colored scales. The underside of the wings are paler than the upper side, retaining the major transverse markings as the upper side but less with less contrast. Membranous wings with entire and finely fringed margins.

The species is a small moth distinguished from closely related paranacoleia species by details of its wing pattern and particularly the structure of the genitalia.
