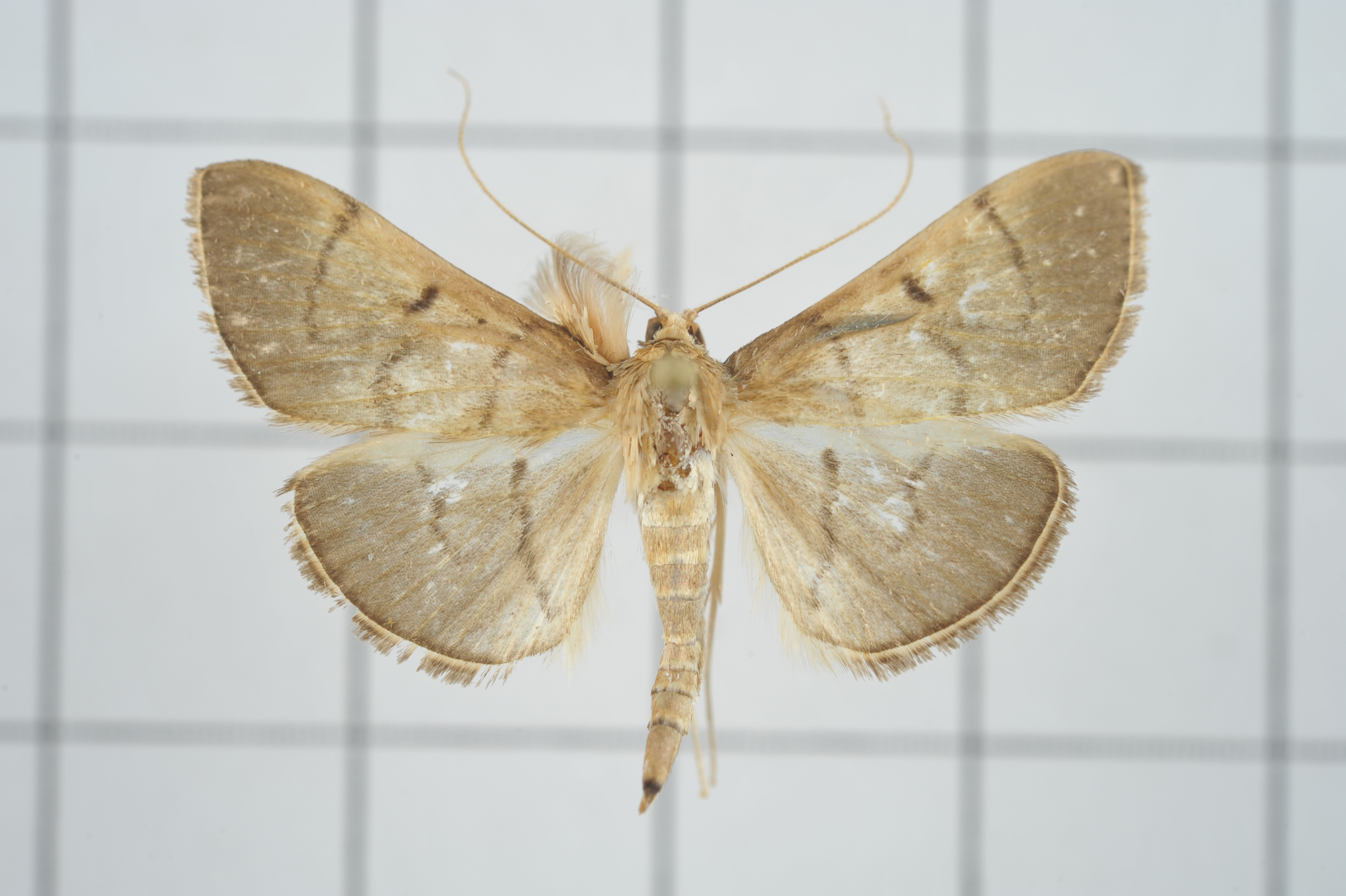

Scientific classification
- Kingdom: Animalia
- Phylum: Arthropoda
- Clade: Pancrustacea
- Class: Insecta
- Order: Lepidoptera
- Family: Crambidae
- Genus: Paranacoleia
- Species: P. lophophoralis

Binomial name
- Paranacoleia lophophoralis (Hampson, 1912)

Synonyms
- Nacoleia lophophoralis Hampson, 1912; Nacoleia lophophoralis Wileman, 1911

= Paranacoleia lophophoralis =

Species of moth

Paranacoleia lophophoralis is a species of moth in the family Crambidae. It was described by George Hampson in 1912. It is found in Japan, Taiwan and China.
