= Haritalodes angustalis =

Scientific classification
- Kingdom: Animalia
- Phylum: Arthropoda
- Class: Insecta
- Order: Lepidoptera
- Family: Crambidae
- Genus: Haritalodes
- Species: H. angustalis

Binomial name
- Haritalodes angustalis Yamanaka, 2009

Species of moth

Haritalodes angustalis is a moth in the family Crambidae. It was described by Hiroshi Yamanaka in 2009. It is found in Kyushu, Japan.
