= Tylostega valvata =

Scientific classification
- Kingdom: Animalia
- Phylum: Arthropoda
- Clade: Pancrustacea
- Class: Insecta
- Order: Lepidoptera
- Family: Crambidae
- Genus: Tylostega
- Species: T. valvata

Binomial name
- Tylostega valvata Warren, 1896

Species of moth

Tylostega valvata is a moth in the family Crambidae. It was described by William Warren in 1896. It is found in the Khasi Hills of India.

The wingspan is about 24 mm. The forewings are yellow ochreous, almost wholly suffused with the base of the fringes alone remaining of the pale ground colour. The basal and marginal areas are still darker than the central area. There is a patch of scales on the cell, which is edged with blackish, and the origin of the first line on the costa above the beginning of the patch is also blackish, but its lower course is lost in the dark suffusion. There is a second line at two thirds, curved in its upper third, interrupted in the middle, and vertical to two thirds of the inner margin in its lower third. There is a marginal dark space with a concise straight oblique edge internally, with a curved row of smoky and blackish fuscous. The hindwings are straw coloured.
