= Pantographa prorogata =

Scientific classification
- Kingdom: Animalia
- Phylum: Arthropoda
- Class: Insecta
- Order: Lepidoptera
- Family: Crambidae
- Genus: Pantographa
- Species: P. prorogata

Binomial name
- Pantographa prorogata (Hampson, 1912)

Synonyms
- Sylepta prorogata Hampson, 1912

Species of moth

Pantographa prorogata is a moth in the family Crambidae. It was described by George Hampson in 1912. It is found in Suriname.
