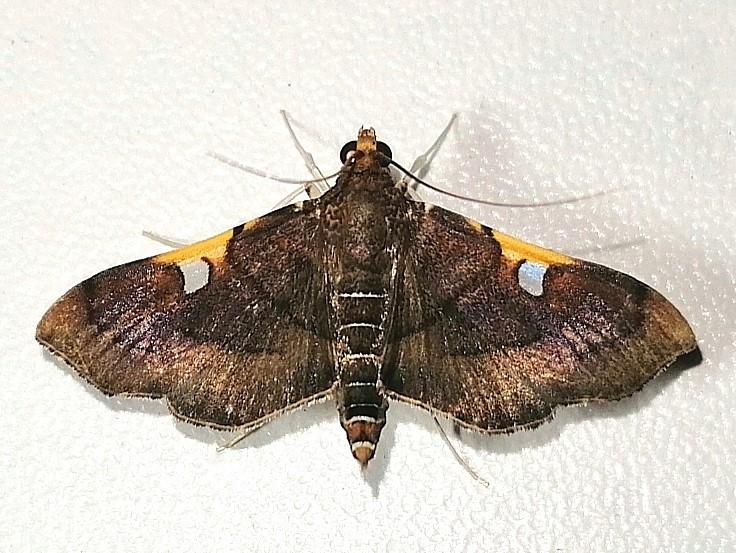
- Coenostolopsis terminalis

Scientific classification
- Kingdom: Animalia
- Phylum: Arthropoda
- Class: Insecta
- Order: Lepidoptera
- Family: Crambidae
- Tribe: Agroterini
- Genus: Coenostolopsis; Munroe, 1960

= Coenostolopsis =

Genus of moths

Coenostolopsis is a genus of moths in the family Crambidae.

== Species ==
- Coenostolopsis apicalis (Lederer, 1863)
- Coenostolopsis selenophora (Hampson, 1912)
- Coenostolopsis terminalis Munroe, 1960
