= Microthyris lelex =

Scientific classification
- Kingdom: Animalia
- Phylum: Arthropoda
- Class: Insecta
- Order: Lepidoptera
- Family: Crambidae
- Genus: Microthyris
- Species: M. lelex

Binomial name
- Microthyris lelex (Cramer, 1777)

Synonyms
- Phalaena lelex Cramer, 1777; Cyclocena lelex; Lygropia lelex; Botis flexalis Möschler, 1881; Botys janiralis Möschler, 1886; Cyclocena gestatalis Möschler, 1890; Haritala foviferalis Hampson, 1895

Species of moth

Microthyris lelex is a moth in the family Crambidae. It was described by Pieter Cramer in 1777. It is widespread in the Caribbean, Central America and northern South America. Records include Suriname, Puerto Rico and Jamaica. It has recently been recorded from southern Florida.
