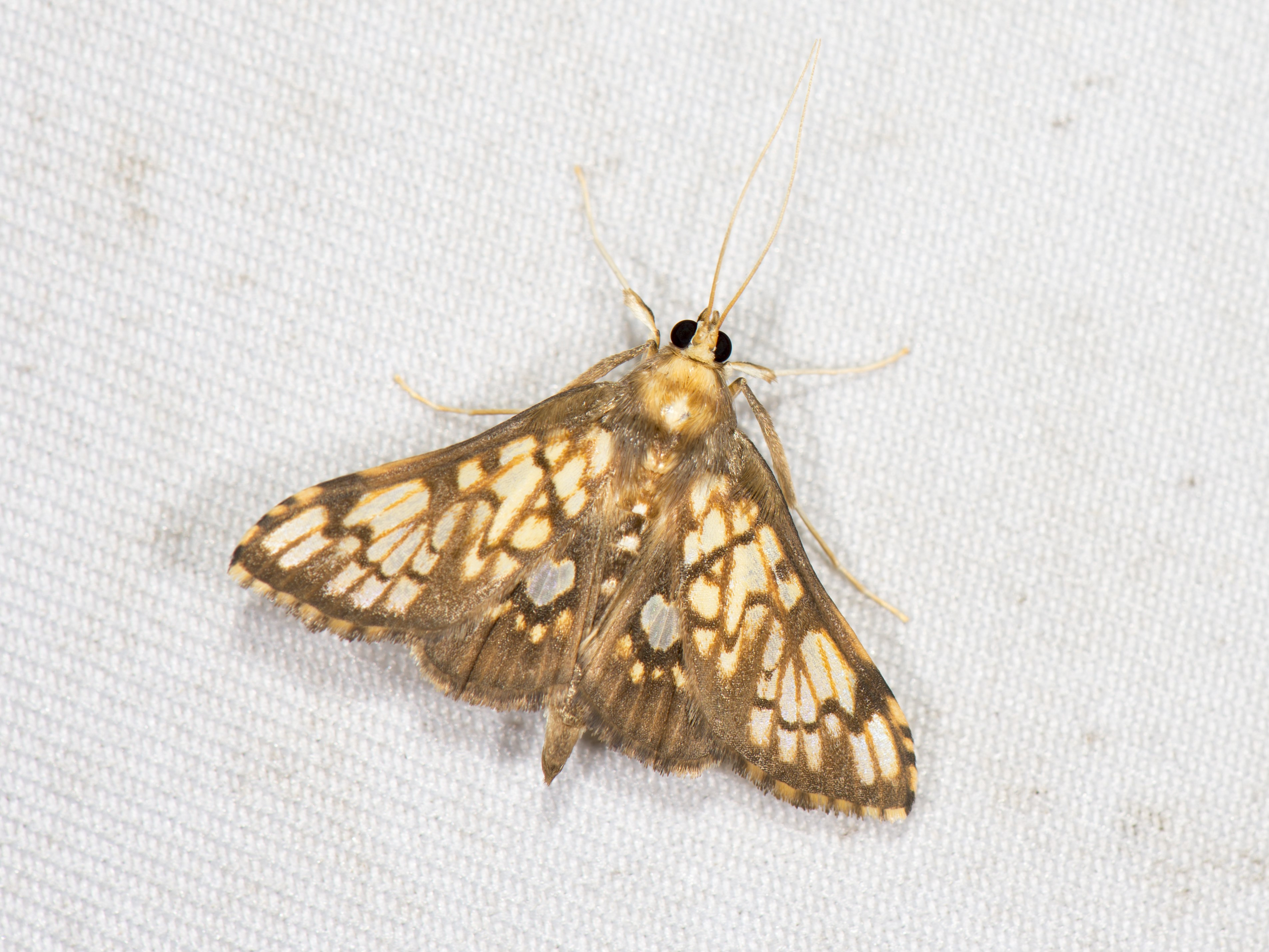
- Neoanalthes nebulalis

Scientific classification
- Kingdom: Animalia
- Phylum: Arthropoda
- Class: Insecta
- Order: Lepidoptera
- Family: Crambidae
- Subfamily: Spilomelinae
- Tribe: Agroterini
- Genus: Neoanalthes; Yamanaka & Kirpichnikova, 1993

= Neoanalthes =

Genus of moths

Neoanalthes is a genus of moths in the family Crambidae described by Hiroshi Yamanaka and Valentina A. Kirpichnikova in 1993.

== Species ==
- Neoanalthes abludens Du & Li, 2008
- Neoanalthes contortalis (Hampson, 1900)
- Neoanalthes guangxiensis Du & Li, 2008
- Neoanalthes nebulalis Yamanaka & Kirpichnikova, 1993
- Neoanalthes pseudocontortalis Yamanaka & Kirpichnikova, 1993
- Neoanalthes undatalis Du & Li, 2008
- Neoanalthes variabilis Du & Li, 2008
- Neoanalthes wangi Du & Li, 2008
