= Neoanalthes undatalis =

Scientific classification
- Kingdom: Animalia
- Phylum: Arthropoda
- Class: Insecta
- Order: Lepidoptera
- Family: Crambidae
- Genus: Neoanalthes
- Species: N. undatalis

Binomial name
- Neoanalthes undatalis Du & Li, 2008

Species of moth

Neoanalthes undatalis is a moth in the family Crambidae. It was described by Xi-Cui Du and Hou-Hun Li in 2008. It is found in Guizhou, China.
