= Haritalodes barbuti =

Scientific classification
- Kingdom: Animalia
- Phylum: Arthropoda
- Class: Insecta
- Order: Lepidoptera
- Family: Crambidae
- Genus: Haritalodes
- Species: H. barbuti

Binomial name
- Haritalodes barbuti Leraut, 2005

Species of moth

Haritalodes barbuti is a moth in the family Crambidae. Described by French entomologist (Lepidoptera) Patrice J.A. Leraut in 2005, it is found in Madagascar.
