= Gypodes =

Scientific classification
- Kingdom: Animalia
- Phylum: Arthropoda
- Class: Insecta
- Order: Lepidoptera
- Family: Crambidae
- Tribe: Agroterini
- Genus: Gypodes; Munroe, 1976
- Species: G. vexilliferalis

Binomial name
- Gypodes vexilliferalis Munroe, 1976

Genus of moths

Gypodes is a genus of moths of the family Crambidae. It contains only one species, Gypodes vexilliferalis, which is found in Brazil (Pará).
