= Haritalodes pseudoderogata =

Scientific classification
- Kingdom: Animalia
- Phylum: Arthropoda
- Class: Insecta
- Order: Lepidoptera
- Family: Crambidae
- Genus: Haritalodes
- Species: H. pseudoderogata

Binomial name
- Haritalodes pseudoderogata (Strand, 1920)

Synonyms
- Sylepta pseudoderogata Strand, 1920

Species of moth

Haritalodes pseudoderogata is a moth in the family Crambidae. It was described by Strand in 1920. It is found in Cameroon.
