= Tylostega chrysanthes =

Scientific classification
- Kingdom: Animalia
- Phylum: Arthropoda
- Clade: Pancrustacea
- Class: Insecta
- Order: Lepidoptera
- Family: Crambidae
- Genus: Tylostega
- Species: T. chrysanthes

Binomial name
- Tylostega chrysanthes Meyrick, 1894

Species of moth

Tylostega chrysanthes is a moth in the family Crambidae. It was described by Edward Meyrick in 1894. It is found on Borneo.

The wingspan is 17–19 mm. The forewings are orange, irregularly blotched with fuscous. The lines are rather irregular and dark fuscous, forming blackish spots on the costa. There is also a blackish discal mark and an almost hindmarginal row of blackish spots. The hindwings are as the forewings, but the first line is absent.
