= Haritalodes mineti =

Scientific classification
- Kingdom: Animalia
- Phylum: Arthropoda
- Class: Insecta
- Order: Lepidoptera
- Family: Crambidae
- Genus: Haritalodes
- Species: H. mineti

Binomial name
- Haritalodes mineti Leraut, 2005

Species of moth

Haritalodes mineti is a moth in the family Crambidae. Described by French entomologist Patrice J.A. Leraut in 2005, it is found in Madagascar.
