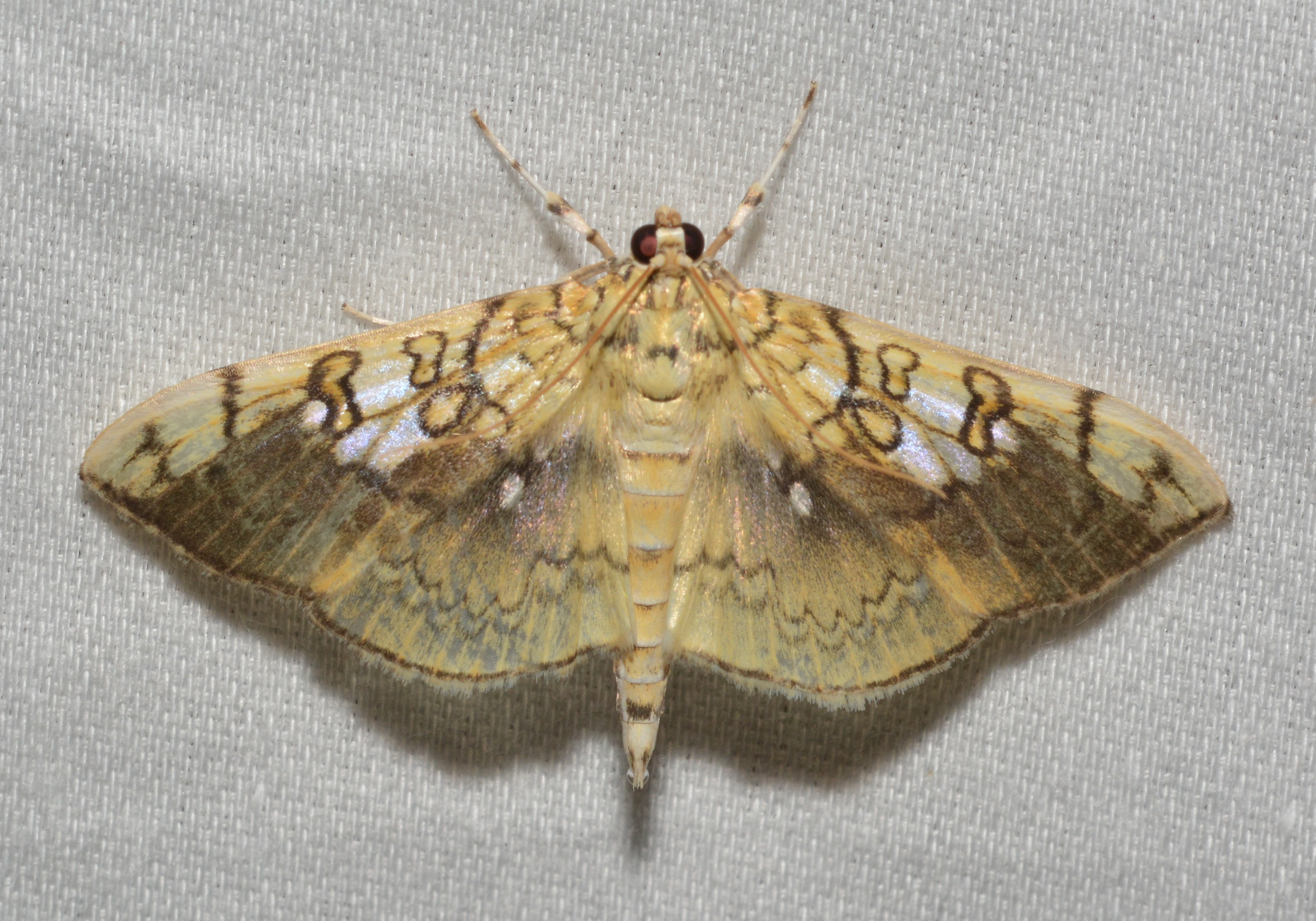
- Pantographa limata

Scientific classification
- Kingdom: Animalia
- Phylum: Arthropoda
- Clade: Pancrustacea
- Class: Insecta
- Order: Lepidoptera
- Family: Crambidae
- Subfamily: Spilomelinae
- Tribe: Agroterini
- Genus: Pantographa; Lederer, 1863

Synonyms
- Pantographis Lederer, 1863; PantograptaHampson, 1899

= Pantographa =

Genus of moths

Pantographa is a genus of moths of the family Crambidae described by Julius Lederer in 1863.

== Species ==
- Pantographa acoetesalis (Walker, 1859)
- Pantographa expansalis (Lederer, 1863)
- Pantographa gorgonalis Druce, 1895
- Pantographa idmonalis Druce, 1895
- Pantographa limata Grote & Robinson, 1867
- Pantographa prorogata (Hampson, 1912)
- Pantographa scripturalis (Guenée, 1854)
- Pantographa serratilinealis (Lederer, 1863)
- Pantographa suffusalis Druce, 1895
