= Neoanalthes variabilis =

Scientific classification
- Kingdom: Animalia
- Phylum: Arthropoda
- Class: Insecta
- Order: Lepidoptera
- Family: Crambidae
- Genus: Neoanalthes
- Species: N. variabilis

Binomial name
- Neoanalthes variabilis Du & Li, 2008

Species of moth

Neoanalthes variabilis is a moth in the family Crambidae. It was described by Xi-Cui Du and Hou-Hun Li in 2008. It is found in Henan, China.
