= Coenostolopsis selenophora =

Scientific classification
- Kingdom: Animalia
- Phylum: Arthropoda
- Clade: Pancrustacea
- Class: Insecta
- Order: Lepidoptera
- Family: Crambidae
- Genus: Coenostolopsis
- Species: C. selenophora

Binomial name
- Coenostolopsis selenophora (Hampson, 1912)

Synonyms
- Phryganodes selenophora Hampson, 1912; Phryganodes selenophera

Species of moth

Coenostolopsis selenophora is a moth in the family Crambidae. It was described by George Hampson in 1912. It is found in Colombia.
