= Microthyris microthyralis =

Scientific classification
- Kingdom: Animalia
- Phylum: Arthropoda
- Class: Insecta
- Order: Lepidoptera
- Family: Crambidae
- Genus: Microthyris
- Species: M. microthyralis

Binomial name
- Microthyris microthyralis (Snellen, 1899)

Synonyms
- Crossophora microthyralis Snellen, 1899

Species of moth

Microthyris microthyralis is a moth in the family Crambidae. It was described by Snellen in 1899. It is found in Peru and Brazil.
