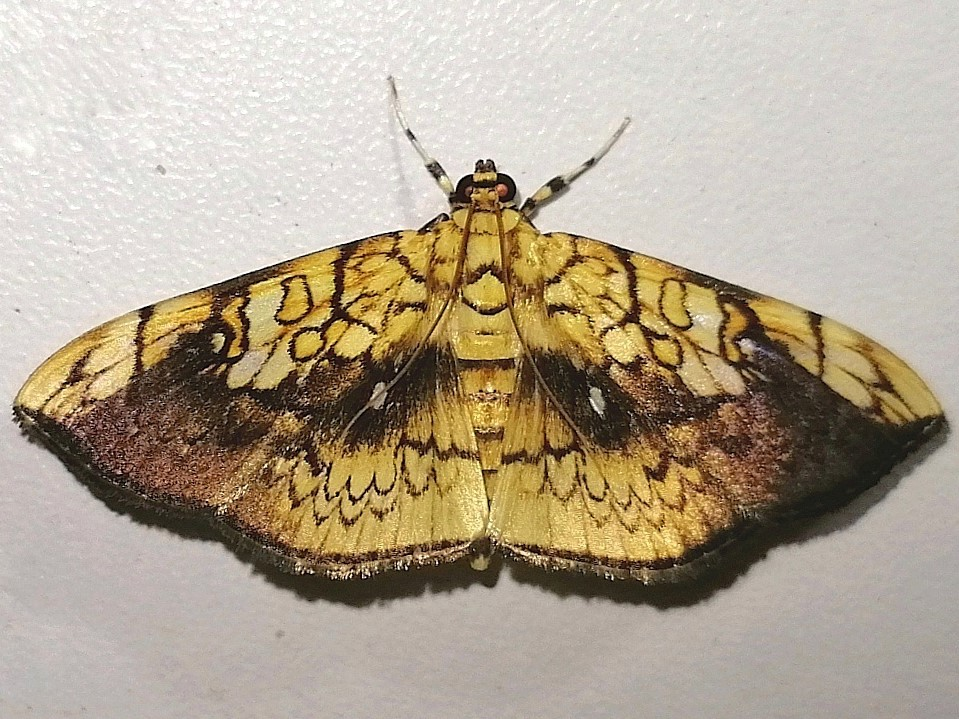

Scientific classification
- Kingdom: Animalia
- Phylum: Arthropoda
- Clade: Pancrustacea
- Class: Insecta
- Order: Lepidoptera
- Family: Crambidae
- Genus: Pantographa
- Species: P. scripturalis

Binomial name
- Pantographa scripturalis (Guenée, 1854)

Synonyms
- Pionea scripturalis Guenée, 1854

= Pantographa scripturalis =

Species of moth

Pantographa scripturalis, the Andean leaf-roller, is a species of moth in the family Crambidae. It was described by Achille Guenée in 1854. It is found in South America from Colombia to Bolivia. The habitat consists of cloud forests, where it has been recorded at altitudes between 800 and 1,800 meters.

The larvae feed on Tiliaceae species and probably other trees.
