= Alexandre Acloque =

French botanist (1871-1941)

- Born: Alexandre Noël Charles Acloque; 1871
- Died: 1941 (aged 69–70)
- Scientific career
- Fields: Lichens
- Author abbrev. (botany): Acloque

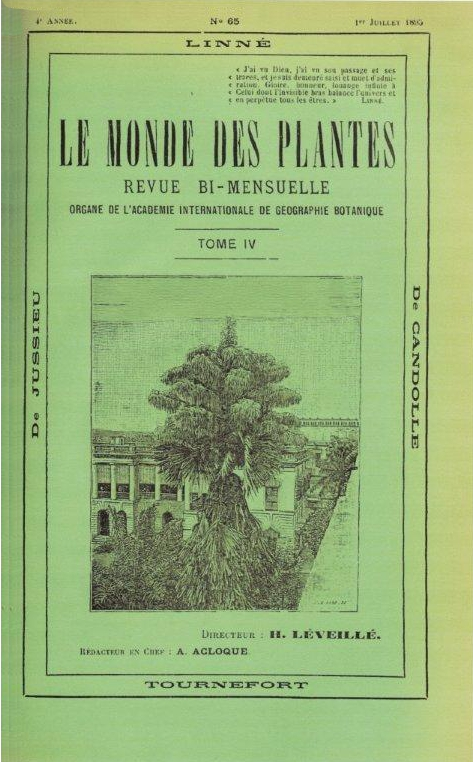
Cover of Le Monde des Plantes, number 65, 1895, which mentions Alexandre Acloque as editor-in-chief

Alexandre Noël Charles Acloque (1871–1941) was a French botanist who was an expert in lichens. Acloque was broadly interested in natural history and wrote books on the flora and fauna (insects) of France.

== Selected works ==
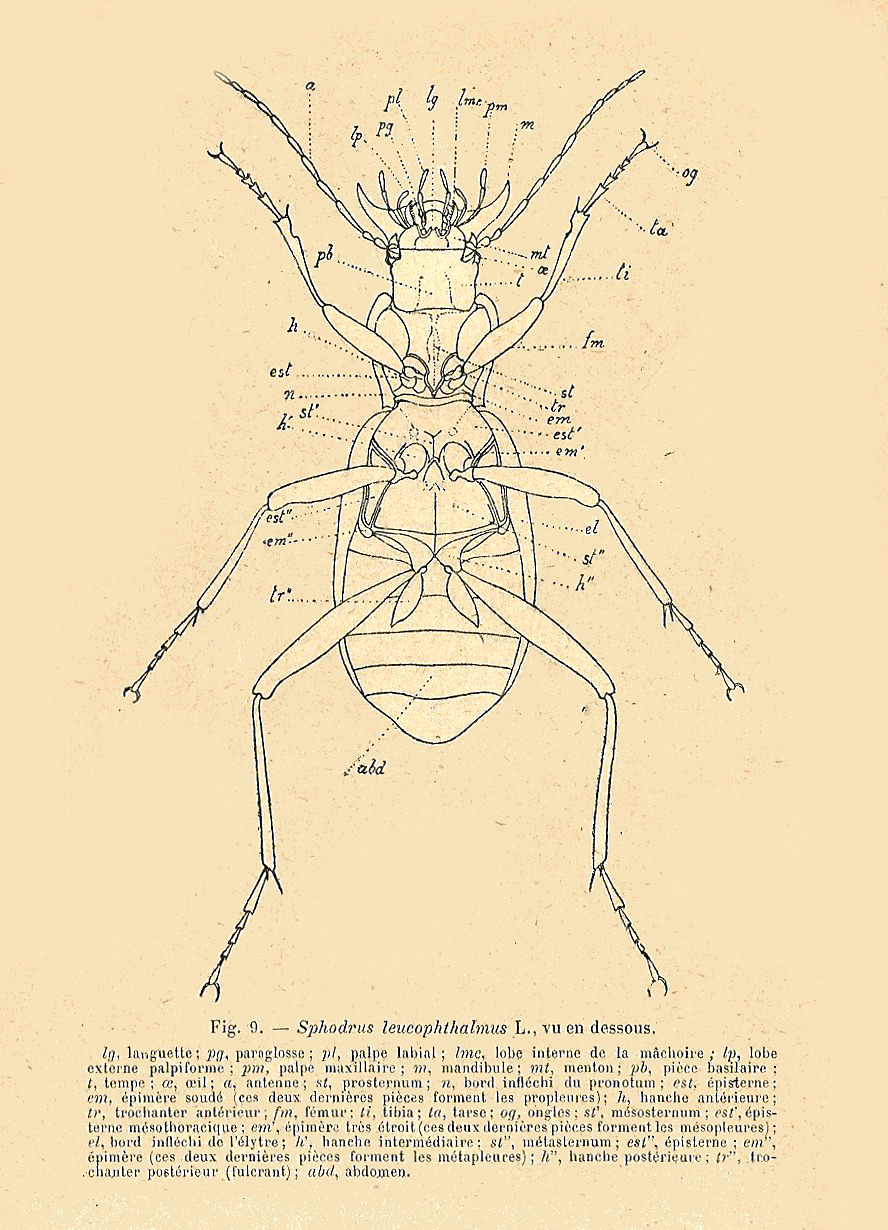
Drawing from Acloque's volume on beetles in A Fauna of France

- Les Champignons (mushrooms), 1892
- Les Lichens (lichens), 1893
- Flore de France [A Flora of France], 1894
- Faune de France [A Fauna of France], 1896–1900)
  - Mammifères (mammals)
  - Oiseaux (birds)
  - Poissons, Reptiles, Batraciens, Protochordés [Fish, Reptiles, Amphibians, Protochordats], 1 vol., in-18 de 210 p., with 294 figures
  - Coléoptères (beetles), 1 vol., in-18 de 466 p., with 1052 figures
- Les insectes nuisibles [Insect Pests], 1897
- Scènes de la vie des insectes [Scenes from the Life of Insects], 1897
- Flores régionales de France [Regional Floras of France], including the French Alps, the Pyrénées, Alsace-Lorraine, the Mediterranean, western France, and Paris
