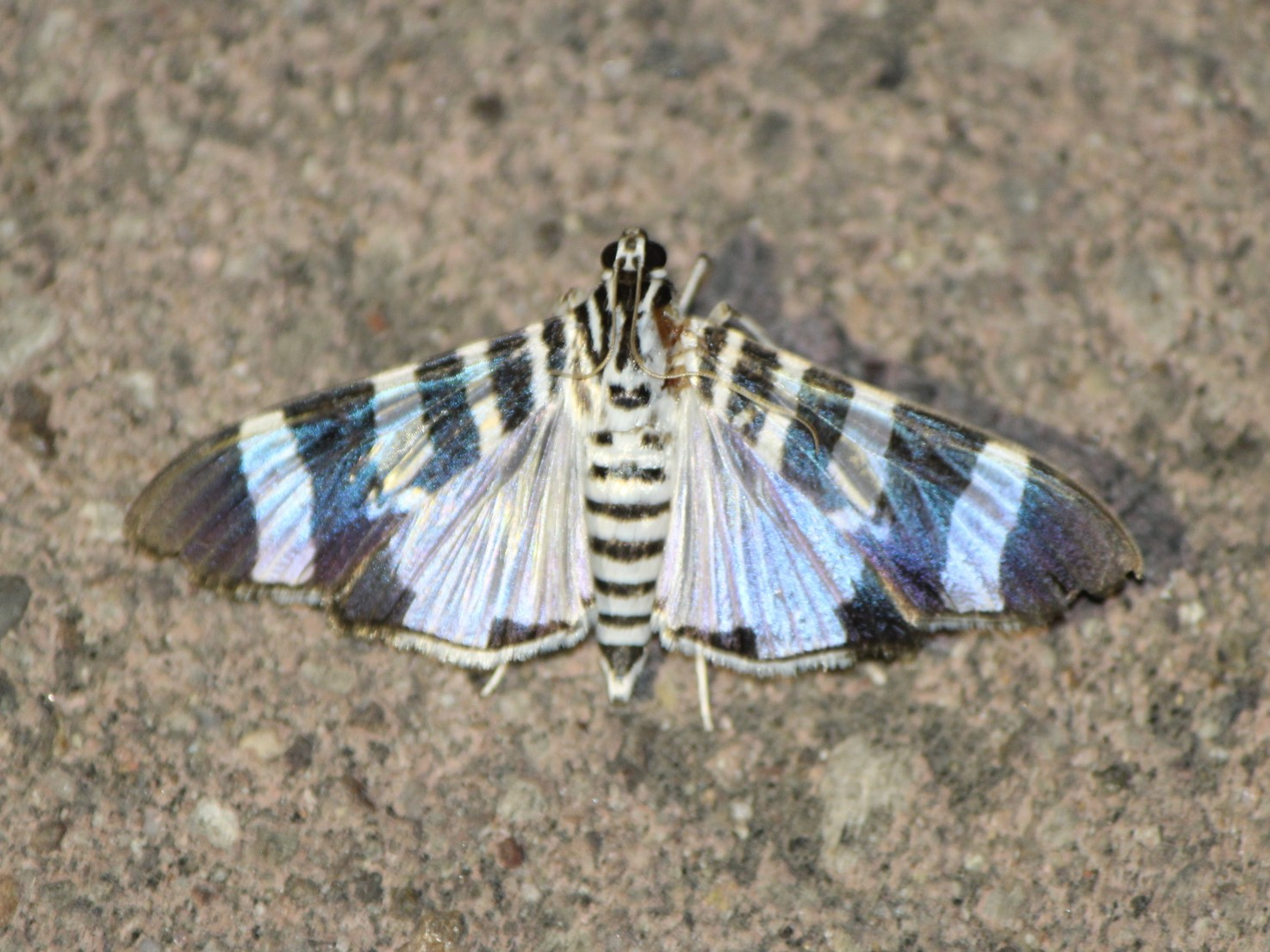

Scientific classification
- Domain: Eukaryota
- Kingdom: Animalia
- Phylum: Arthropoda
- Class: Insecta
- Order: Lepidoptera
- Family: Crambidae
- Genus: Lypotigris; Hübner, 1825
- Species: L. reginalis

Binomial name
- Lypotigris reginalis (Stoll in Cramer & Stoll, 1781)

= Lypotigris =

Lypotigris reginalis

Genus of moths

Lypotigris is a genus of moths of the family Crambidae. It is monotypic, being represented by the single species Lypotigris reginalis.
