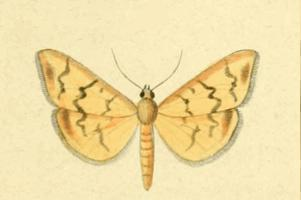

Scientific classification
- Kingdom: Animalia
- Phylum: Arthropoda
- Class: Insecta
- Order: Lepidoptera
- Family: Crambidae
- Genus: Patania
- Species: P. crocealis

Binomial name
- Patania crocealis (Duponchel, 1834)

Synonyms
- List: Botys crocealis Duponchel, 1834; Pleuroptya crocealis; Botys aurantiacalis Fischer von Röslerstamm, 1840; Pleuroptya aurantiacalis

= Patania crocealis =

Species of moth

Patania crocealis is a species of moth in the family Crambidae. It is found in France.

The wingspan is about 32 millimetres (1.3 in).

== Taxonomy ==
The species was previously listed as a synonym of Patania balteata.
