= Nagiella flavispila =

Scientific classification
- Kingdom: Animalia
- Phylum: Arthropoda
- Class: Insecta
- Order: Lepidoptera
- Family: Crambidae
- Genus: Nagiella
- Species: N. flavispila

Binomial name
- Nagiella flavispila (C. Swinhoe, 1894)

Synonyms
- Nagia flavispila C. Swinhoe, 1894

Species of moth

Nagiella flavispila is a moth in the family Crambidae. It was described by Charles Swinhoe in 1894. It is found in India.
