= Patania aedilis =

Scientific classification
- Domain: Eukaryota
- Kingdom: Animalia
- Phylum: Arthropoda
- Class: Insecta
- Order: Lepidoptera
- Family: Crambidae
- Genus: Patania
- Species: P. aedilis

Binomial name
- Patania aedilis (Meyrick, 1887)

Synonyms
- Conogethes aedilis Meyrick, 1887; Patania excurvalis Warren, 1896

Species of moth

Patania aedilis is a species of moth in the family Crambidae. It was described by Edward Meyrick in 1887. It is found in Australia, where it has been recorded from Queensland.

The wingspan is about 20 millimetres (0.79 in). The hindwings have a white margin.
