= Patania paleacalis =

Scientific classification
- Kingdom: Animalia
- Phylum: Arthropoda
- Class: Insecta
- Order: Lepidoptera
- Family: Crambidae
- Genus: Patania
- Species: P. paleacalis

Binomial name
- Patania paleacalis (Guenée, 1854)

Synonyms
- Botys paleacalis Guenée, 1854

Species of moth

Patania paleacalis is a species of moth in the family Crambidae. It was described by Achille Guenée in 1854. It is found in South Africa and Israel.
