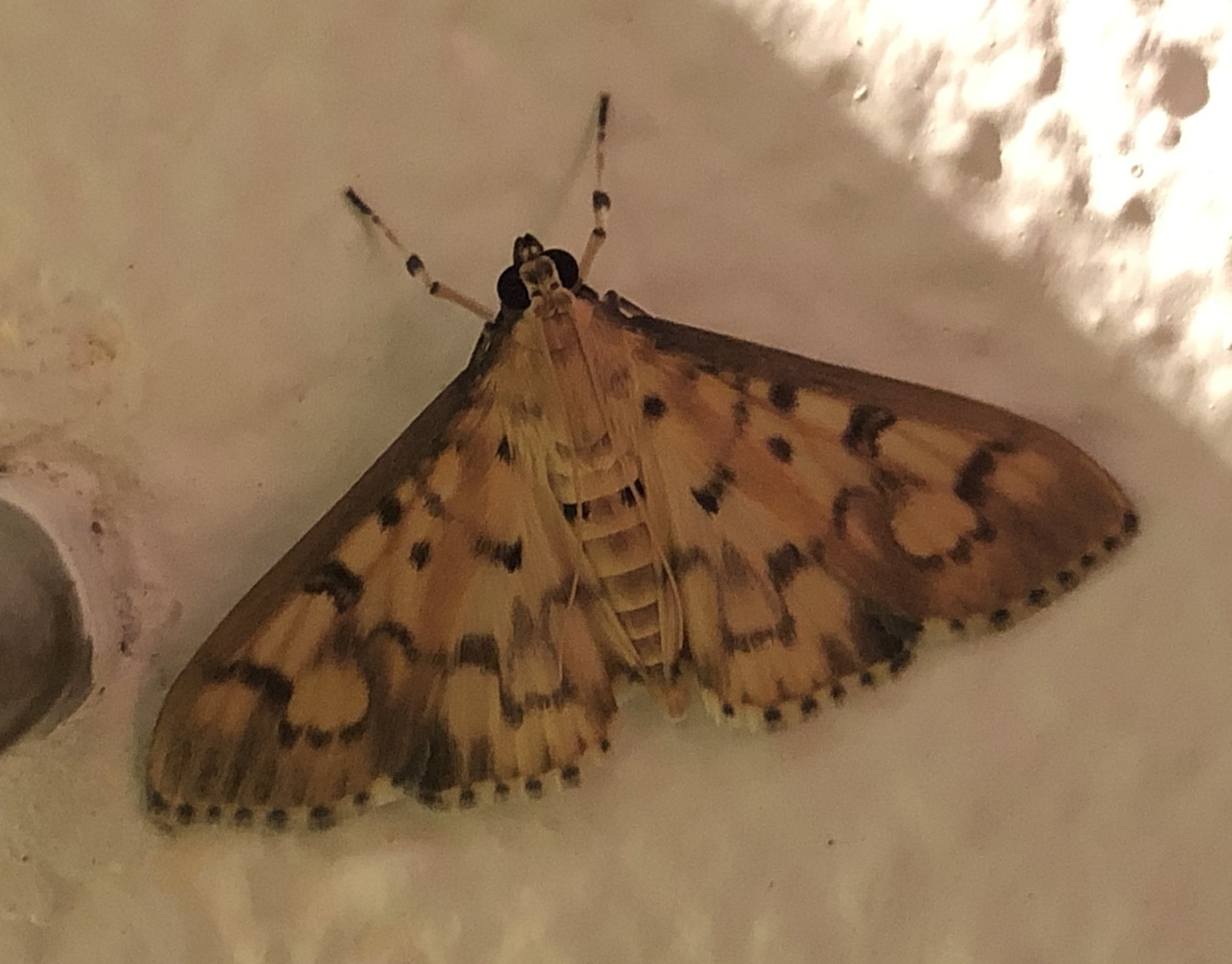

Scientific classification
- Domain: Eukaryota
- Kingdom: Animalia
- Phylum: Arthropoda
- Class: Insecta
- Order: Lepidoptera
- Family: Crambidae
- Genus: Patania
- Species: P. tenuis

Binomial name
- Patania tenuis (Warren, 1896)

Synonyms
- Notarcha tenuis Warren, 1896; Pleuroptya tenuis; Sylepta crocophanes Lower, 1902

= Patania tenuis =

Species of moth

Patania tenuis is a species of moth in the family Crambidae. It was described by Warren in 1896. It is found in Australia, where it has been recorded from Queensland.
