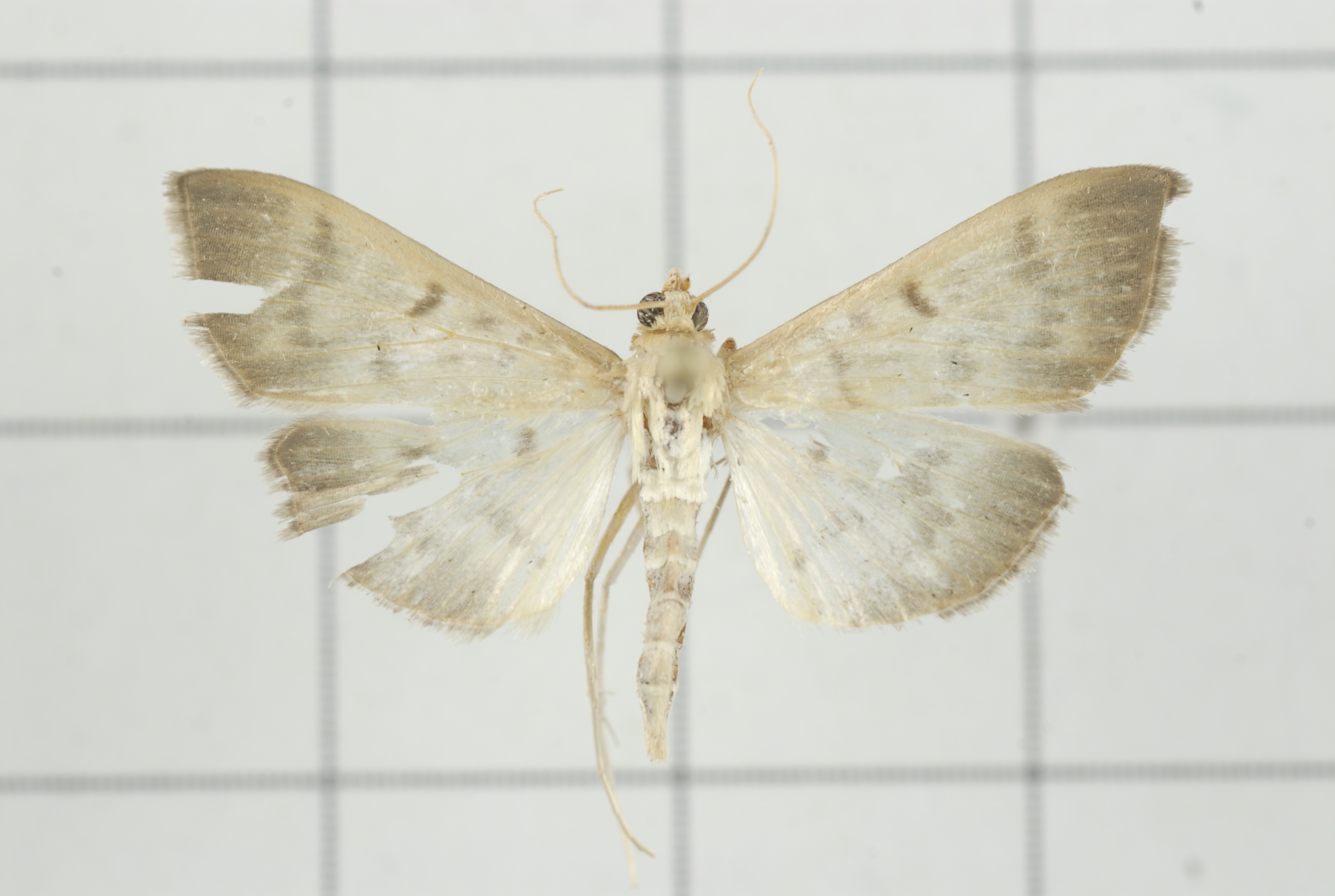

Scientific classification
- Kingdom: Animalia
- Phylum: Arthropoda
- Class: Insecta
- Order: Lepidoptera
- Family: Crambidae
- Genus: Patania
- Species: P. sabinusalis

Binomial name
- Patania sabinusalis (Walker, 1859)

Synonyms
- List: Botys sabinusalis Walker, 1859; Pleuroptya sabinusalis; Syllepte sabinusalis; Sylepta imbutalis var. taihokualis Strand, 1918; Pyrausta faecalis Strand, 1918

= Patania sabinusalis =

Species of moth

Patania sabinusalis is a species of moth in the family Crambidae. It was described by Francis Walker in 1859. It is found in Australia, Cameroon, the Democratic Republic of the Congo (North Kivu, Equateur, Orientale), Kenya, the Seychelles, Somalia, Uganda, Zambia, Sri Lanka, India, Borneo, Java, Fiji, New Guinea, Samoa, the Solomon Islands, Taiwan and Japan.

The larvae feed on Boehmeria nivea, Urera hypselodendron, Triumfetta species, Cypholophus macrocephalus, Pipturus sp. and Musa textilis (Manila hemp).
