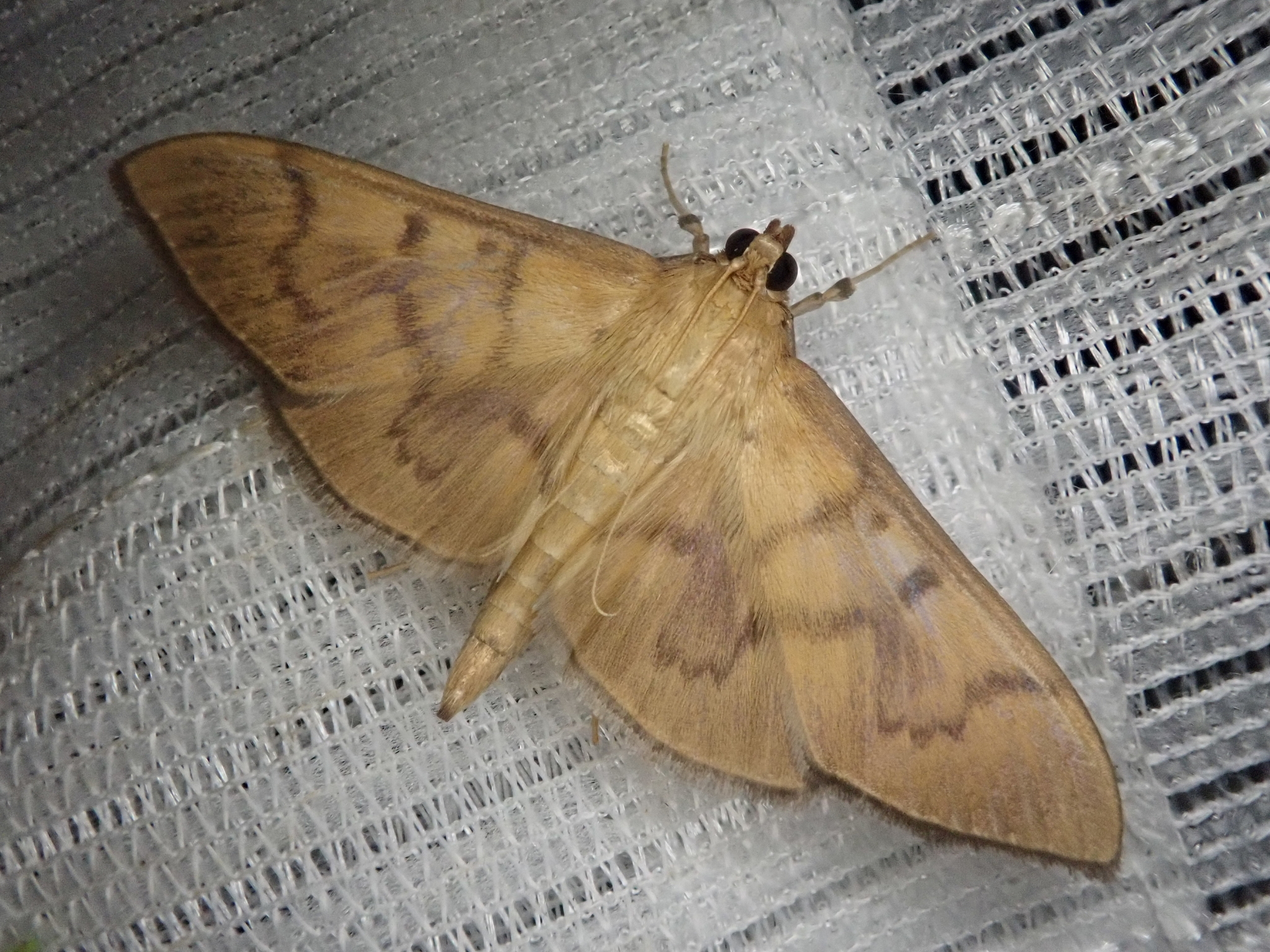

Scientific classification
- Kingdom: Animalia
- Phylum: Arthropoda
- Class: Insecta
- Order: Lepidoptera
- Family: Crambidae
- Genus: Patania
- Species: P. harutai

Binomial name
- Patania harutai (Inoue, 1955)

Synonyms
- Phostria expictalis Inoue, 1955; Pleuroptya harutai Inoue, 1955

= Patania harutai =

Species of moth

Patania harutai is a species of moth in the family Crambidae. It was described by Inoue in 1955. It is found in Japan (Honshu), China and the Russian Far East (Amur).

The wingspan is 35–42 mm.
