= Patania mysisalis =

Scientific classification
- Kingdom: Animalia
- Phylum: Arthropoda
- Class: Insecta
- Order: Lepidoptera
- Family: Crambidae
- Genus: Patania
- Species: P. mysisalis

Binomial name
- Patania mysisalis (Walker, 1859)

Synonyms
- Botys mysisalis Walker, 1859; Patania mysissalis; Gadessa impuralis Warren, 1896

Species of moth

Patania mysisalis is a species of moth in the family Crambidae. It was described by Francis Walker in 1859. It is found in Madagascar, Sierra Leone and South Africa.
