= Patania imbecilis =

Scientific classification
- Domain: Eukaryota
- Kingdom: Animalia
- Phylum: Arthropoda
- Class: Insecta
- Order: Lepidoptera
- Family: Crambidae
- Genus: Patania
- Species: P. imbecilis

Binomial name
- Patania imbecilis (Moore, 1888)

Synonyms
- Charema imbecilis Moore, 1888; Omiodes imbecilis

Species of moth

Patania imbecilis is a species of moth in the family Crambidae. It was described by Frederic Moore in 1888. It is found in Darjeeling, India.
