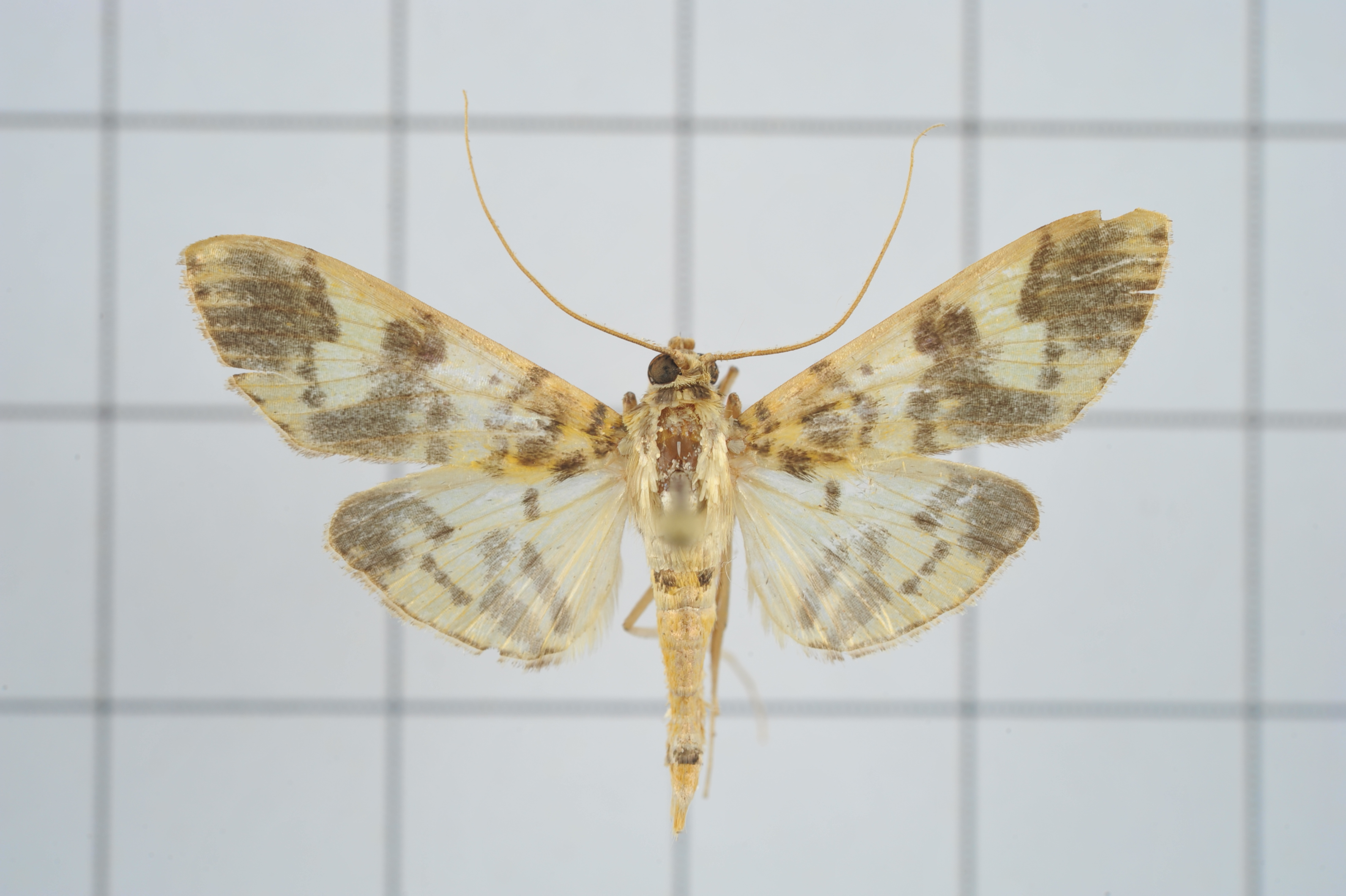

Scientific classification
- Kingdom: Animalia
- Phylum: Arthropoda
- Class: Insecta
- Order: Lepidoptera
- Family: Crambidae
- Genus: Patania
- Species: P. iopasalis

Binomial name
- Patania iopasalis (Walker, 1859)

Synonyms
- List: Botys iopasalis Hampson, 1859; Pleuroptya iopasalis; Conogethes boteralis Meyrick, 1894; Conogethes iopasalis Meyrick, 1894; Botys plagiatalis Walker 1859; Botys boteralis Walker, 1859; Botys jopasalis Moore, 1878; Botys orobenalis Snellen, 1880; Hapalia jopasalis Moore 1886; Hapalia plagiatalis Moore, 1886; Syllepta iopasalis; Syllepta iopasalis; Sylepta marcidalis Swinhoe, 1906

= Patania iopasalis =

Species of moth

Patania iopasalis is a species of moth in the family Crambidae. It was described by Francis Walker in 1859. It is found in Myanmar, India, Papua New Guinea Thailand, Sri Lanka, Borneo in Indonesia, Taiwan, China and Philippines.
