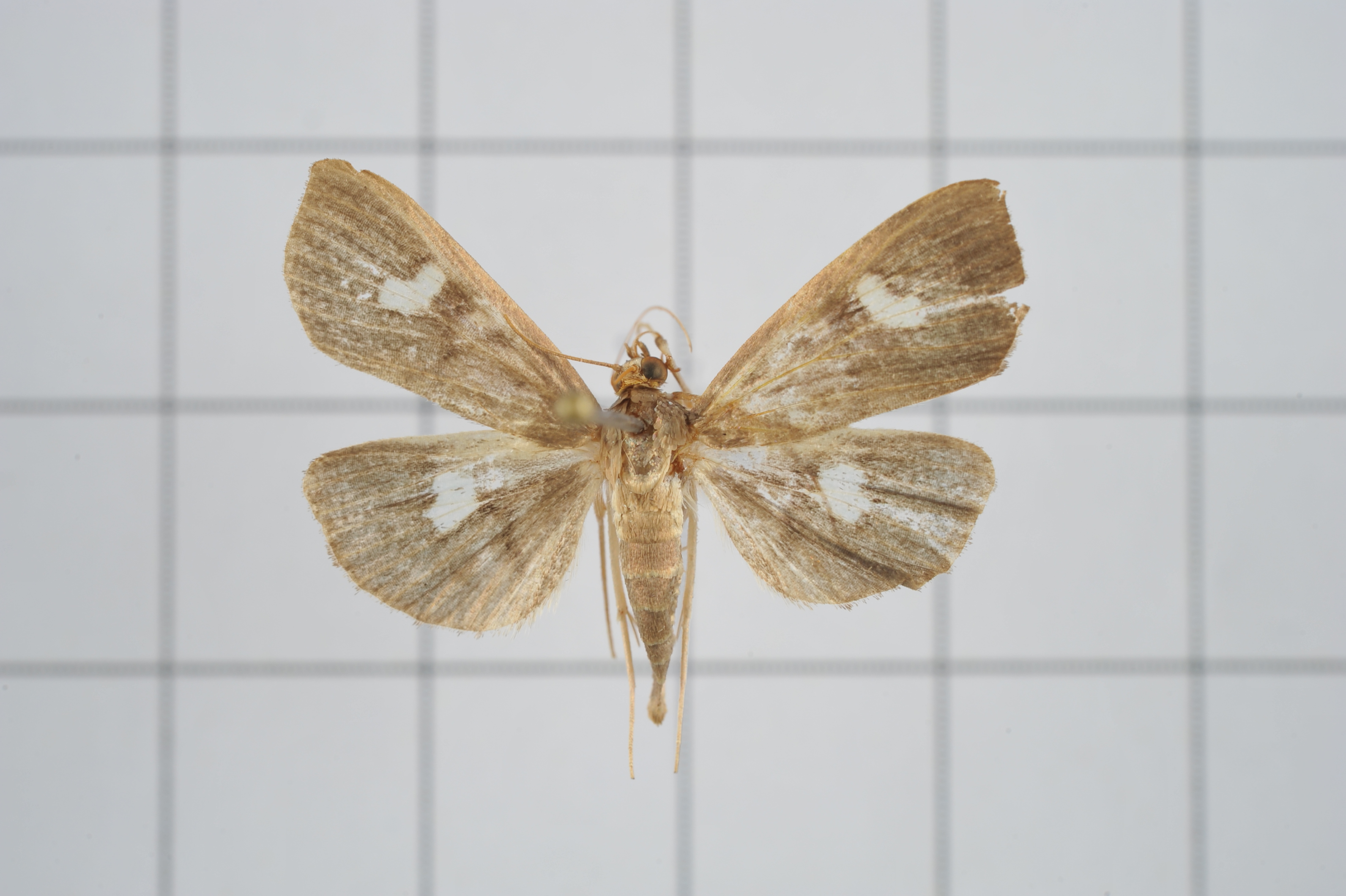

Scientific classification
- Kingdom: Animalia
- Phylum: Arthropoda
- Class: Insecta
- Order: Lepidoptera
- Family: Crambidae
- Genus: Nagiella
- Species: N. inferior

Binomial name
- Nagiella inferior (Hampson, 1899)

Synonyms
- List: Botys quadrimaculalis Motschulsky, 1861; Syllepte inferior Hampson, 1899; Sylepta inferior; Pleuroptya inferior; Patania inferior

= Nagiella inferior =

Species of moth

Nagiella inferior is a species of moth in the family Crambidae. It was described by George Hampson in 1899.

It is found in India, the Kuriles, China (Liaoning, Gansu, Shanxi, Shaanxi, Henan, Hubei, Zhejiang, Jiangsu, Jiangxi, Tibet, Sichuan, Chongqing, Guizhou, Yunnan, Guangdong, Guangxi, Hainan, Fujian), Korea, Japan, and Taiwan.

In the past, the species was placed in the genus Pleuroptya (now a synonym of Patania), of which Nagiella was long considered a synonym. The name inferior is a replacement name for Botys quadrimaculalis Motschultsky, 1861, which is a secondary homonym of the previously published name Scopula quadrimaculalis Kollar & Redtenbach, 1844.
