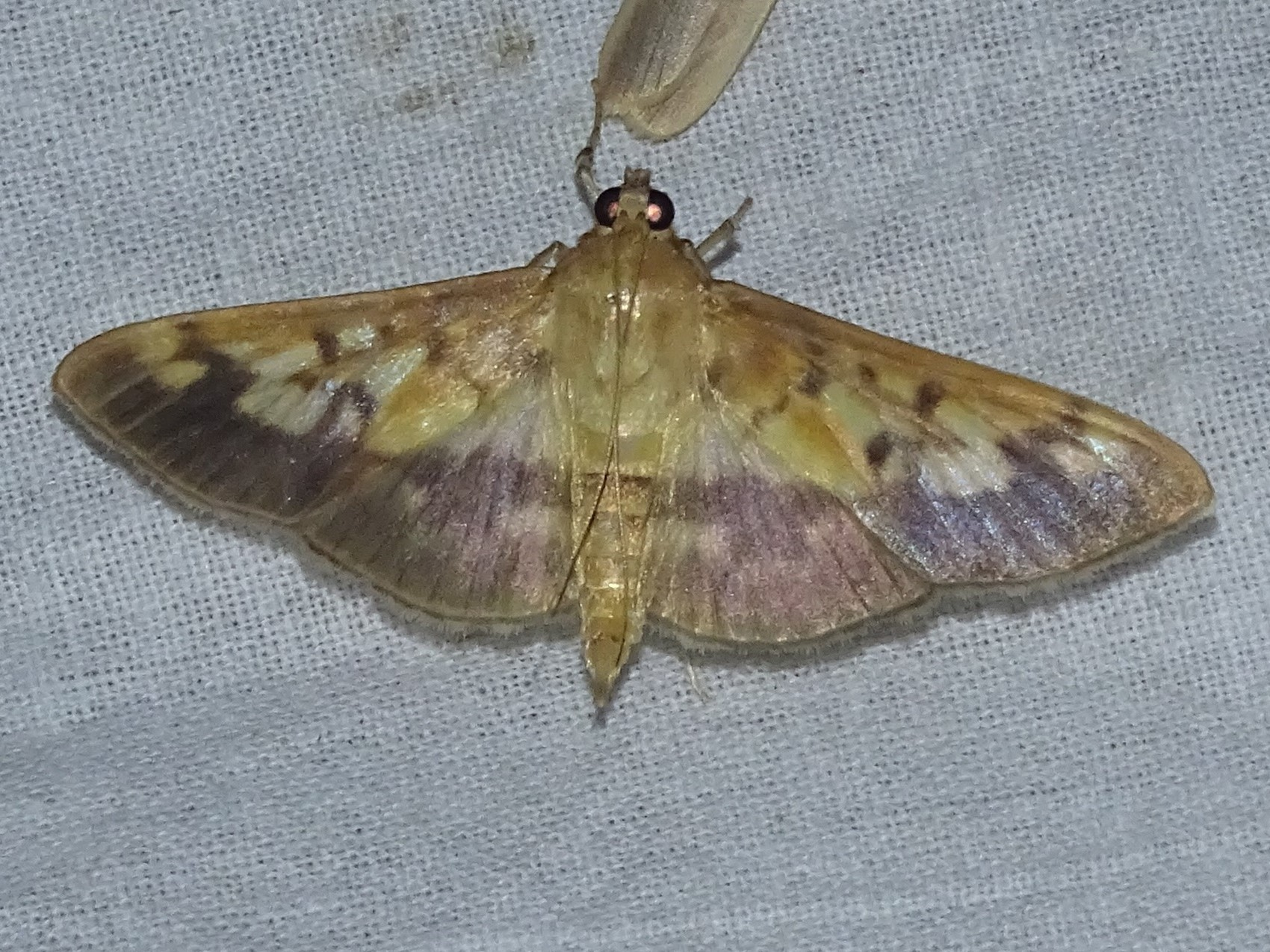

Scientific classification
- Domain: Eukaryota
- Kingdom: Animalia
- Phylum: Arthropoda
- Class: Insecta
- Order: Lepidoptera
- Family: Crambidae
- Genus: Patania
- Species: P. verecunda

Binomial name
- Patania verecunda (Warren, 1896)

Synonyms
- Loxoscia verecunda Warren, 1896; Pleuroptya verecunda

= Patania verecunda =

Species of moth

Patania verecunda is a species of moth in the family Crambidae. It was described by Warren in 1896. It is found in India (Khasia Hills).
