= Patania jatingaensis =

Scientific classification
- Domain: Eukaryota
- Kingdom: Animalia
- Phylum: Arthropoda
- Class: Insecta
- Order: Lepidoptera
- Family: Crambidae
- Genus: Patania
- Species: P. jatingaensis

Binomial name
- Patania jatingaensis Rose & Singh, 1989

Synonyms
- Syllepte jatingaensis

Species of moth

Patania jatingaensis is a species of moth in the family Crambidae. It was described by Rose and Singh in 1989. It is found in India (Assam).
