= Patania palliventralis =

Scientific classification
- Kingdom: Animalia
- Phylum: Arthropoda
- Class: Insecta
- Order: Lepidoptera
- Family: Crambidae
- Genus: Patania
- Species: P. palliventralis

Binomial name
- Patania palliventralis (Snellen, 1890)

Synonyms
- Omiodes palliventralis Snellen, 1890

Species of moth

Patania palliventralis is a species of moth in the family Crambidae. It was described by Snellen in 1890. It is found in India (Sikkim).
