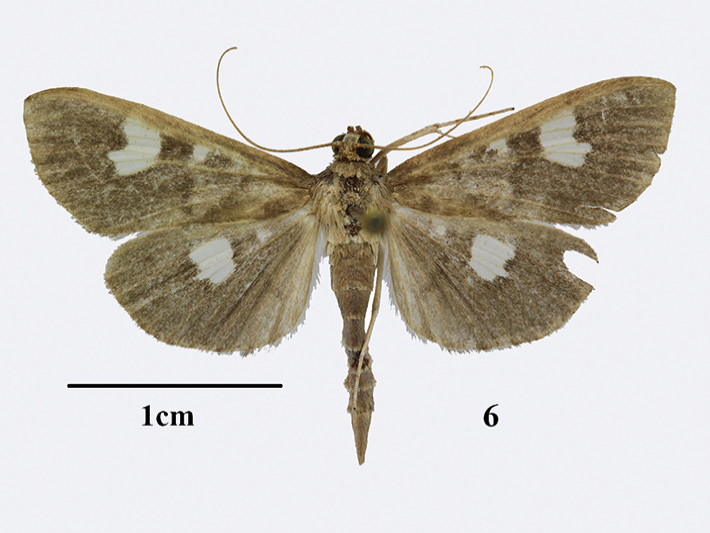

Scientific classification
- Kingdom: Animalia
- Phylum: Arthropoda
- Class: Insecta
- Order: Lepidoptera
- Family: Crambidae
- Genus: Nagiella
- Species: N. quadrimaculalis

Binomial name
- Nagiella quadrimaculalis (Kollar & Redtenbacher, 1844)

Synonyms
- Scopula quadrimaculalis Kollar & Redtenbacher, 1844; Nagia desmialis Walker, 1866; Nagiella desmialis (Walker, 1866); Pleuroptya quadrimaculalis; Patania quadrimaculalis

= Nagiella quadrimaculalis =

Species of moth

Nagiella quadrimaculalis is a moth in the subfamily Spilomelinae in the family Crambidae. It is widely distributed in southern and eastern Asia and is known from Nepal, Northeast India (Sikkim), China (Heilongjiang, Liaoning, Gansu, Shanxi, Shaanxi, Henan, Hebei, Hubei, Shandong, Hunan, Zhejiang, Jiangxi, Tibet, Sichuan, Chongqing, Guizhou, Yunnan, Guangdong, Guangxi, Hainan, Fujian), the Russian Far East (Amur and Primorye regions, Kuriles), Korea, Japan (Hokkaido, Honshu, Shikoku, Kyushu, Tsushima, Yakushima), Taiwan, Indonesia and Malaysia (including Borneo). It is also present in the former Équateur province in the Democratic Republic of the Congo.

The wingspan is 26–43 mm (1.0–1.7 in). The wings are brown. The larvae feed on Rhus chinensis (Anacardiaceae).

In the past, the species was placed in the genus Pleuroptya (now a synonym of Patania), of which Nagiella was long considered a synonym.
