= Patania ultimalis =

Scientific classification
- Domain: Eukaryota
- Kingdom: Animalia
- Phylum: Arthropoda
- Class: Insecta
- Order: Lepidoptera
- Family: Crambidae
- Genus: Patania
- Species: P. ultimalis

Binomial name
- Patania ultimalis (Walker, 1859)

Synonyms
- Botys ultimalis Walker, 1859; Pleuroptya ultimalis

Species of moth

Patania ultimalis is a species of moth in the family Crambidae. It was described by Francis Walker in 1859. It is found in Sri Lanka, Myanmar, Japan, Taiwan and Australia.

The wingspan is 25–27 millimetres (0.98–1.06 in).

The larvae feed on Idesia polycarpa.
