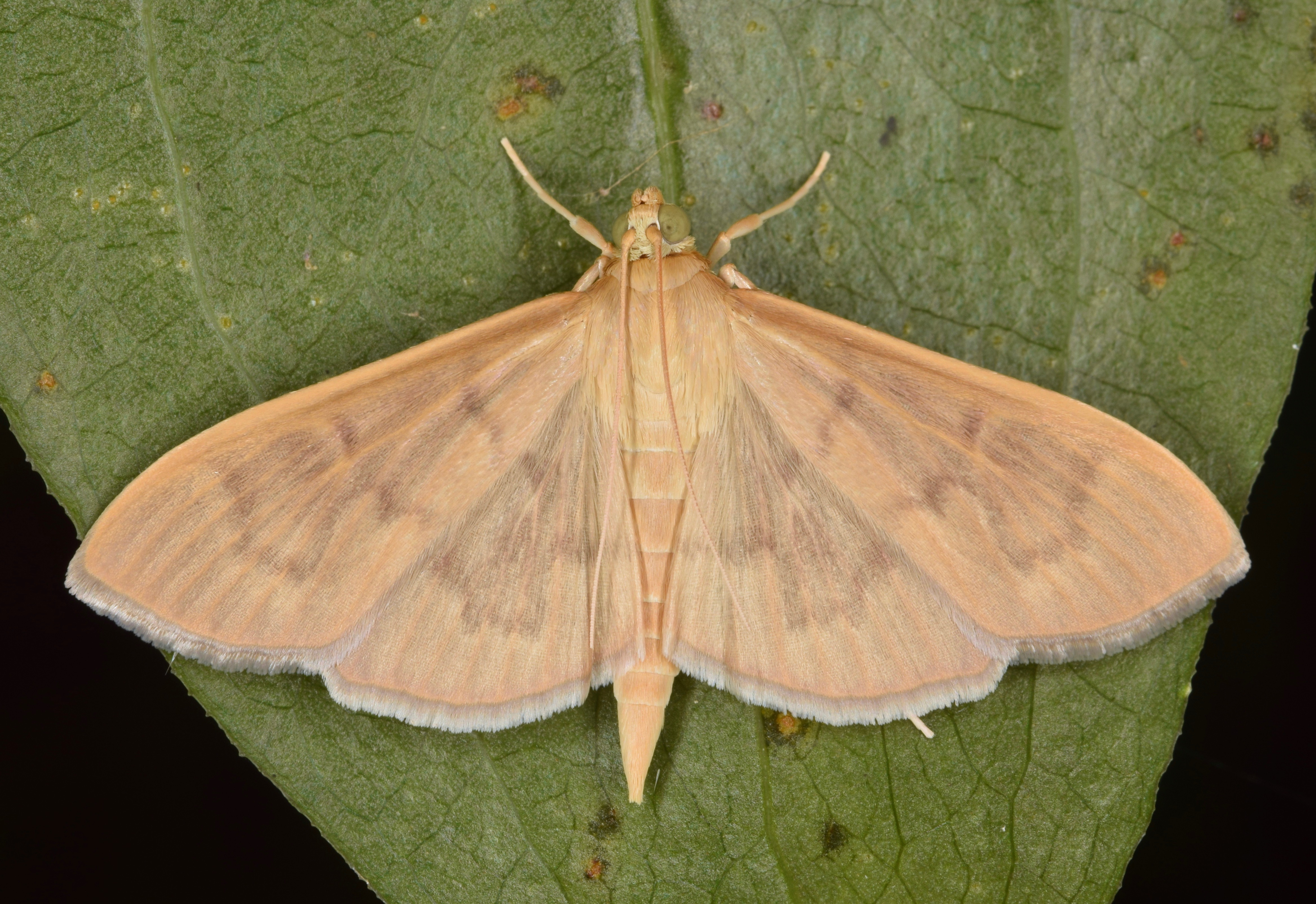

Scientific classification
- Kingdom: Animalia
- Phylum: Arthropoda
- Class: Insecta
- Order: Lepidoptera
- Family: Crambidae
- Genus: Patania
- Species: P. silicalis

Binomial name
- Patania silicalis (Guenée, 1854)

Synonyms
- List: Botys silicalis Guenée, 1854; Pleuroptya silicalis; Botys cypraealis Walker, 1859; Condylorrhiza sublutalis Druce, 1895; Hapalia sublutalis Warren, 1889; Sylepta fluctuosalis Lederer, 1863; Sylepta penumbralis Grote, 1877

= Patania silicalis =

Species of moth

Patania silicalis, commonly known as the herbivorous pleuroptya moth, is a species of moth in the subfamily Spilomelinae of the family Crambidae. It was described by Achille Guenée in 1854. It is found in Brazil, Venezuela, Ecuador, French Guiana, Guyana, Guatemala, Costa Rica, Panama, Mexico, Cuba, Jamaica, Puerto Rico, Hispaniola and the United States, where it has been recorded from Missouri, Michigan, Ohio and New York, south to Florida.

== Description ==
The wingspan is 24–26 millimetres (0.94–1.02 in). Adults are on wing in summer in North America.

== Behaviour and ecology ==
The larvae feed on Polygonum, Ipomoea batatas, Ipomoea setifera, Merremia umbellata, Rivina humilis, Bougainvillea spectabilis and Boehmeria nivea.
