= Patania aegrotalis =

Scientific classification
- Domain: Eukaryota
- Kingdom: Animalia
- Phylum: Arthropoda
- Class: Insecta
- Order: Lepidoptera
- Family: Crambidae
- Genus: Patania
- Species: P. aegrotalis

Binomial name
- Patania aegrotalis (Zeller, 1852)

Synonyms
- Botys aegrotalis Zeller, 1852; Pleuroptya aegrotalis

Species of moth

Patania aegrotalis is a species of moth in the family Crambidae. It was described by Zeller in 1852. It is found in the Democratic Republic of the Congo, Ethiopia, South Africa, Gambia, Yemen and possibly the Seychelles.
