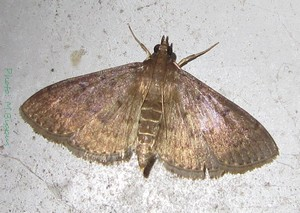

Scientific classification
- Domain: Eukaryota
- Kingdom: Animalia
- Phylum: Arthropoda
- Class: Insecta
- Order: Lepidoptera
- Family: Crambidae
- Genus: Patania
- Species: P. violacealis

Binomial name
- Patania violacealis (Guillermet, 1996)

Synonyms
- Syllepte violacealis Guillermet, 1996; Pleuroptya violacealis

= Patania violacealis =

Species of moth

Patania violacealis is a species of moth in the family Crambidae that is endemic in Réunion. The wingspan of this moth is approx. 25mm.

It very similar to Herpetogramma licarsisalis in appearance, but under light the surface of its wings shines violet.

== See also ==
- List of moths of Réunion
