= Patania menoni =

Scientific classification
- Domain: Eukaryota
- Kingdom: Animalia
- Phylum: Arthropoda
- Class: Insecta
- Order: Lepidoptera
- Family: Crambidae
- Genus: Patania
- Species: P. menoni

Binomial name
- Patania menoni Kirti & Gill, 2007

Species of moth

Patania menoni is a species of moth in the family Crambidae. It was described by Jagbir Singh Kirti and Navneet Singh Gill in 2007. It is found in Arunachal Pradesh, India.
