= Patania tardalis =

Scientific classification
- Kingdom: Animalia
- Phylum: Arthropoda
- Class: Insecta
- Order: Lepidoptera
- Family: Crambidae
- Genus: Patania
- Species: P. tardalis

Binomial name
- Patania tardalis (Snellen, 1880)

Synonyms
- Botys tardalis Snellen, 1880

Species of moth

Patania tardalis is a species of moth in the family Crambidae. It was described by Snellen in 1880. It is found in Indonesia (Sulawesi).
