= Patania tchadalis =

Scientific classification
- Domain: Eukaryota
- Kingdom: Animalia
- Phylum: Arthropoda
- Class: Insecta
- Order: Lepidoptera
- Family: Crambidae
- Genus: Patania
- Species: P. tchadalis

Binomial name
- Patania tchadalis (P. Leraut, 2005)

Synonyms
- Pleuroptya tchadalis P. Leraut, 2005

Species of moth

Patania tchadalis is a species of moth in the family Crambidae. It was described by Patrice Leraut in 2005. It is found in Chad, Sudan and Tanzania.
