= Patania agilis =

Scientific classification
- Kingdom: Animalia
- Phylum: Arthropoda
- Clade: Pancrustacea
- Class: Insecta
- Order: Lepidoptera
- Family: Crambidae
- Genus: Patania
- Species: P. agilis

Binomial name
- Patania agilis (Meyrick, 1936)

Synonyms
- Sylepta agilis Meyrick, 1936; Pleuroptya agilis

Species of moth

Patania agilis is a species of moth in the family Crambidae. It was described by Edward Meyrick in 1936. It is found in the Democratic Republic of the Congo (Orientale, North Kivu, Katanga, Equateur).
