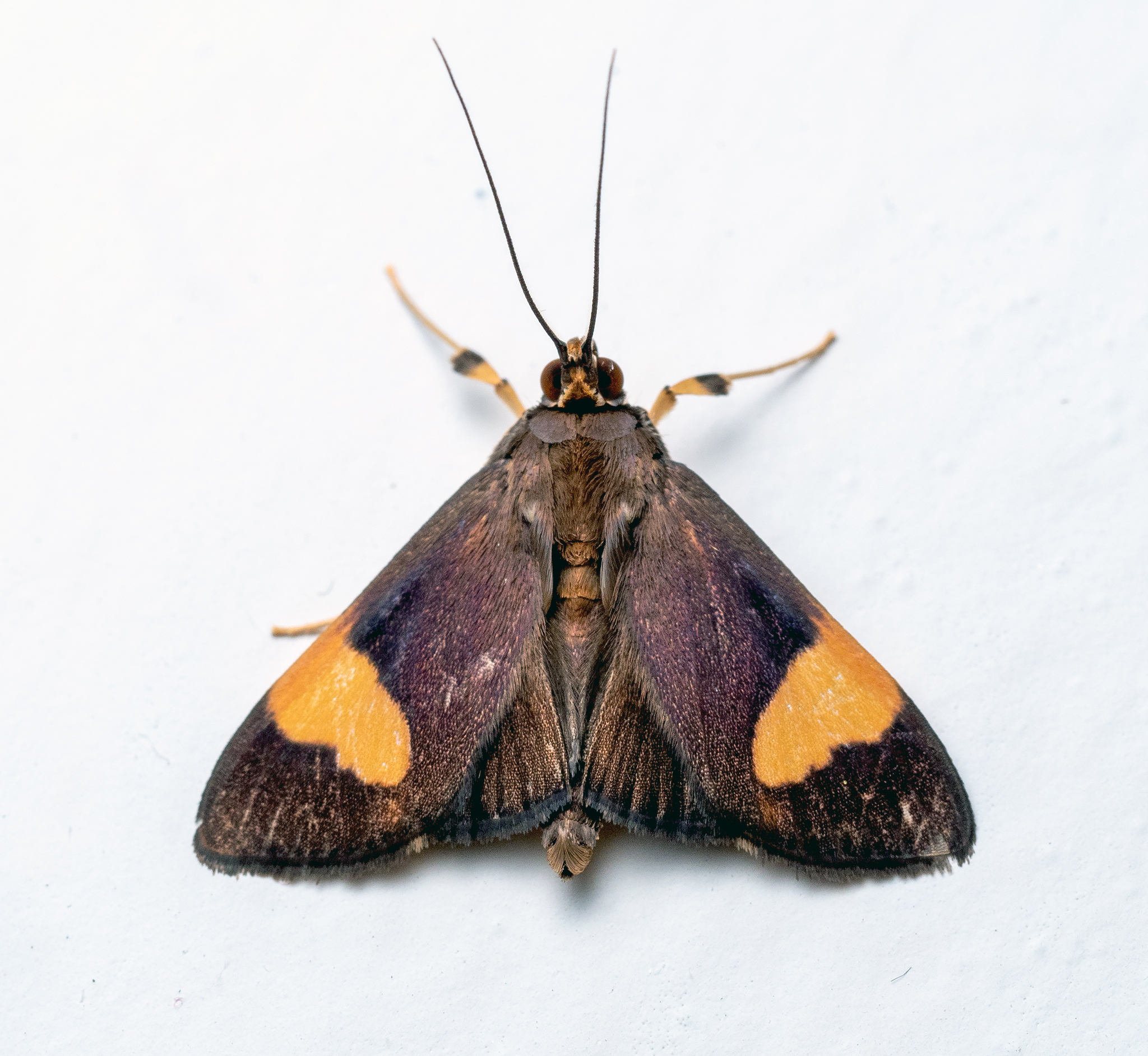

Scientific classification
- Domain: Eukaryota
- Kingdom: Animalia
- Phylum: Arthropoda
- Class: Insecta
- Order: Lepidoptera
- Family: Crambidae
- Genus: Patania
- Species: P. concatenalis

Binomial name
- Patania concatenalis (Walker, 1866)

Synonyms
- Botys concatenalis Walker, 1866

= Patania concatenalis =

Species of moth

Patania concatenalis is a species of moth in the family Crambidae. It was described by Francis Walker in 1866. It is found in Darjeeling, India.
