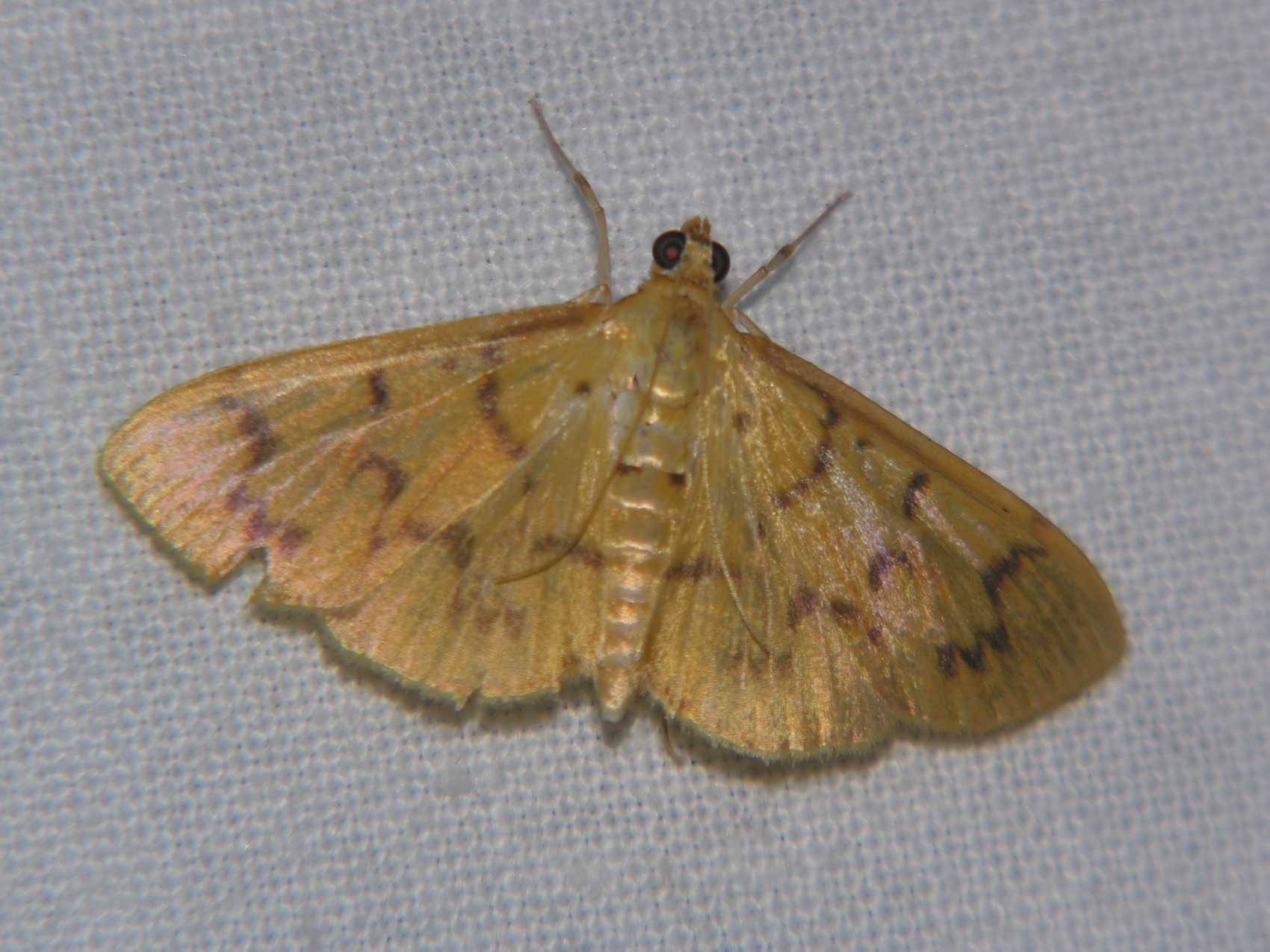

Scientific classification
- Domain: Eukaryota
- Kingdom: Animalia
- Phylum: Arthropoda
- Class: Insecta
- Order: Lepidoptera
- Family: Crambidae
- Genus: Patania
- Species: P. symphonodes

Binomial name
- Patania symphonodes (Turner, 1913)

Synonyms
- Sylepta symphonodes Turner, 1913; Pleuroptya symphonodes

= Patania symphonodes =

Species of moth

Patania symphonodes is a species of moth in the family Crambidae. It was described by Turner in 1913. It is found in Australia, where it has been recorded from Queensland.

The wings are translucent brown with wiggly brown lines.
