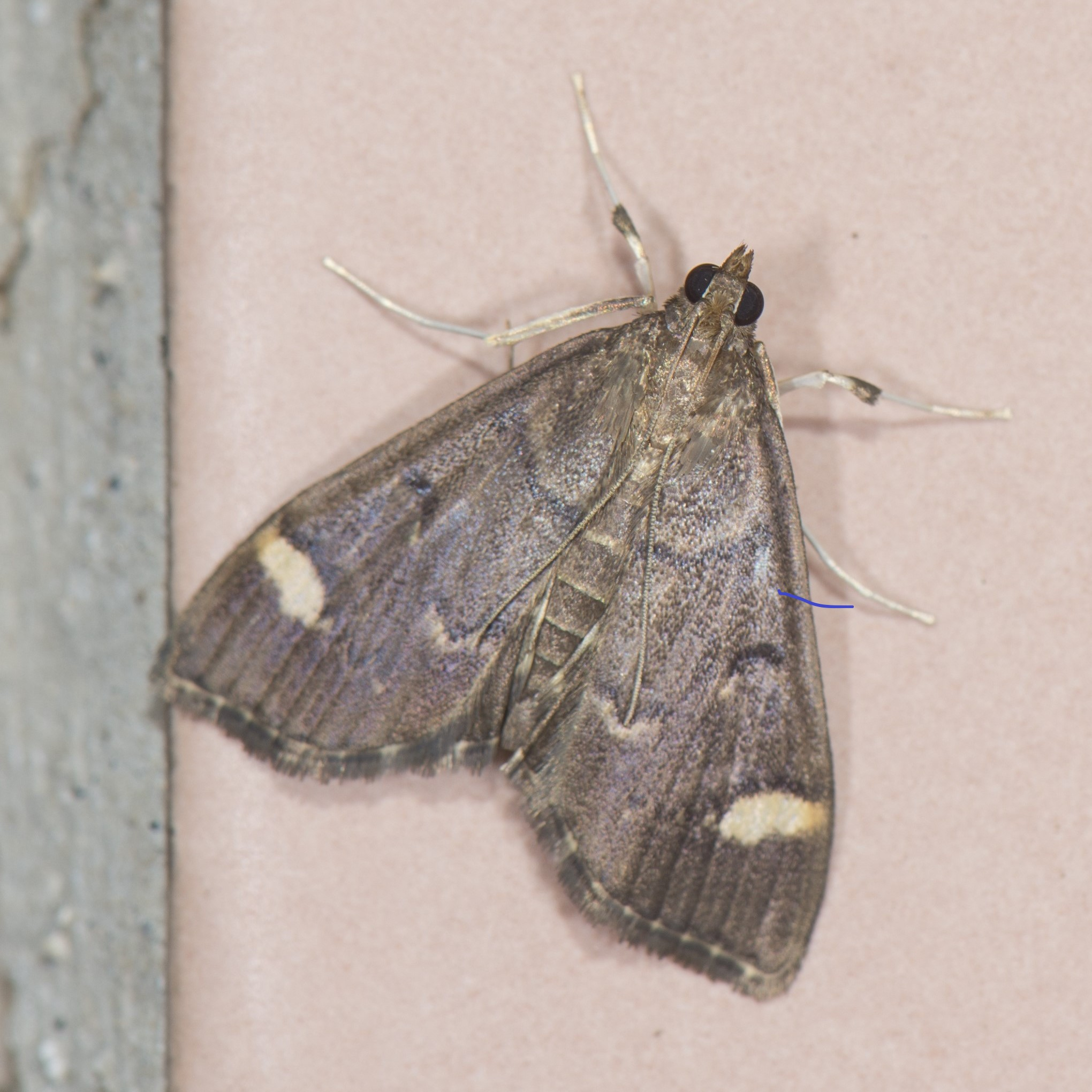

Scientific classification
- Kingdom: Animalia
- Phylum: Arthropoda
- Class: Insecta
- Order: Lepidoptera
- Family: Crambidae
- Genus: Patania
- Species: P. deficiens

Binomial name
- Patania deficiens (Moore, 1887)

Synonyms
- Ceptobasis deficiens Moore, 1887; Pleuroptya deficiens; Nacoleia sounkeana Matsumura, 1927

= Patania deficiens =

Species of moth

Patania deficiens is a species of moth in the family Crambidae described by Frederic Moore in 1887. It is found in India, Indonesia, Japan, Korea, Russia and Taiwan.
