= Patania pauperalis =

Scientific classification
- Domain: Eukaryota
- Kingdom: Animalia
- Phylum: Arthropoda
- Class: Insecta
- Order: Lepidoptera
- Family: Crambidae
- Genus: Patania
- Species: P. pauperalis

Binomial name
- Patania pauperalis (Marion, 1954)

Synonyms
- Sylepta pauperalis Marion, 1954; Pleuroptya pauperalis

Species of moth

Patania pauperalis is a species of moth in the family Crambidae. It was described by Hubert Marion in 1954. It is found on Madagascar.
