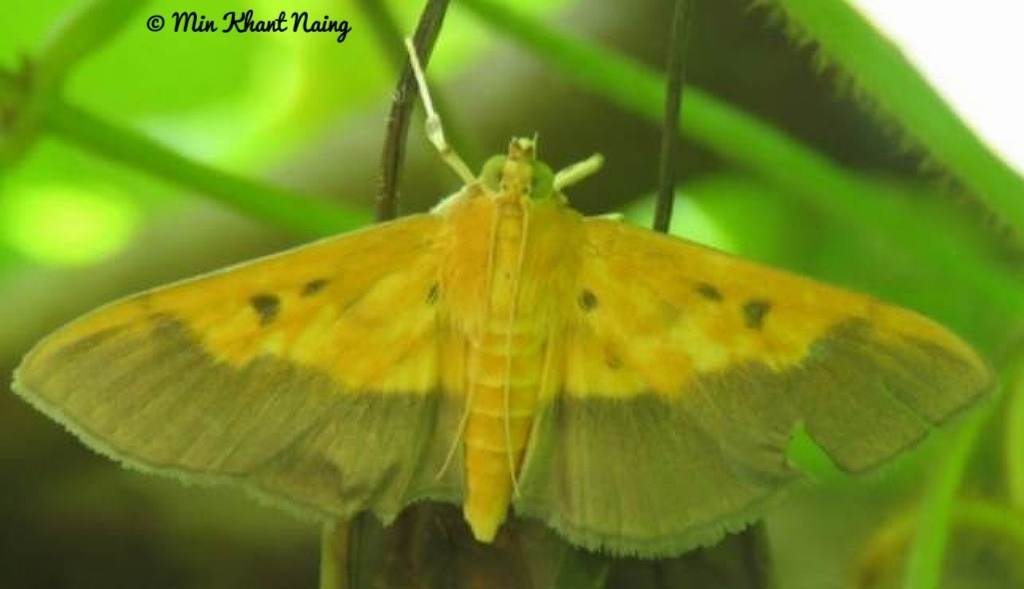

Scientific classification
- Kingdom: Animalia
- Phylum: Arthropoda
- Class: Insecta
- Order: Lepidoptera
- Family: Crambidae
- Genus: Patania
- Species: P. scinisalis

Binomial name
- Patania scinisalis (Walker, 1859)

Synonyms
- Botys scinisalis Walker, 1859; Pleuroptya scinisalis; Botys restrictalis Snellen, 1890

= Patania scinisalis =

Species of moth

Patania scinisalis is a species of moth in the family Crambidae. It was described by Francis Walker in 1859. It is found in the Himalayas, India (Assam), Myanmar, Taiwan and Japan.
