= Patania batrachina =

Scientific classification
- Kingdom: Animalia
- Phylum: Arthropoda
- Class: Insecta
- Order: Lepidoptera
- Family: Crambidae
- Genus: Patania
- Species: P. batrachina

Binomial name
- Patania batrachina (Meyrick, 1936)

Synonyms
- Sylepta batrachina Meyrick, 1936; Pleuroptya batrachina

Species of moth

Patania batrachina is a species of moth in the family Crambidae. It was described by Edward Meyrick in 1936. It is found in the Democratic Republic of the Congo (Equateur).

The larvae feed on Fleurya aestuans and Boehmeria nivea.
