= Patania ferrugalis =

Scientific classification
- Kingdom: Animalia
- Phylum: Arthropoda
- Class: Insecta
- Order: Lepidoptera
- Family: Crambidae
- Genus: Patania
- Species: P. ferrugalis

Binomial name
- Patania ferrugalis (Fabricius, 1781)

Synonyms
- Phalaena ferrugalis Fabricius, 1781; Pleuroptya ferrugalis; Pyrausta rufilinealis Hampson, 1910

Species of moth

Patania expictalis is a species of moth in the family Crambidae. It was described by Johan Christian Fabricius in 1781. It is found in the Democratic Republic of the Congo (Orientale Province) and Zambia.
