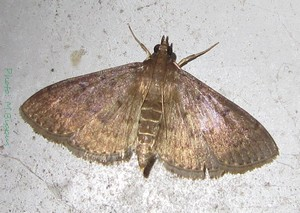
- Patania violacealis

Scientific classification
- Domain: Eukaryota
- Kingdom: Animalia
- Phylum: Arthropoda
- Class: Insecta
- Order: Lepidoptera
- Family: Crambidae
- Subfamily: Spilomelinae
- Tribe: Agroterini
- Genus: Patania; Moore, 1888

Synonyms
- Loxoscia Warren, 1890; Nagia Walker, 1866; Pleuroptya Meyrick, 1890

= Patania =

Genus of moths

Patania is a genus of moths of the family Crambidae described by Frederic Moore in 1888.

Patania was long considered a junior synonym of Syllepte, but in 2007 it was removed from this synonymy and reinstated as a valid genus. With this action, Patania became the senior synonym to the widely used genus name Pleuroptya, making the latter a junior subjective synonym. Since then, the genus underwent further taxonomic changes, such as the transfer of some species to the reinstated genus Nagiella.

== Species ==
- Patania aedilis (Meyrick, 1887)
- Patania aegrotalis (Zeller, 1852)
- Patania agilis (Meyrick, 1936)
- Patania balteata (Fabricius, 1798)
- Patania batrachina (Meyrick, 1936)
- Patania brevipennis (Inoue, 1982)
- Patania characteristica (Warren, 1896)
- Patania chlorophanta (Butler, 1878)
- Patania concatenalis (Walker, 1866)
- Patania costalis (Moore, 1888)
- Patania crocealis (Duponchel, 1834)
- Patania deficiens (Moore, 1887)
- Patania emmetris (Turner, 1915)
- Patania expictalis (Christoph, 1881)
- Patania ferrugalis (Fabricius, 1781)
- Patania harutai (Inoue, 1955)
- Patania haryoalis (Strand, 1918)
- Patania hemipolialis (Hampson, 1918)
- Patania holophaealis (Hampson, 1912)
- Patania imbecilis (Moore, 1888)
- Patania iopasalis (Walker, 1859)
- Patania jatingaensis Rose & Singh, 1989
- Patania menoni Kirti & Gill, 2007
- Patania mundalis (South in Leech & South, 1901)
- Patania mysisalis (Walker, 1859)
- Patania paleacalis (Guenée, 1854)
- Patania palliventralis (Snellen, 1890)
- Patania pauperalis (Marion, 1954)
- Patania punctimarginalis (Hampson, 1896)
- Patania ruralis (Scopoli, 1763)
- Patania sabinusalis (Walker, 1859)
- Patania scinisalis (Walker, 1859)
- Patania silicalis (Guenée, 1854)
- Patania suisharyella (Strand, 1918)
- Patania symphonodes (Turner, 1913)
- Patania tardalis (Snellen, 1880)
- Patania tchadalis (P. Leraut, 2005)
- Patania tenuis (Warren, 1896)
- Patania ultimalis (Walker, 1859)
- Patania verecunda (Warren, 1896)
- Patania violacealis (Guillermet, 1996)

== Former species ==
- Patania accipitralis (Walker, 1866)
- Patania caletoralis (Walker, 1859)
- Patania fraterna (Moore, 1885)
- Patania orobenalis (Snellen, 1880)
- Patania plagiatalis (Walker, 1859)
- Patania quadrimaculalis (Kollar & Redtenbacher, 1844), now placed in Nagiella
- Patania inferior (Hampson, 1899), now placed in Nagiella
