= Patania expictalis =

Scientific classification
- Domain: Eukaryota
- Kingdom: Animalia
- Phylum: Arthropoda
- Class: Insecta
- Order: Lepidoptera
- Family: Crambidae
- Genus: Patania
- Species: P. expictalis

Binomial name
- Patania expictalis (Christoph, 1881)

Synonyms
- Herpetogramma expictalis Christoph, 1881; Pleuroptya expictalis

Species of moth

Patania expictalis is a species of moth in the family Crambidae. It was described by Hugo Theodor Christoph in 1881. It is found in the Russian Far East (Amur), China and Japan.

The wingspan is 12–13 millimetres (0.47–0.51 in).
