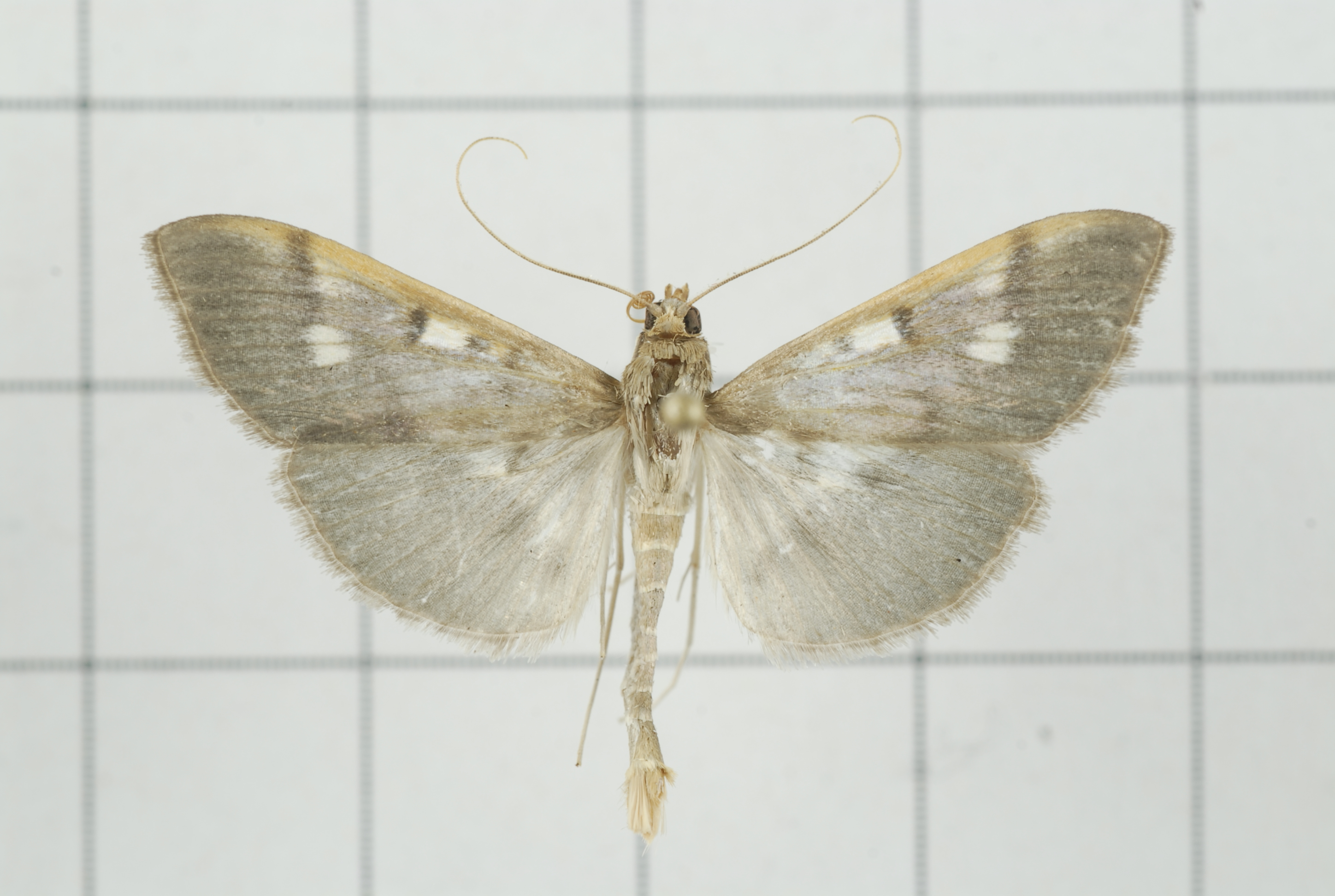

Scientific classification
- Domain: Eukaryota
- Kingdom: Animalia
- Phylum: Arthropoda
- Class: Insecta
- Order: Lepidoptera
- Family: Crambidae
- Genus: Patania
- Species: P. costalis

Binomial name
- Patania costalis (Moore, 1888)

Synonyms
- Botyodes costalis Moore, 1888; Pleuroptya costalis (Moore, 1888)

= Patania costalis =

Species of moth

Patania costalis is a species of moth in the family Crambidae. It was described by Frederic Moore in 1888. It is found in Darjeeling, India.
