= Patania emmetris =

Scientific classification
- Domain: Eukaryota
- Kingdom: Animalia
- Phylum: Arthropoda
- Class: Insecta
- Order: Lepidoptera
- Family: Crambidae
- Genus: Patania
- Species: P. emmetris

Binomial name
- Patania emmetris (Turner, 1915)

Synonyms
- Sylepta emmetris Turner, 1915; Pleuroptya emmetris

Species of moth

Patania emmetris is a species of moth in the family Crambidae. It was described by Turner in 1915. It is found in Australia, where it has been recorded from the Northern Territory.
