= Patania brevipennis =

Scientific classification
- Kingdom: Animalia
- Phylum: Arthropoda
- Class: Insecta
- Order: Lepidoptera
- Family: Crambidae
- Genus: Patania
- Species: P. brevipennis

Binomial name
- Patania brevipennis (Inoue, 1982)

Synonyms
- Pleuroptya brevipennis Inoue, 1982

Species of moth

Patania brevipennis is a species of moth in the family Crambidae. It was described by Inoue in 1982. It is found in Japan (Honshu).
