= Patania hemipolialis =

Scientific classification
- Kingdom: Animalia
- Phylum: Arthropoda
- Class: Insecta
- Order: Lepidoptera
- Family: Crambidae
- Genus: Patania
- Species: P. hemipolialis

Binomial name
- Patania hemipolialis (Hampson, 1918)

Synonyms
- Sylepta hemipolialis Hampson, 1918

Species of moth

Patania hemipolialis is a species of moth in the family Crambidae. It was described by George Hampson in 1918. It is found in Colombia.

The wingspan is about 30 mm. The forewings are yellow, tinged with fulvous up to the postmedial line, the costal area is paler and the terminal area is pale grey-brown. The base is tinged with grey-brown and there is a waved brown antemedial line. The hindwings have a pale yellow basal half, while the terminal half is pale grey-brown.
