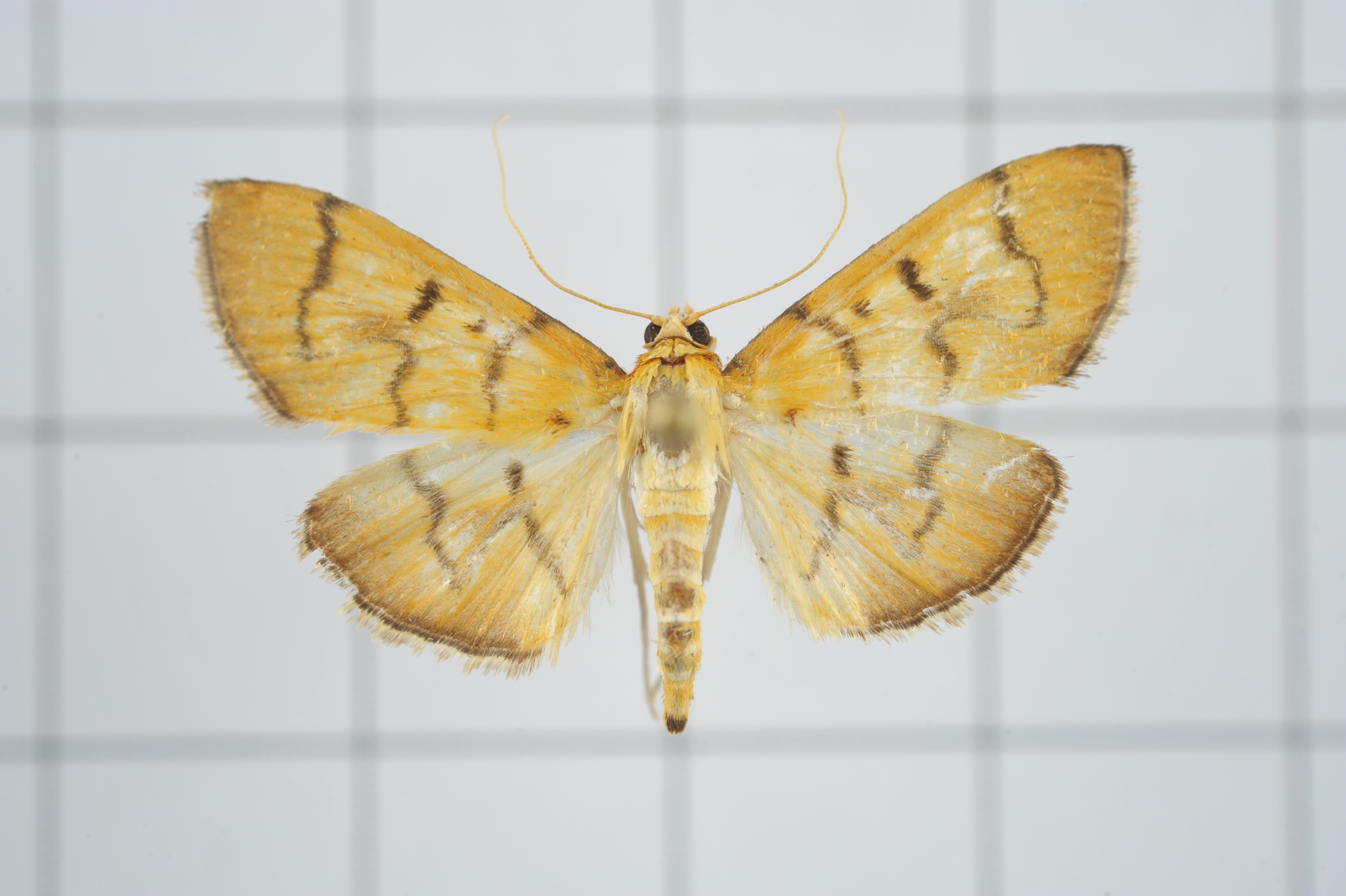

Scientific classification
- Kingdom: Animalia
- Phylum: Arthropoda
- Class: Insecta
- Order: Lepidoptera
- Family: Crambidae
- Genus: Patania
- Species: P. chlorophanta

Binomial name
- Patania chlorophanta (Butler, 1878)

Synonyms
- Botys chlorophanta Butler, 1878; Pleuroptya chlorophanta (Butler, 1878)

= Patania chlorophanta =

Species of moth

Patania chlorophanta is a species of moth in the family Crambidae. It was described by Arthur Gardiner Butler in 1878. It is found on Honshu, Japan.
