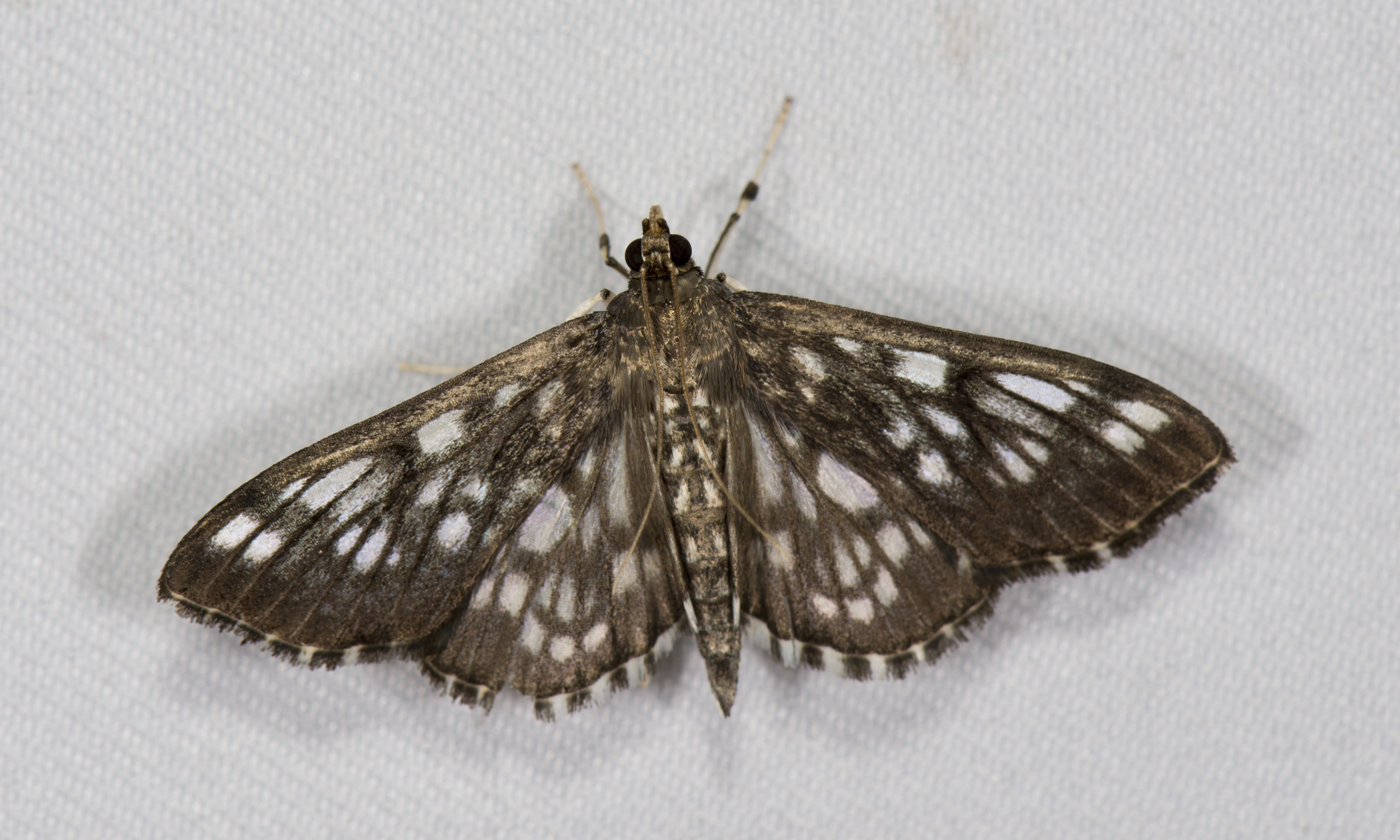

Scientific classification
- Domain: Eukaryota
- Kingdom: Animalia
- Phylum: Arthropoda
- Class: Insecta
- Order: Lepidoptera
- Family: Crambidae
- Genus: Patania
- Species: P. mundalis

Binomial name
- Patania mundalis (South in Leech & South, 1901)

Synonyms
- Pyrausta mundalis South in Leech & South, 1901; Pleuroptya mundalis

= Patania mundalis =

Species of moth

Patania mundalis is a species of moth in the family Crambidae. It was described by South in 1901. It is found in China (Hubei).
