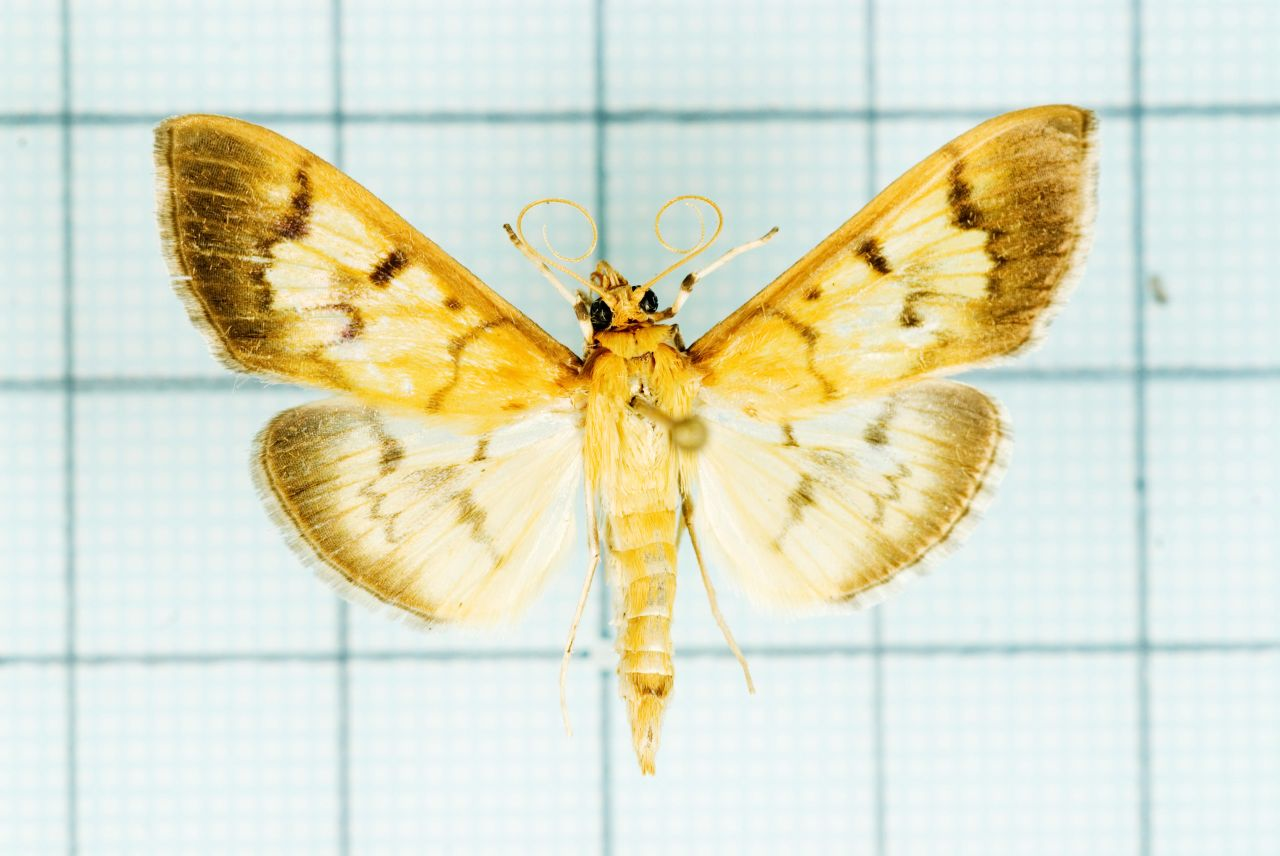

Scientific classification
- Kingdom: Animalia
- Phylum: Arthropoda
- Class: Insecta
- Order: Lepidoptera
- Family: Crambidae
- Genus: Patania
- Species: P. punctimarginalis

Binomial name
- Patania punctimarginalis (Hampson, 1896)

Synonyms
- Pyrausta punctimarginalis Hampson, 1896; Pleuroptya punctimarginalis

= Patania punctimarginalis =

Species of moth

Patania punctimarginalis is a species of species of moth of the family Crambidae. It was described by George Hampson in 1896. It is found in Asia, including India, Indonesia, Japan and Taiwan.
