= Patania suisharyella =

Scientific classification
- Domain: Eukaryota
- Kingdom: Animalia
- Phylum: Arthropoda
- Class: Insecta
- Order: Lepidoptera
- Family: Crambidae
- Genus: Patania
- Species: P. suisharyella

Binomial name
- Patania suisharyella (Strand, 1918)

Synonyms
- Pyrausta suisharyella Strand, 1918

Species of moth

Patania suisharyella is a species of moth in the family Crambidae. It was described by Strand in 1918. It is found in Taiwan.
