= Patania holophaealis =

Scientific classification
- Kingdom: Animalia
- Phylum: Arthropoda
- Class: Insecta
- Order: Lepidoptera
- Family: Crambidae
- Genus: Patania
- Species: P. holophaealis

Binomial name
- Patania holophaealis (Hampson, 1912)

Synonyms
- Sylepta holophaealis Hampson, 1912

Species of moth

Patania holophaealis is a species of moth in the family Crambidae. It was described by George Hampson in 1912. It is found in Paraguay.
