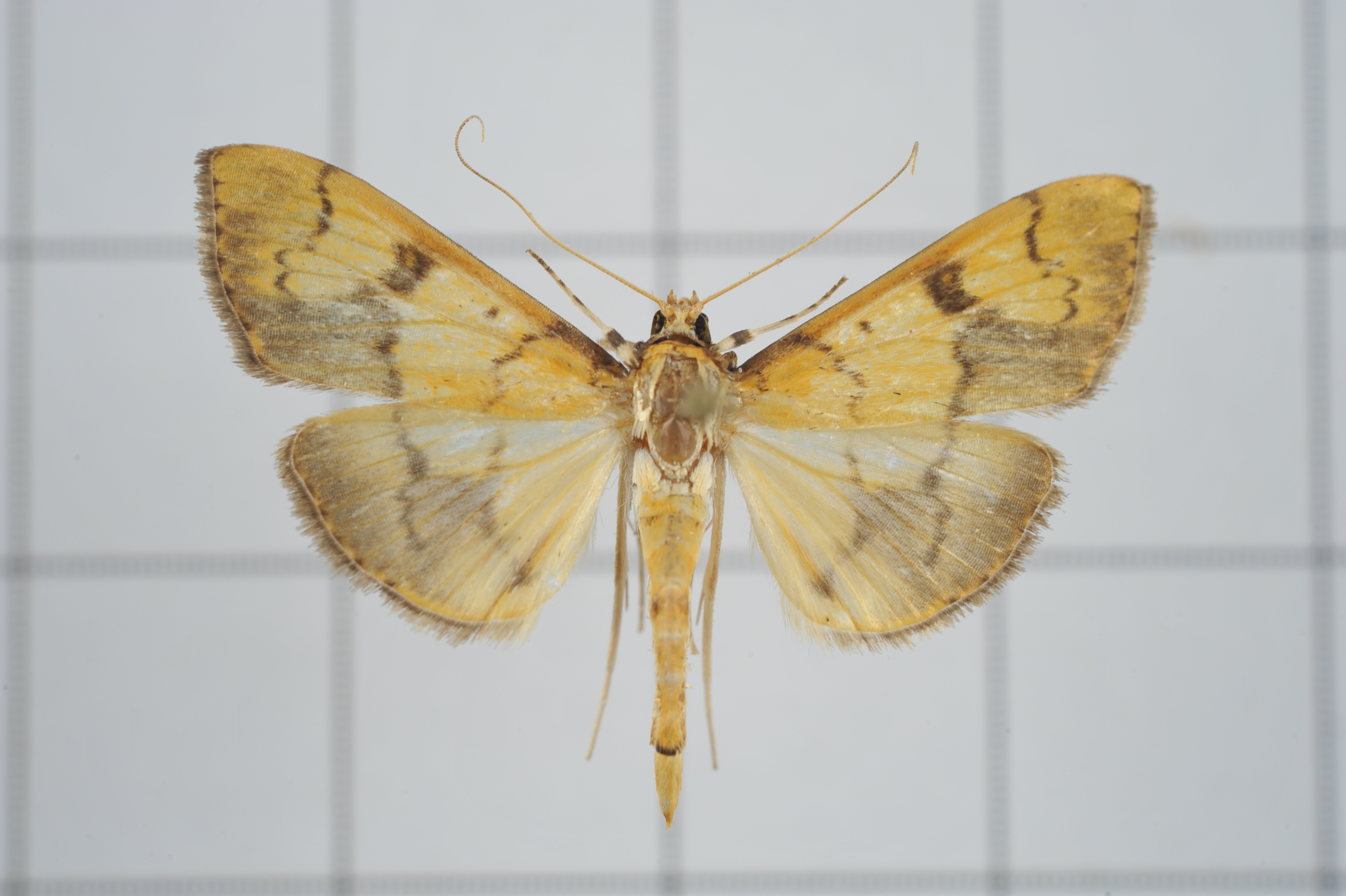

Scientific classification
- Kingdom: Animalia
- Phylum: Arthropoda
- Class: Insecta
- Order: Lepidoptera
- Family: Crambidae
- Genus: Patania
- Species: P. characteristica

Binomial name
- Patania characteristica (Warren, 1896)

Synonyms
- Gadessa characteristica Warren, 1896

= Patania characteristica =

Species of moth

Patania characteristica is a species of moth in the family Crambidae. It was described by Warren in 1896. It is found in India (Meghalaya).
