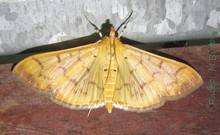

Scientific classification
- Domain: Eukaryota
- Kingdom: Animalia
- Phylum: Arthropoda
- Class: Insecta
- Order: Lepidoptera
- Family: Crambidae
- Genus: Patania
- Species: P. balteata

Binomial name
- Patania balteata (Fabricius, 1798)

Synonyms
- List: Phalaena balteata Fabricius, 1798; Haritala balteata; Pleuroptya balteata; Sylepta aurantiacalis; Pleuroptya aurantiacalis; Botys accipitralis Walker, 1866; Hapalia fraterna Moore, 1886; Botys aurea Butler, 1879; Sylepta evergestialis Strand, 1918; Sylepta irregularis Rothschild, 1915; Pleuroptya balteata africalis P. Leraut, 2005; Botys mysolalis Walker, 1866

= Patania balteata =

Species of moth

Patania balteata is a species of moth of the family Crambidae. It was described by Johan Christian Fabricius in 1798. It is found across southern Europe, Africa and Asia, including Japan, Korea, Réunion, Madagascar, Taiwan, Thailand, Turkey and Ukraine, as well as New South Wales and Queensland in Australia. There is also an old record from Hawaii.

The wingspan is 25–32 millimetres (0.98–1.26 in).

The larvae feed on Anacardium occidentale, Quercus serrata and Castanea species.
