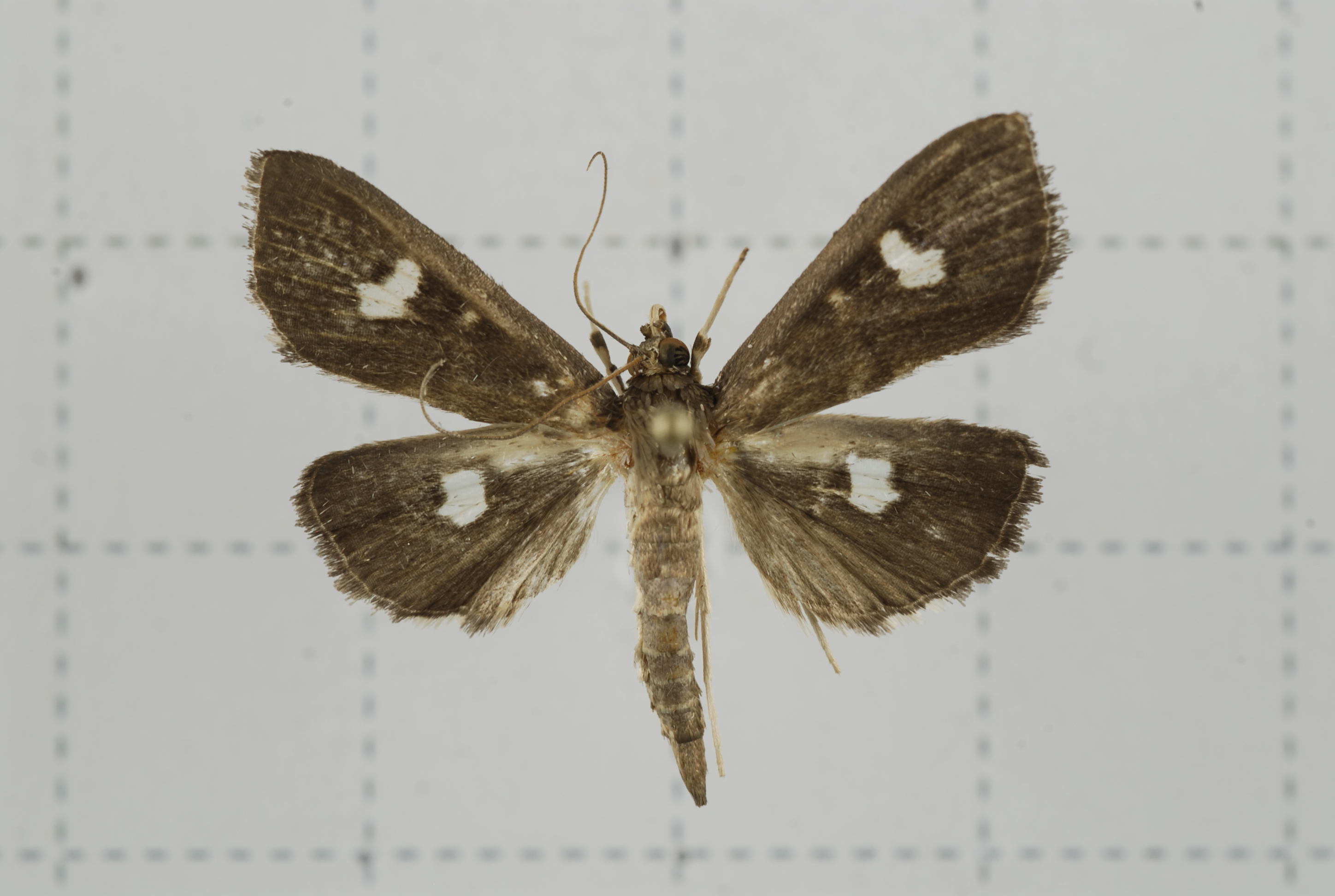
- Nagiella inferior, imago

Scientific classification
- Kingdom: Animalia
- Phylum: Arthropoda
- Class: Insecta
- Order: Lepidoptera
- Family: Crambidae
- Subfamily: Spilomelinae
- Tribe: Agroterini
- Genus: Nagiella; Munroe, 1976

Synonyms
- Nagia Walker, 1866

= Nagiella =

Genus of moths

Nagiella is a genus of moths in the species-rich subfamily Spilomelinae of the family Crambidae.

== Distribution ==
The six species of Nagiella are distributed in East and Southeast Asia as well as the Indian subcontinent.

== Larval foodplants ==
The caterpillars of Nagiella inferior have been recorded on Coffea liberica in the Rubiaceae family, while Rhus chinensis (Anacardiaceae) has been reported as larval foodplant for N. quadrimaculalis.

== Species ==
- Nagiella bispina Lu & Du, 2020
- Nagiella hortulatoides Munroe, 1976
- Nagiella inferior (Hampson, 1899) (= synonym Botys quadrimaculalis Motschultsky, 1861)
- Nagiella occultalis Ullah & Yang in Ullah, Yang, Qiao & Zhang, 2017
- Nagiella quadrimaculalis (Kollar & Redtenbacher, 1844) (= synonym Nagia desmialis Walker, 1866)
- Nagiella tristalis Matsui & Naka in Matsui, Naka & Jinbo, 2021

== Nomenclature & systematics ==
Nagiella was established by Eugene G. Munroe in 1976 as a replacement name for Nagia Walker, 1866, a name that was preoccupied by Nagia Walker, 1858 in the Lepidoptera family Erebidae. The type species, Nagia desmialis Walker, 1865, is now considered a synonym of Nagiella quadrimaculalis (Kollar & Redtenbacher, 1844), which was described earlier and therefore has priority over the younger name. The name quadrimaculalis Motschultsky, 1861 (published in the genus Botys) is a secondary homonym of the previously published name quadrimaculalis Kollar & Redtenbach, 1844 (published in Scopula), and therefore the name inferior Hampson, 1899 (in the genus Sylepta, a misspelling of Syllepte) was proposed as objective replacement name.

In the past, the genus was considered a synonym of Pleuroptya, until in 2017 a taxonomic revision showed that Nagiella is distinct from Pleuroptya, thus reinstating it as a valid genus.

Nagiella is placed in the tribe Agroterini of the subfamily Spilomelinae.
