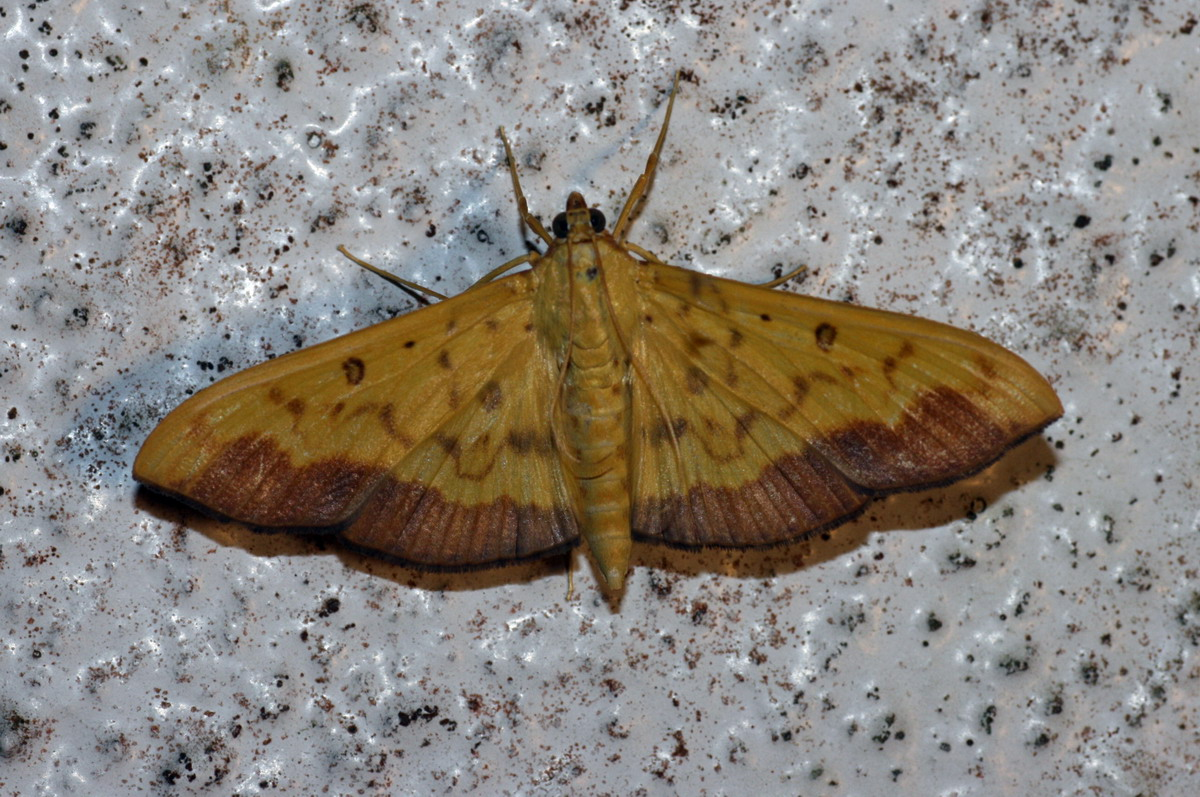
- Botyodes asialis

Scientific classification
- Kingdom: Animalia
- Phylum: Arthropoda
- Class: Insecta
- Order: Lepidoptera
- Family: Crambidae
- Tribe: Margaroniini
- Genus: Botyodes; Guenée, 1854

= Botyodes =

Genus of moths and cats

Botyodes is a genus of moths of the family Crambidae.

== Species ==
- Botyodes andrinalis Viette, 1958
- Botyodes asialis Guenée, 1854
- Botyodes borneensis Munroe, 1960
- Botyodes brachytorna Hampson, 1912
- Botyodes crocopteralis Hampson, 1899
- Botyodes diniasalis (Walker, 1859)
- Botyodes fraterna Moore, 1888
- Botyodes fulviterminalis Hampson, 1898
- Botyodes principalis Leech, 1889
- Botyodes rufalis Hampson, 1896

== Former species ==
- Botyodes flavibasalis Moore, 1867
- Botyodes inconspicua Moore, 1888
