= Endocrossis kenricki =

Scientific classification
- Kingdom: Animalia
- Phylum: Arthropoda
- Class: Insecta
- Order: Lepidoptera
- Family: Crambidae
- Genus: Endocrossis
- Species: E. kenricki

Binomial name
- Endocrossis kenricki C. Swinhoe, 1916

Synonyms
- Botyodes kenricki

Species of moth

Endocrossis kenricki is a species of moth of the family Crambidae. It was described by Charles Swinhoe in 1916 and it is found in Papua New Guinea.

This species has a wingspan of 1.2 inches (30 mm). It is very similar to Endocrossis flavibasalis, but smaller and the wings are shorter and broader. The inner chocolate traverse line of the forewings is represented by three spots.
