= Endocrossis =

Scientific classification
- Kingdom: Animalia
- Phylum: Arthropoda
- Class: Insecta
- Order: Lepidoptera
- Family: Crambidae
- Tribe: Margaroniini
- Genus: Endocrossis; Meyrick, 1889

Genus of moths

Endocrossis is a genus of moths of the family Crambidae.

== Species ==
- Endocrossis caldusalis (Walker, 1859)
- Endocrossis flavibasalis (Moore, 1867)
- Endocrossis kenricki Swinhoe, 1916
- Endocrossis quinquemaculalis Sauber in Semper, 1899

== Former species ==
- Endocrossis fulviterminalis (Hampson, 1898)
