= Botyodes brachytorna =

Scientific classification
- Kingdom: Animalia
- Phylum: Arthropoda
- Class: Insecta
- Order: Lepidoptera
- Family: Crambidae
- Genus: Botyodes
- Species: B. brachytorna

Binomial name
- Botyodes brachytorna Hampson, 1912

Species of moth

Botyodes brachytorna is a moth in the family Crambidae. It was described by George Hampson in 1912. It is found in Papua New Guinea.
