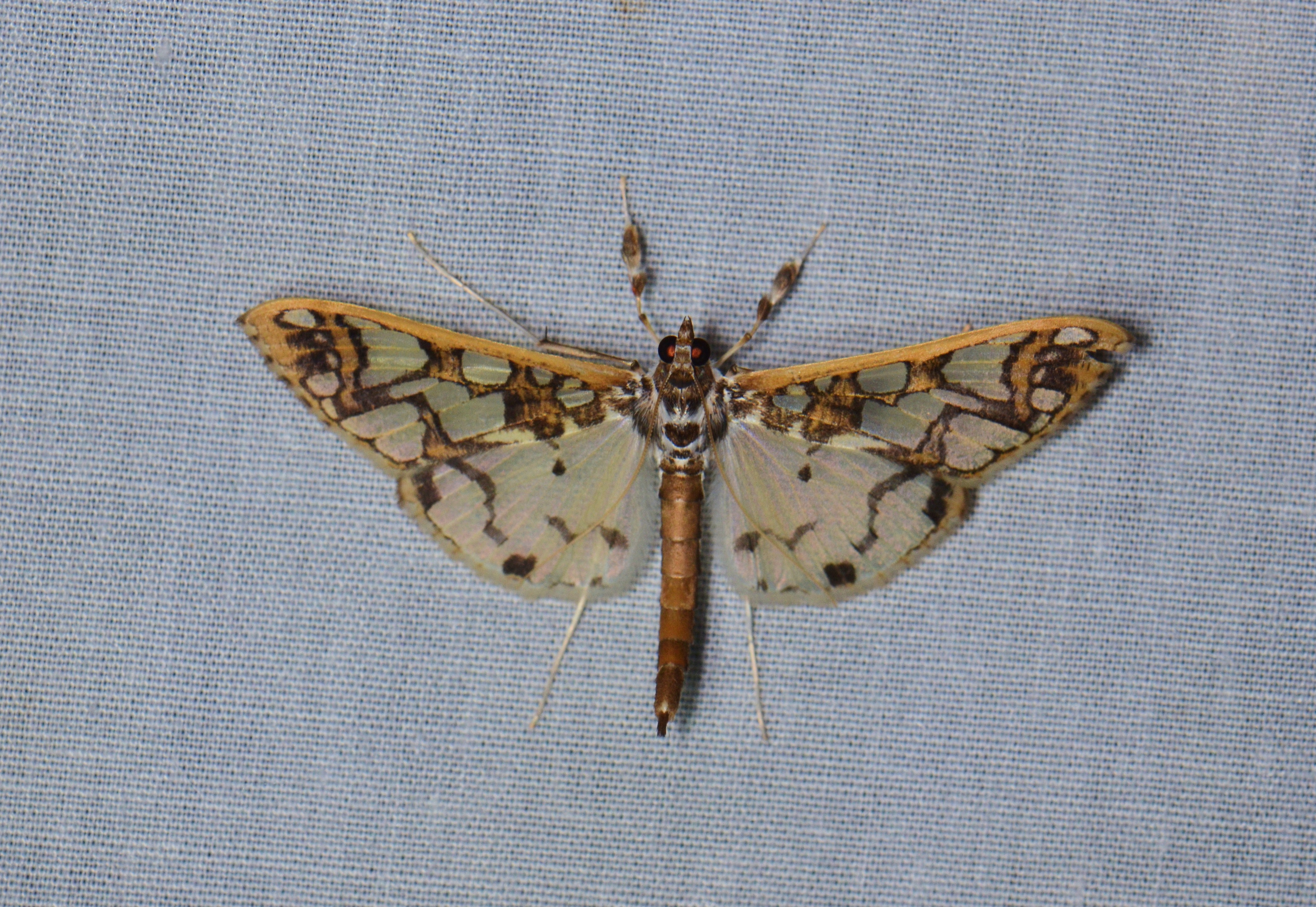

Scientific classification
- Kingdom: Animalia
- Phylum: Arthropoda
- Clade: Pancrustacea
- Class: Insecta
- Order: Lepidoptera
- Family: Crambidae
- Genus: Polythlipta
- Species: P. liquidalis

Binomial name
- Polythlipta liquidalis Leech, 1889

= Polythlipta liquidalis =

Species of moth

Polythlipta liquidalis is a moth in the family Crambidae. It was described by John Henry Leech in 1889. It is found in China and Korea.
