= Polythlipta vagalis =

Scientific classification
- Kingdom: Animalia
- Phylum: Arthropoda
- Clade: Pancrustacea
- Class: Insecta
- Order: Lepidoptera
- Family: Crambidae
- Genus: Polythlipta
- Species: P. vagalis

Binomial name
- Polythlipta vagalis (Walker, 1866)

Synonyms
- Glyphodes vagalis Walker, 1866

Species of moth

Polythlipta vagalis is a moth in the family Crambidae. It was described by Francis Walker in 1866. It is found in Darjeeling, India.
