= Polythlipta albicaudalis =

Scientific classification
- Kingdom: Animalia
- Phylum: Arthropoda
- Clade: Pancrustacea
- Class: Insecta
- Order: Lepidoptera
- Family: Crambidae
- Genus: Polythlipta
- Species: P. albicaudalis

Binomial name
- Polythlipta albicaudalis Snellen, 1880

Species of moth

Polythlipta albicaudalis is a moth in the family Crambidae. It was described by Dutch entomologist Pieter Snellen in 1880. It is found in Indonesia (Sulawesi).
