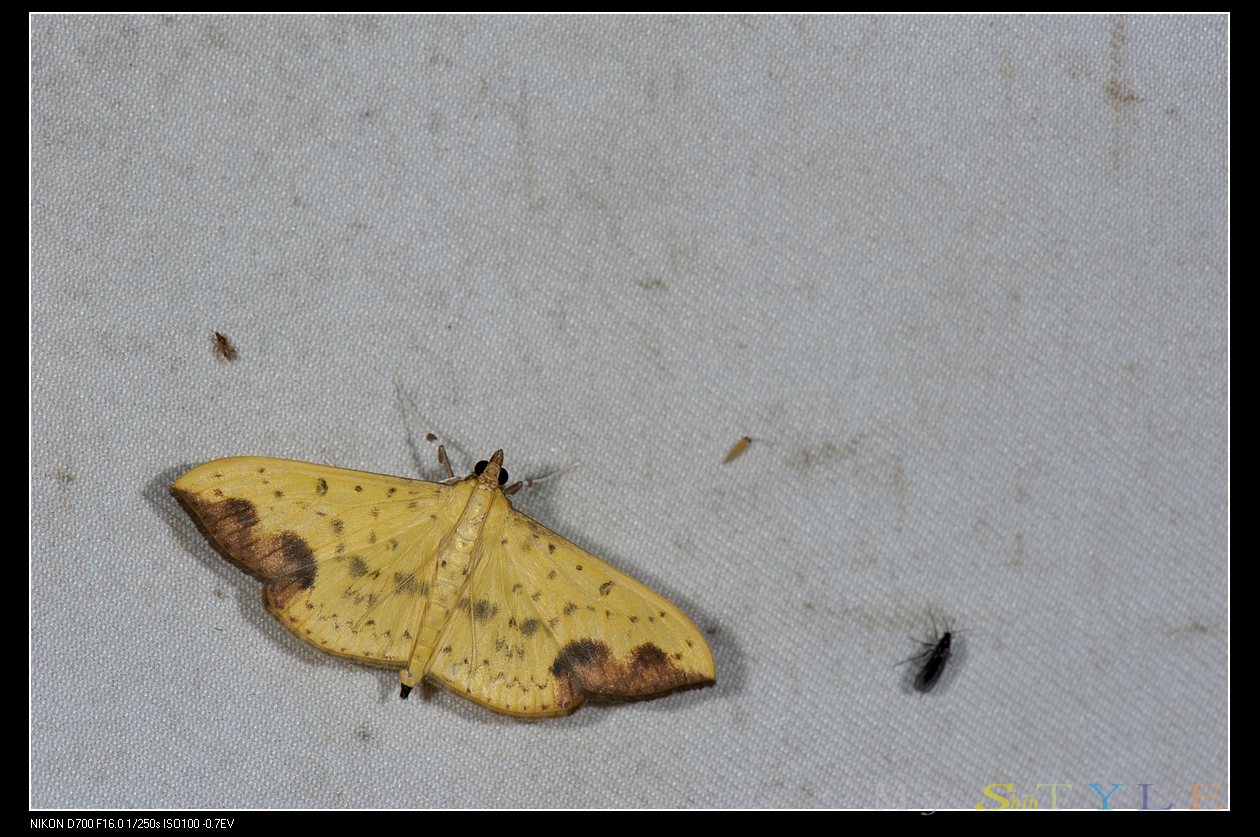

Scientific classification
- Kingdom: Animalia
- Phylum: Arthropoda
- Class: Insecta
- Order: Lepidoptera
- Family: Crambidae
- Genus: Botyodes
- Species: B. principalis

Binomial name
- Botyodes principalis Leech, 1889

Synonyms
- Botyodes maculalis C. Swinhoe, 1894

= Botyodes principalis =

Species of moth

Botyodes principalis is a moth in the family Crambidae. It was described by John Henry Leech in 1889. It is found in China, India, Russia, Taiwan and Japan.
