= Polythlipta rivulalis =

Scientific classification
- Kingdom: Animalia
- Phylum: Arthropoda
- Clade: Pancrustacea
- Class: Insecta
- Order: Lepidoptera
- Family: Crambidae
- Genus: Polythlipta
- Species: P. rivulalis

Binomial name
- Polythlipta rivulalis Snellen, 1890

Species of moth

Polythlipta rivulalis is a moth in the family Crambidae. It was described by Snellen in 1890. It is found in Indonesia (Sumatra).
