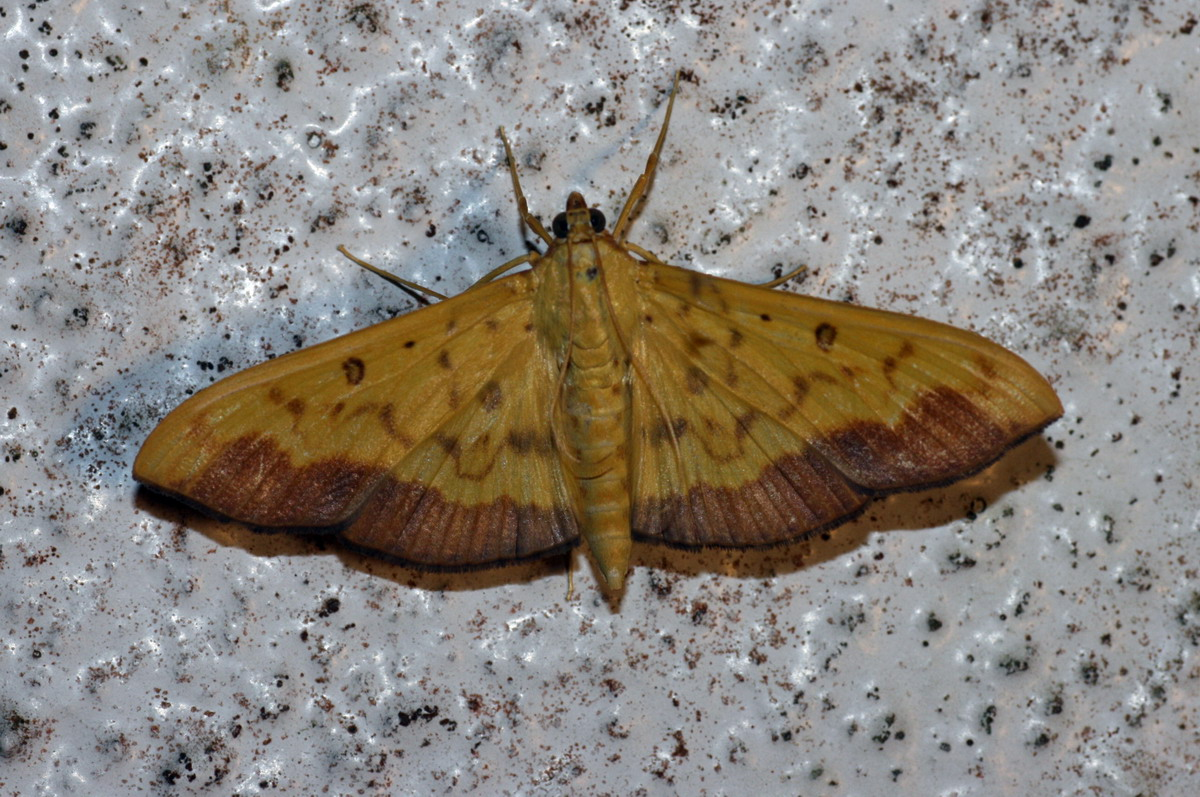

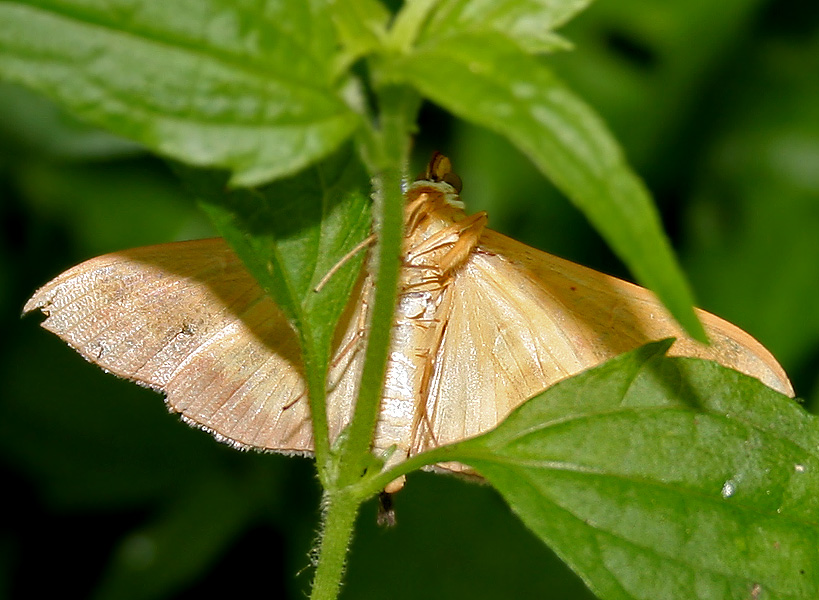

Scientific classification
- Kingdom: Animalia
- Phylum: Arthropoda
- Clade: Pancrustacea
- Class: Insecta
- Order: Lepidoptera
- Family: Crambidae
- Genus: Botyodes
- Species: B. asialis

Binomial name
- Botyodes asialis Guenée, 1854

Synonyms
- Botyodes liliputalis Strand, 1913; Botys crysotalis Guenée, 1854

= Botyodes asialis =

Species of moth

Botyodes asialis is a species of moth of the family Crambidae described by Achille Guenée in 1854. It is known from Africa, through Asia to the Pacific, including Fiji, Hong Kong, Réunion, Thailand, India, Siam, Sri Lanka, the Philippines, New Guinea, Samoa, Malay Peninsula and Queensland.

The larvae have been recorded feeding on Populus species.
