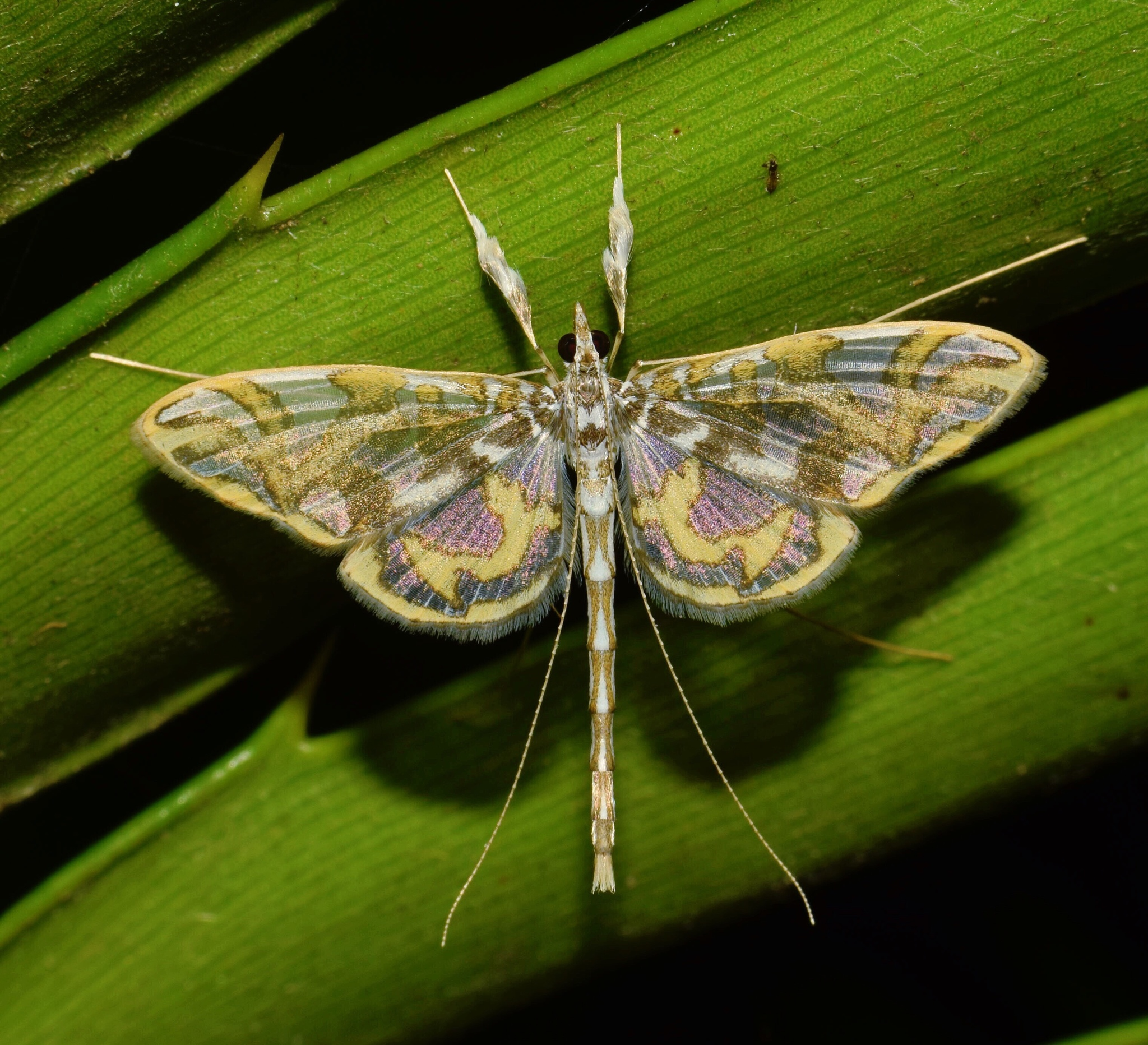
- Polythlipta annulifera

Scientific classification
- Kingdom: Animalia
- Phylum: Arthropoda
- Clade: Pancrustacea
- Class: Insecta
- Order: Lepidoptera
- Family: Crambidae
- Subfamily: Spilomelinae
- Genus: Polythlipta; Lederer, 1863

= Polythlipta =

Genus of moths

Polythlipta is a genus of moths of the family Crambidae.

== Species ==
- Polythlipta albicaudalis Snellen, 1880
- Polythlipta annulifera Walker, 1866
- Polythlipta camptozona Hampson, 1910
- Polythlipta cerealis Lederer, 1863
- Polythlipta conjunctalis Caradja, 1925
- Polythlipta distinguenda Grünberg, 1910
- Polythlipta distorta Moore, 1888
- Polythlipta divaricata Moore, 1885
- Polythlipta euroalis Swinhoe, 1889
- Polythlipta guttiferalis Hampson, 1909
- Polythlipta inconspicua Moore, 1888
- Polythlipta liquidalis Leech, 1889
- Polythlipta macralis Lederer, 1863
- Polythlipta maculalis South in Leech & South, 1901
- Polythlipta nodiferalis Walker, 1866
- Polythlipta ossealis Lederer, 1863
- Polythlipta peragrata Moore, 1888
- Polythlipta rivulalis Snellen, 1890
- Polythlipta vagalis Walker, 1866
