= Polythlipta maculalis =

Scientific classification
- Kingdom: Animalia
- Phylum: Arthropoda
- Clade: Pancrustacea
- Class: Insecta
- Order: Lepidoptera
- Family: Crambidae
- Genus: Polythlipta
- Species: P. maculalis

Binomial name
- Polythlipta maculalis South in Leech & South, 1901

Species of moth

Polythlipta maculalis is a moth in the family Crambidae. It was described by South in 1901. It is found in China.
