= Polythlipta conjunctalis =

Scientific classification
- Kingdom: Animalia
- Phylum: Arthropoda
- Clade: Pancrustacea
- Class: Insecta
- Order: Lepidoptera
- Family: Crambidae
- Genus: Polythlipta
- Species: P. conjunctalis

Binomial name
- Polythlipta conjunctalis Caradja, 1925

Species of moth

Polythlipta conjunctalis is a moth in the family Crambidae. It was described by Aristide Caradja in 1925. It is found in China.
