= Polythlipta nodiferalis =

Scientific classification
- Kingdom: Animalia
- Phylum: Arthropoda
- Clade: Pancrustacea
- Class: Insecta
- Order: Lepidoptera
- Family: Crambidae
- Genus: Polythlipta
- Species: P. nodiferalis

Binomial name
- Polythlipta nodiferalis Walker, 1866

Species of moth

Polythlipta nodiferalis is a moth in the family Crambidae. It was described by Francis Walker in 1866. It is found on Seram in Indonesia.
