= Polythlipta ossealis =

Scientific classification
- Kingdom: Animalia
- Phylum: Arthropoda
- Clade: Pancrustacea
- Class: Insecta
- Order: Lepidoptera
- Family: Crambidae
- Genus: Polythlipta
- Species: P. ossealis

Binomial name
- Polythlipta ossealis Lederer, 1863

Synonyms
- Polythlipta osseatalis Lederer, 1863

Species of moth

Polythlipta ossealis is a moth in the family Crambidae. It was described by Julius Lederer in 1863. It is found on Indonesia's Ambon Island.
