= Polythlipta distinguenda =

Scientific classification
- Kingdom: Animalia
- Phylum: Arthropoda
- Clade: Pancrustacea
- Class: Insecta
- Order: Lepidoptera
- Family: Crambidae
- Genus: Polythlipta
- Species: P. distinguenda

Binomial name
- Polythlipta distinguenda Grünberg, 1910

Species of moth

Polythlipta distinguenda is a moth in the family Crambidae. It was described by Karl Grünberg in 1910. It is found in the Democratic Republic of the Congo (the former Katanga Province) and Uganda.
