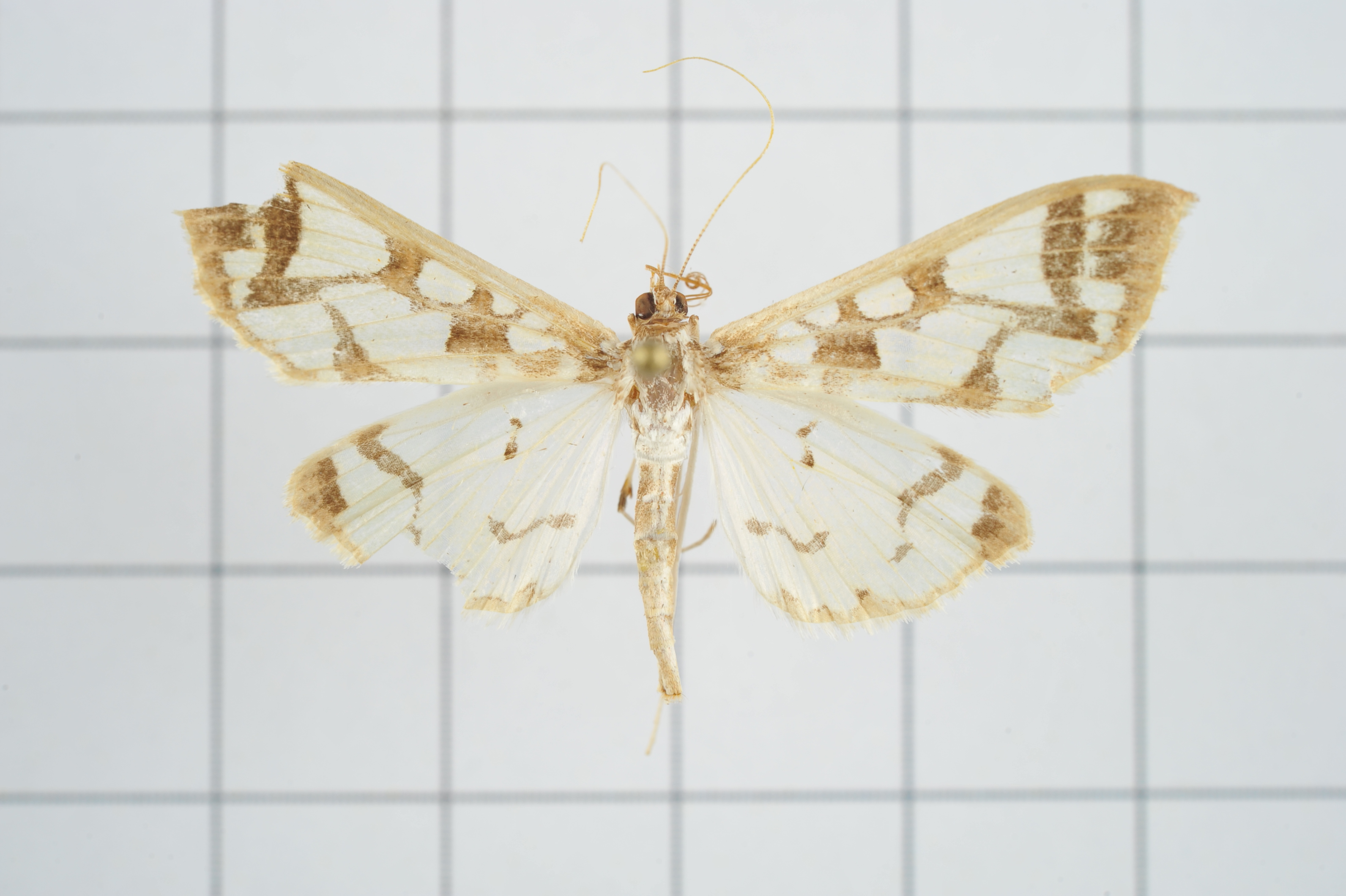

Scientific classification
- Kingdom: Animalia
- Phylum: Arthropoda
- Clade: Pancrustacea
- Class: Insecta
- Order: Lepidoptera
- Family: Crambidae
- Genus: Polythlipta
- Species: P. macralis

Binomial name
- Polythlipta macralis Lederer, 1863

Synonyms
- Polythlipta maceratalis Lederer, 1863

= Polythlipta macralis =

Species of moth

Polythlipta macralis is a moth in the family Crambidae. It was described by Julius Lederer in 1863. It is found on Indonesia's Ambon Island, Papua New Guinea and Taiwan.
