= Polythlipta distorta =

Scientific classification
- Kingdom: Animalia
- Phylum: Arthropoda
- Clade: Pancrustacea
- Class: Insecta
- Order: Lepidoptera
- Family: Crambidae
- Genus: Polythlipta
- Species: P. distorta

Binomial name
- Polythlipta distorta Moore, 1888

Species of moth

Polythlipta distorta is a moth in the family Crambidae. It was described by Frederic Moore in 1888. It is found in Darjeeling, India.
