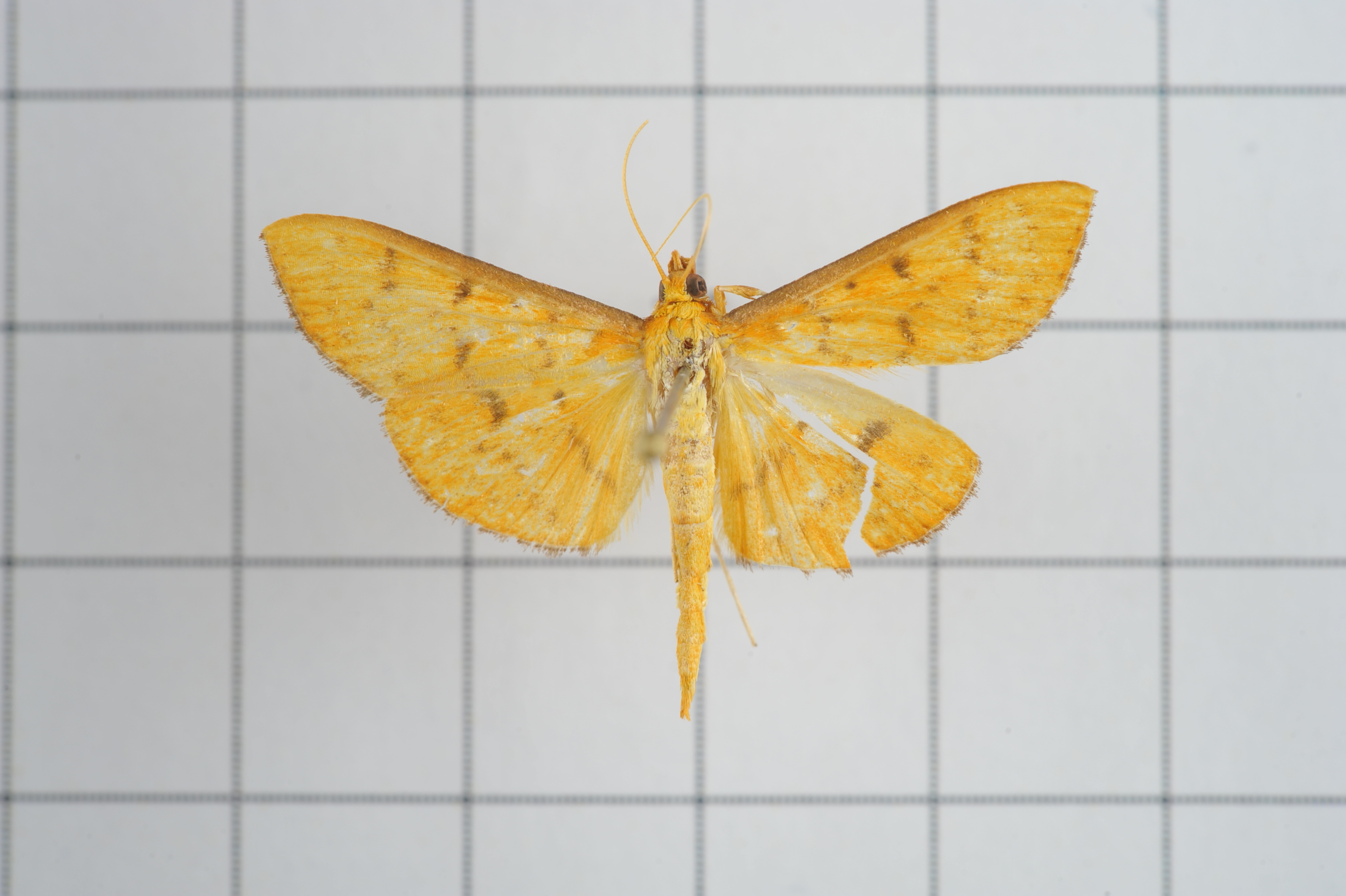

Scientific classification
- Kingdom: Animalia
- Phylum: Arthropoda
- Class: Insecta
- Order: Lepidoptera
- Family: Crambidae
- Genus: Endocrossis
- Species: E. caldusalis

Binomial name
- Endocrossis caldusalis (Walker, 1859)

Synonyms
- Botys caldusalis Walker, 1859

= Endocrossis caldusalis =

Species of moth

Endocrossis caldusalis is a moth in the family Crambidae. It was described by Francis Walker in 1859. It is found in India, Cambodia and Taiwan.
