= Polythlipta euroalis =

Scientific classification
- Kingdom: Animalia
- Phylum: Arthropoda
- Clade: Pancrustacea
- Class: Insecta
- Order: Lepidoptera
- Family: Crambidae
- Genus: Polythlipta
- Species: P. euroalis

Binomial name
- Polythlipta euroalis (C. Swinhoe, 1889)

Synonyms
- Nausinoe euroalis C. Swinhoe, 1889

Species of moth

Polythlipta euroalis is a moth in the family Crambidae. It was described by Charles Swinhoe in 1889. It is found in north-eastern India, as well as in northern Australia.
