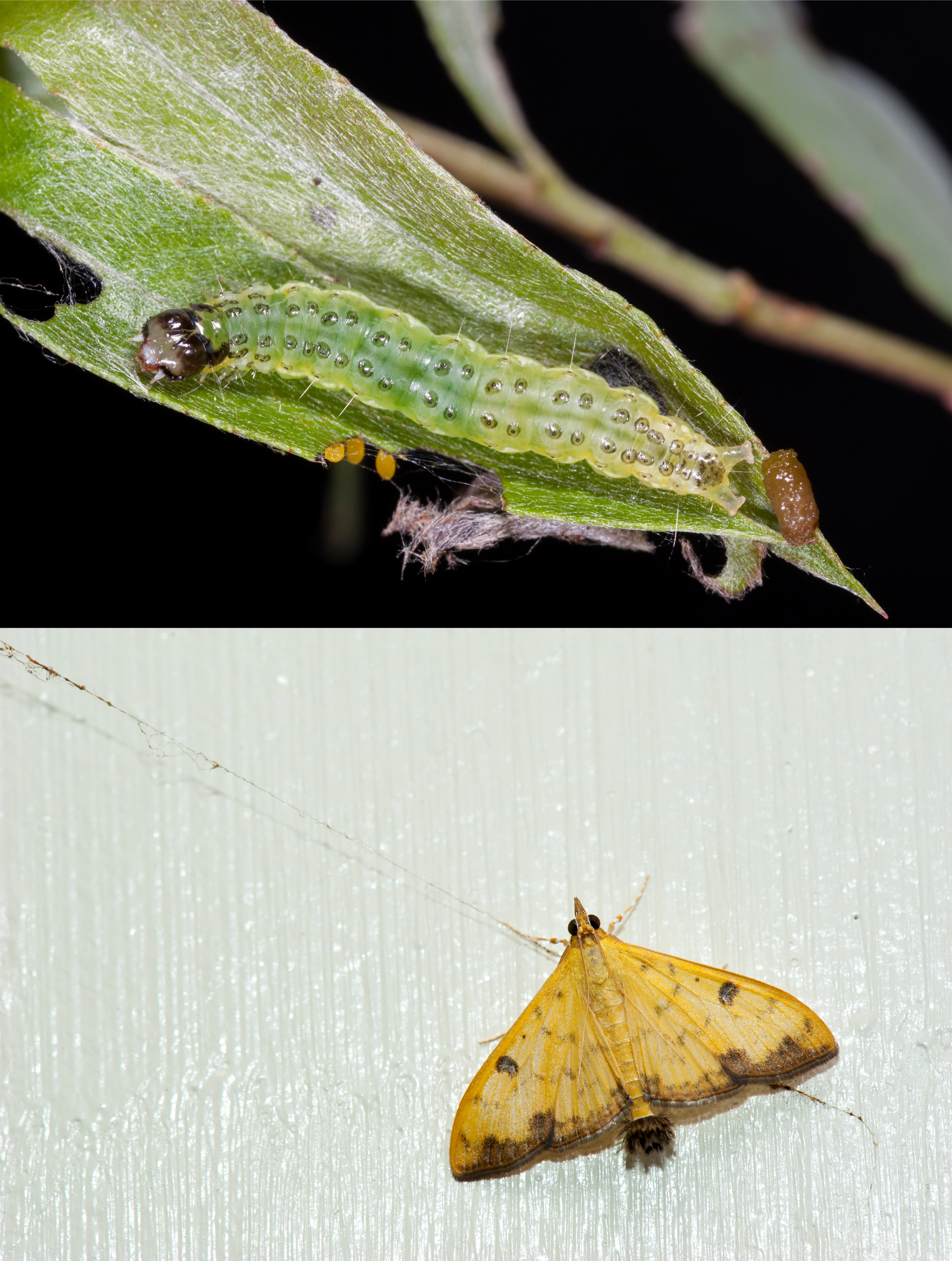

Scientific classification
- Kingdom: Animalia
- Phylum: Arthropoda
- Clade: Pancrustacea
- Class: Insecta
- Order: Lepidoptera
- Family: Crambidae
- Genus: Botyodes
- Species: B. diniasalis

Binomial name
- Botyodes diniasalis (Walker, 1859)

Synonyms
- Botys diniasalis Walker, 1859; Pyrausta diniasalis capnosalis Caradja, 1925; Sylepta kosemponis Strand, 1918

= Botyodes diniasalis =

Species of moth

Botyodes diniasalis is a species of moth in the family Crambidae. It is found on the Canary Islands, as well as in Taiwan, China, Japan and Russia. It has also been recorded from Mali, South Africa and the Himalaya.

The wingspan is about 30 mm. Adults are yellow, rather slender and white beneath. The wings have brownish lines and the forewings have ferruginous marginal band and brown marks. The hindwings are ferruginous at the tips.

The larvae are a poplar leaf pest.
