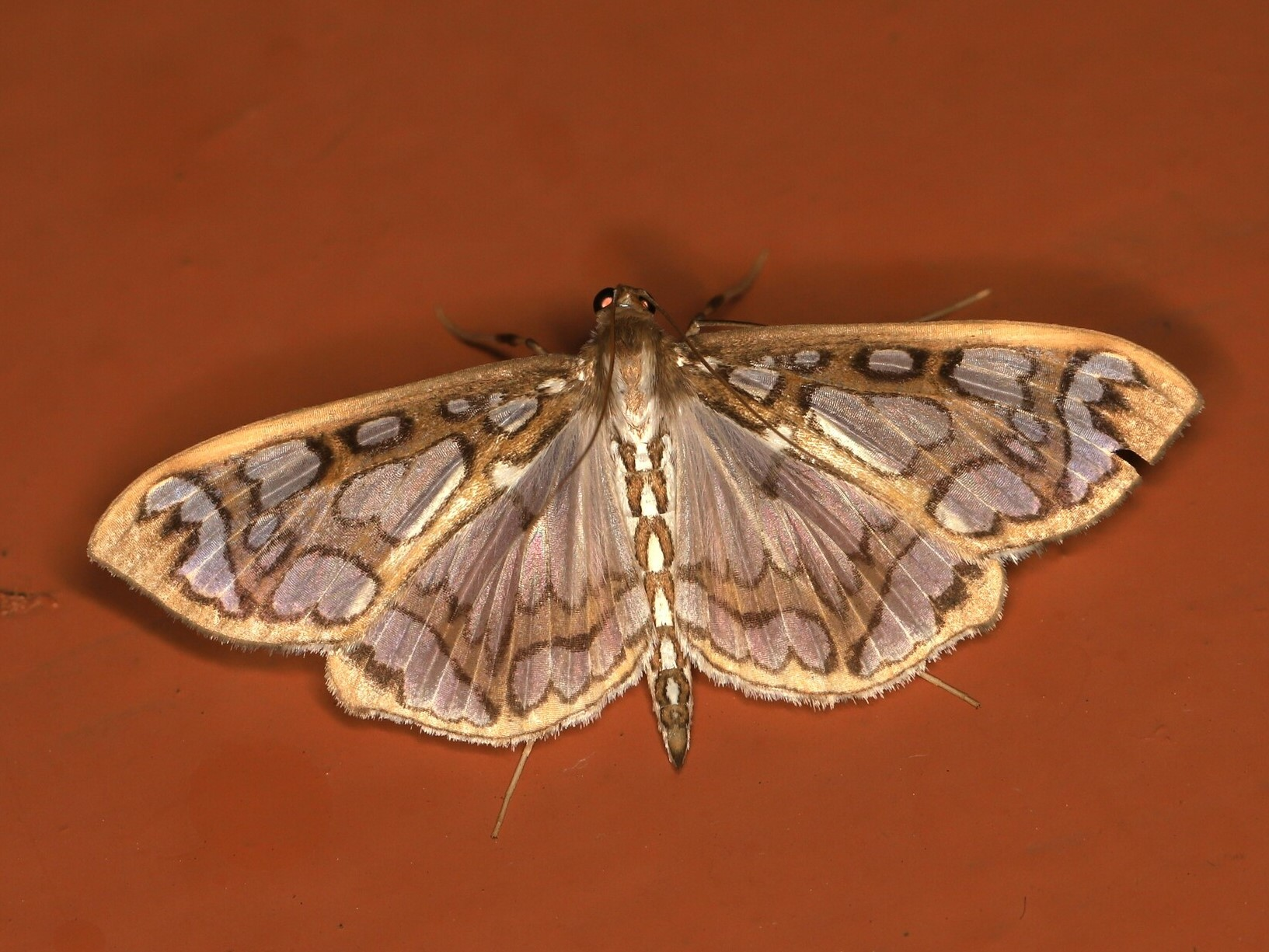

Scientific classification
- Kingdom: Animalia
- Phylum: Arthropoda
- Clade: Pancrustacea
- Class: Insecta
- Order: Lepidoptera
- Family: Crambidae
- Genus: Polythlipta
- Species: P. camptozona

Binomial name
- Polythlipta camptozona Hampson, 1910

= Polythlipta camptozona =

Species of moth

Polythlipta camptozona is a species of moth in the family Crambidae. It is found in Central Africa (Rwanda, Uganda, Zambia and Zimbabwe).
