= Botyodes andrinalis =

Scientific classification
- Kingdom: Animalia
- Phylum: Arthropoda
- Class: Insecta
- Order: Lepidoptera
- Family: Crambidae
- Genus: Botyodes
- Species: B. andrinalis

Binomial name
- Botyodes andrinalis Viette, 1958

Species of moth

Botyodes andrinalis is a species of moth of the family Crambidae described by Pierre Viette in 1958. It is found in Madagascar.

Its wingspan is 48–55 mm, with a length of the forewings of 23–27 mm. The males are smaller than the females. The holotype had been collected near Périnet (Analamazoatra Reserve).
