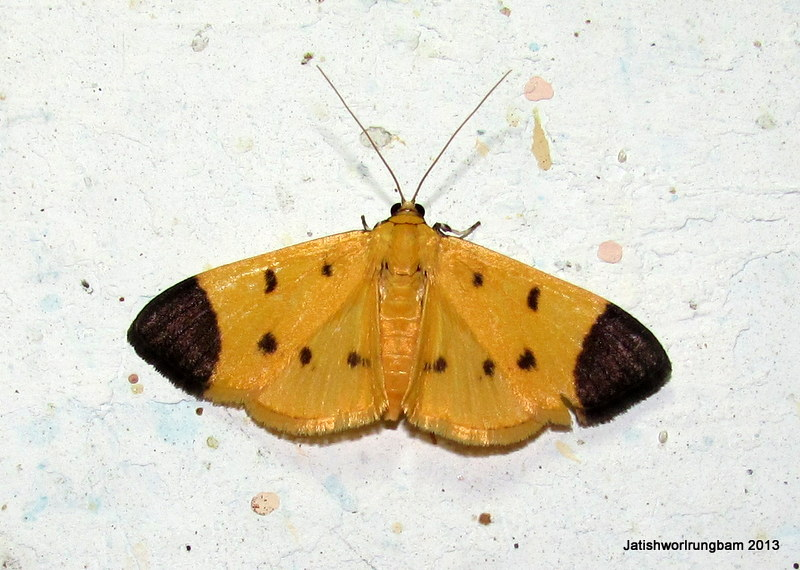

Scientific classification
- Kingdom: Animalia
- Phylum: Arthropoda
- Class: Insecta
- Order: Lepidoptera
- Family: Crambidae
- Genus: Botyodes
- Species: B. crocopteralis

Binomial name
- Botyodes crocopteralis Hampson, 1899

= Botyodes crocopteralis =

Species of moth

Botyodes crocopteralis is a moth in the family Crambidae. It was described by George Hampson in 1899. It is found in Sikkim, India.
