= Polythlipta guttiferalis =

Scientific classification
- Kingdom: Animalia
- Phylum: Arthropoda
- Clade: Pancrustacea
- Class: Insecta
- Order: Lepidoptera
- Family: Crambidae
- Genus: Polythlipta
- Species: P. guttiferalis

Binomial name
- Polythlipta guttiferalis Hampson, 1909

Species of moth

Polythlipta guttiferalis is a moth in the family Crambidae. It was described by George Hampson in 1909. It is found in Uganda.
