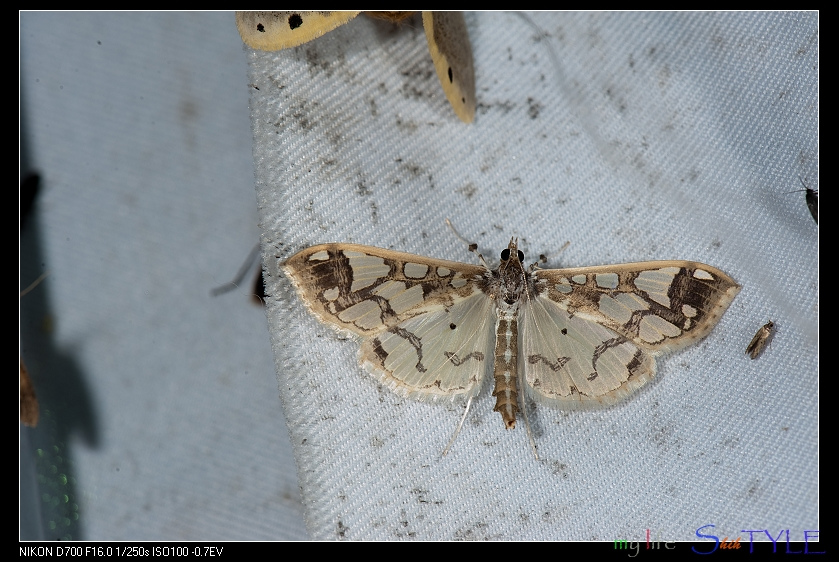

Scientific classification
- Kingdom: Animalia
- Phylum: Arthropoda
- Clade: Pancrustacea
- Class: Insecta
- Order: Lepidoptera
- Family: Crambidae
- Genus: Polythlipta
- Species: P. divaricata

Binomial name
- Polythlipta divaricata Moore, 1885

= Polythlipta divaricata =

Species of moth

Polythlipta divaricata is a moth in the family Crambidae. It was described by Frederic Moore in 1885. It is found in Sri Lanka, China, Taiwan and Papua New Guinea.
