= Endocrossis quinquemaculalis =

Scientific classification
- Kingdom: Animalia
- Phylum: Arthropoda
- Class: Insecta
- Order: Lepidoptera
- Family: Crambidae
- Genus: Endocrossis
- Species: E. quinquemaculalis

Binomial name
- Endocrossis quinquemaculalis Sauber in Semper, 1899

Species of moth

Endocrossis quinquemaculalis is a moth in the family Crambidae. It was described by Sauber in 1899. It is found on Luzon in the Philippines.
