= Botyodes fraterna =

Scientific classification
- Kingdom: Animalia
- Phylum: Arthropoda
- Class: Insecta
- Order: Lepidoptera
- Family: Crambidae
- Genus: Botyodes
- Species: B. fraterna

Binomial name
- Botyodes fraterna Moore, 1888

Species of moth

Botyodes fraterna is a moth in the family Crambidae. It was described by Frederic Moore in 1888. It is found in Darjeeling, India.
