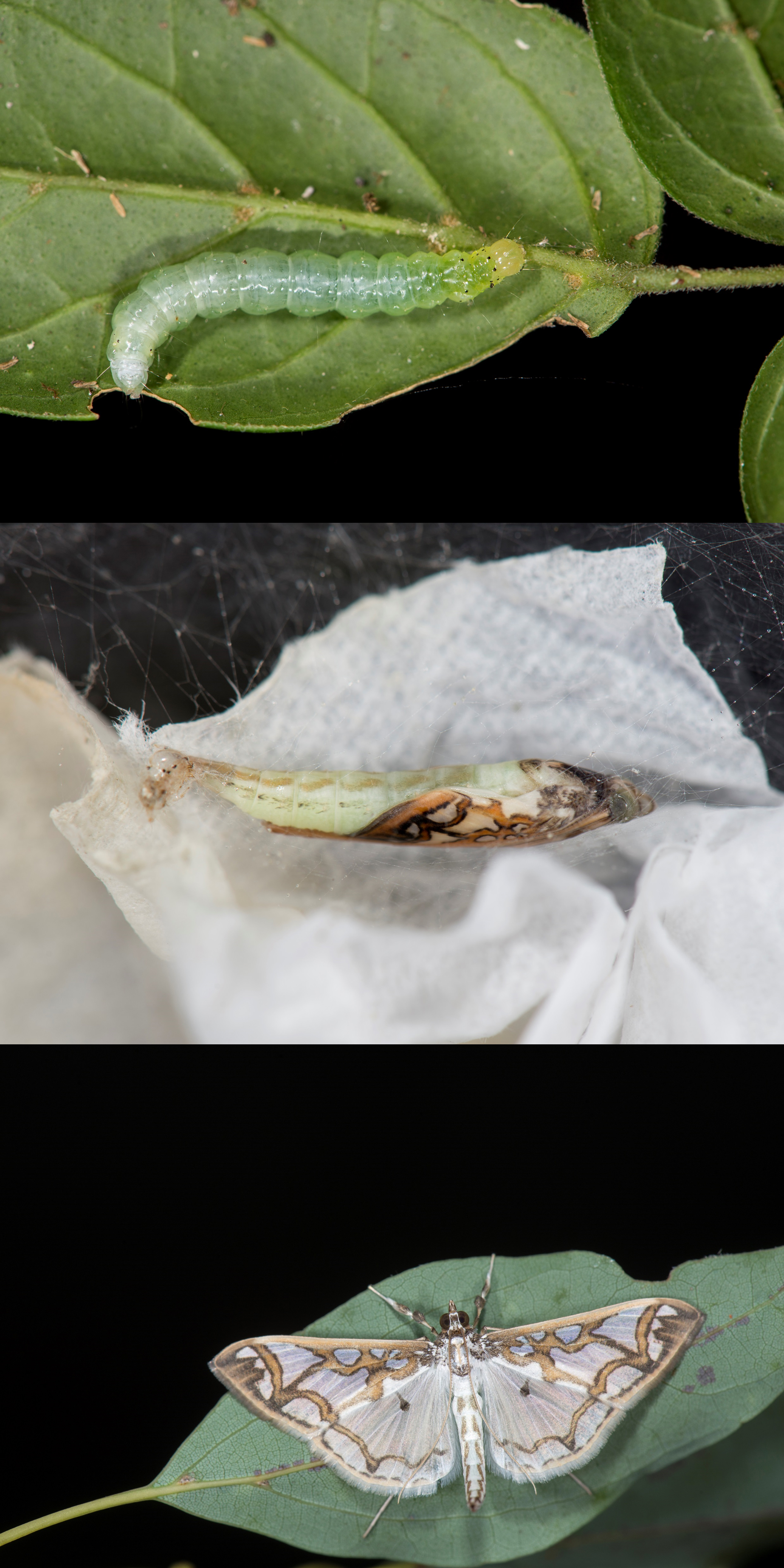

Scientific classification
- Kingdom: Animalia
- Phylum: Arthropoda
- Clade: Pancrustacea
- Class: Insecta
- Order: Lepidoptera
- Family: Crambidae
- Genus: Polythlipta
- Species: P. cerealis

Binomial name
- Polythlipta cerealis Lederer, 1863

= Polythlipta cerealis =

Species of moth

Polythlipta cerealis is a moth in the family Crambidae. It was described by Julius Lederer in 1863. It is found in India.It has been recorded in Sikkim, India.
