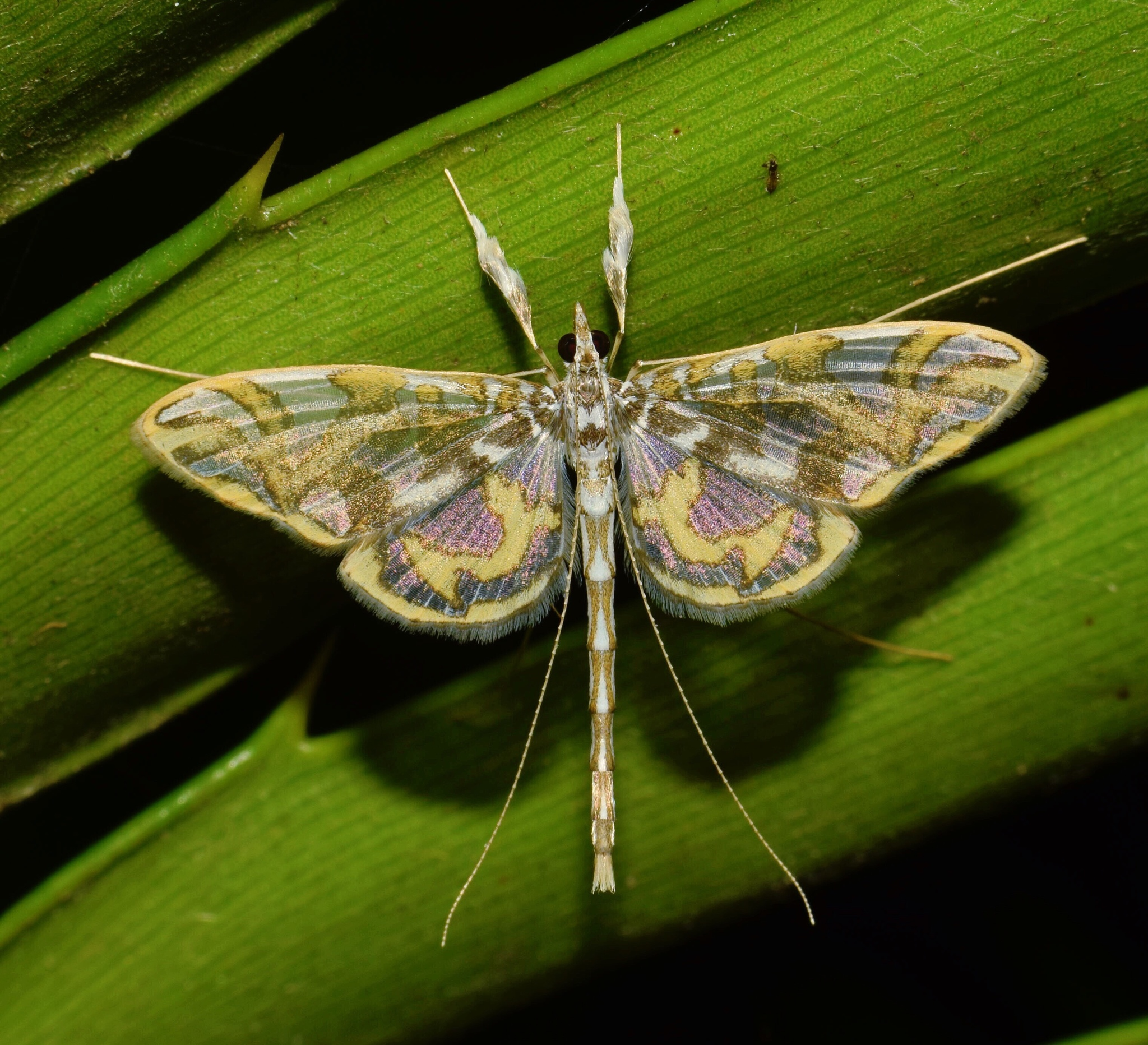
- Polythlipta annulifera in South Africa

Scientific classification
- Kingdom: Animalia
- Phylum: Arthropoda
- Clade: Pancrustacea
- Class: Insecta
- Order: Lepidoptera
- Family: Crambidae
- Genus: Polythlipta
- Species: P. annulifera

Binomial name
- Polythlipta annulifera (Walker, 1866)

Synonyms
- Polythlipta malgassalis Viette, 1958; Phalangiodes annulifera Walker, 1898

= Polythlipta annulifera =

Species of moth

Polythlipta annulifera is a moth of the family Crambidae. It is found in South Africa and in Madagascar.
