= Botyodes borneensis =

Scientific classification
- Kingdom: Animalia
- Phylum: Arthropoda
- Class: Insecta
- Order: Lepidoptera
- Family: Crambidae
- Genus: Botyodes
- Species: B. borneensis

Binomial name
- Botyodes borneensis Munroe, 1960

Species of moth

Botyodes borneensis is a moth in the family Crambidae. It was described by Eugene G. Munroe in 1960. It is found on Borneo.
