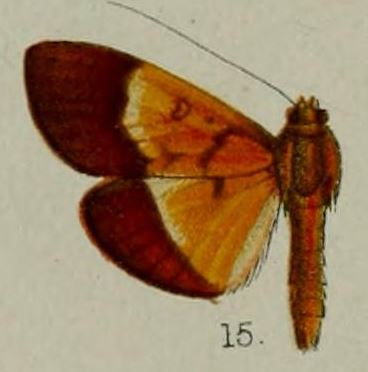

Scientific classification
- Kingdom: Animalia
- Phylum: Arthropoda
- Class: Insecta
- Order: Lepidoptera
- Family: Crambidae
- Genus: Botyodes
- Species: B. fulviterminalis

Binomial name
- Botyodes fulviterminalis Hampson, 1899

= Botyodes fulviterminalis =

Species of moth

Botyodes fulviterminalis is a moth in the family Crambidae. It was described by George Hampson in 1899. It is found in New Guinea.
