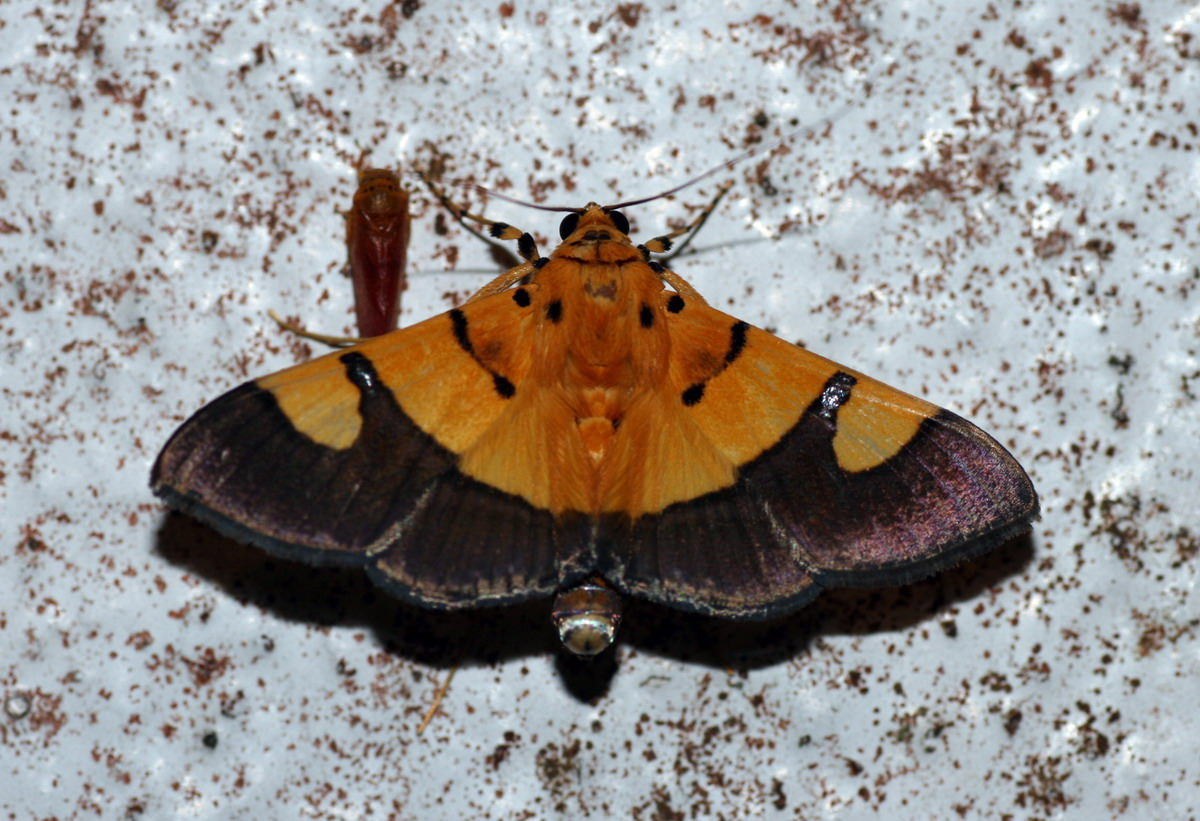

Scientific classification
- Kingdom: Animalia
- Phylum: Arthropoda
- Class: Insecta
- Order: Lepidoptera
- Family: Crambidae
- Genus: Endocrossis
- Species: E. flavibasalis

Binomial name
- Endocrossis flavibasalis (Moore, 1867)

Synonyms
- Botyodes flavibasalis Moore, 1867; Botyodes flavibasalis interruptalis Caradja in Caradja & Meyrick, 1933

= Endocrossis flavibasalis =

Species of moth

Endocrossis flavibasalis is a species of moth of the family Crambidae. It is found in India (the eastern Himalayas, Assam), China, Burma, Sumatra and New Guinea.

== Subspecies ==
- Endocrossis flavibasalis flavibasalis
- Endocrossis flavibasalis interruptalis (Caradja in Caradja & Meyrick, 1933) (China: Guangdong)
