= Anania =

Anania may refer to:

== Genus ==
- Anania (moth), a genus of moths in the family Crambidae
- Anania (foraminifera), a genus of shelled protists in the family Ananiidae

== People with the given name ==
- Anania (internet personality), American internet personality
- Anania Dimitrova (born 2010), Bulgarian gymnast
- Anania Mokatsi 10th century Catholicos of the Armenian Apostolic Church
- Anania Narekatsi 10th century Armenian theologian
- Anania Shirakatsi (610–685) Armenian mathematician, astronomer and geographer

== People with surname ==
- Bartolomeu Anania (1921–2011), Romanian bishop, translator, writer and poet
- George Anania (1941–2013), Romanian writer
- Giovanni Lorenzo d'Anania (1545-1609), Italian geographer and theologian
- Jay N. Anania (born 1959), American diplomat
- Luca Anania (born 1980), Italian football goalkeeper
- Mary Elizabeth Anania Edwards (1949–2010), American attorney
- Michael Anania (born 1939), American poet, novelist, and essayist

== See also ==
- Ananias (disambiguation)
