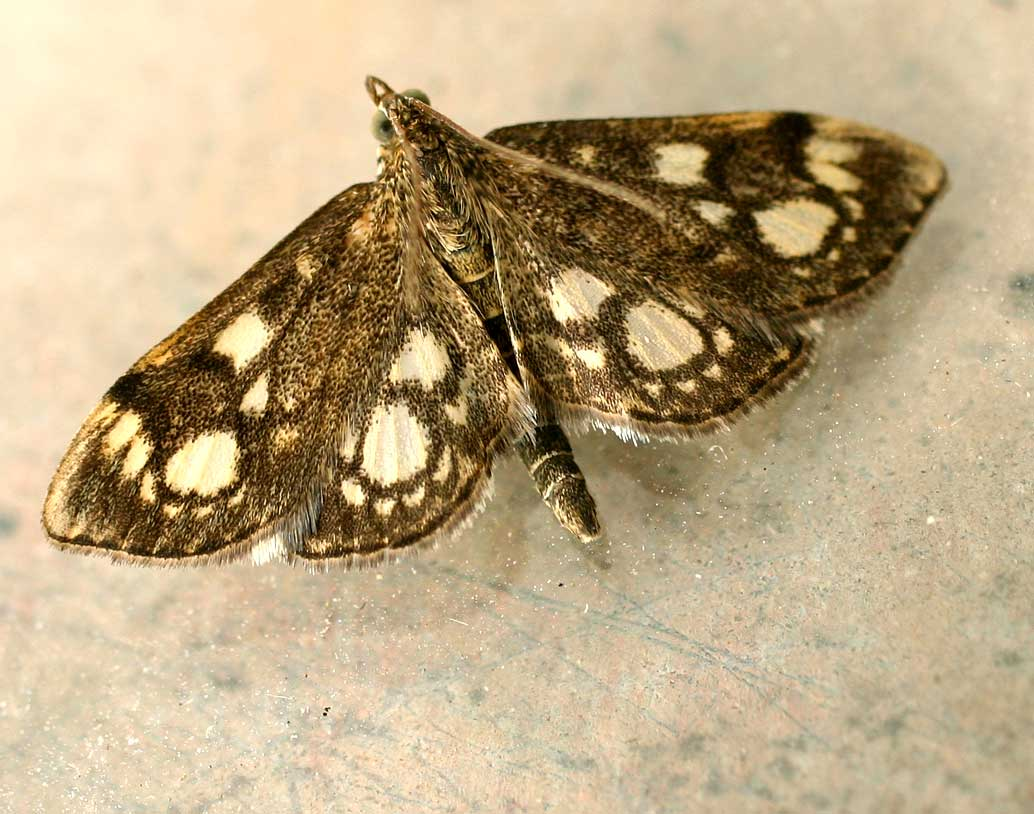

Scientific classification
- Kingdom: Animalia
- Phylum: Arthropoda
- Clade: Pancrustacea
- Class: Insecta
- Order: Lepidoptera
- Family: Crambidae
- Genus: Anania
- Species: A. coronata

Binomial name
- Anania coronata (Hufnagel, 1767)

Synonyms
- Phalaena coronata Hufnagel, 1767; Phlyctaenia coronata; Phalaena sambuci Retzius, 1783; Pyralis sambucalis Denis & Schiffermüller, 1775; Phalaena ambucaria Fabricius, 1787

= Anania coronata =

Species of moth

Anania coronata, the elderberry pearl, elder pearl or crowned phlyctaenia, is a species of moth of the family Crambidae. It was described by Johann Siegfried Hufnagel in 1767 and is found in the northern parts of the Palearctic realm. It was previously also considered present in the Nearctic realm, but was found to be part of a species complex, with A. coronata being restricted to the Palearctic while the three closely related species A. plectilis, A. tertialis and A. tennesseensis are only present in the Nearctic. The adults of the species closely resembles Anania stachydalis.

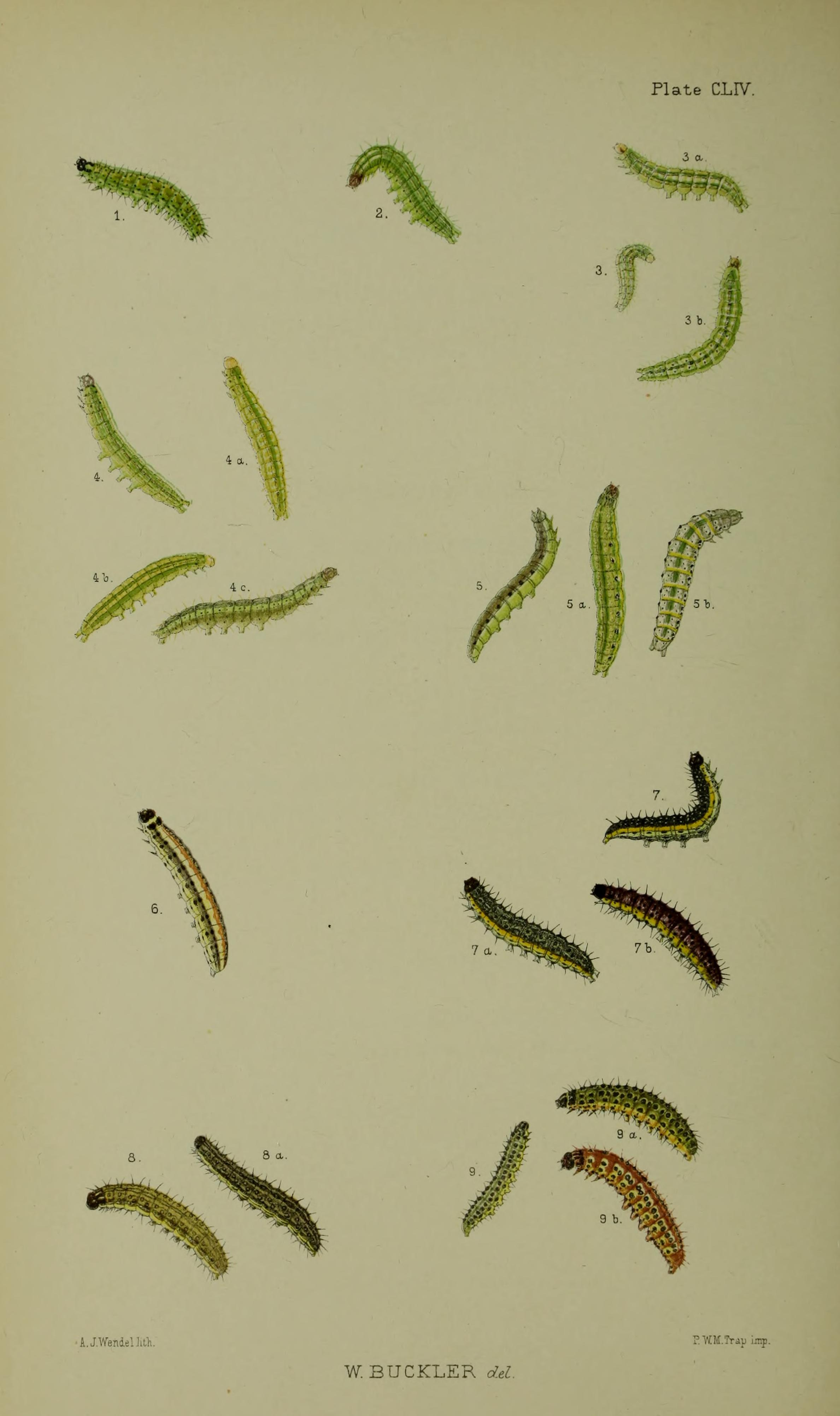
Figs.4, 4a, 4b, 4c larvae in various stages of growth

The wingspan is 23–26 mm. Forewings dark fuscous, sprinkled with yellow-whitish; first line indistinct, preceded by a whitish dot; second dark fuscous, posteriorly with a waved whitish-yellowish edging, middle third forming a quadrangular projection including a pale whitish-yellowish blotch, below this with a loop inwards enclosing a whitish-yellowish spot; orbicular dot and transverse discal mark darker, separated by a square whitish-yellowish spot. Hindwings as forewings, but anterior markings obsolete, posterior pale blotches much enlarged. The larva is whitish-green; dorsal and subdorsal lines green; incisions yellowish; on 3 and usually 4 a black lateral spot.

The moth flies from May to August depending on location.

The caterpillars feed on elderberry, Calystegia sepium, sunflower, Ligustrum, Viburnum and common lilac.
