= Anani =

Anani is both a surname and a given name. Notable people with the name include:

== Surname ==
- Achille Anani (born 1994), Ivorian professional footballer
- Jawad Anani (born 1943), Jordanian economist and politician
- Mohsen Mohamed Anani (born 1985), Egyptian hammer thrower
- Nabil Anani (born 1943), Palestinian artist
- Sumya Anani (born 1972), retired American professional female boxer
- Zachariah Anani, former Sunni Muslim Lebanese who converted to Christianity and settled in Canada

== Given name ==
- Francis Anani Kofi Lodonu (born 1937), Ghanaian Roman Catholic bishop
- Anani Mikhaylov (born 1948), Bulgarian fencer
- Anani ben Sason, Jewish Talmudist who lived in the Land of Israel, an amora of the third century
- Anani Yavashev (born 1932), Bulgarian actor

== See also ==
- Anaeini, a tribe of butterflies
- Anagni, an ancient town in Italy
- Anania, a genus of moths
- Ananiah, a town in the Bible
- Ananias (disambiguation)
- Ananiel, a character in the Book of Enoch
- Ananius (fl. c. 540 BCE), a Greek poet
- Hanani, the name of four men mentioned in the Bible
- Wanani, a town in the Comoros
