= Ananias =

Ananias may refer to:

== People ==
=== Mononyms ===
- Ananias ben Onias, general of Cleopatra III
- Ananias of Adiabene (c. 15 BCE–c. 30 CE), Jewish merchant and mendicant proselytizer prominent at the court of Abinergaos I
- Ananias son of Nedebeus, first century CE high priest of the Jewish Sanhedrin, who presided during the trial of Paul at Jerusalem and Caesarea
- Ananias and Sapphira, members of the first Christian community, who were struck dead for lying to God
- Ananias of Damascus or St. Ananias II, missionary, martyr, and patron of St. Paul
- Ananias III, a saint in the 3rd century
- Ananias (Persian) (died 345), priest and fellow martyr of Shemon bar Sabbae
- Ananias of Shirak or Anania Shirakatsi (610–685), Armenian mathematician and astronomer of 7th century
- Ananias I of Armenia (died 968)
- Ananias of Lakedaemonia (died 1764)
- Ananias (Jafaridze) (born 1949), Metropolitan of Manglisi and the Tetri-Tskaro of the Georgian Orthodox Church
- Ananias (footballer) (1989–2016), Brazilian footballer

=== Surname ===
- Frans Ananias (born 1972), Namibian retired footballer
- Patrus Ananias (born 1952), a Brazilian lawyer and politician

=== Given name ===
- Ananías Diokno (1860–1922), Leader of the Filipino Visayan forces against the US during the Philippine–American War; grandfather of José W. Diokno
- Ananias Dare (c. 1560–1587), husband of Eleanor White and father of Virginia Dare, whose birth was the first to English parents in North America
- Ananias Davisson (1780–1857), American singing school teacher, printer and compiler of shape note tunebooks
- Ananías Maidana (1923–2010), teacher and politician in Paraguay

== Other uses ==
- Ananias (gastropod), an extinct genus in family Eotomariidae

== See also ==
- Prince Ananias, a 1894 operetta composed by Victor Herbert
- Tenente Ananias, a municipality in the state of Rio Grande do Norte in the Northeast region of Brazil
- Jesus ben Ananias, plebeian and husbandman who predicted the fall of Jerusalem c. 62 CE
- Anania (name)
- Hananiah (disambiguation)
