= Anania shanxiensis =

Scientific classification
- Kingdom: Animalia
- Phylum: Arthropoda
- Clade: Pancrustacea
- Class: Insecta
- Order: Lepidoptera
- Family: Crambidae
- Genus: Anania
- Species: A. shanxiensis

Binomial name
- Anania shanxiensis Yang & J.-F. Landry, 2019

Synonyms
- Anania sinensis Yang & Landry, 2019

Species of moth

Anania shanxiensis is a moth in the subfamily Pyraustinae of the family Crambidae. It was described by Zhaofu Yang and Jean-François Landry in 2019 as Anania sinensis, which turned out to be a junior secondary homonym of a previously described taxon, Anania lancealis sinensis (Munroe & Mutuura, 1968). The replacement name for A. sinensis Yang & Landry, 2019 is Anania shanxiensis Yang & Landry, 2019.

== Description ==
With a similar colouration and wing pattern, the imagines (adult moths) of the A. shanxiensis closely resemble those of A. hortulata, as which they might have been misidentified in the past. Both species can be distinguished from each other by a number of genitalic features, such as the number of coils in the female ductus bursae and the male ductus ejaculatorius (eight coils in A. shanxiensis, seven in A. hortulata), the shape of the sella lobe and of its spinulose process, or the structure of the phallic rods.

Genetically, A. shanxiensis and A. hortulata are closely related: In the DNA barcoding fragment of the cytochrome c oxidase subunit I gene, the species exhibit an average of 2.73% of interspecific Kimura two-parameter distance. Using a molecular clock of 0.0115 per site per million years, the divergence time of the sister species A. shanxiensis and A. hortulata is estimated to be 0.9 million years ago.

== Distribution ==
Anania shanxiensis is distributed in the Chinese provinces of Beijing, Gansu, Guangdong, Guizhou, Hainan, Hebei, Henan, Jiangsu, Ningxia, Qinghai, Shaanxi, Shanxi, Sichuan and Yunnan. So far, the species has not been recorded outside of China.

== Biology ==
The larval host plant is probably Marrubium vulgare (Lamiaceae), which was recorded as food plant for Chinese specimens of A. hortulata, a likely misidentification of A. shanxiensis.

== Etymology ==
The species epithet, shanxiensis, refers to the Chinese province Shanxi, where the type locality of the holotype is located.
