= Anania flavimacularis =

Scientific classification
- Kingdom: Animalia
- Phylum: Arthropoda
- Clade: Pancrustacea
- Class: Insecta
- Order: Lepidoptera
- Family: Crambidae
- Genus: Anania
- Species: A. flavimacularis

Binomial name
- Anania flavimacularis (Zhang, Li & Song, 2002)

Synonyms
- Mutuuraia flavimacularis Zhang, Li & Song, 2002

Species of moth

Anania flavimacularis is a moth in the family Crambidae. It was described by Dan-Dan Zhang, Hou-Hun Li and Shi-Mei Song in 2002. It is found in Yunnan, China.
