= Anania coronatoides =

Scientific classification
- Kingdom: Animalia
- Phylum: Arthropoda
- Clade: Pancrustacea
- Class: Insecta
- Order: Lepidoptera
- Family: Crambidae
- Genus: Anania
- Species: A. coronatoides

Binomial name
- Anania coronatoides (Inoue, 1960)

Synonyms
- Pyrausta coronatoides Inoue, 1960; Pyrausta sambucalis Shibuya, 1929 (nec. Denis & Schiffermüller, 1777); Anania sambucalis

Species of moth

Anania coronatoides is a moth in the family Crambidae. It was described by Hiroshi Inoue in 1960. It is found in Japan (Hokkaido).
