= Anania gracilis =

Scientific classification
- Kingdom: Animalia
- Phylum: Arthropoda
- Clade: Pancrustacea
- Class: Insecta
- Order: Lepidoptera
- Family: Crambidae
- Genus: Anania
- Species: A. gracilis

Binomial name
- Anania gracilis (Maes, 2005)

Synonyms
- Algedonia gracilis Maes, 2005

Species of moth

Anania gracilis is a moth in the family Crambidae. It was described by Koen V. N. Maes in 2005. It is found in Kenya and Tanzania.
