= Anania ochrofascialis =

Scientific classification
- Kingdom: Animalia
- Phylum: Arthropoda
- Clade: Pancrustacea
- Class: Insecta
- Order: Lepidoptera
- Family: Crambidae
- Genus: Anania
- Species: A. ochrofascialis

Binomial name
- Anania ochrofascialis (Christoph, 1882)

Synonyms
- Metasia ochrofascialis Christoph, 1882; Achyra ochrofascialis; Botys retowskyi Möschler, 1888; Hypotia bilinea Bethune-Baker, 1894; Metasia younesalis Chrétien, 1915; Metasia ochrifascialis Rebel, 1901

Species of moth

Anania ochrofascialis is a species of moth in the family Crambidae. It is found in Ukraine, the southern part of European Russia (south of the Dead Sea), Azerbaijan, Egypt, Tunisia and Kazakhstan.

The length of the forewings is 7–9 mm.
