= Anania extricalis =

Scientific classification
- Kingdom: Animalia
- Phylum: Arthropoda
- Clade: Pancrustacea
- Class: Insecta
- Order: Lepidoptera
- Family: Crambidae
- Genus: Anania
- Species: A. extricalis

Binomial name
- Anania extricalis (Guenée, 1854)

Synonyms
- Botys extricalis Guenée, 1854; Nealgedonia extricalis; Botis oppilalis Grote, 1880; Botys intricatalis Lederer, 1863; Pionea extricalis dionalis Walker, 1859; Pyrausta bedecci Dyar, 1913; Spilodes nisoeecalis Walker, 1859

Species of moth

Anania extricalis is a moth in the family Crambidae. It was described by Achille Guenée in 1854. It is found in North America, where it has been recorded from Newfoundland to Florida, west to Texas and Saskatchewan.

The wingspan is about 25 mm. The forewings are light greyish brown with dark grey lines. The hindwings are pale grey.

The larvae feed on the leaves of Alnus species, Populus balsamifera and Betula papyrifera.
