= Anania melastictalis =

Scientific classification
- Kingdom: Animalia
- Phylum: Arthropoda
- Clade: Pancrustacea
- Class: Insecta
- Order: Lepidoptera
- Family: Crambidae
- Genus: Anania
- Species: A. melastictalis

Binomial name
- Anania melastictalis (Hampson, 1913)

Synonyms
- Pionea melastictalis Hampson, 1913

Species of moth

Anania melastictalis is a moth in the family Crambidae. It was described by George Hampson in 1913. It is found in Peru.
