= Anania bifossata =

Scientific classification
- Kingdom: Animalia
- Phylum: Arthropoda
- Clade: Pancrustacea
- Class: Insecta
- Order: Lepidoptera
- Family: Crambidae
- Genus: Anania
- Species: A. bifossata

Binomial name
- Anania bifossata (Hampson, 1918)

Synonyms
- Hapalia bifossata Hampson, 1918

Species of moth

Anania bifossata is a moth in the family Crambidae. It was described by George Hampson in 1918. It is found in Peru.
