= Anania griseofascialis =

Scientific classification
- Kingdom: Animalia
- Phylum: Arthropoda
- Clade: Pancrustacea
- Class: Insecta
- Order: Lepidoptera
- Family: Crambidae
- Genus: Anania
- Species: A. griseofascialis

Binomial name
- Anania griseofascialis Maes, 2003

Species of moth

Anania griseofascialis is a moth in the family Crambidae. It was described by Koen V. N. Maes in 2003. It is found in Tanzania.
