= Anania ieralis =

Scientific classification
- Kingdom: Animalia
- Phylum: Arthropoda
- Clade: Pancrustacea
- Class: Insecta
- Order: Lepidoptera
- Family: Crambidae
- Genus: Anania
- Species: A. ieralis

Binomial name
- Anania ieralis (Kaye, 1925)

Synonyms
- Hapalia ieralis Kaye, 1925

Species of moth

Anania ieralis is a moth in the family Crambidae. It was described by William James Kaye in 1925. It is found in Trinidad.
