= Anania bryalis =

Scientific classification
- Kingdom: Animalia
- Phylum: Arthropoda
- Clade: Pancrustacea
- Class: Insecta
- Order: Lepidoptera
- Family: Crambidae
- Genus: Anania
- Species: A. bryalis

Binomial name
- Anania bryalis (Hampson, 1918)

Synonyms
- Lamprosema bryalis Hampson, 1918

Species of moth

Anania bryalis is a moth in the family Crambidae. It was described by George Hampson in 1918. It is found in Kenya and the Democratic Republic of the Congo.
