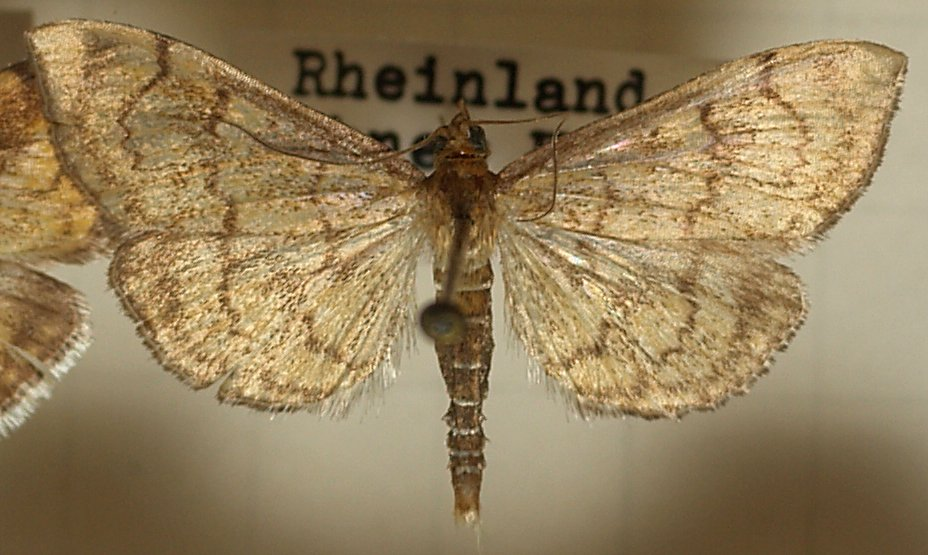

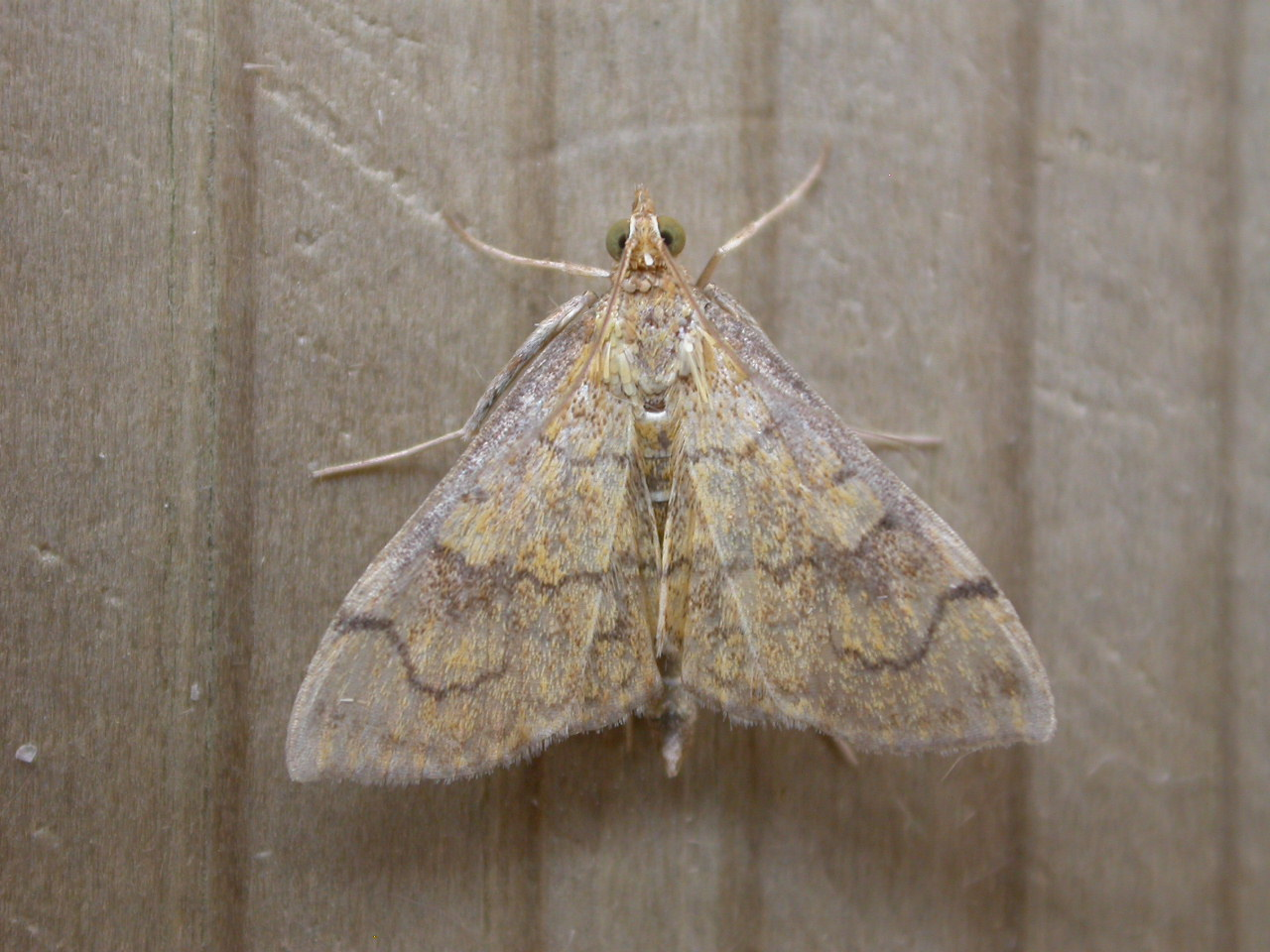

Scientific classification
- Kingdom: Animalia
- Phylum: Arthropoda
- Clade: Pancrustacea
- Class: Insecta
- Order: Lepidoptera
- Family: Crambidae
- Genus: Anania
- Species: A. verbascalis

Binomial name
- Anania verbascalis (Denis & Schiffermüller, 1775)

Synonyms
- Pyralis verbascalis Denis & Schiffermüller, 1775; Botys plumbocilialis Snellen, 1890; Anania verbascalis parvalis (Osthelder, 1935); Pionea verbascalis f. intanecalis Caradja, 1927; Pyralis arcualis Hübner, 1796

= Anania verbascalis =

Species of moth

Anania verbascalis is a species of moth of the family Crambidae. It is found in Europe.

The wingspan is 22–26 mm. The moth flies from June to August depending on the location.

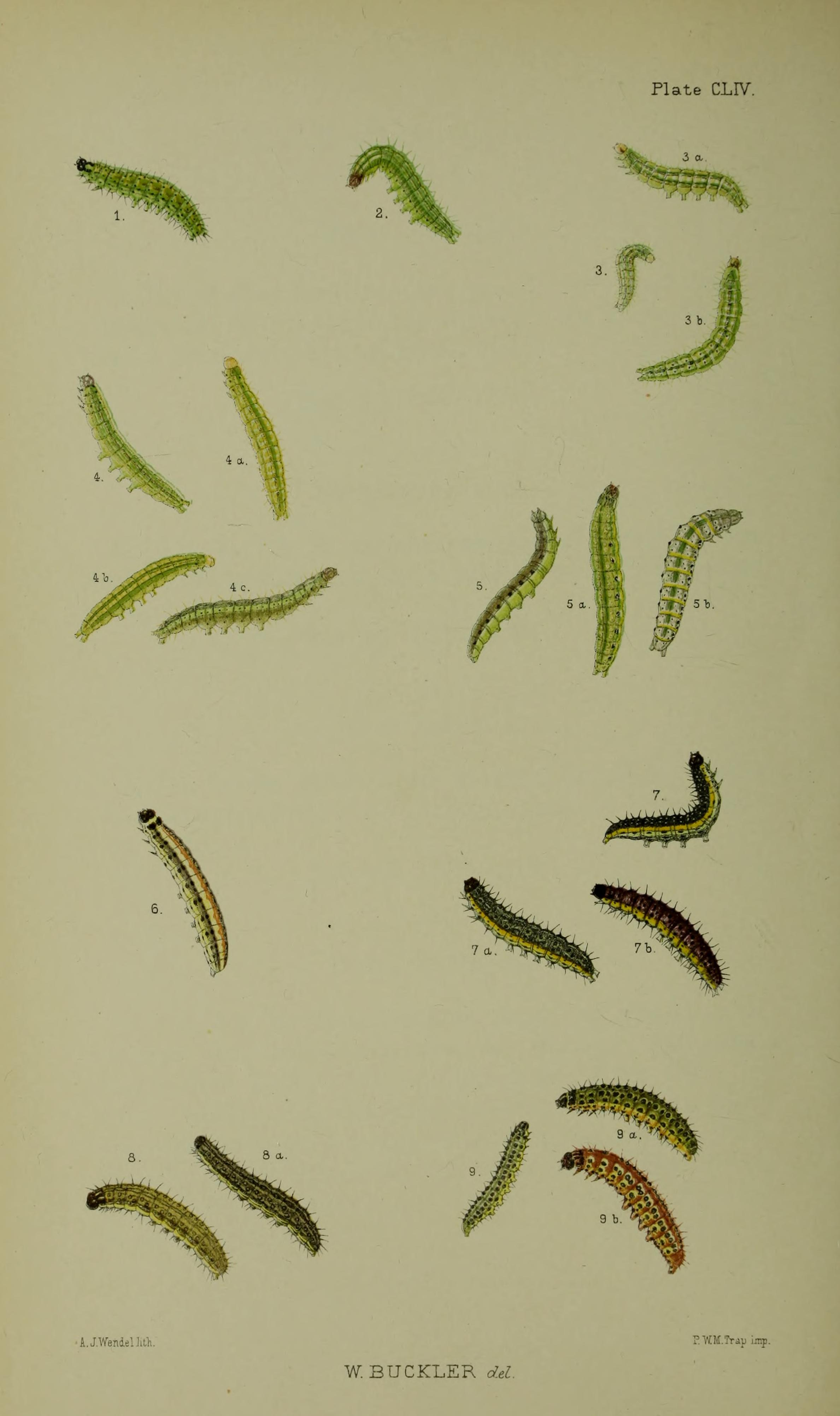
Fig.2 larva after final moult

The larvae feed on Teucrium scorodonia and Verbascum thapsus.
