= Anania shafferi =

Scientific classification
- Kingdom: Animalia
- Phylum: Arthropoda
- Clade: Pancrustacea
- Class: Insecta
- Order: Lepidoptera
- Family: Crambidae
- Genus: Anania
- Species: A. shafferi

Binomial name
- Anania shafferi (Speidel & Hanigk, 1990)

Synonyms
- Algedonia shafferi Speidel & Hanigk, 1990

Species of moth

Anania shafferi is a moth in the family Crambidae. It was described by Speidel and Hanigk in 1990. It is found in Afghanistan.
