= Anania fuscobrunnealis =

Scientific classification
- Kingdom: Animalia
- Phylum: Arthropoda
- Clade: Pancrustacea
- Class: Insecta
- Order: Lepidoptera
- Family: Crambidae
- Genus: Anania
- Species: A. fuscobrunnealis

Binomial name
- Anania fuscobrunnealis (South in Leech & South, 1901)

Synonyms
- Pyrausta fuscobrunnealis South in Leech & South, 1901

Species of moth

Anania fuscobrunnealis is a moth in the family Crambidae. It was described by South in 1901. It is found in China (Hubei) and Russia.
