= Anania inclusalis =

Scientific classification
- Kingdom: Animalia
- Phylum: Arthropoda
- Clade: Pancrustacea
- Class: Insecta
- Order: Lepidoptera
- Family: Crambidae
- Genus: Anania
- Species: A. inclusalis

Binomial name
- Anania inclusalis (Walker, 1866)

Synonyms
- Scopula inclusalis Walker, 1866; Eurycreon fuscocilialis Snellen, 1875

Species of moth

Anania inclusalis is a moth in the family Crambidae. It was described by Francis Walker in 1866. It is found in Honduras and Colombia.
