= Anania fuscofulvalis =

Scientific classification
- Kingdom: Animalia
- Phylum: Arthropoda
- Clade: Pancrustacea
- Class: Insecta
- Order: Lepidoptera
- Family: Crambidae
- Genus: Anania
- Species: A. fuscofulvalis

Binomial name
- Anania fuscofulvalis Yamanaka, 2000

Species of moth

Anania fuscofulvalis is a moth in the family Crambidae. It was described by Hiroshi Yamanaka in 2000. It is found in Nepal.
