= Anania flavipartalis =

Scientific classification
- Kingdom: Animalia
- Phylum: Arthropoda
- Clade: Pancrustacea
- Class: Insecta
- Order: Lepidoptera
- Family: Crambidae
- Genus: Anania
- Species: A. flavipartalis

Binomial name
- Anania flavipartalis (Hampson, 1918)

Synonyms
- Hapalia flavipartalis Hampson, 1918

Species of moth

Anania flavipartalis is a moth in the family Crambidae. It was described by George Hampson in 1918. It is found in Colombia.
