= Anania profusalis =

Scientific classification
- Kingdom: Animalia
- Phylum: Arthropoda
- Clade: Pancrustacea
- Class: Insecta
- Order: Lepidoptera
- Family: Crambidae
- Genus: Anania
- Species: A. profusalis

Binomial name
- Anania profusalis (Warren, 1896)

Synonyms
- Opsibotys profusalis Warren, 1896

Species of moth

Anania profusalis is a moth in the family Crambidae. It was described by Warren in 1896. It is found in India (Khasia Hills).
