= Anania alta =

Scientific classification
- Kingdom: Animalia
- Phylum: Arthropoda
- Clade: Pancrustacea
- Class: Insecta
- Order: Lepidoptera
- Family: Crambidae
- Genus: Anania
- Species: A. alta

Binomial name
- Anania alta (Maes, 2005)

Synonyms
- Algedonia alta Maes, 2005

Species of moth

Anania alta is a moth in the family Crambidae. It was described by Koen V. N. Maes in 2005. It is found in Cameroon, the Democratic Republic of the Congo, Equatorial Guinea (Bioko) and Uganda.
