= Anania dichroma =

Scientific classification
- Kingdom: Animalia
- Phylum: Arthropoda
- Clade: Pancrustacea
- Class: Insecta
- Order: Lepidoptera
- Family: Crambidae
- Genus: Anania
- Species: A. dichroma

Binomial name
- Anania dichroma (Moore, 1888)

Synonyms
- Ebulea dichroma Moore, 1888

Species of moth

Anania dichroma is a moth in the family Crambidae. It was described by Frederic Moore in 1888. It is found in Darjeeling, India.
