= Anania oberthuri =

Scientific classification
- Kingdom: Animalia
- Phylum: Arthropoda
- Clade: Pancrustacea
- Class: Insecta
- Order: Lepidoptera
- Family: Crambidae
- Genus: Anania
- Species: A. oberthuri

Binomial name
- Anania oberthuri (Turati, 1913)

Synonyms
- Botys (Sylepta) oberthuri Turati, 1913; Algedonia oberthuri; Mutuuraia oberthuri; Pleuroptya oberthueri Leraut, 1980; Pionea corsicalis Caradja, 1928

Species of moth

Anania oberthuri is a species of moth in the family Crambidae. It is found on Corsica and Sardinia.

The wingspan is 22–23 mm.
