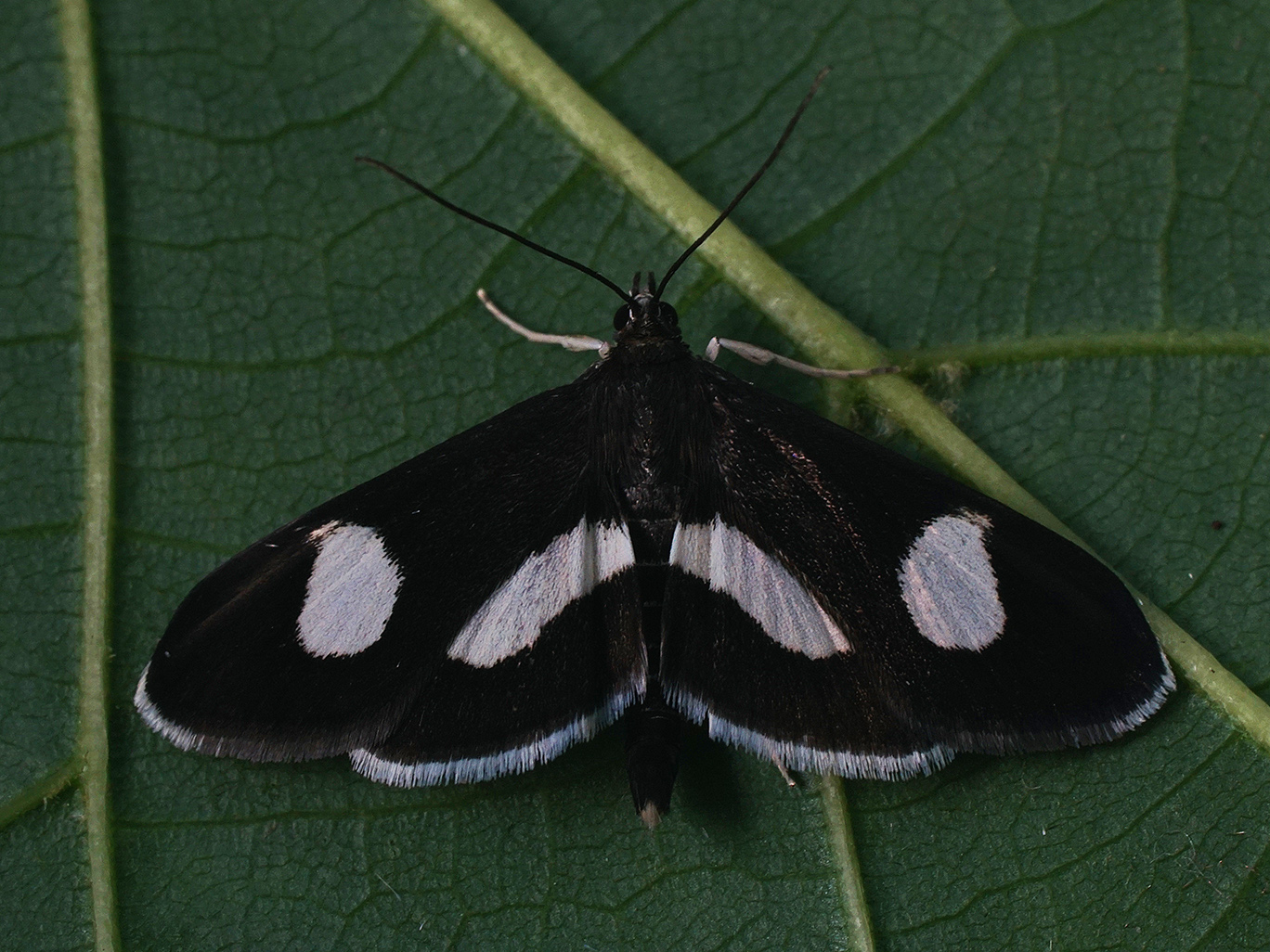

Scientific classification
- Kingdom: Animalia
- Phylum: Arthropoda
- Clade: Pancrustacea
- Class: Insecta
- Order: Lepidoptera
- Family: Crambidae
- Genus: Anania
- Species: A. luctualis

Binomial name
- Anania luctualis (Hubner, 1793)

Synonyms
- Pyralis luctualis Hubner, 1793; Algedonia luctualis; Ennychia diversa Butler, 1881; Noctua unigutta Esper, 1798; Phalaena vidualis Fabricius, 1798

= Anania luctualis =

Species of moth

Anania luctualis is a species of moth in the family Crambidae. It is found in France, Switzerland, Austria, Italy, Croatia, Bosnia and Herzegovina, Hungary, Slovakia, Romania, Poland, Belarus and Russia. In the east, the range extends to China and Japan.

The wingspan is about 25 mm.
