= Anania perflavalis =

Scientific classification
- Kingdom: Animalia
- Phylum: Arthropoda
- Clade: Pancrustacea
- Class: Insecta
- Order: Lepidoptera
- Family: Crambidae
- Genus: Anania
- Species: A. perflavalis

Binomial name
- Anania perflavalis (Hampson, 1913)

Synonyms
- Pyrausta perflavalis Hampson, 1913; Ebulea perflavalis

Species of moth

Anania perflavalis is a moth in the family Crambidae. It was described by George Hampson in 1913. It is found in Australia, where it has been recorded from Queensland and New South Wales.

The wingspan is about 25 mm. The forewings are dark yellow with three brown zigzag lines. The hindwings are pale yellow, with narrow brown margins.
