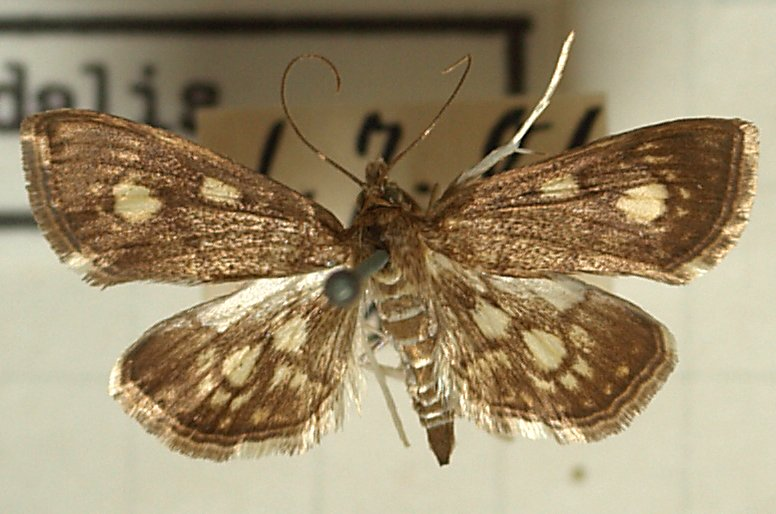

Scientific classification
- Kingdom: Animalia
- Phylum: Arthropoda
- Clade: Pancrustacea
- Class: Insecta
- Order: Lepidoptera
- Family: Crambidae
- Genus: Anania
- Species: A. stachydalis

Binomial name
- Anania stachydalis (Germar, 1821)

Synonyms
- Pyralis stachydalis Zincken in Germar, E. F., 1821; Phlyctaenia stachydalis

= Anania stachydalis =

Species of moth

Anania stachydalis is a species of moth of the family Crambidae. It is found in Europe. The species closely resembles Anania coronata.

The wingspan is 23–25 mm. The forewings are dark fuscous; lines hardly darker, first indistinct, second forming a very strong curve outwards above middle, and a deep abrupt sinuation inwards below it, preceded by a whitish -yellowish spot in the curve, and interruptedly edged posteriorly with whitish-yellowish on upper half; orbicular dot and linear discal mark darker, separated by a whitish-yellowish spot. Hindwings as forewings, but pale spots in disc larger and approximated; a pale costal spot before second line. The larva is green, incisions white; subdorsal line white; spiracular fine, whitish; spots green, whitish-ringed; head whitish.

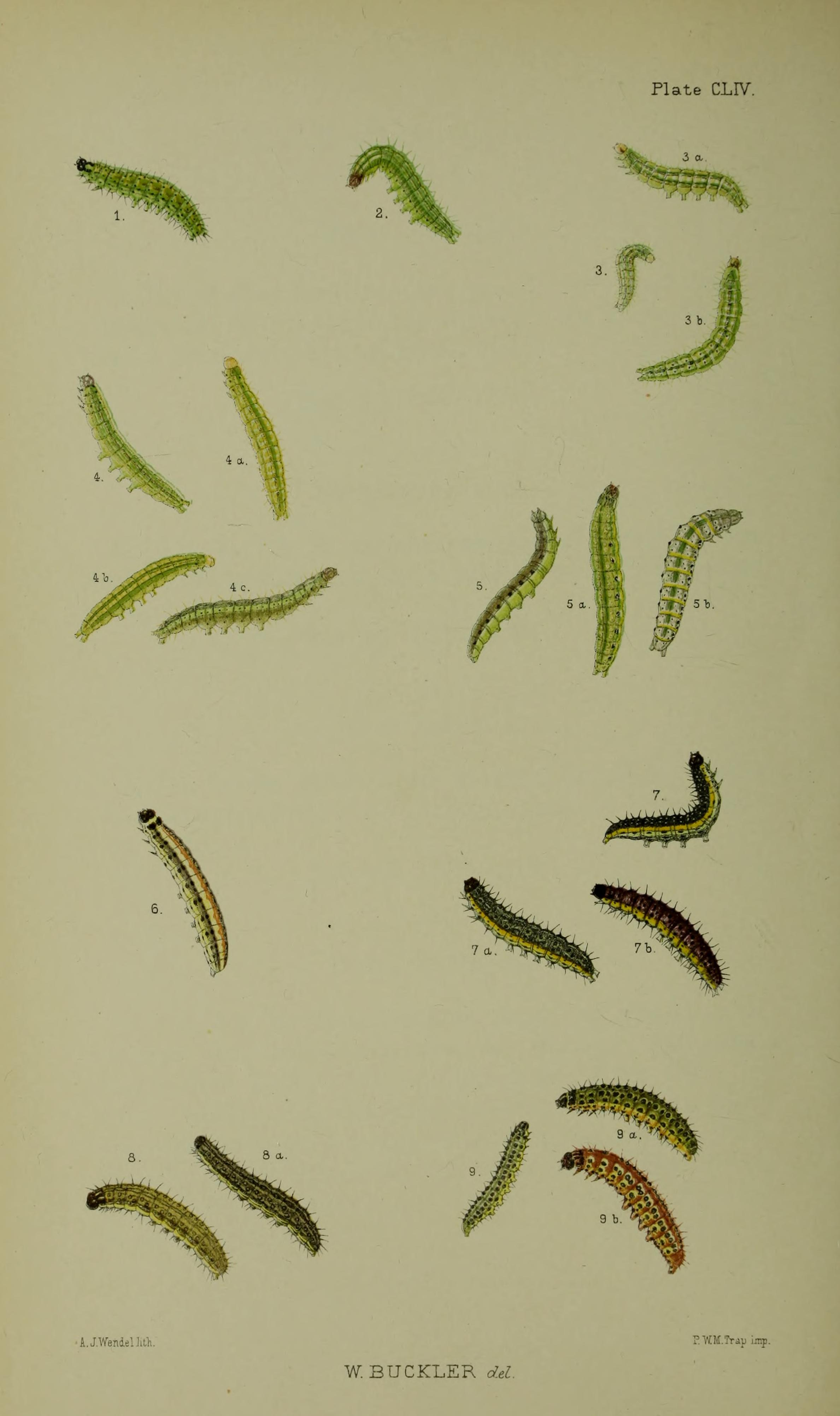
Figs. 3, 3a, 3b larvae in various stages of growth

The moth flies from May to August depending on the location.

The larvae feed on Stachys.
