= Anania ochriscriptalis =

Scientific classification
- Kingdom: Animalia
- Phylum: Arthropoda
- Clade: Pancrustacea
- Class: Insecta
- Order: Lepidoptera
- Family: Crambidae
- Genus: Anania
- Species: A. ochriscriptalis

Binomial name
- Anania ochriscriptalis (Marion & Viette, 1956)

Synonyms
- Evulea ochriscriptalis Marion & Viette, 1956

Species of moth

Anania ochriscriptalis is a species of moth of the family Crambidae. It is found in Madagascar.
