= Anania otiosalis =

Scientific classification
- Kingdom: Animalia
- Phylum: Arthropoda
- Clade: Pancrustacea
- Class: Insecta
- Order: Lepidoptera
- Family: Crambidae
- Genus: Anania
- Species: A. otiosalis

Binomial name
- Anania otiosalis (Lederer, 1863)

Synonyms
- Botys otiosalis Lederer, 1863

Species of moth

Anania otiosalis is a moth in the family Crambidae. It was described by Julius Lederer in 1863. It is found in Brazil.
