= Anania austa =

Scientific classification
- Kingdom: Animalia
- Phylum: Arthropoda
- Clade: Pancrustacea
- Class: Insecta
- Order: Lepidoptera
- Family: Crambidae
- Genus: Anania
- Species: A. austa

Binomial name
- Anania austa (Strand, 1918)

Synonyms
- Pyrausta austa Strand, 1918; Pronomis austa

Species of moth

Anania austa is a moth in the family Crambidae. It was described by Strand in 1918. It is found in Taiwan.
