= Anania caudatella =

Scientific classification
- Kingdom: Animalia
- Phylum: Arthropoda
- Clade: Pancrustacea
- Class: Insecta
- Order: Lepidoptera
- Family: Crambidae
- Genus: Anania
- Species: A. caudatella

Binomial name
- Anania caudatella (Dyar, 1912)

Synonyms
- Pilocrosis caudatella Dyar, 1912

Species of moth

Anania caudatella is a moth in the family Crambidae. It was described by Harrison Gray Dyar Jr. in 1912. It is found in Mexico.
