= Anania vicinalis =

Scientific classification
- Kingdom: Animalia
- Phylum: Arthropoda
- Clade: Pancrustacea
- Class: Insecta
- Order: Lepidoptera
- Family: Crambidae
- Genus: Anania
- Species: A. vicinalis

Binomial name
- Anania vicinalis (South, 1901)

Synonyms
- Pyrausta vicinalis South in Leech & South, 1901; Udonomeiga vicinalis (South, 1901)

Species of moth

Anania vicinalis is a moth in the family Crambidae. It was described by Richard South in 1901. It is found in China.
