= Anania phaeopastalis =

Scientific classification
- Kingdom: Animalia
- Phylum: Arthropoda
- Clade: Pancrustacea
- Class: Insecta
- Order: Lepidoptera
- Family: Crambidae
- Genus: Anania
- Species: A. phaeopastalis

Binomial name
- Anania phaeopastalis (Hampson, 1913)

Synonyms
- Pyrausta phaeopastalis Hampson, 1913; Pyrausta herbuloti Rougeot, 1977

Species of moth

Anania phaeopastalis is a moth in the family Crambidae. It was described by George Hampson in 1913. It is found in Cameroon, Djibouti, Eritrea, Kenya and Tanzania.
