= Anania amphinephela =

Scientific classification
- Kingdom: Animalia
- Phylum: Arthropoda
- Clade: Pancrustacea
- Class: Insecta
- Order: Lepidoptera
- Family: Crambidae
- Genus: Anania
- Species: A. amphinephela

Binomial name
- Anania amphinephela (Meyrick, 1933)

Synonyms
- Pyrausta amphinephela Meyrick, 1933

Species of moth

Anania amphinephela is a moth in the family Crambidae. It was described by Edward Meyrick in 1933. It is found in the Democratic Republic of the Congo and Kenya.
