= Anania antigastridia =

Scientific classification
- Kingdom: Animalia
- Phylum: Arthropoda
- Clade: Pancrustacea
- Class: Insecta
- Order: Lepidoptera
- Family: Crambidae
- Genus: Anania
- Species: A. antigastridia

Binomial name
- Anania antigastridia (Hampson, 1899)

Synonyms
- Pionea antigastridia Hampson, 1899

Species of moth

Anania antigastridia is a moth in the family Crambidae. It was described by George Hampson in 1899. It is found in Mexico.
