= Anania aurea =

Scientific classification
- Kingdom: Animalia
- Phylum: Arthropoda
- Clade: Pancrustacea
- Class: Insecta
- Order: Lepidoptera
- Family: Crambidae
- Genus: Anania
- Species: A. aurea

Binomial name
- Anania aurea (Butler, 1875)

Synonyms
- Pyrausta aurea Butler, 1875

Species of moth

Anania aurea is a moth in the family Crambidae. It was described by Arthur Gardiner Butler in 1875. It is found in South Africa, where it has been recorded from KwaZulu-Natal.
