= Anania elutalis =

Scientific classification
- Kingdom: Animalia
- Phylum: Arthropoda
- Clade: Pancrustacea
- Class: Insecta
- Order: Lepidoptera
- Family: Crambidae
- Genus: Anania
- Species: A. elutalis

Binomial name
- Anania elutalis (Kenrick, 1917)

Synonyms
- Pyrausta elutalis Kenrick, 1917; Ethiobotys elutalis Maes, 1997

Species of moth

Anania elutalis is a species of moth of the family Crambidae. It was first described by George Hamilton Kenrick in 1917 and is found in Madagascar.

The head, antennae, and palpi of this species are dark brown, with tarsi ringed dark brown. The thorax and patagia are greenish-grey, and the abdomen is pale brown. The forewings are greenish-grey, with a darker, curved antemedian line, a sinuous median line, and a postmedian angulated line. The hindwings are pale brown without markings. The wingspan of this species is 32 mm.
