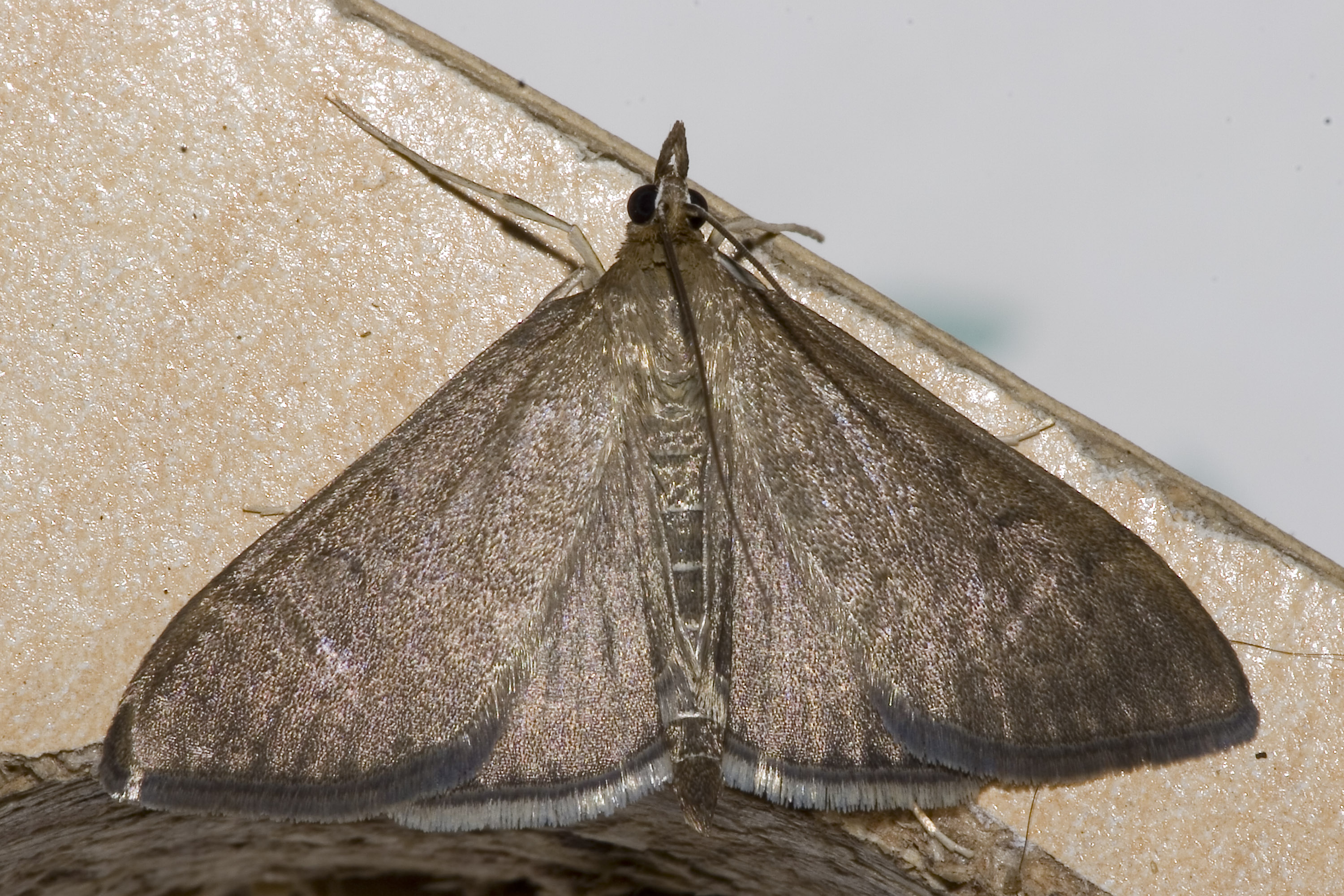

Scientific classification
- Kingdom: Animalia
- Phylum: Arthropoda
- Clade: Pancrustacea
- Class: Insecta
- Order: Lepidoptera
- Family: Crambidae
- Genus: Anania
- Species: A. terrealis

Binomial name
- Anania terrealis (Treitschke, 1829)

Synonyms
- Botys terrealis Treitschke, 1829; Algedonia terrealis; Pyrausta terrealis reisseri Zerny, 1932; Scopula borealis J. Curtis, 1830; Scopula pinetalis Zetterstedt, 1839

= Anania terrealis =

Species of moth

Anania terrealis is a species of moth of the family Crambidae that is found in Europe. The insect has a wingspan of 24–28 mm, flies from June to August depending on the location, and has larvae that feed on Solidago virgaurea and asters.

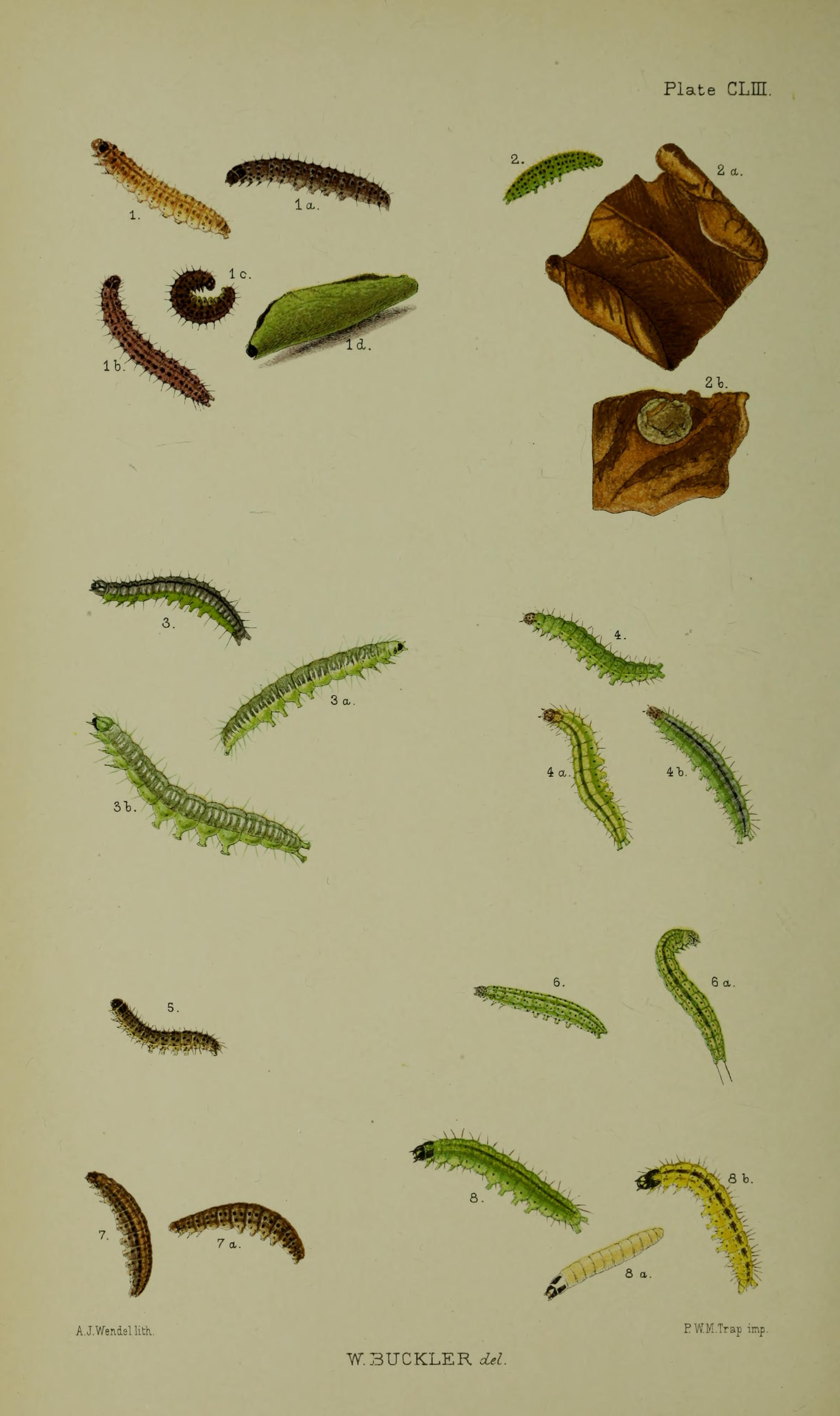
Figs. 6, 6a larvae in various stages of growth
