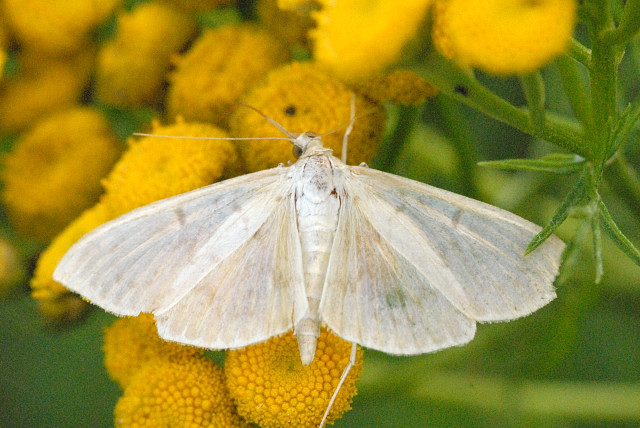

Scientific classification
- Kingdom: Animalia
- Phylum: Arthropoda
- Clade: Pancrustacea
- Class: Insecta
- Order: Lepidoptera
- Family: Crambidae
- Genus: Anania
- Species: A. perlucidalis

Binomial name
- Anania perlucidalis (Hübner, 1809)

Synonyms
- Pyralis perlucidalis Hübner, 1800–1809; Phlyctaenia perlucidalis

= Anania perlucidalis =

Species of moth

Anania perlucidalis, the fenland pearl, is a species of moth of the family Crambidae. It was described by Jacob Hübner in 1809 and is found in Europe.

The wingspan is 21–23 mm (0.83–0.91 in). The moth flies from June to August depending on the location.

The larvae feed on Cirsium oleraceum and other Cirsium species.
