= Anania subfumalis =

Scientific classification
- Kingdom: Animalia
- Phylum: Arthropoda
- Clade: Pancrustacea
- Class: Insecta
- Order: Lepidoptera
- Family: Crambidae
- Genus: Anania
- Species: A. subfumalis

Binomial name
- Anania subfumalis (Munroe & Mutuura, 1971)

Synonyms
- Tenerobotys subfumalis Munroe & Mutuura, 1971; Tenerobotys subfumalis continentalis Munroe & Mutuura, 1971

Species of moth

Anania subfumalis is a moth in the family Crambidae. It was described by Eugene G. Munroe and Akira Mutuura in 1971. It is found in Taiwan and Hunan, China.

== Subspecies ==
- Anania subfumalis subfumalis (Taiwan)
- Anania subfumalis continentalis (Munroe & Mutuura, 1971) (China: Hunan)
