= Anania contentalis =

Scientific classification
- Kingdom: Animalia
- Phylum: Arthropoda
- Clade: Pancrustacea
- Class: Insecta
- Order: Lepidoptera
- Family: Crambidae
- Genus: Anania
- Species: A. contentalis

Binomial name
- Anania contentalis (Schaus, 1912)

Synonyms
- Pionea contentalis Schaus, 1912

Species of moth

Anania contentalis is a moth in the family Crambidae. It was described by Schaus in 1912. It is found in Costa Rica.
