= Anania epipaschialis =

Scientific classification
- Kingdom: Animalia
- Phylum: Arthropoda
- Clade: Pancrustacea
- Class: Insecta
- Order: Lepidoptera
- Family: Crambidae
- Genus: Anania
- Species: A. epipaschialis

Binomial name
- Anania epipaschialis (Hampson, 1912)

Synonyms
- Nacoleia epipaschialis Hampson, 1912

Species of moth

Anania epipaschialis is a moth in the family Crambidae. It was described by George Hampson in 1912. It is found in Cameroon, the Democratic Republic of the Congo, Equatorial Guinea, Nigeria, Sierra Leone and Uganda.
