= Anania impunctata =

Scientific classification
- Kingdom: Animalia
- Phylum: Arthropoda
- Clade: Pancrustacea
- Class: Insecta
- Order: Lepidoptera
- Family: Crambidae
- Genus: Anania
- Species: A. impunctata

Binomial name
- Anania impunctata (Warren, 1897)

Synonyms
- Lygropis impunctata Warren, 1897

Species of moth

Anania impunctata is a moth in the family Crambidae. It was described by Warren in 1897. It is found in Botswana, Ethiopia, Lesotho, Malawi, Mozambique, South Africa, Zambia and Zimbabwe.
