= Anania conisanalis =

Scientific classification
- Kingdom: Animalia
- Phylum: Arthropoda
- Clade: Pancrustacea
- Class: Insecta
- Order: Lepidoptera
- Family: Crambidae
- Genus: Anania
- Species: A. conisanalis

Binomial name
- Anania conisanalis (Hampson, 1918)

Synonyms
- Hapalia conisanalis Hampson, 1918

Species of moth

Anania conisanalis is a moth in the family Crambidae. It was described by George Hampson in 1918. It is found in Malawi.
