= Anania obtusalis =

Scientific classification
- Kingdom: Animalia
- Phylum: Arthropoda
- Clade: Pancrustacea
- Class: Insecta
- Order: Lepidoptera
- Family: Crambidae
- Genus: Anania
- Species: A. obtusalis

Binomial name
- Anania obtusalis (Yamanaka, 1987)

Synonyms
- Perinephela obtusalis Yamanaka, 1987

Species of moth

Anania obtusalis is a moth in the family Crambidae. It was described by Hiroshi Yamanaka in 1987. It is found in Honshu, Japan.
