= Anania desistalis =

Scientific classification
- Kingdom: Animalia
- Phylum: Arthropoda
- Clade: Pancrustacea
- Class: Insecta
- Order: Lepidoptera
- Family: Crambidae
- Genus: Anania
- Species: A. desistalis

Binomial name
- Anania desistalis (Walker, 1862)

Synonyms
- Scopula desistalis Walker, 1862

Species of moth

Anania desistalis is a moth in the family Crambidae. It was described by Francis Walker in 1862. It is found in Brazil.
