= Anania federalis =

Scientific classification
- Kingdom: Animalia
- Phylum: Arthropoda
- Clade: Pancrustacea
- Class: Insecta
- Order: Lepidoptera
- Family: Crambidae
- Genus: Anania
- Species: A. federalis

Binomial name
- Anania federalis (Capps, 1967)

Synonyms
- Loxostege federalis Capps, 1967

Species of moth

Anania federalis is a moth in the family Crambidae. It was described by Hahn William Capps in 1967. It is found in Mexico.
