= Anania leuschneri =

Scientific classification
- Kingdom: Animalia
- Phylum: Arthropoda
- Clade: Pancrustacea
- Class: Insecta
- Order: Lepidoptera
- Family: Crambidae
- Genus: Anania
- Species: A. leuschneri

Binomial name
- Anania leuschneri (Munroe, 1976)

Synonyms
- Phlyctaenia leuschneri Munroe, 1976

Species of moth

Anania leuschneri is a moth in the family Crambidae. It was described by Eugene G. Munroe in 1976. It is found in North America, where it has been recorded from South Carolina and Florida.
