= Anania teneralis =

Scientific classification
- Kingdom: Animalia
- Phylum: Arthropoda
- Clade: Pancrustacea
- Class: Insecta
- Order: Lepidoptera
- Family: Crambidae
- Genus: Anania
- Species: A. teneralis

Binomial name
- Anania teneralis (Caradja, 1939)

Synonyms
- Hapalia teneralis Caradja, 1939; Tenerobotys teneralis tsinlingalis Munroe & Mutuura, 1971

Species of moth

Anania teneralis is a moth in the family Crambidae. It was described by Aristide Caradja in 1939. It is found in Russia and China.

== Subspecies ==
- Anania teneralis teneralis (China: Sichuan)
- Anania teneralis tsinlingalis (Munroe & Mutuura, 1971) (China: Shaanxi)
