= Anania tripartalis =

Scientific classification
- Kingdom: Animalia
- Phylum: Arthropoda
- Clade: Pancrustacea
- Class: Insecta
- Order: Lepidoptera
- Family: Crambidae
- Genus: Anania
- Species: A. tripartalis

Binomial name
- Anania tripartalis (Hampson, 1899)

Synonyms
- Pionea tripartalis Hampson, 1899

Species of moth

Anania tripartalis is a moth in the family Crambidae. It was described by George Hampson in 1899. It is found in Peru.
