= Anania albeoverbascalis =

Scientific classification
- Kingdom: Animalia
- Phylum: Arthropoda
- Clade: Pancrustacea
- Class: Insecta
- Order: Lepidoptera
- Family: Crambidae
- Genus: Anania
- Species: A. albeoverbascalis

Binomial name
- Anania albeoverbascalis Yamanaka, 1966

Species of moth

Anania albeoverbascalis is a species of moth in the family Crambidae. It was described by Hiroshi Yamanaka in 1966. It is found in Japan (Honshu) and China.
