= Anania flavicolor =

Scientific classification
- Kingdom: Animalia
- Phylum: Arthropoda
- Clade: Pancrustacea
- Class: Insecta
- Order: Lepidoptera
- Family: Crambidae
- Genus: Anania
- Species: A. flavicolor

Binomial name
- Anania flavicolor (Munroe & Mutuura, 1968)

Synonyms
- Pronomis flavicolor Munroe & Mutuura, 1968

Species of moth

Anania flavicolor is a moth in the family Crambidae. It was described by Eugene G. Munroe and Akira Mutuura in 1968. It is found in Taiwan.
