= Anania lysanderalis =

Scientific classification
- Kingdom: Animalia
- Phylum: Arthropoda
- Clade: Pancrustacea
- Class: Insecta
- Order: Lepidoptera
- Family: Crambidae
- Genus: Anania
- Species: A. lysanderalis

Binomial name
- Anania lysanderalis (Walker, 1859)

Synonyms
- Botys lysanderalis Walker, 1859

Species of moth

Anania lysanderalis is a moth in the family Crambidae. It was described by Francis Walker in 1859. It is found in Rio de Janeiro in Brazil and in Venezuela.
