= Anania ledereri =

Scientific classification
- Kingdom: Animalia
- Phylum: Arthropoda
- Clade: Pancrustacea
- Class: Insecta
- Order: Lepidoptera
- Family: Crambidae
- Genus: Anania
- Species: A. ledereri

Binomial name
- Anania ledereri (Amsel, 1956)

Synonyms
- Trichovalva ledereri Amsel, 1956

Species of moth

Anania ledereri is a moth in the family Crambidae. It was described by Hans Georg Amsel in 1956. It is found in Venezuela.
