= Anania labeculalis =

Scientific classification
- Kingdom: Animalia
- Phylum: Arthropoda
- Clade: Pancrustacea
- Class: Insecta
- Order: Lepidoptera
- Family: Crambidae
- Genus: Anania
- Species: A. labeculalis

Binomial name
- Anania labeculalis (Hulst, 1886)

Synonyms
- Botis labeculalis Hulst, 1886; Loxostege labeculalis

Species of moth

Anania labeculalis is a moth in the family Crambidae. It was described by George Duryea Hulst in 1886. It is found in North America, where it has been recorded from Arizona to western Texas.

The wingspan is 17–20 mm. The forewings are ochreous yellow with a brownish tinge subterminally and at the costa. The hindwings are white at the base and light ochre outwardly.
