= Anania flava =

Scientific classification
- Kingdom: Animalia
- Phylum: Arthropoda
- Clade: Pancrustacea
- Class: Insecta
- Order: Lepidoptera
- Family: Crambidae
- Genus: Anania
- Species: A. flava

Binomial name
- Anania flava (Maes, 2005)

Synonyms
- Algedonia flava Maes, 2005

Species of moth

Anania flava is a moth of the family Crambidae that was described by Koen V. N. Maes in 2005 and lives in Kenya.
