= Anania murcialis =

Scientific classification
- Kingdom: Animalia
- Phylum: Arthropoda
- Clade: Pancrustacea
- Class: Insecta
- Order: Lepidoptera
- Family: Crambidae
- Genus: Anania
- Species: A. murcialis

Binomial name
- Anania murcialis (Ragonot, 1895)

Synonyms
- Botys (Phlyctaenia) murcialis Ragonot, 1895; Achyra murcialis

Species of moth

Anania murcialis is a species of moth in the family Crambidae. It is found in Spain and Morocco.

The length of the forewings is 9–10 mm.
