= Anania acutalis =

Scientific classification
- Kingdom: Animalia
- Phylum: Arthropoda
- Clade: Pancrustacea
- Class: Insecta
- Order: Lepidoptera
- Family: Crambidae
- Genus: Anania
- Species: A. acutalis

Binomial name
- Anania acutalis (Dognin, 1905)

Synonyms
- Pionea acutalis Dognin, 1905

Species of moth

Anania acutalis is a moth in the family Crambidae. It was described by Paul Dognin in 1905. It is found in Loja Province, Ecuador.
