= Anania epicroca =

Scientific classification
- Kingdom: Animalia
- Phylum: Arthropoda
- Clade: Pancrustacea
- Class: Insecta
- Order: Lepidoptera
- Family: Crambidae
- Genus: Anania
- Species: A. epicroca

Binomial name
- Anania epicroca (Lower, 1903)

Synonyms
- Pyrausta epicroca Lower, 1903; Ebulea epicroca

Species of moth

Anania epicroca is a moth in the family Crambidae. It was described by Oswald Bertram Lower in 1903. It is found in Australia, where it has been recorded from Queensland.
