= Anania fovifera =

Scientific classification
- Kingdom: Animalia
- Phylum: Arthropoda
- Clade: Pancrustacea
- Class: Insecta
- Order: Lepidoptera
- Family: Crambidae
- Genus: Anania
- Species: A. fovifera

Binomial name
- Anania fovifera (Hampson, 1913)

Synonyms
- Pionea fovifera Hampson, 1913

Species of moth

Anania fovifera is a moth in the family Crambidae. It was described by George Hampson in 1913. It is found in Cuba.
