= Anania nullalis =

Scientific classification
- Kingdom: Animalia
- Phylum: Arthropoda
- Clade: Pancrustacea
- Class: Insecta
- Order: Lepidoptera
- Family: Crambidae
- Genus: Anania
- Species: A. nullalis

Binomial name
- Anania nullalis (Guenée, 1854)

Synonyms
- Ebulea nullalis Guenée, 1854

Species of moth

Anania nullalis is a moth in the family Crambidae. It was described by Achille Guenée in 1854. It is found in Brazil.
