= Anania rudalis =

Scientific classification
- Kingdom: Animalia
- Phylum: Arthropoda
- Clade: Pancrustacea
- Class: Insecta
- Order: Lepidoptera
- Family: Crambidae
- Genus: Anania
- Species: A. rudalis

Binomial name
- Anania rudalis (Zerny, 1939)

Synonyms
- Pyrausta rudalis Zerny, 1939

Species of moth

Anania rudalis is a moth in the family Crambidae. It was described by Zerny in 1939. It is found in Iran.
