= Anania nerissalis =

Scientific classification
- Kingdom: Animalia
- Phylum: Arthropoda
- Clade: Pancrustacea
- Class: Insecta
- Order: Lepidoptera
- Family: Crambidae
- Genus: Anania
- Species: A. nerissalis

Binomial name
- Anania nerissalis (Walker, 1859)

Synonyms
- Botys nerissalis Walker, 1859; Botys graviusalis Walker, 1859; Botys nocmonalis Walker, 1859; Botys paolinalis Warren, 1892

Species of moth

Anania nerissalis is a moth in the family Crambidae. It was described by Francis Walker in 1859. It is found in Brazil.
