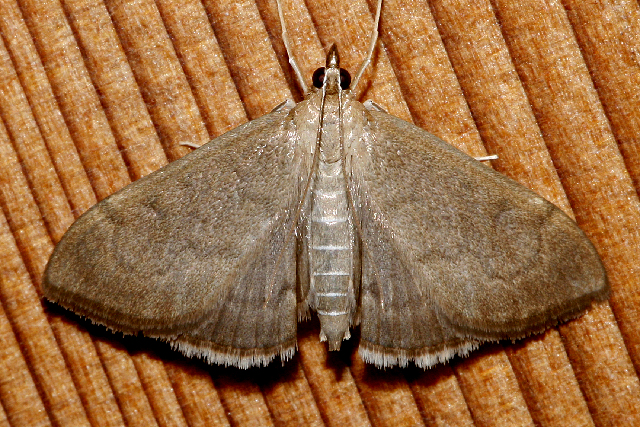

Scientific classification
- Kingdom: Animalia
- Phylum: Arthropoda
- Clade: Pancrustacea
- Class: Insecta
- Order: Lepidoptera
- Family: Crambidae
- Genus: Anania
- Species: A. mysippusalis

Binomial name
- Anania mysippusalis (Walker, 1859)

Synonyms
- Botys mysippusalis Walker, 1859; Mutuuraia mysippusalis; Botys humilalis Lederer, 1863

= Anania mysippusalis =

Species of moth

Anania mysippusalis is a moth in the family Crambidae. It was described by Francis Walker in 1859. It is found in North America, where it has been recorded from Nova Scotia to British Columbia, south in the west to California and Arizona.

The wingspan is about 26 mm. Adults are on wing from May to August in California.
