= Anania pata =

Scientific classification
- Kingdom: Animalia
- Phylum: Arthropoda
- Clade: Pancrustacea
- Class: Insecta
- Order: Lepidoptera
- Family: Crambidae
- Genus: Anania
- Species: A. pata

Binomial name
- Anania pata (Strand, 1918)

Synonyms
- Pyrausta pata Strand, 1918

Species of moth

Anania pata is a moth in the family Crambidae. It was described by Strand in 1918. It is found in Taiwan.
