= Anania aureomarginalis =

Scientific classification
- Kingdom: Animalia
- Phylum: Arthropoda
- Clade: Pancrustacea
- Class: Insecta
- Order: Lepidoptera
- Family: Crambidae
- Genus: Anania
- Species: A. aureomarginalis

Binomial name
- Anania aureomarginalis (Maes, 2012)

Synonyms
- Algedonia aureomarginalis Maes, 2012

Species of moth

Anania aureomarginalis is a moth in the family Crambidae. It was described by Koen V. N. Maes in 2012. It is found in Angola and Zambia.
