= Anania solaris =

Scientific classification
- Kingdom: Animalia
- Phylum: Arthropoda
- Clade: Pancrustacea
- Class: Insecta
- Order: Lepidoptera
- Family: Crambidae
- Genus: Anania
- Species: A. solaris

Binomial name
- Anania solaris (Caradja, 1938)

Synonyms
- Pyrausta solaris Caradja, 1938

Species of moth

Anania solaris is a moth in the family Crambidae. It was described by Aristide Caradja in 1938. It is found in Yunnan, China.
