= Anania intinctalis =

Scientific classification
- Kingdom: Animalia
- Phylum: Arthropoda
- Clade: Pancrustacea
- Class: Insecta
- Order: Lepidoptera
- Family: Crambidae
- Genus: Anania
- Species: A. intinctalis

Binomial name
- Anania intinctalis (Dyar, 1920)

Synonyms
- Pachyzancla intinctalis Dyar, 1920

Species of moth

Anania intinctalis is a moth in the family Crambidae. It was described by Harrison Gray Dyar Jr. in 1920. It is found in Mexico.
