= Anania auricinctalis =

Scientific classification
- Kingdom: Animalia
- Phylum: Arthropoda
- Clade: Pancrustacea
- Class: Insecta
- Order: Lepidoptera
- Family: Crambidae
- Genus: Anania
- Species: A. auricinctalis

Binomial name
- Anania auricinctalis (Hampson, 1918)

Synonyms
- Pyrausta auricinctalis Hampson, 1918

Species of moth

Anania auricinctalis is a moth in the family Crambidae. It was described by George Hampson in 1918. It is found in Kenya.
