= Anania trichoglossa =

Scientific classification
- Kingdom: Animalia
- Phylum: Arthropoda
- Clade: Pancrustacea
- Class: Insecta
- Order: Lepidoptera
- Family: Crambidae
- Genus: Anania
- Species: A. trichoglossa

Binomial name
- Anania trichoglossa (Meyrick, 1936)

Synonyms
- Mnesictena trichoglossa Meyrick, 1936

Species of moth

Anania trichoglossa is a moth in the family Crambidae. It was described by Edward Meyrick in 1936. It is found in Bolivia.
