= Anania piperitalis =

Scientific classification
- Kingdom: Animalia
- Phylum: Arthropoda
- Clade: Pancrustacea
- Class: Insecta
- Order: Lepidoptera
- Family: Crambidae
- Genus: Anania
- Species: A. piperitalis

Binomial name
- Anania piperitalis (Hampson, 1913)

Synonyms
- Pionea piperitalis Hampson, 1913

Species of moth

Anania piperitalis is a moth in the family Crambidae. It was described by George Hampson in 1913. It is found in Angola, Cameroon, the Democratic Republic of the Congo, Kenya and Uganda.
