= Anania explicalis =

Scientific classification
- Kingdom: Animalia
- Phylum: Arthropoda
- Clade: Pancrustacea
- Class: Insecta
- Order: Lepidoptera
- Family: Crambidae
- Genus: Anania
- Species: A. explicalis

Binomial name
- Anania explicalis (Dyar, 1914)

Synonyms
- Pionea explicalis Dyar, 1914

Species of moth

Anania explicalis is a moth in the family Crambidae. It was described by Harrison Gray Dyar Jr. in 1914. It is found in Panama.
