= Anania cuspidata =

Scientific classification
- Kingdom: Animalia
- Phylum: Arthropoda
- Clade: Pancrustacea
- Class: Insecta
- Order: Lepidoptera
- Family: Crambidae
- Genus: Anania
- Species: A. cuspidata

Binomial name
- Anania cuspidata (Zhang, Li & Wang, 2002)

Synonyms
- Proteurrhypara cuspidata Zhang, Li & Wang, 2002

Species of moth

Anania cuspidata is a moth in the family Crambidae. It was described by Zhang, Li and Wang in 2002. It is found in China (Gansu).
