= Anania recreata =

Scientific classification
- Kingdom: Animalia
- Phylum: Arthropoda
- Clade: Pancrustacea
- Class: Insecta
- Order: Lepidoptera
- Family: Crambidae
- Genus: Anania
- Species: A. recreata

Binomial name
- Anania recreata (Meyrick, 1938)

Synonyms
- Phlyctaenia recreata Meyrick, 1938

Species of moth

Anania recreata is a moth in the family Crambidae. It was described by Edward Meyrick in 1938. It is found on Java.
