= Anania hasanensis =

Scientific classification
- Kingdom: Animalia
- Phylum: Arthropoda
- Clade: Pancrustacea
- Class: Insecta
- Order: Lepidoptera
- Family: Crambidae
- Genus: Anania
- Species: A. hasanensis

Binomial name
- Anania hasanensis (Kirpichnikova, 1998)

Synonyms
- Opsibotys hasanensis Kirpichnikova, 1998

Species of moth

Anania hasanensis is a moth in the family Crambidae. It was described by Valentina A. Kirpichnikova in 1998. It is found in Primorsky Krai in the Russian Far East.
