= Anania obliquata =

Scientific classification
- Kingdom: Animalia
- Phylum: Arthropoda
- Clade: Pancrustacea
- Class: Insecta
- Order: Lepidoptera
- Family: Crambidae
- Genus: Anania
- Species: A. obliquata

Binomial name
- Anania obliquata (Moore, 1888)

Synonyms
- Ebulea obliquata Moore, 1888; Leucocraspeda nissoralis C. Swinhoe, 1894

Species of moth

Anania obliquata is a moth in the family Crambidae. It was described by Frederic Moore in 1888. It is found in India.
