= Anania lippensi =

Scientific classification
- Kingdom: Animalia
- Phylum: Arthropoda
- Clade: Pancrustacea
- Class: Insecta
- Order: Lepidoptera
- Family: Crambidae
- Genus: Anania
- Species: A. lippensi

Binomial name
- Anania lippensi (Maes, 1997)

Synonyms
- Ethiobotys lippensi Maes, 1997

Species of moth

Anania lippensi is a moth in the family Crambidae. It was described by Koen V. N. Maes in 1997. It is found in Cameroon.
