= Anania ocellalis =

Scientific classification
- Kingdom: Animalia
- Phylum: Arthropoda
- Clade: Pancrustacea
- Class: Insecta
- Order: Lepidoptera
- Family: Crambidae
- Genus: Anania
- Species: A. ocellalis

Binomial name
- Anania ocellalis (Warren, 1892)

Synonyms
- Opsibotys ocellalis Warren, 1892; Eurrhypara ocellalis; Proteurrhypara ocellalis apoialis Munroe & Mutuura, 1969; Anania ocellaris; Pyrausta discimaculalis Hampson, 1900

Species of moth

Anania ocellalis is a moth in the family Crambidae. It was described by Warren in 1892. It is found in the Russian Far East and Japan.
