= Anania cervinalis =

Scientific classification
- Kingdom: Animalia
- Phylum: Arthropoda
- Clade: Pancrustacea
- Class: Insecta
- Order: Lepidoptera
- Family: Crambidae
- Genus: Anania
- Species: A. cervinalis

Binomial name
- Anania cervinalis (Warren, 1892)

Synonyms
- Agrammia cervinalis Warren, 1892

Species of moth

Anania cervinalis is a moth in the family Crambidae. It was described by Warren in 1892. It is found in Brazil (São Paulo).
