= Anania testacealis =

Scientific classification
- Kingdom: Animalia
- Phylum: Arthropoda
- Clade: Pancrustacea
- Class: Insecta
- Order: Lepidoptera
- Family: Crambidae
- Genus: Anania
- Species: A. testacealis

Binomial name
- Anania testacealis (Zeller, 1847)

Synonyms
- Botys testacealis Zeller, 1847; Ebulea testacealis; Ebulea crocealis var. oxybialis Millière, 1872; Ebulea rubetralis Guenée, 1854

Species of moth

Anania testacealis is a species of moth in the family Crambidae. It is found in Spain, France, Italy, Austria, the Czech Republic, Slovakia, Hungary, Croatia, Bosnia and Herzegovina, Romania, Ukraine, the Republic of Macedonia and Greece.
