= Anania metaleuca =

Scientific classification
- Kingdom: Animalia
- Phylum: Arthropoda
- Clade: Pancrustacea
- Class: Insecta
- Order: Lepidoptera
- Family: Crambidae
- Genus: Anania
- Species: A. metaleuca

Binomial name
- Anania metaleuca (Hampson, 1913)

Synonyms
- Pyrausta metaleuca Hampson, 1913

Species of moth

Anania metaleuca is a moth in the family Crambidae. It was described by George Hampson in 1913. It is found in Tanzania.
