= Anania occidentalis =

Scientific classification
- Kingdom: Animalia
- Phylum: Arthropoda
- Clade: Pancrustacea
- Class: Insecta
- Order: Lepidoptera
- Family: Crambidae
- Genus: Anania
- Species: A. occidentalis

Binomial name
- Anania occidentalis (Munroe & Mutuura, 1969)

Synonyms
- Proteurrhypara occidentalis Munroe & Mutuura, 1969

Species of moth

Anania occidentalis is a moth in the family Crambidae. It was described by Eugene G. Munroe and Akira Mutuura in 1969. It is found in Yunnan, China.
