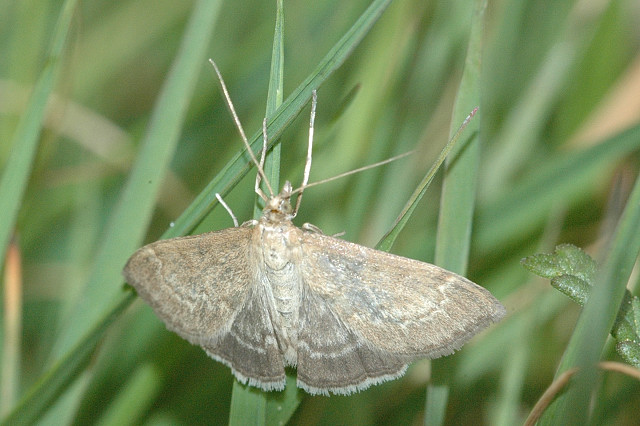

Scientific classification
- Kingdom: Animalia
- Phylum: Arthropoda
- Clade: Pancrustacea
- Class: Insecta
- Order: Lepidoptera
- Family: Crambidae
- Genus: Anania
- Species: A. fuscalis

Binomial name
- Anania fuscalis ([Denis & Schiffermüller], 1775)

Synonyms
- Pyralis fuscalis Denis & Schiffermüller, 1775; Opsibotys fuscalis; Botys deceptalis La Harpe, 1864; Anania fuscalis cineralis (Fabricius, 1794); Pyralis cineralis Hübner, 1796; Margaritia pulveralis Stephens, 1834; Anania fuscalis perfuscalis (Munroe & Mutuura, 1969); Psamotis fimbrialis Stephens, 1834; Pyralis julialis Schrank, 1802; Pyrausta fuscalis var. sibirica Caradja, 1916

= Anania fuscalis =

Species of moth

Anania fuscalis is a species of moth of the family Crambidae. It is found in Europe.

The wingspan is 20–26 mm. The forewings are grey, slightly yellowish tinged; lines darker grey, first indistinct, hardly curved, second serrate, strongly curved in disc, with an abrupt sinuation inwards below middle, posteriorly obscurely whitish edged, more strongly on costa; orbicular dot and transverse discal mark indistinct, darker grey. Hindwings are pale grey, yellowish-tinged; two very faint discal dots; second line as in forewings; a darker grey terminal band.T he larva is rather dark fuscous; dorsal line darker; spiracular area pale brownish; head and plate of 2 blackish -brown. See also Parsons et al.

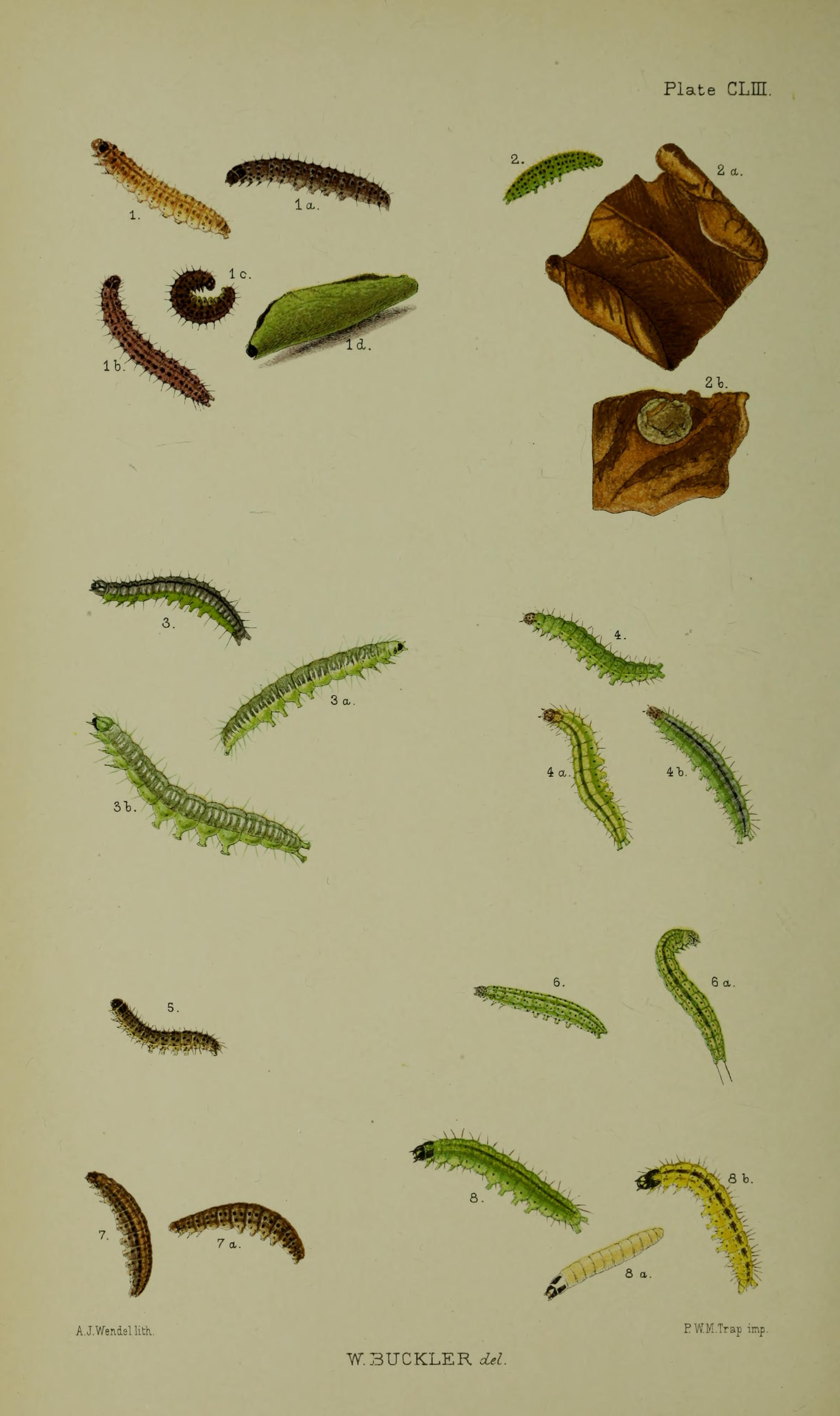
Figs. 5 larva after final moult

The moth flies from May to July depending on the location.

The larvae feed on Rhinanthus minor and Melampyrum pratense, but also Solidago, Urtica, Lathyrus and Pedicularis species.
