= Anania ademonalis =

Scientific classification
- Kingdom: Animalia
- Phylum: Arthropoda
- Clade: Pancrustacea
- Class: Insecta
- Order: Lepidoptera
- Family: Crambidae
- Genus: Anania
- Species: A. ademonalis

Binomial name
- Anania ademonalis (Walker, 1859)

Synonyms
- Pionea ademonalis Walker, 1859

Species of moth

Anania ademonalis is a moth in the family Crambidae. It was described by Francis Walker in 1859. It is found in Rio de Janeiro, Brazil.
