= Anania luteorubralis =

Scientific classification
- Kingdom: Animalia
- Phylum: Arthropoda
- Clade: Pancrustacea
- Class: Insecta
- Order: Lepidoptera
- Family: Crambidae
- Genus: Anania
- Species: A. luteorubralis

Binomial name
- Anania luteorubralis (Caradja, 1916)

Synonyms
- Pyrausta luteorubralis Caradja, 1916

Species of moth

Anania luteorubralis is a moth in the family Crambidae. It was described by Aristide Caradja in 1916. It is found in Xinjiang, China.
