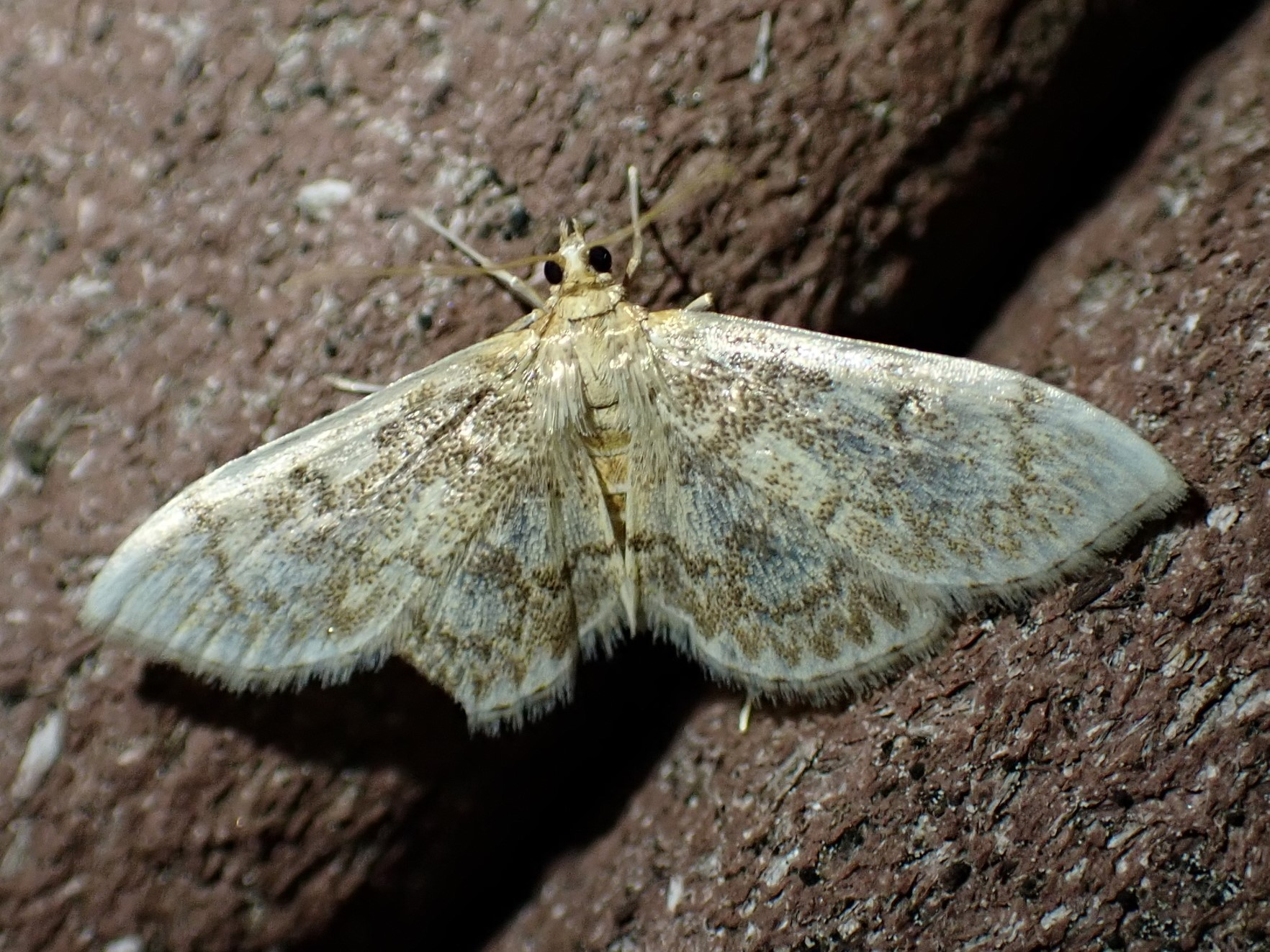

Scientific classification
- Kingdom: Animalia
- Phylum: Arthropoda
- Clade: Pancrustacea
- Class: Insecta
- Order: Lepidoptera
- Family: Crambidae
- Genus: Anania
- Species: A. quebecensis

Binomial name
- Anania quebecensis (Munroe, 1954)

Synonyms
- Phlyctaenia quebecensis Munroe, 1954

= Anania quebecensis =

Species of moth

Anania quebecensis, the Quebec phlyctaenia moth, is a species of moth in the family Crambidae. It was first described by Eugene G. Munroe in 1954. It is found in North America, where it has been recorded from Ontario to Nova Scotia and Maine, south to Maryland and Virginia.
