= Anania tennesseensis =

Scientific classification
- Kingdom: Animalia
- Phylum: Arthropoda
- Clade: Pancrustacea
- Class: Insecta
- Order: Lepidoptera
- Family: Crambidae
- Genus: Anania
- Species: A. tennesseensis

Binomial name
- Anania tennesseensis Yang in Yang, Landry, Handfield, Zhang, Solis, Handfield, Scholtens, Mutanen, Nuss & Hebert, 2012

Species of moth

Anania tennesseensis is a moth in the family Crambidae. It was described by Yang in 2012. It is found in North America, where it has been recorded from Tennessee.
