= Jay N. Anania =

American diplomat

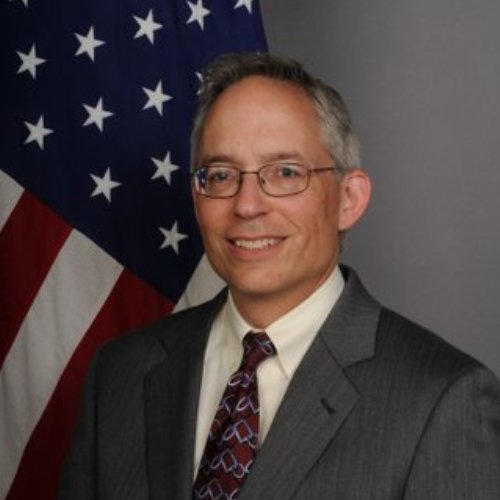
Jay Anania, circa 2012

Jay Nicholas Anania (born 1959) was the American Ambassador to Suriname from November 15, 2012 to October 2, 2015. He was COO at the Organization of American States (OAS) and is director of foreign affairs at Buchanan & Edwards.

== Education ==
Anania graduated from Kenyon College, earning a bachelor's degree in history and master's degree in business administration and management from the University of North Carolina at Chapel Hill.

== Publications ==
- E-Hell: Is at here a Way Out?
