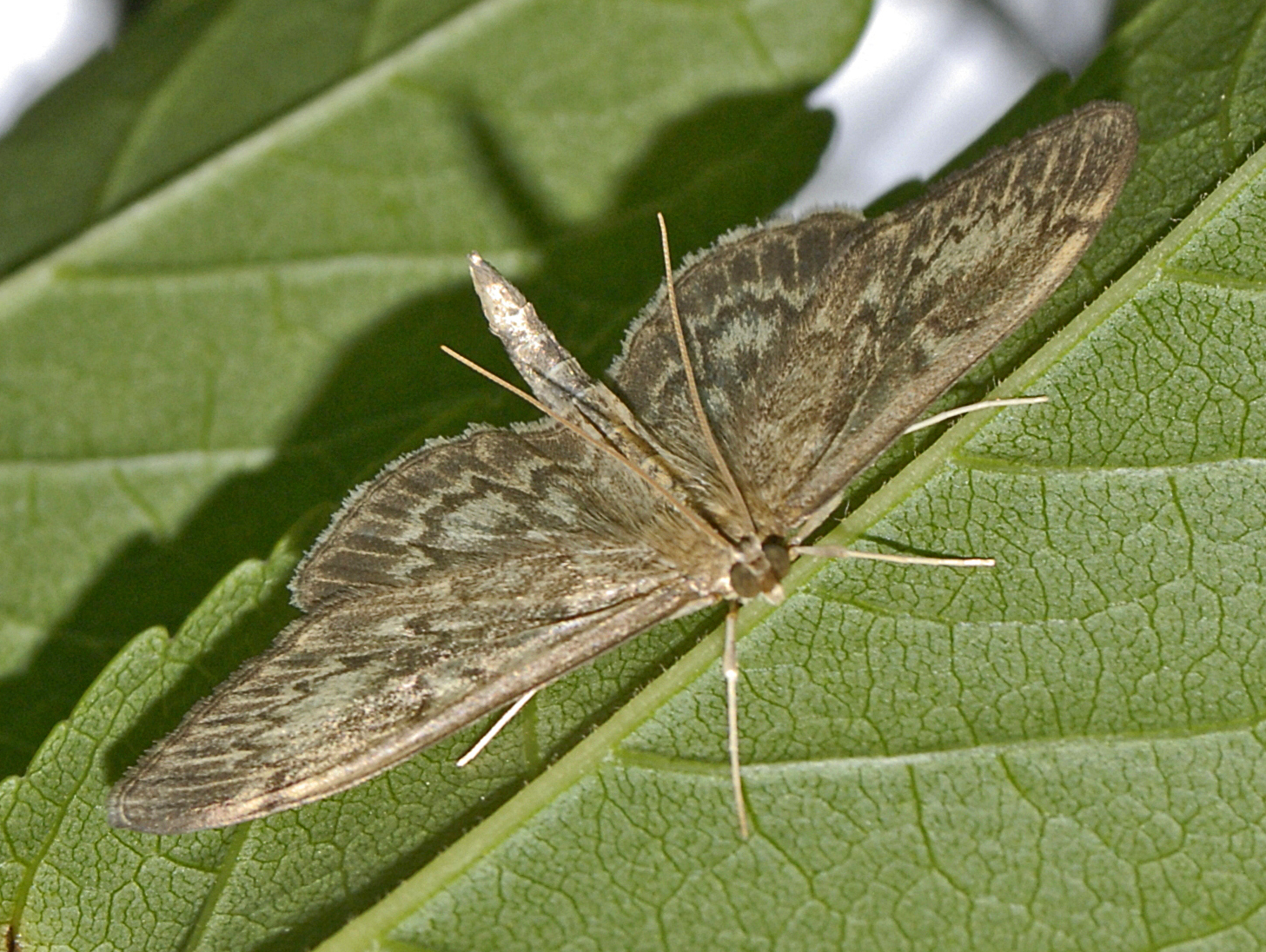
- Dorsal view
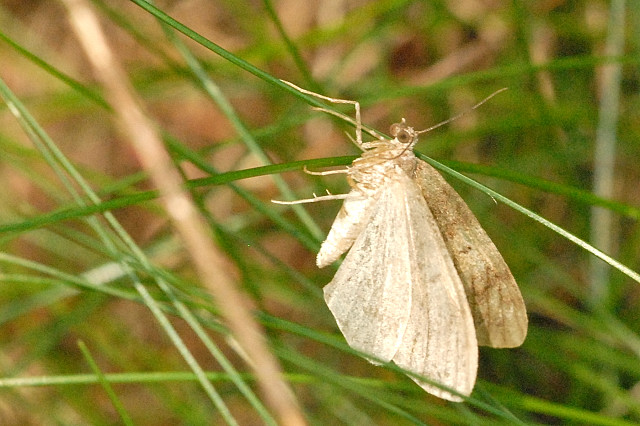
- Lateral view

Scientific classification
- Kingdom: Animalia
- Phylum: Arthropoda
- Clade: Pancrustacea
- Class: Insecta
- Order: Lepidoptera
- Family: Crambidae
- Genus: Anania
- Species: A. lancealis

Binomial name
- Anania lancealis (Denis & Schiffermüller, 1775)

Synonyms
- List: Perinephela lancealis Denis & Schiffermüller, 1775; Pyralis lancealis Denis & Schiffermüller, 1775; Anania lancealis bergmani (Munroe & Mutuura, 1968); Anania lancealis honshuensis (Munroe & Mutuura, 1968); Phalaena glabralis Fabricius, 1794; Phalaena palustrata Fabricius, 1794; Anania lancealis pryeri (Munroe & Mutuura, 1968); Anania lancealis sinensis (Munroe & Mutuura, 1968); Anania lancealis taiwanensis (Munroe & Mutuura, 1968)

= Anania lancealis =

Species of moth

Anania lancealis is a species of moth of the family Crambidae, described by the Austrian lepidopterists Michael Denis and Ignaz Schiffermüller in 1775. The moth is found in Asia and Europe.

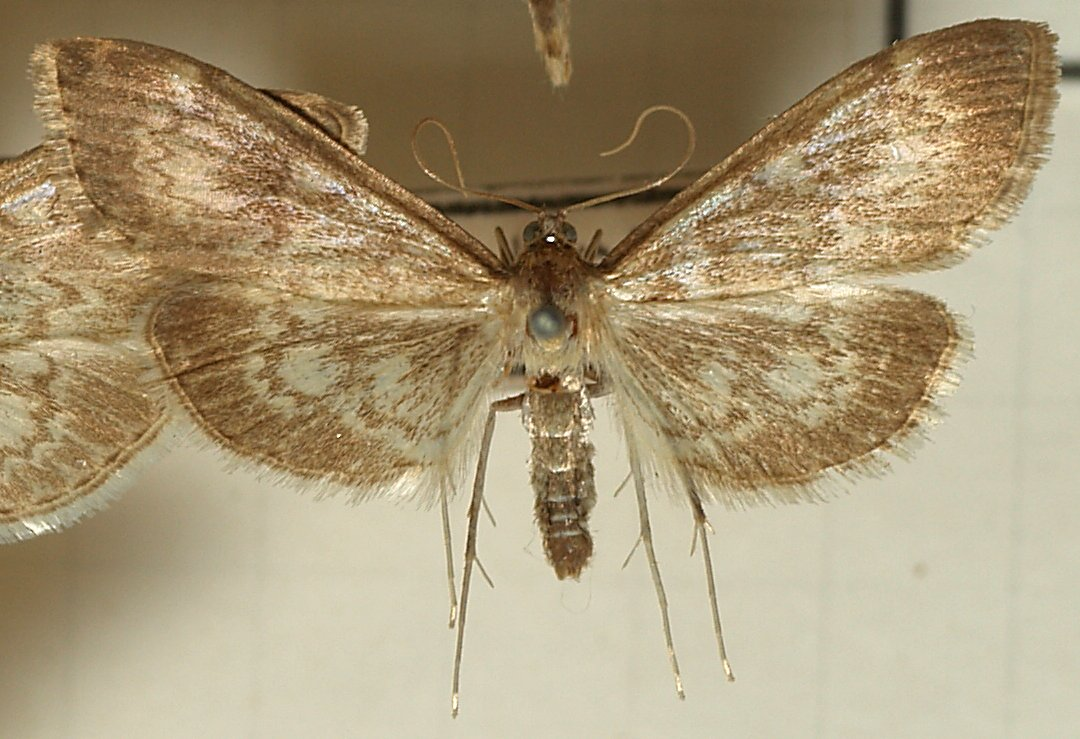
Mounted specimen

== Subspecies ==
- Anania lancealis lancealis
- Anania lancealis bergmani
- Anania lancealis honshuensis
- Anania lancealis pryeri
- Anania lancealis sinensis
- Anania lancealis taiwanensis

== Description ==
The wingspan of Anania lancealis can reach 30–34 mm. Its forewings are long and narrow, especially in males. The upperside of the wings is whitish, with brown lines and patches. Meyrick - Forewings whitish ochreous, mostly suffused with fuscous-grey; lines dark fuscous, first irregular, second serrate, curved, indented below middle, preceded by a clear blotch in disc and edged posteriorly by a clear line; small dark fuscous orbicular and discal marks, separated by a clear patch. Hindwings as forewings, but anterior markings absent. Larva green; dorsal line darker, broadly edged with grey-whitish or grey; spiracular whitish; head pale brownish, dark-speckled. See also Parsons et al.

These moths fly at dusk from May to mid-August depending on the location.

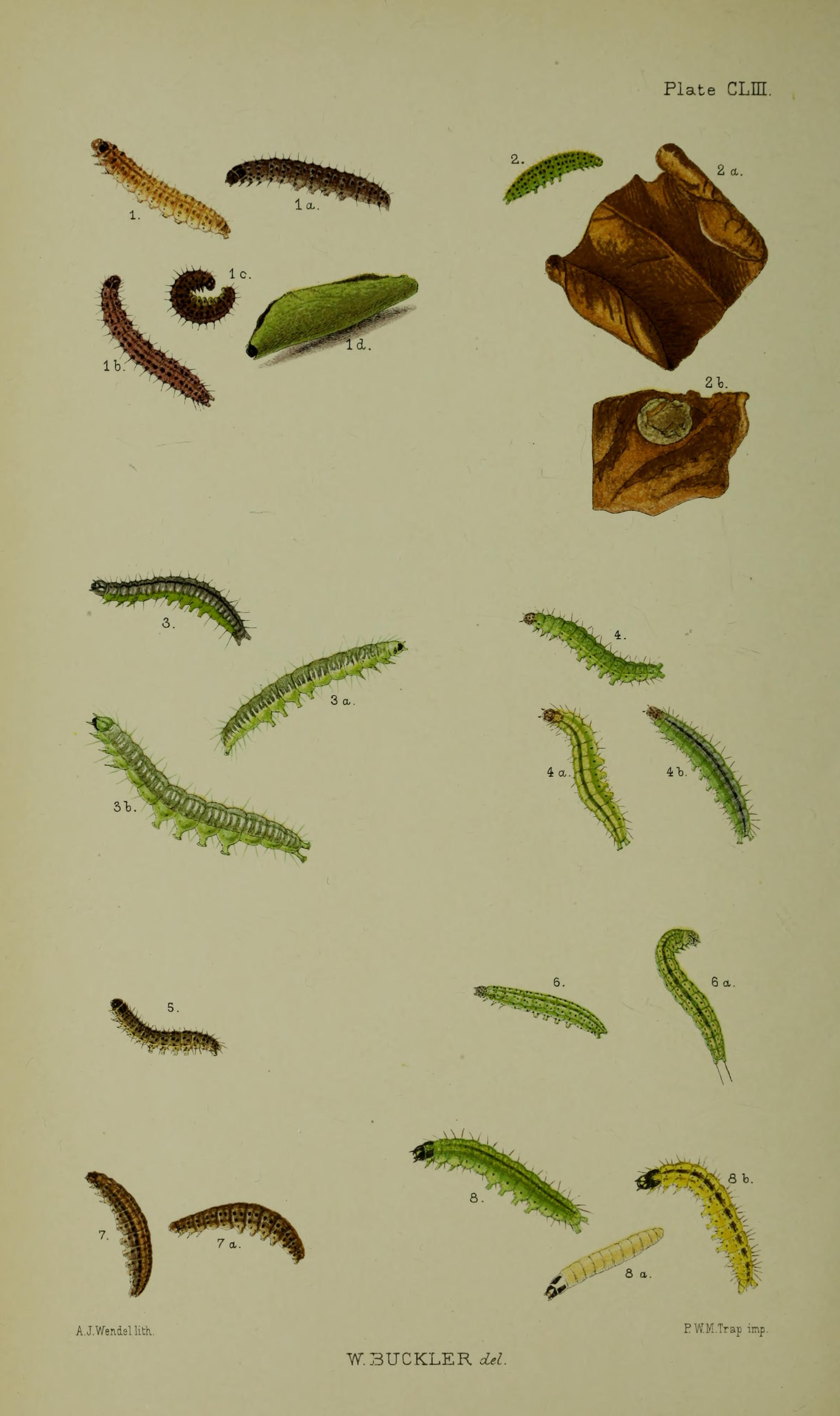
Figs. 4, 4a, 4b larva after final moult

The larvae feed on hemp agrimony (Eupatorium cannabinum), but is also reported on ragwort (Jacobaea vulgaris), wood sage (Teucrium scorodonia), greater water-parsnip (Sium latifolium) and woundworts (Stachys species). They pupate in a silken cocoon in which they also hibernate.

== Distribution and habitat ==
This species can be found in the Palearctic including most of Europe. It prefers woodland and marshy fenland.
