= Ananías Maidana =

Paraguayan political activist (1923–2010)

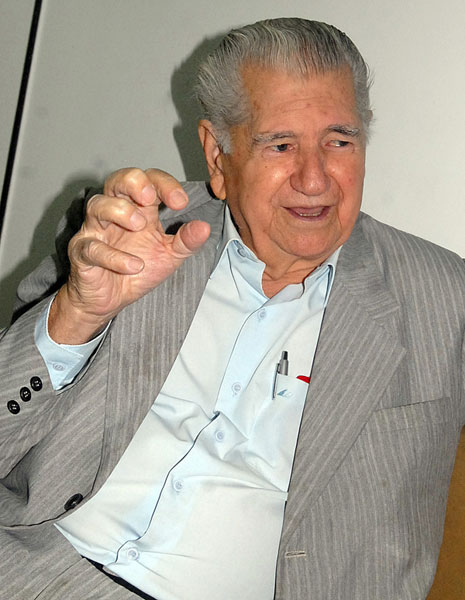
- Born: 26 July 1923; Encarnación, Paraguay
- Died: 30 October 2010 (aged 87); Asunción, Paraguay
- Occupations: Politician, writer, teacher

Ananías Maidana (26 July 1923 – 30 October 2010) was a teacher and politician born in 1923 in Encarnación, Paraguay. For years he was a political prisoner under the dictatorship of Alfredo Stroessner. He later became secretary-general of the Paraguayan Communist Party, and in the 2008 election he was a candidate for the senate for the Socialist Patriotic Alliance, the political coalition in which the PCP participated.

== Death ==
Maidana died of prostate cancer on 30 October 2010, aged 87, in the capital of Paraguay, Asunción.

== Sources ==
- BONZI, Antonio, "Proceso histórico del Partido Comunista Paraguayo (Un itinerario de luces y sombras)", Arandura Editorial, Asunción 2001.
