= Ananius =

6th-century Greek poet

Ananius (Greek: Ἀνάνιος) was a Greek iambic poet, contemporary with Hipponax (about 540 BCE). The invention of the satyric iambic verse called Scazon is ascribed to him as well as to Hipponax. Some fragments of Ananius are preserved by Athenaeus, and all that is known of him was collected by Friedrich Gottlieb Welcker in the 19th century.
