= Anania tertialis =

Scientific classification
- Kingdom: Animalia
- Phylum: Arthropoda
- Clade: Pancrustacea
- Class: Insecta
- Order: Lepidoptera
- Family: Crambidae
- Genus: Anania
- Species: A. tertialis

Binomial name
- Anania tertialis (Guenée, 1854)

Synonyms
- Ebulea tertialis Guenée, 1854; Botys syringicola Packard, 1870

Species of moth

Anania tertialis is a species of moth in the family Crambidae. It was described by Achille Guenée in 1854. It is found in North America.
