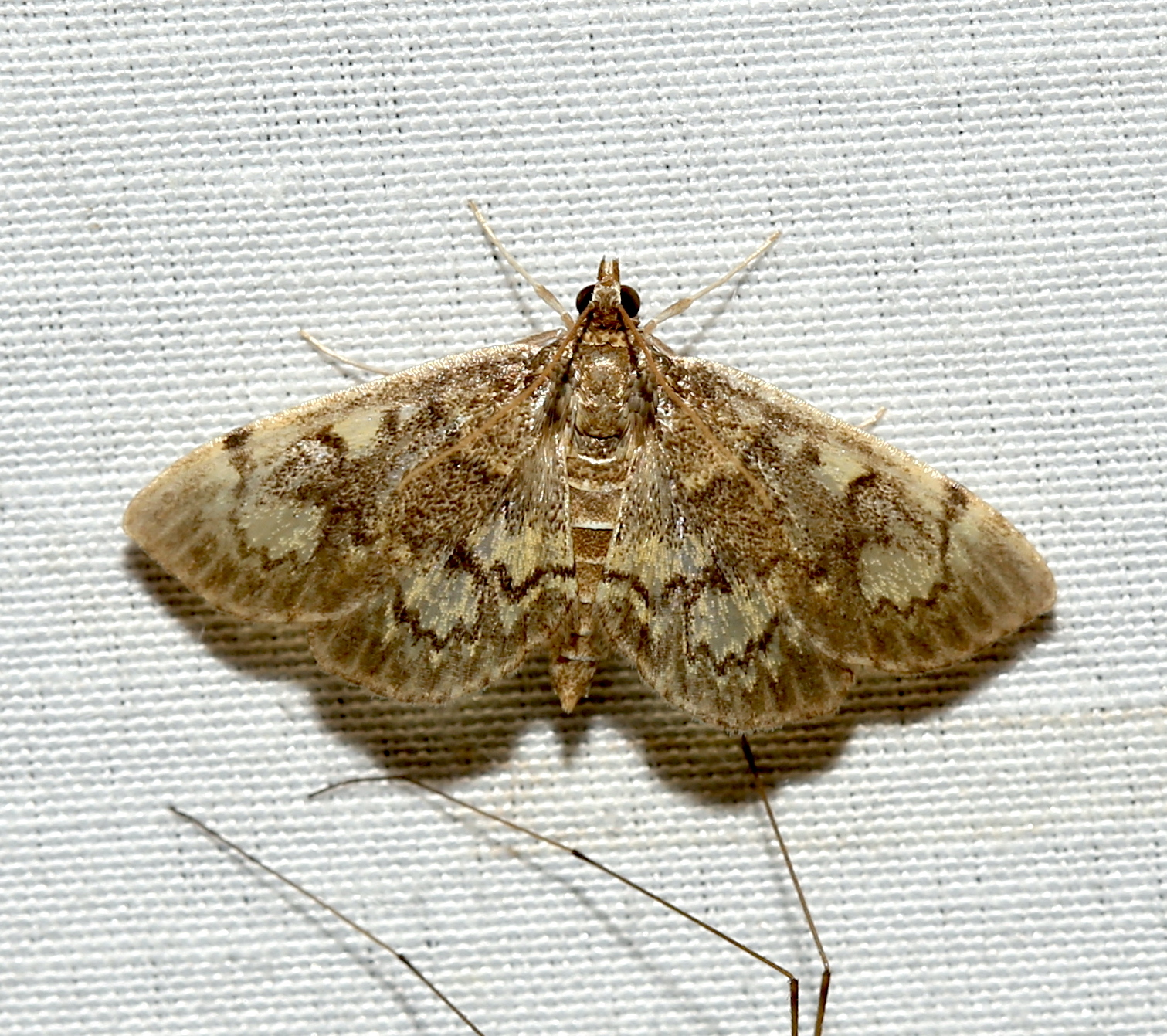

Scientific classification
- Kingdom: Animalia
- Phylum: Arthropoda
- Clade: Pancrustacea
- Class: Insecta
- Order: Lepidoptera
- Family: Crambidae
- Genus: Anania
- Species: A. plectilis

Binomial name
- Anania plectilis (Grote & Robinson, 1867)

Synonyms
- Botys plectilis Grote & Robinson, 1867

= Anania plectilis =

Species of moth

Anania plectilis is a moth in the family Crambidae. It was described by Augustus Radcliffe Grote and Coleman Townsend Robinson in 1867. It is found in North America.
