= Anania (foraminifera) =

Anania Temporal range: Middle Albian–Late Albian 113.0–100.5 Ma

Scientific classification
- Domain: Eukaryota
- Clade: Sar
- Clade: Rhizaria
- Phylum: Foraminifera
- Class: Globothalamea
- Order: †Globotruncanida
- Family: †Ananiidae
- Genus: †Anania; El-Nakhal 2010

Type species
- Anania caronae El-Nakhal 2010

Species
- A. caronae; A. shobairi

Genus of fossil microscopic eukaryotes

Anania is an extinct genus of foraminifera of the family Ananiidae, order Globotruncanida. It was described in 2010 by Hamed El-Nakhal, and was initially classified in the new subfamily Ananiinae of the family Abathomphalidae. Later, the subfamily was raised to the rank of the family Ananiidae and placed in the superfamily Hedbergelloidea.

== Description ==
Anania is characterized by the presence of globular chambers and supplementary sutural apertures on the umbilical side. Their test is free, trochospirally enrolled, and umbilicate. The equatorial periphery is lobate, while the axial periphery is rounded with no indication of a margin without keel or pores. The chambers are globular throughout, and inflated. The sutures are straight, radially depressed on both sides. The umbilicus is narrow. The primary aperture is single, umbilical to extraumbilical, and has a bordering lip. The surface is rugose, covered with meridionally arranged pustules and costellae on one or both sides. The wall is calcareous, hyaline radial in structure, and perforated. The lips and surface rugosity are generally without pores.

== Classification ==
Two species belong to the genus Anania:

- Anania caronae El-Nakhal 2010
- Anania shobairi El-Nakhal 2010
