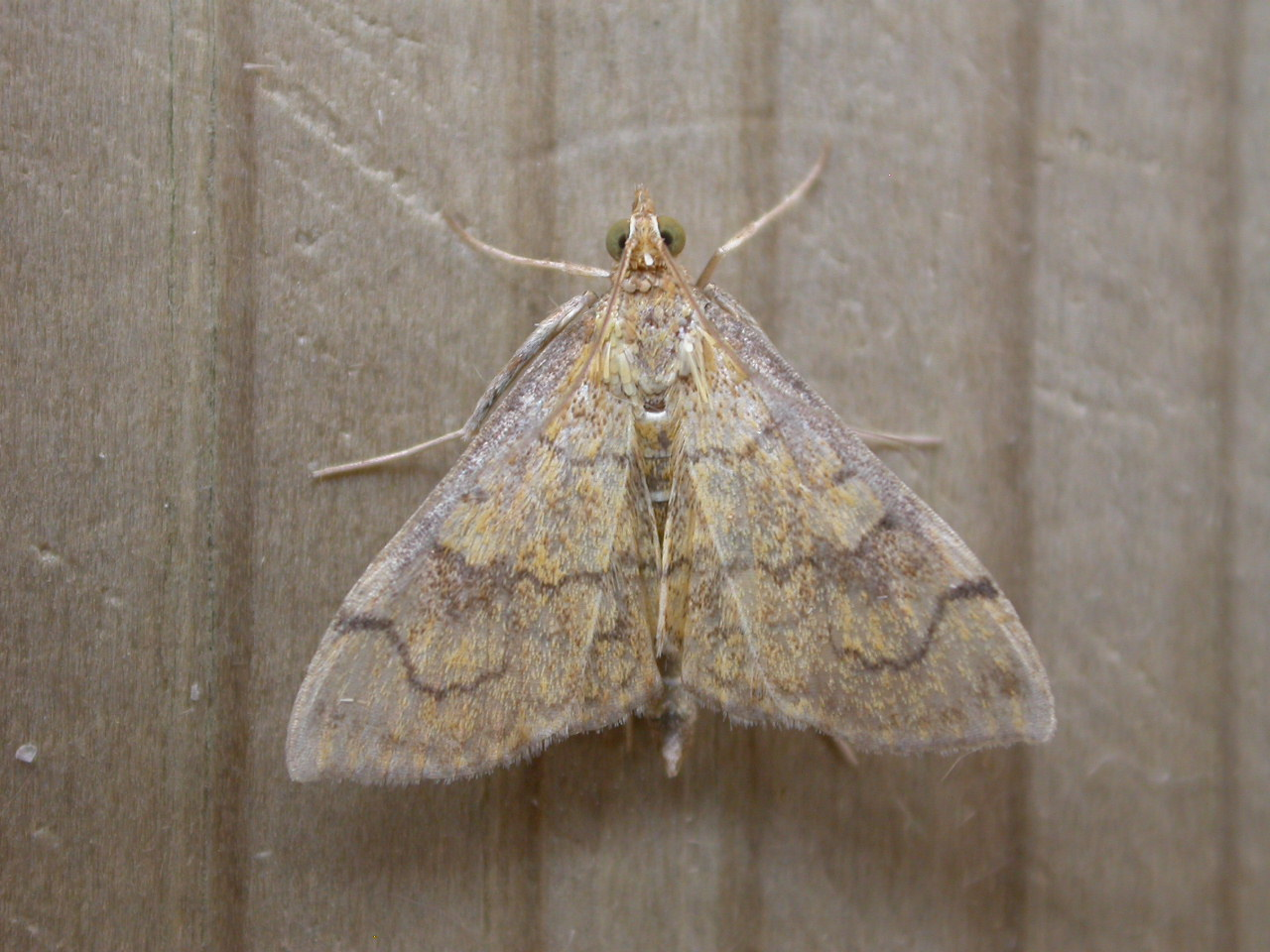
- Anania verbascalis

Scientific classification
- Kingdom: Animalia
- Phylum: Arthropoda
- Clade: Pancrustacea
- Class: Insecta
- Order: Lepidoptera
- Family: Crambidae
- Subfamily: Pyraustinae
- Genus: Anania; Hübner, 1823

Synonyms
- Algedonia Lederer, 1863; Mutuuraia Munroe, 1976; Nealgedonia Munroe, 1976; Ametasia M. O. Martin, 1986; Ebulea Doubleday, 1849; Ennychia Treitschke, 1828; Ennichia Duponchel, 1833; Ethiobotys Maes, 1997; Eurrhypara Hübner, 1825; Palpita Hübner, 1806; Proteurrhypara Munroe & Mutuura, 1969; Opsibotys Warren, 1890; Perinephela Hübner, 1825; Perinephele Hübner, 1826; Perinephila Hampson, 1897; Phlyctaenia Hübner, 1825; Polyctaenia Hübner, 1826; Pronomis Munroe & Mutuura, 1968; Tenerobotys Munroe & Mutuura, 1971; Trichovalva Amsel, 1956; Udonomeiga Mutuura, 1954

= Anania (moth) =

Genus of moths

Anania is a genus of moths of the family Crambidae described by Jacob Hübner in 1823.

== Species ==
- Anania acutalis (Dognin, 1905)
- Anania ademonalis (Walker, 1859)
- Anania albeoverbascalis Yamanaka, 1966
- Anania alta (Maes, 2005)
- Anania amaniensis (Maes, 1997)
- Anania amphinephela (Meyrick, 1933)
- Anania ankolae (Maes, 1997)
- Anania antigastridia (Hampson, 1899)
- Anania arenacea (Warren, 1892)
- Anania aurea (Butler, 1875)
- Anania aureomarginalis (Maes, 2012)
- Anania auricinctalis (Hampson, 1918)
- Anania austa (Strand, 1918)
- Anania bifossata (Hampson, 1918)
- Anania bryalis (Hampson, 1918)
- Anania camerounensis (Maes, 1997)
- Anania caudatella (Dyar, 1912)
- Anania cervinalis (Warren, 1892)
- Anania chekiangensis (Munroe & Mutuura, 1969)
- Anania conisanalis (Hampson, 1918)
- Anania contentalis (Schaus, 1912)
- Anania coronata (Hufnagel, 1767)
- Anania coronatoides (Inoue, 1960)
- Anania crocealis (Hübner, 1796)
- Anania cuspidata (Zhang, Li & Wang, 2002)
- Anania delicatalis (South in Leech & South, 1901)
- Anania desistalis (Walker, 1862)
- Anania dichroma (Moore, 1888)
- Anania egentalis (Christoph, 1881)
- Anania elutalis (Kenrick, 1917)
- Anania epanthisma (Dyar, 1914)
- Anania epicroca (Lower, 1903)
- Anania epipaschialis (Hampson, 1912)
- Anania explicalis (Dyar, 1914)
- Anania extricalis (Guenée, 1854)
- Anania federalis (Capps, 1967)
- Anania ferruginealis (Warren, 1892)
- Anania flava (Maes, 2005)
- Anania flavicolor (Munroe & Mutuura, 1968)
- Anania flavidecoralis (Munroe & Mutuura, 1969)
- Anania flavimacularis (Zhang, Li & Song, 2002)
- Anania flavipartalis (Hampson, 1918)
- Anania flavomarginalis (Maes, 2005)
- Anania fovifera (Hampson, 1913)
- Anania funebris (Ström, 1768)
- Anania fusalis (Hampson, 1912)
- Anania fuscalis (Denis & Schiffermüller, 1775)
- Anania fuscobrunnealis (South in Leech & South, 1901)
- Anania fuscofulvalis Yamanaka, 2000
- Anania glaucostigmalis (Hampson, 1918)
- Anania gobini (Maes, 2005)
- Anania gracilis (Maes, 2005)
- Anania griseofascialis Maes, 2003
- Anania hasanensis (Kirpichnikova, 1998)
- Anania hortulata (Linnaeus, 1758)
- Anania hyalactis (Dognin, 1905)
- Anania ieralis (Kaye, 1925)
- Anania impunctata (Warren, 1897)
- Anania inclusalis (Walker, 1866)
- Anania intinctalis (Dyar, 1920)
- Anania labeculalis (Hulst, 1886)
- Anania lancealis (Denis & Schiffermüller, 1775)
- Anania ledereri (Amsel, 1956)
- Anania leucocraspia (Hampson, 1899)
- Anania leuschneri (Munroe, 1976)
- Anania lippensi (Maes, 1997)
- Anania lobibasalis (Hampson, 1918)
- Anania luctualis (Hübner, 1796)
- Anania lutealis (Warren, 1892)
- Anania luteorubralis (Caradja, 1916)
- Anania lysanderalis (Walker, 1859)
- Anania melastictalis (Hampson, 1913)
- Anania mesophaealis (Hampson, 1913)
- Anania metaleuca (Hampson, 1913)
- Anania monospila (Hampson, 1913)
- Anania murcialis (Ragonot, 1895)
- Anania mysippusalis (Walker, 1859)
- Anania nerissalis (Walker, 1859)
- Anania nullalis (Guenée, 1854)
- Anania oberthuri (Turati, 1913)
- Anania obliquata (Moore, 1888)
- Anania obtusalis (Yamanaka, 1987)
- Anania occidentalis (Munroe & Mutuura, 1969)
- Anania ocellalis (Warren, 1892)
- Anania ochriscriptalis (Marion & Viette, 1956)
- Anania ochrofascialis (Christoph, 1882)
- Anania otiosalis (Lederer, 1863)
- Anania pata (Strand, 1918)
- Anania perflavalis (Hampson, 1913)
- Anania perlucidalis (Hübner, 1800–1809)
- Anania phaeopastalis (Hampson, 1913)
- Anania piperitalis (Hampson, 1913)
- Anania plectilis (Grote & Robinson, 1867)
- Anania powysae (Maes, 2005)
- Anania profusalis (Warren, 1896)
- Anania pulverulenta (Warren, 1892)
- Anania quebecensis (Munroe, 1954)
- Anania recreata (Meyrick, 1938)
- Anania rudalis (Zerny, 1939)
- Anania ruwenzoriensis (Maes, 1997)
- Anania shafferi (Speidel & Hanigk, 1990)
- Anania shanxiensis Yang & Landry, 2019
- Anania solaris (Caradja, 1938)
- Anania stachydalis (Zincken in Germar, E. F., 1821)
- Anania subfumalis (Munroe & Mutuura, 1971)
- Anania subochralis (Dognin, 1905)
- Anania taitensis (Maes, 2005)
- Anania teneralis (Caradja, 1939)
- Anania tennesseensis Yang in Yang, Landry, Handfield, Zhang, Solis, Handfield, Scholtens, Mutanen, Nuss & Hebert, 2012
- Anania terrealis (Treitschke, 1829)
- Anania tertialis (Guenée, 1854)
- Anania testacealis (Zeller, 1847)
- Anania trichoglossa (Meyrick, 1936)
- Anania tripartalis (Hampson, 1899)
- Anania verbascalis (Denis & Schiffermüller, 1775)
- Anania vicinalis (South in Leech & South, 1901)

== Former species ==
- Anania gyralis (Hulst, 1886)
