= List of moths of Japan (Pyraloidea-Drepanoidea) =

Partial list of Japanese moths

This is a list of the Japanese species of the superfamilies Pyraloidea, Cimelioidea, Calliduloidae and Drepanoidea. It also acts as an index to the species articles and forms part of the full List of moths of Japan.

== Pyralidae ==
- ハチノスツヅリガ — Galleria mellonella (Linnaeus, 1758)
- コハチノスツヅリガ — Achroia grisella (Fabricius, 1794)
- ウスグロツヅリガ — Achroia innotata obscurevittella Ragonot, 1901
- チャマダラツヅリガ — Cathayia obliquella Hampson, 1901
- マエグロツヅリガ — Cataprosopus monstrosus Butler, 1881
- フタスジツヅリガ — Eulophopalpia pauperalis (Leech, 1889)
- キイロツヅリガ — Tirathaba irrufatella Ragonot, 1901
- シタキツヅリガ — Tirathaba mundella Walker, 1864
- オオツヅリガ — Melissoblaptes zelleri (de Joannis, 1932)
- フタテンツヅリガ — Aphomia sapozhnikovi (Krulikowski, 1909)
- クロモンツヅリガ — Doloessa ochrociliella (Ragonot, 1893)
- ミドリツヅリガ — Doloessa viridis Zeller, 1848
- ウスモンツヅリガ — Lamoria adaptella (Walker, 1863)
- アカフツヅリガ — Lamoria glaucalis Caradja, 1925
- ハネナガツヅリガ — Lamoria infumatella Hampson, 1898
- アワノツヅリガ — Mampava bipunctella Ragonot, 1888
- ツヅリガ — Paralipsa gularis (Zeller, 1877)
- オオシマモンツヅリガ — Thalamorrhyncha cramboides Inoue, 1996
- シマモンツヅリガ — Thalamorrhyncha isoneura Meyrick, 1933
- ガイマイツヅリガ — Corcyra cephalonica (Stainton, 1866)
- コメシマメイガ — Aglossa dimidiata (Haworth, 1810)
- ウスモンマルバシマメイガ — Hypsopygia kawabei Yamanaka, 1965
- モモイロシマメイガ — Hypsopygia mauritialis (Boisduval, 1833)
- ウスムラサキシマメイガ — Hypsopygia postflava (Hampson, 1893)
- トビイロシマメイガ — Hypsopygia regina (Butler, 1879)
- シロモンシマメイガ — Pyralis albiguttata Warren, 1891
- カシノシマメイガ — Pyralis farinalis (Linnaeus, 1758)
- ネッタイシマメイガ — Pyralis manihotalis Guenée, 1854
- ネグロシマメイガ — Pyralis pictalis (Curtis, 1834)
- ギンモンシマメイガ — Pyralis regalis [Denis & Schiffermüller], 1775
- ムラサキシマメイガ — Scenedra umbrosalis (Wileman, 1911)
- ニセマエモンシマメイガ — Stemmatophora albifimbrialis (Hampson, 1906)
- トビイロフタスジシマメイガ — Stemmatophora valida (Butler, 1879)
- ナカアカシマメイガ — Tamraca torridalis (Lederer, 1863)
- マエモンシマメイガ — Tegulifera bicoloralis (Leech, 1889)
- チビシマメイガ — Tegulifera faviusalis (Walker, 1859)
- ヒトスジシマメイガ — Bostra mirifica Inoue, 1985
- ヒメアカシマメイガ — Bostra nanalis (Wileman, 1911)
- フタスジシマメイガ — Orthopygia glaucinalis (Linnaeus, 1758)
- コナフキアカシマメイガ — Orthopygia igniflualis (Walker, 1859)
- ツマアカシマメイガ — Orthopygia nannodes (Butler, 1879)
- ツマキシマメイガ — Orthopygia placens (Butler, 1879)
- クロスジキシマメイガ — Orthopygia repetita (Butler, 1887)
- アカヘリシマメイガ — Herculia drabicilialis Yamanaka, 1968
- エゾシマメイガ — Herculia jezoensis Shibuya, 1928
- オオバシマメイガ — Herculia orthogramma Inoue, 1960
- アカシマメイガ — Herculia pelasgalis (Walker, 1859)
- ヤマモトシマメイガ — Minooa yamamotoi Yamanaka, 1996
- キガシラシマメイガ — Trebania flavifrontalis (Leech, 1889)
- クシヒゲシマメイガ — Sybrida approximans (Leech, [1889])
- オオクシヒゲシマメイガ — Datanoides fasciata Butler, 1878
- ミサキクシヒゲシマメイガ — Datanoides misakiensis (Shibuya, 1928)
- ツマグロシマメイガ — Arippara indicator Walker, 1864
- キンボシシマメイガ — Orybina regalis (Leech, 1889)
- ニシキシマメイガ — Mimicia pseudolibatrix (Caradja, 1925)
- クンジシマメイガ — Vitessa pyraliata triangulifera Munroe & Shaffer, 1980
- シロオビトガリメイガ — Endotricha aculeatalis Inoue, 1982
- ウスオビトガリメイガ — Endotricha consocia (Butler, 1879)
- シロスジトガリメイガ — Endotricha costaemaculalis costaemaculalis Christoph, 1881
- キオビトガリメイガ — Endotricha flavofascialis affinialis South, 1901
- オオウスベニトガリメイガ — Endotricha icelusalis (Walker, 1859)
- イノウエトガリメイガ — Endotricha inouei Yoshiyasu, 1987
- キモントガリメイガ — Endotricha kuznetzovi Whalley, 1963
- キベリトガリメイガ — Endotricha minialis (Fabricius, 1794)
- ウスベニトガリメイガ — Endotricha olivacealis (Bremer, 1864)
- キバネトガリメイガ — Endotricha pulverealis Hampson, 1916
- アカオビトガリメイガ — Endotricha ruminalis (Walker, 1859)
- カバイロトガリメイガ — Endotricha theonalis (Walker, 1859)
- ツマグロフトメイガ — Noctuides melanophia Staudinger, 1892
- ミドリネグロフトメイガ — Stericta flavopuncta Inoue & Sasaki, 1995
- ネグロフトメイガ — Stericta kogii Inoue & Sasaki, 1995
- クロバネフトメイガ — Lepidogma angusta (Inoue, 1988)
- キイフトメイガ — Lepidogma kiiensis Marumo, 1920
- 和名未定 — Lepidogma latifasciata (Wileman, 1911)
- コネアオフトメイガ — Lepidogma melanobasis Hampson, 1906
- アカオビフトメイガ — Lepidogma tripartita (Wileman & South, 1917)
- オオフトメイガ — Salma amica (Butler, 1879)
- オオナカジロフトメイガ — Teliphasa albifusa (Hampson, 1896)
- ナカアオフトメイガ — Teliphasa elegans (Butler, 1881)
- サキシマフトメイガ — Teliphasa sakishimensis Inoue & Yamanaka, 1975
- フタスジフトメイガ — Termioptycha bilineata (Wileman, 1911)
- マエアカフトメイガ — Termioptycha eucarta (Felder & Rogenhofer, 1874)
- ソトベニフトメイガ — Termioptycha inimica (Butler, 1879)
- ナカジロフトメイガ — Termioptycha margarita (Butler, 1879)
- クロフトメイガ — Termioptycha nigrescens (Warren, 1891)
- ハスジフトメイガ — Epilepia dentata (Matsumura & Shibuya, 1927)
- ウスグロフトメイガ — Lamida obscura (Moore, 1888)
- トサカフトメイガ — Locastra muscosalis (Walker, 1866)
- ナカムラサキフトメイガ — Lista ficki (Christoph, 1881)
- ナカトビフトメイガ — Orthaga achatina achatina (Butler, 1878)
- クロモンフトメイガ — Orthaga euadrusalis Walker, 1859
- アオフトメイガ — Orthaga olivacea (Warren, 1891)
- ネアオフトメイガ — Orthaga onerata (Butler, 1879)
- ミドリフトメイガ — Trichotophysa jucundalis (Walker, 1866)
- キバネチビマダラメイガ — Quasipuer colon (Christoph, 1881)
- ツチトリモチマダラメイガ — Assara balanophorae Sasaki & Tanaka, 2004
- オオマエジロマダラメイガ — Assara formosana Yoshiyasu, 1991
- マエジロクロマダラメイガ — Assara funerella (Ragonot, 1901)
- チビマエジロホソマダラメイガ — Assara hoeneella Roesler, 1965
- イノウエマエジロマダラメイガ — Assara inouei Yamanaka, 1994
- フタシロテンホソマダラメイガ — Assara korbi (Caradja, 1910)
- ウスマエジロマダラメイガ — Assara pallidella Yamanaka, 1994
- シロスジマダラメイガ — Assara terebrella (Zincken, 1818)
- ウスオビクロマダラメイガ — Glyptoteles leucacrinella Zeller, 1848
- フタモンマダラメイガ — Euzophera batangensis Caradja, 1939
- 和名未定 — Euzophera diminutella Ragonot, 1901
- ウススジクロマダラメイガ — Euzophera fumatella Yamanaka, 1993
- マエジロオオマダラメイガ — Euzophera watanabei Roesler & Inoue, 1980
- ナカキチビマダラメイガ — Pseudocadra cuprotaeniella (Christoph, 1881)
- 和名未定 — Pseudocadra obscurella Roesler, 1965
- シロオビハイイロマダラメイガ — Euzopherodes nipponensis Yamanaka, 2006
- シロマダラメイガ — Euzopherodes oberleae Roesler, 1973
- ウスグロマルバスジマダラメイガ — Didia fuscostriatella Yamanaka, 2006
- マルバスジマダラメイガ — Didia striatella (Inoue, 1959)
- ウスイロサンカクマダラメイガ — Nyctegretis lineana (Scopoli, 1786)
- サンカクマダラメイガ — Nyctegretis triangulella (Hampson, 1901)
- マツムラマダラメイガ — Homoeosoma matsumurellum Shibuya, 1927
- トビスジマダラメイガ — Patagoniodes nipponellus (Ragonot, 1901)
- シロホソマダラメイガ — Phycitodes albatella ussuriella Roesler, 1965
- ヒトスジホソマダラメイガ — Phycitodes binaevella (Hübner, [1813])
- フトオビホソマダラメイガ — Phycitodes recurvaria Inoue, 1982
- ハイイロホソマダラメイガ — Phycitodes rotundisigna Inoue, 1982
- マエジロホソマダラメイガ — Phycitodes subcretacella (Ragonot, 1901)
- ハングロホソマダラメイガ — Phycitodes triangulella (Ragonot, 1901)
- ノシメマダラメイガ — Plodia interpunctella (Hübner, [1813])
- チャマダラメイガ — Ephestia elutella (Hübner, [1796])
- スジコナマダラメイガ — Ephestia kuehniella Zeller, 1879
- スジマダラメイガ — Cadra cautella (Walker, 1863)
- ホシブドウマダラメイガ — Cadra figulilella (Gregson, 1871)
- ハラウスキマダラメイガ — Sandrabatis crassiella Ragonot, 1893
- ヒメアカマダラメイガ — Sciota adelphella (Fischer von Röslerstamm, 1838)
- シロオビクロマダラメイガ — Sciota cynicella (Christoph, 1881)
- マエチャマダラメイガ — Sciota furvicostella (Ragonot, 1893)
- ナカアカスジマダラメイガ — Nephopterix bicolorella Leech, 1889
- ウスグロアカマダラメイガ — Nephopterix fumella (Eversmann, 1844)
- エチゴマダラメイガ — Nephopterix immatura Inoue, 1982
- ヤマトマダラメイガ — Nephopterix intercisella Wileman, 1911
- マエナミマダラメイガ — Nephopterix maenamii Inoue, 1959
- ミカドマダラメイガ — Nephopterix mikadella (Ragonot, 1893)
- ムラサキマダラメイガ — Nephopterix proximalis Walker, 1863
- トミサワマダラメイガ — Nephopterix tomisawai Yamanaka, 1986
- ウスチャマダラメイガ — Pempelia formosa (Haworth, 1811)
- ヒトテンクロマダラメイガ — Pempelia maculata (Staudinger, 1876)
- オオクロモンマダラメイガ — Pempelia vinacea (Inoue, 1959)
- ウスクロスジマダラメイガ — Calguia obscuriella (Inoue, 1959)
- ホソバムラサキマダラメイガ — Calguia rufobrunnealis Yamanaka, 2006
- シモフリマダラメイガ — Oncocera faecella (Zeller, 1839)
- アカマダラメイガ — Oncocera semirubella (Scopoli, 1763)
- 和名未定 — Citripestis sagittiferella (Moore, 1881)
- フサヒゲマダラメイガ — Epicrocis hilarella Ragonot, 1888
- ベニモンマダラメイガ — Epicrocis oegnusalis (Walker, 1859)
- ウスアカスジマダラメイガ — Apomyelois fasciatella Inoue, 1982
- フタスジクロマダラメイガ — Apomyelois subcognata (Ragonot, 1887)
- ゴママダラメイガ — Myelois circumvoluta (Fourcroy, 1785)
- 和名未定 — Myelois psendocribtum Kirpichnikova & Yamanaka, 1999
- 和名未定 — Myelois taenialis (Wileman, 1911)
- クシヒゲマダラメイガ — Mussidia pectinicornella (Hampson, 1896)
- カバイロマダラメイガ — Volobilis chloropterella (Hampson, 1896)
- イナゴマメマダラメイガ — Ectomyelois ceratoniae (Zeller, 1839)
- ナシマダラメイガ — Ectomyelois pyrivorella (Matsumura, 1899)
- ウスジロフタスジマダラメイガ — Faveria bilineatella (Inoue, 1959)
- テンクロトビマダラメイガ — Faveria bitinctella (Wileman, 1911)
- コシタジロクロマダラメイガ — Faveria leucophaeella (Zeller, 1867)
- コチンダマダラメイガ — Faveria subdasyptera Yamanaka, 2002
- シタジロクロマダラメイガ — Ptyobathra atrisquamella (Hampson, 1901)
- フタスジアカマダラメイガ — Boeswarthia oberleella Roesler, 1975
- ウスキマダラメイガ — Asclerobia gilvaria Yamanaka, 2006
- アカオビマダラメイガ — Acrobasis bifidella (Leech, 1889)
- ヒメアカオビマダラメイガ — Acrobasis birgitella (Roesler, 1975)
- ナシツヅリマダラメイガ — Acrobasis canella Yamanaka, 2003
- エノキアカオビマダラメイガ — Acrobasis celtifoliella Yamanaka, 2004
- エゾアカオビマダラメイガ — Acrobasis curvella (Ragonot, 1893)
- ヒメツツマダラメイガ — Acrobasis cymindella (Ragonot, 1893)
- ウスアカマダラメイガ — Acrobasis encaustella Ragonot, 1893
- ウスキオビマダラメイガ — Acrobasis flavifasciella Yamanaka, 1990
- オオアカオビマダラメイガ — Acrobasis frankella (Roesler, 1975)
- ウスグロアカオビマダラメイガ — Acrobasis fuscatella Yamanaka, 2004
- ギンマダラメイガ — Acrobasis heringii (Ragonot, 1888)
- シロオビマダラメイガ — Acrobasis injunctella (Christoph, 1881)
- ウスモンアカオビマダラメイガ — Acrobasis izuensis Yamanaka, 2004
- オオウスアカオビマダラメイガ — Acrobasis lutulentella Yamanaka, 2003
- リンゴハマキマダラメイガ — Acrobasis malifoliella Yamanaka, 2003
- オオトビネマダラメイガ — Acrobasis obrutella (Christoph, 1881)
- ニセウスキオビマダラメイガ — Acrobasis ochrifasciella Yamanaka, 2006
- ヒメトビネマダラメイガ — Acrobasis rufilimbalis (Wileman, 1911)
- ホソアカオビマダラメイガ — Acrobasis rufizonella (Ragonot, 1887)
- オオナシツヅリマダラメイガ — Acrobasis sasakii Yamanaka, 2003
- 和名未定 — Acrobasis scabrilineella Ragonot, 1893
- ツツマダラメイガ — Acrobasis squalidella (Christoph, 1881)
- ヒメエノキアカオビマダラメイガ — Acrobasis subceltifoliella Yamanaka, 2006
- ナシモンクロマダラメイガ — Conobathra bellulella (Ragonot, 1893)
- アカフマダラメイガ — Conobathra ferruginella (Wileman, 1911)
- 和名未定 — Conobathra rufofusella (Caradja, 1931)
- ウスアカオビマダラメイガ — Conobathra subflavella Inoue, 1982
- コクロモンマダラメイガ — Aurana vinaceella vinaceella (Inoue, 1963)
- フタグロマダラメイガ — Trachycera dichromella (Ragonot, 1893)
- トビネマダラメイガ — Trachycera hollandella (Ragonot, 1893)
- ヤマトフタグロマダラメイガ — Trachycera nipponella Yamanaka, 2000
- オオフタグロマダラメイガ — Trachycera paradichromella (Yamanaka, 1980)
- コフタグロマダラメイガ — Trachycera pseudodichromella (Yamanaka, 1980)
- ニセフタグロマダラメイガ — Trachycera vicinella Yamanaka, 2000
- ヤクシマフタグロマダラメイガ — Trachycera yakushimensis Yamanaka, 2000
- ギンスジマダラメイガ — Selagia argyrella ([Denis & Schiffermüller], 1775)
- フタクロテンマダラメイガ — Selagia spadicella (Hübner, [1796])
- トビマダラメイガ — Samaria ardentella Ragonot, 1893
- マツノマダラメイガ — Dioryctria abietella ([Denis & Schiffermüller], 1775)
- ビャクシンマダラメイガ — Dioryctria juniperella Yamanaka, 1990
- ドイツトウヒマダラメイガ — Dioryctria okui Mutuura, 1958
- マツアカマダラメイガ — Dioryctria pryeri Ragonot, 1893
- マツノシンマダラメイガ — Dioryctria sylvestrella (Ratzeburg, 1840)
- 和名未定 — Phycitopsis hemileucella Hampson, 1901
- マエジロギンマダラメイガ — Pseudacrobasis nankingella Roesler, 1975
- クスノチビマダラメイガ — Indomalayia flabellifera (Hampson, 1896)
- ヒゲブトマダラメイガ — Spatulipalpia albistrialis Hampson, 1912
- ウスモンマダラメイガ — Metriostola atratella Yamanaka, 1986
- イイジマクロマダラメイガ — Metriostola betulae (Goeze, 1778)
- シロスジクロマダラメイガ — Metriostola infausta (Ragonot, 1893)
- ウスグロマダラメイガ — Pyla fusca (Haworth, 1811)
- アカグロマダラメイガ — Pyla manifestella Inoue, 1982
- ハイイロマダラメイガ — Sacculocornutia monotonella (Caradja, 1927)
- クチキハイイロマダラメイガ — Salebriopsis albicilla (Herrich-Schäffer, 1849)
- ネッタイマダラメイガ — Cryptoblabes gnidiella (Millière, 1867)
- カラマツマダラメイガ — Cryptoblabes loxiella Ragonot, 1887
- マエウスジロマダラメイガ — Dipha aphidivora (Meyrick, 1934)
- マエジロマダラメイガ — Edulicodes inoueella Roesler, 1972
- ハイイロシロスジマダラメイガ — Psorosa decolorella Yamanaka, 1986
- モモノハマキマダラメイガ — Psorosa taishanella Roesler, 1975
- 和名未定 — Ceroprepes naga Roesler & Kuppers, 1979
- スジグロマダラメイガ — Ceroprepes nigrolineatella Shibuya, 1927
- ウスアカモンクロマダラメイガ — Ceroprepes ophthalmicella (Christoph, 1881)
- ウスアカネマダラメイガ — Ceroprepes patriciella Zeller, 1867
- ヒメイチモジマダラメイガ — Etiella behrii (Zeller, 1848)
- ミナミイチモジマダラメイガ — Etiella grisea grisea Hampson, 1903
- キオビマダラメイガ — Etiella walsinghamella Ragonot, 1888
- シロイチモンジマダラメイガ — Etiella zinckenella (Treitschke, 1832)
- ネアカマダラメイガ — Etielloides bipartitella (Leech, 1889)
- ナシハマキマダラメイガ — Etielloides curvella Shibuya, 1928
- コギマダラメイガ — Etielloides kogii Yamanaka, 1998
- ニセナシハマキマダラメイガ — Etielloides sejunctella (Christoph, 1881)
- マルモンマダラメイガ — Protoetiella bipunctella Inoue, 1959
- アカウスグロマダラメイガ — Neorufalda pullella Yamanaka, 1986
- シロチビマダラメイガ — Eucampyla estriatella Yamanaka, 1986
- サビイロマダラメイガ — Microthrix inconspicuella (Ragonot, 1888)
- アカモンマダラメイガ — Myelopsis rufimaculella Yamanaka, 1993
- ウスアカムラサキマダラメイガ — Addyme confusalis Yamanaka, 2006
- ウストビマダラメイガ — Pseudosyria dilutella (Hübner, [1796])
- クロオビマダラメイガ — Hoeneodes vittatellus (Ragonot, 1887)
- 和名未定 — Elasmopalpus bipaltiellus (Leech)
- シロフタスジマダラメイガ — Indomyrlaea eugraphella (Ragonot, 1888)
- ウストビネマダラメイガ — Thiallela hiranoi Yamanaka, 2002
- ウラギンマダラメイガ — Hypargyria metalliferella Ragonot, 1888
- ハマベホソメイガ — Anerastia lotella (Hübner, [1813])
- スジホソメイガ — Osakia lineolella Ragonot, 1901
- ヒトホシホソメイガ — Hypsotropa solipunctella Ragonot, 1901
- 和名未定 — Raphimetopus ablutellus (Zeller, 1839)
- ヒエホソメイガ — Enosima leucotaeniella (Ragonot, 1888)
- ウスベニホソメイガ — Critonia roseistrigella Hampson, 1896
- 和名未定 — Polyocha diversella Hampson, 1899
- オオマエジロホソメイガ — Emmalocera gensanalis South, 1901
- マエジロホソメイガ — Emmalocera venosella (Wileman, 1911)
- ニシザワマダラメイガ — Cathyalia nishizawai Yamanaka, 2004
- ナキジンマダラメイガ — Cathyalia okinawana Yamanaka, 2003
- ハリツルマサキマダラメイガ — Bahiria maytenella Yamanaka, 2004
- シベチャマダラメイガ — Copamyntis martimella Kirpichnikova & Yamanaka, 2002

== Crambidae ==
- タンザワヤマメイガ — Scoparia depressoides Inoue, 1994
- ホソバヤマメイガ — Scoparia isochroalis Hampson, 1907
- イワサキヤマメイガ — Scoparia iwasakii Sasaki, 1991
- マダラヤマメイガ — Scoparia latipennis Sasaki, 1991
- マツイヤマメイガ — Scoparia matsuii Inoue, 1994
- オオクロモンヤマメイガ — Scoparia molestalis Inoue, 1982
- オオヤマメイガ — Scoparia nipponalis Inoue, 1982
- ノリクラヤマメイガ — Scoparia spinata Inoue, 1982
- ウスモンヤマメイガ — Scoparia submolestalis Inoue, 1982
- トウホクヤマメイガ — Scoparia tohokuensis Inoue, 1982
- ウツギヤマメイガ — Scoparia utsugii Inoue, 1994
- ヤクシマクロヤマメイガ — Scoparia yakushimana Inoue, 1982
- ヤマナカヤマメイガ — Scoparia yamanakai Inoue, 1982
- アルプスヤマメイガ — Eudonia alpina (Curtis, 1850)
- スジブトヤマメイガ — Eudonia magnibursa Inoue, 1982
- スジボソヤマメイガ — Eudonia microdontalis (Hampson, 1907)
- タカネヤマメイガ — Eudonia nakajimai Sasaki, 2002
- ウスグロヤマメイガ — Eudonia persimilis Sasaki, 1991
- マルモンヤマメイガ — Eudonia puellaris Sasaki, 1991
- ヒラノヤマメイガ — Eudonia truncicolella (Stainton, 1849)
- カラフトヤマメイガ — Gesneria centuriella ([Denis & Schiffermüller], 1775)
- キンバネヤマメイガ — Micraglossa aureata Inoue, 1982
- シロエグリツトガ — Glaucocharis exsectella (Christoph, 1881)
- ハイイロエグリツトガ — Glaucocharis moriokensis (Okano, 1962)
- クロエグリツトガ — Glaucocharis mutuurella (Bleszynski, 1965)
- ヒメシロエグリツトガ — Glaucocharis parviexectella Sasaki, 2007
- オキナワエグリツトガ — Glaucocharis unipunctalis Sasaki, 2007
- ウスイロエグリツトガ — Glaucocharis utsugii Sasaki, 2007
- ミヤマエグリツトガ — Glaucocharis vermeeri (Bleszynski, 1965)
- イリオモテエグリツトガ — Mesolia bipunctella Wileman & South, 1918
- キオビカナサンツトガ — Metaeuchromius flavofascialis Park, 1990
- カナサンツトガ — Metaeuchromius kimurai Sasaki, 2005
- ソトモンツトガ — Miyakea expansa (Butler, 1881)
- モンチビツトガ — Microchilo inexpectellus Bleszynski, 1965
- チビツトガ — Microchilo inouei Okano, 1962
- ホソスジツトガ — Pseudargyria interruptella (Walker, 1866)
- オオバツトガ — Chilo christophi Bleszynski, 1965
- ナイトウツトガ — Chilo infuscatellus Snellen, 1890
- ヨシツトガ — Chilo luteellus (Motschulsky, 1866)
- ニカメイガモドキ — Chilo niponella (Thunberg, 1788)
- カバイロツトガ — Chilo phragmitellus (Hübner, [1805])
- ゴマフツトガ — Chilo pulveratus (Wileman & South, 1917)
- スジツトガ — Chilo sacchariphagus stramineellus (Caradja, 1926)
- ニカメイガ — Chilo suppressalis (Walker, 1863)
- チャバネツトガ — Japonichilo bleszynskii Okano, 1962
- ウスチャツトガ — Pseudocatharylla duplicella (Hampson, 1895)
- シロミャクツトガ — Pseudocatharylla inclaralis (Walker, 1863)
- マエジロツトガ — Pseudocatharylla infixella (Walker, 1863)
- マエキツトガ — Pseudocatharylla simplex (Zeller, 1877)
- ヒトテンツトガ — Calamotropha albistrigellus Hampson, 1898
- フタキスジツトガ — Calamotropha aureliella fulvilineata Okano, 1958
- ヒメキスジツトガ伊豆諸島以外亜種 — Calamotropha brevistrigella brevistrigella (Caradja, 1932)
- ヒメキスジツトガ伊豆諸島亜種 — Calamotropha brevistrigella maenamii Inoue, 1982
- ツチイロツトガ — Calamotropha doii Sasaki, 1997
- サキシマツトガ — Calamotropha formosella Bleszynski, 1961
- ヒメキテンシロツトガ — Calamotropha fulvifusalis (Hampson, 1900)
- キスジツトガ — Calamotropha nigripunctella (Leech, 1889)
- サツマツトガ — Calamotropha okanoi Bleszynski, 1961
- シロツトガ — Calamotropha paludella purella (Leech, 1889)
- イツトガ — Calamotropha shichito (Marumo, 1931)
- フタオレツトガ八重山亜種 — Calamotropha yamanakai owadai Inoue, 1982
- フタオレツトガ屋久島以北亜種 — Calamotropha yamanakai yamanakai Inoue, 1958
- クロマダラツトガ — Chrysoteuchia atrosignata (Zeller, 1877)
- ツマスジツトガ — Chrysoteuchia culmella ussuriella (Bleszynski, 1962)
- ダイセツツトガ — Chrysoteuchia daisetsuzana (Matsumura, 1927)
- ウスクロスジツトガ — Chrysoteuchia diplogramma (Zeller, 1863)
- テンスジツトガ — Chrysoteuchia distinctella (Leech, 1889)
- 和名未定 — Chrysoteuchia gregorella Bleszynski, 1965
- モリオカツトガ — Chrysoteuchia moriokensis (Okano, 1958)
- ナカモンツトガ — Chrysoteuchia porcelanella (Motschulsky, 1861)
- ウスキバネツトガ — Chrysoteuchia pseudodiplogramma (Okano, 1962)
- ハラキクロツトガ — Chrysoteuchia pyraustoides (Erschoff, 1877)
- 和名未定 — Crambus alexandrus Kirpichnikova, 1979
- シロスジツトガ — Crambus argyrophorus Butler, 1878
- オガサワラツトガ — Crambus boninellus Shibuya, 1929
- ミヤマウスギンツトガ — Crambus hachimantaiensis Okano, 1957
- エダツトガ — Crambus hamellus (Thunberg, 1788)
- ギンスジツトガ — Crambus humidellus Zeller, 1877
- フトシロスジツトガ — Crambus kuzakaiensis Okano, 1960
- オキナワツトガ — Crambus okinawanus Inoue, 1982
- ギントガリツトガ — Crambus pascuellus (Linnaeus, 1758)
- ウスギンツトガ — Crambus perlellus (Scopoli, 1763)
- ニセシロスジツトガ — Crambus pseudargyrophorus Okano, 1960
- ホソエダツトガ — Crambus sibiricus Alphéraky, 1897
- ヒメギンスジツトガ — Crambus silvellus (Hübner, [1813])
- ツシマツトガ — Crambus sinicolellus Caradja, 1926
- サロベツツトガ — Crambus uliginosellus Zeller, 1850
- ナカグロツトガ — Crambus virgatellus Wileman, 1911
- シロフタスジツトガ — Agriphila aeneociliella (Eversmann, 1844)
- コギツトガ — Agriphila sakayehamanus (Matsumura, 1925)
- ヒメフタテンツトガ — Catoptria amathusia Bleszynski, 1965
- エゾシロモンツトガ — Catoptria aurora Bleszynski, 1965
- タカネツトガ — Catoptria harutai Okano, 1958
- 和名未定 — Catoptria inouella Bleszynski, 1965
- フタテンツトガ — Catoptria montivaga (Inoue, 1955)
- オオヒシモンツトガ — Catoptria munroeella Bleszynski, 1965
- シロモンツトガ — Catoptria nana Okano, 1959
- ヒシモンツトガ — Catoptria permiaca (Petersen, 1834)
- ナカオビチビツトガ — Catoptria persephone Bleszynski, 1965
- キタヒシモンツトガ — Catoptria pinella (Linnaeus, 1758)
- ダイセツチビツトガ — Catoptria satakei (Okano, 1962)
- ニセフタテンツトガ — Catoptria submontivaga Bleszynski, 1965
- シラユキツトガ — Catoptria viridiana Bleszynski, 1965
- クロスジツトガ — Flavocrambus striatellus (Leech, 1889)
- フタスジミヤマツトガ — Japonicrambus bilineatus (Okano, 1957)
- オオフタスジミヤマツトガ — Japonicrambus ishizukai Okano, 1962
- ヤツガダケミヤマツトガ — Japonicrambus mitsundoi Sasaki & Jinbo, 2002
- ウスグロツトガ — Xanthocrambus lucellus (Herrich-Schäffer, [1848])
- クロフタオビツトガ — Neopediasia mixtalis (Walker, 1863)
- シバツトガ — Parapediasia teterella (Zincken, 1821)
- ナガハマツトガ — Platytes ornatella (Leech, 1889)
- ツトガ — Ancylolomia japonica Zeller, 1877
- リュウキュウツトガ — Ancylolomia westwoodi bitubirosella Amsel, 1959
- シロオビチビツトガ — Roxita albipennata Inoue, 1989
- キンイロエグリツトガ — Roxita fujianella Sung & Chen, 2002
- クドウツトガ — Pseudobissetia terrestrella kudoi Inoue, 1990
- シロチビツトガ — Gargela xanthocasis (Meyrick, 1897)
- ウスフタスジシロオオメイガ — Leechia bilinealis South, 1901
- フタスジシロオオメイガ — Leechia sinuosalis South, 1901
- キボシオオメイガ — Patissa fulvosparsa (Butler, 1881)
- ヒメキボシオオメイガ — Patissa minima Inoue, 1995
- シロオオメイガ — Scirpophaga excerptalis (Walker, 1863)
- ウスキシロオオメイガ — Scirpophaga gotoi Lewvanich, 1981
- イッテンオオメイガ — Scirpophaga incertulas (Walker, 1863)
- ヒトスジオオメイガ — Scirpophaga lineata (Butler, 1879)
- チビウスキオオメイガ — Scirpophaga micraurea Sasaki, 1994
- ツマキオオメイガ — Scirpophaga nivella (Fabricius, 1794)
- マエウスグロオオメイガ — Scirpophaga parvalis (Wileman, 1911)
- ムモンシロオオメイガ — Scirpophaga praelata (Scopoli, 1763)
- コガタシロオオメイガ — Scirpophaga virginia Schultze, 1908
- ニセムモンシロオオメイガ — Scirpophaga xanthopygata Schawerda, 1922
- クロフキオオメイガ — Schoenobius sasakii Inoue, 1982
- フタテンオオメイガ — Catagela subdodatella Inoue, 1982
- トガリオオメイガ — Donacaula mucronella ([Denis & Schiffermüller], 1775)
- ウスアカモンノメイガ — Hendecasis minutalis Hampson, 1906
- アカモンヒゲナガノメイガ — Hendecasis pulchella (Hampson, 1916)
- フタオビノメイガ — Trichophysetis cretacea (Butler, 1879)
- トビモンシロノメイガ — Trichophysetis rufoterminalis (Christoph, 1881)
- ウスキモンメイガ — Ptychopseustis pallidochrealis Yamanaka, 2004
- ウスキミズメイガ — Musotima colonalis (Bremer, 1864)
- エグリミズメイガ — Musotima dryopterisivora Yoshiyasu, 1985
- クマタミズメイガ — Musotima kumatai Inoue, 1996
- タンザワミズメイガ — Musotima tanzawensis Yoshiyasu, 1985
- カニクサシダメイガ — Neomusotima fuscolinealis Yoshiyasu, 1985
- 和名未定 — Melanochroa yasudai Yoshiyasu, 1985
- ネジロミズメイガ — Elophila fengwhanalis (Pryer, 1877)
- マダラミズメイガ — Elophila interruptalis (Pryer, 1877)
- 和名未定 — Elophila melagynalis (Agassiz, 1978)
- クロスジマダラミズメイガ — Elophila miurai Yoshiyasu, 1985
- ソトキマダラミズメイガ — Elophila nigralbalis (Caradja, 1925)
- ニセマダラミズメイガ — Elophila nigrolinealis (Pryer, 1877)
- 和名未定 — Elophila nymphaeata (Linnaeus, 1758)
- ウスマダラミズメイガ — Elophila orientalis (Filipjev, 1934)
- シナミズメイガ — Elophila sinicalis (Hampson, 1897)
- ヒメマダラミズメイガ — Elophila turbata (Butler, 1881)
- ギンモンミズメイガ — Nymphula corculina (Butler, 1879)
- ソトシロスジミズメイガ — Nymphula distinctalis (Ragonot, 1894)
- ミドロミズメイガ — Neoschoenobia testacealis Hampson, 1900
- ヤエヤマミズメイガ — Parapoynx bilinealis (Snellen, 1876)
- タカムクミズメイガ — Parapoynx crisonalis (Walker, 1859)
- クロテンシロミズメイガ — Parapoynx diminutalis Snellen, 1880
- イネミズメイガ — Parapoynx fluctuosalis (Zeller, 1852)
- ミサキコミズメイガ — Parapoynx moriutii Yoshiyasu, 2005
- ヒメコミズメイガ — Parapoynx rectilinealis Yoshiyasu, 1985
- シロミズメイガ — Parapoynx stagnalis (Zeller, 1852)
- ムナカタミズメイガ — Parapoynx ussuriensis (Rebel, 1910)
- イネコミズメイガ — Parapoynx vittalis (Bremer, 1864)
- スジグロミズメイガ — Paracymoriza fuscalis (Yoshiyasu, 1985)
- クロバミズメイガ — Paracymoriza nigra (Warren, 1896)
- オキナワミズメイガ — Paracymoriza okinawanus (Yoshiyasu & Arita, 1992)
- ゼニガサミズメイガ — Paracymoriza prodigalis (Leech, 1897)
- カワゴケミズメイガ — Paracymoriza vagalis (Walker, [1866])
- 和名未定 — Potamomusa aquilonia Yoshiyasu, 1985
- キオビミズメイガ — Potamomusa midas (Butler, 1881)
- タイワンヨツクロモンミズメイガ — Eoophyla conjunctalis (Wileman & South, 1917)
- ヨツクロモンミズメイガ — Eoophyla inouei Yoshiyasu, 1979
- モトシロアトモンミズメイガ — Nymphicula albibasalis Yoshiyasu, 1980
- コアトモンミズメイガ — Nymphicula mesorphna (Meyrick, 1894)
- アトモンミズメイガ — Nymphicula saigusai Yoshiyasu, 1980
- アマミアトモンミズメイガ — Nymphicula yoshiyasui Agassiz, 2002
- クロアトモンミズメイガ — Paracataclysta fuscalis (Hampson, 1893)
- エンスイミズメイガ — Eristena argentata Yoshiyasu, 1988
- シロスジクルマメイガ — Atralata albofascialis (Treitschke, 1829)
- ウスムラサキクルマメイガ — Clupeosoma cinereum (Warren, 1892)
- ナカアカクルマメイガ — Clupeosoma pryeri (Butler, 1881)
- ムラサキクルマメイガ — Clupeosoma purpureum Inoue, 1982
- ウスイロニセノメイガ — Evergestis aenealis ([Denis & Schiffermüller], 1775)
- ウスベニニセノメイガ — Evergestis extimalis (Scopoli, 1763)
- ナニセノメイガ — Evergestis forficalis (Linnaeus, 1758)
- ヘリジロカラスニセノメイガ — Evergestis holophaealis (Hampson, 1913)
- フタモンキニセノメイガ本州以南亜種 — Evergestis junctalis conjunctalis Inoue, 1955
- フタモンキニセノメイガ北海道亜種 — Evergestis junctalis junctalis (Warren, 1892)
- ケブカノメイガ — Crocidolomia pavonana (Fabricius, 1794)
- ハイマダラノメイガ — Hellula undalis (Fabricius, 1781)
- モンキシロノメイガ — Cirrhochrista brizoalis (Walker, 1859)
- コウセンポシロノメイガ — Cirrhochrista kosemponialis Strand, 1919
- ハイモンシロノメイガ — Pachybotys spissalis (Guenée, 1854)
- クロスカシトガリノメイガ — Cotachena alysoni Whalley, 1961
- チャイロスカシトガリノメイガ — Cotachena brunnealis Yamanaka, 2001
- スカシトガリノメイガ — Cotachena pubescens (Warren, 1892)
- タイワンスカシトガリノメイガ — Cotachena taiwanalis Yamanaka, 2001
- モンキノメイガ — Pelena sericea (Butler, 1879)
- オガサワラハラナガノメイガ — Tatobotys albivenalis Hampson, 1898
- キオビハラナガノメイガ — Tatobotys aurantialis Hampson, 1897
- キバネハラナガノメイガ — Tatobotys biannulalis (Walker, 1866)
- ウスグロハラナガノメイガ — Tatobotys janapalis (Walker, 1859)
- シロテンノメイガ — Diathrausta brevifascialis (Wileman, 1911)
- ヒメシロテンノメイガ — Diathrausta profundalis Lederer, 1863
- マエシロモンノメイガ — Diathraustodes amoenialis (Christoph, 1881)
- クビシロノメイガ — Piletocera aegimiusalis (Walker, 1859)
- コガタシロモンノメイガ — Piletocera sodalis (Leech, 1889)
- ハナダカノメイガ — Camptomastix hisbonalis (Walker, 1859)
- ヒメハナダカノメイガ — Camptomastix septentrionalis Inoue, 1982
- シロオビナカボカシノメイガ — Cangetta rectilinea Moore, 1886
- マエクロモンシロノメイガ — Neohendecasis apiciferalis (Walker, 1866)
- エグリノメイガ — Diplopseustis perieresalis (Walker, 1859)
- クロエグリノメイガ — Sufetula minuscula Inoue, 1996
- シロスジエグリノメイガ — Sufetula sunidesalis Walker, 1859
- ミツテンノメイガ — Mabra charonialis (Walker, 1859)
- ナカグロチビノメイガ — Mabra eryxalis (Walker, 1859)
- ヒメミツテンノメイガ — Mabra nigriscripta Swinhoe, 1895
- マエモンノメイガ — Aripana cribrata (Fabricius, 1794)
- ゴマダラノメイガ — Pycnarmon lactiferalis (Walker, 1859)
- ヒメゴマダラノメイガ — Pycnarmon meritalis (Walker, 1859)
- クロオビノメイガ — Pycnarmon pantherata (Butler, 1878)
- クロクモキノメイガ — Tylostega tylostegalis (Hampson, 1900)
- シロオビノメイガ — Spoladea recurvalis (Fabricius, 1775)
- フタシロオビノメイガ — Hymenia persectalis (Hübner, [1796])
- アヤナミノメイガ — Eurrhyparodes accessalis (Walker, 1859)
- オオアヤナミノメイガ — Eurrhyparodes tricoloralis (Zeller, 1852)
- クロモンハイイロノメイガ — Charitoprepes lubricosa Warren, 1896
- オオムラサキノメイガ — Agrotera basinotata Hampson, 1891
- モトキムラサキノメイガ — Agrotera flavobasalis Hampson, 1996
- ウスムラサキノメイガ — Agrotera nemoralis (Scopoli, 1763)
- クロウスムラサキノメイガ — Agrotera posticalis Wileman, 1911
- フタマタノメイガ — Pagyda arbiter (Butler, 1879)
- キハダクロオビノメイガ — Pagyda citrinella Inoue, 1996
- ヨスジノメイガ — Pagyda quadrilineata Butler, 1881
- マタスジノメイガ — Pagyda quinquelineata Hering, 1903
- キンスジノメイガ — Daulia afralis Walker, 1859
- ムツテンノメイガ — Talanga nympha (Butler, 1880)
- ヨツボシノメイガ — Talanga quadrimaculalis (Bremer & Grey, 1853)
- ナカオビノメイガ — Hydriris ornatalis (Duponchel, 1832)
- Cnaphalocrocis daisensis (Shibuya, 1929)
- イネハカジノメイガ — Cnaphalocrocis exigua (Butler, 1879)
- コブノメイガ — Cnaphalocrocis medinalis (Guenée, 1854)
- ハネナガコブノメイガ — Cnaphalocrocis pilosa (Warren, 1896)
- チビコブノメイガ — Cnaphalocrocis poeyalis (Boisduval, 1833)
- ハカジモドキノメイガ — Cnaphalocrocis stereogona (Meyrick, 1886)
- コブナシノメイガ — Cnaphalocrocis suspicalis (Walker, 1859)
- マエキモンクロノメイガ — Syngamia falsidicalis (Walker, 1859)
- キンモンノメイガ — Aethaloessa calidalis tiphalis (Walker, 1859)
- オガサワラシロモンクロノメイガ — Bocchoris albipunctalis Shibuya, 1929
- シロモンノメイガ — Bocchoris inspersalis (Zeller, 1852)
- マエトビノメイガ — Ategumia adipalis (Lederer, 1863)
- ヤブカラシノメイガ — Sameodes abstrusalis (Moore, 1888)
- ナカキノメイガ — Sameodes aptalis usitatus (Butler, 1879)
- アミモントガリノメイガ — Sameodes cancellalis (Zeller, 1852)
- コシロモンノメイガ — Chabula acamasalis (Walker, 1859)
- オオシロモンノメイガ — Chabula telphusalis (Walker, 1859)
- アミメトガリノメイガ — Chabula trivitralis (Swinhoe, 1895)
- ソトグロキノメイガ — Analthes euryterminalis (Hampson, 1918)
- キボシノメイガ — Analthes insignis (Butler, 1881)
- ハラナガキマダラノメイガ — Analthes maculalis (Leech, 1889)
- シロヒトモンノメイガ — Analthes semitritalis orbicularis (Shibuya, 1928)
- ヒメクロスジノメイガ — Tyspanodes gracilis Inoue, 1982
- クロスジノメイガ — Tyspanodes striatus striatus (Butler, 1879)
- ハグルマノメイガ — Nevrina procopia (Stoll, 1781)
- コモンゴマダラノメイガ — Conogethes parvipunctalis Inoue & Yamanaka, 2006
- マツノゴマダラノメイガ — Conogethes pinicolalis Inoue & Yamanaka, 2006
- モモノゴマダラノメイガ — Conogethes punctiferalis (Guenée, 1854)
- カクモンノメイガ — Rehimena surusalis (Walker, 1854)
- キバネカクモンノメイガ — Rehimena variegata Inoue, 1996
- ハイイロノメイガ — Metasia bilineatella Inoue, 1996
- カクモンミスジノメイガ — Nacoleia charesalis (Walker, 1859)
- シロテンキノメイガ — Nacoleia commixta (Butler, 1879)
- 和名未定 — Nacoleia fumidalis (Leech, 1889)
- コガタノメイガ — Nacoleia gressitti Inoue, 1996
- イノウエノメイガ — Nacoleia inouei Yamanaka, 1980
- サツマキノメイガ — Nacoleia satsumalis South, 1901
- クロフキノメイガ — Nacoleia sibirialis (Millière, 1879)
- ネモンノメイガ — Nacoleia tampiusalis (Walker, 1859)
- シロモンコノメイガ — Glycythyma chrysorycta (Meyrick, 1884)
- クロミスジシロノメイガ — Metoeca foedalis (Guenée, 1854)
- ハイイロホソバノメイガ — Dolicharthria bruguieralis (Duponchel, 1833)
- オキナワミスジノメイガ — Omiodes decisalis (Walker, [1866])
- キオビノメイガ — Omiodes diemenalis (Guenée, 1854)
- マエウスキノメイガ — Omiodes indicatus (Fabricius, 1775)
- トガリシロアシクロノメイガ — Omiodes indistinctus (Warren, 1892)
- ヒメクロミスジノメイガ — Omiodes miserus (Butler, 1879)
- ヤマトシロアシクロノメイガ — Omiodes nipponalis Yamanaka, 2005
- キバラノメイガ — Omiodes noctescens (Moore, 1888)
- クロミスジノメイガ — Omiodes similis (Moore, [1885])
- シロアシクロノメイガ — Omiodes tristrialis (Bremer, 1864)
- ナカキトガリノメイガ — Preneopogon catenalis (Wileman, 1911)
- クロヘリキノメイガ — Goniorhynchus butyrosus (Butler, 1879)
- トビヘリキノメイガ — Goniorhynchus clausalis (Christoph, 1881)
- クロズノメイガ — Goniorhynchus exemplaris Hampson, 1898
- シャクトリノメイガ — Ceratarcha umbrosa Swinhoe, 1894
- ウスカバイロノメイガ — Endocrossis caldusalis (Walker, 1859)
- アカヘリオオキノメイガ — Botyodes asialis Guenée, 1854
- タイワンウスキノメイガ — Botyodes diniasalis (Walker, 1859)
- オオキノメイガ — Botyodes principalis Leech, 1889
- クロスジキンノメイガ — Pleuroptya balteata (Fabricius, 1798)
- ヒメウコンノメイガ — Pleuroptya brevipennis Inoue, 1982
- ハングロキノメイガ — Pleuroptya characteristica (Warren, 1896)
- ホソミスジノメイガ — Pleuroptya chlorophanta (Butler, 1878)
- シロハラノメイガ — Pleuroptya deficiens (Moore, 1887)
- ウスキモンノメイガ — Pleuroptya expictalis (Christoph, 1881)
- オオキバラノメイガ — Pleuroptya harutai (Inoue, 1955)
- コヨツメノメイガ — Pleuroptya inferior (Hampson, 1898)
- アマミキノメイガ — Pleuroptya iopasalis (Walker, 1859)
- ウスバキンノメイガ — Pleuroptya plagiatalis (Walker, 1859)
- ウスイロキンノメイガ — Pleuroptya punctimarginalis (Hampson, 1896)
- ヨツメノメイガ — Pleuroptya quadrimaculalis (Kollar, [1844])
- ウコンノメイガ — Pleuroptya ruralis (Scopoli, 1763)
- ミナミウコンノメイガ — Pleuroptya sabinusalis (Walker, 1859)
- ソトグロオオキノメイガ — Pleuroptya scinisalis (Walker, 1859)
- ウグイスノメイガ — Pleuroptya ultimalis (Walker, 1859)
- ワタヌキノメイガ — Haritalodes basipunctalis (Bremer, 1864)
- ワタノメイガ — Haritalodes derogata (Fabricius, 1775)
- 和名未定 — Syllepte cissalis Yamanaka, 1987
- オオツチイロノメイガ — Syllepte fuscoinvalidalis (Yamanaka, 1959)
- クロヘリノメイガ — Syllepte fuscomarginalis (Leech, 1889)
- ツチイロノメイガ — Syllepte invalidalis South, 1901
- ホソオビツチイロノメイガ — Syllepte pallidinotalis (Hampson, 1912)
- モンシロクロノメイガ — Syllepte segnalis (Leech, 1889)
- タイワンモンキノメイガ — Syllepte taiwanalis Shibuya, 1928
- コハングロキノメイガ — Syllepte verecunda (Warren, 1896)
- ウスグロヨツモンノメイガ — Lygropia yerburii nipponica Inoue, 1986
- ベニモンノメイガ — Agathodes ostentalis (Geyer, 1837)
- ウスモンヒメシロノメイガ — Palpita homalia Inoue, 1996
- ヒメシロノメイガ — Palpita inusitata (Butler, 1879)
- オオモンヒメシロノメイガ — Palpita munroei Inoue, 1996
- マエアカスカシノメイガ — Palpita nigropunctalis (Bremer, 1864)
- ワタヘリクロノメイガ — Diaphania indica (Saunder, 1851)
- ミツシロモンノメイガ — Glyphodes actorionalis Walker, 1859
- フタホシノメイガ — Glyphodes bipunctalis Leech, 1889
- アコウノメイガ — Glyphodes bivitralis Guenée, 1854
- アトクロオビノメイガ — Glyphodes crithealis (Walker, 1859)
- チビスカシノメイガ — Glyphodes duplicalis Inoue, Munroe & Mutuura, 1981
- ヒメシロマダラノメイガ — Glyphodes fenestratus Inoue, 1996
- ツシマスカシノメイガ — Glyphodes formosanus (Shibuya, 1928)
- オオスカシノメイガ — Glyphodes multilinealis Kenrick, 1907
- 和名未定 — Glyphodes onychinalis (Guenée, 1854)
- ツゲノメイガ — Glyphodes perspectalis (Walker, 1859)
- スカシノメイガ — Glyphodes pryeri Butler, 1879
- マダラシロモンノメイガ — Glyphodes pulverulentalis Hampson, 1896
- クワノメイガ — Glyphodes pyloalis Walker, 1859
- シロスジオオスカシノメイガ — Glyphodes stolalis Guenée, 1854
- コブヒゲシロモンノメイガ — Agrioglypta eurytusalis (Walker, 1859)
- イカリモンノメイガ — Agrioglypta itysalis (Walker, 1859)
- クロマダラスカシノメイガ — Dysallacta negatalis (Walker, 1859)
- ミドリノメイガ — Parotis marginata (Hampson, 1893)
- オガサワラミドリノメイガ — Parotis ogasawarensis (Shibuya, 1929)
- アオバノメイガ — Parotis suralis (Lederer, 1863)
- シロフクロノメイガ — Pygospila tyres (Cramer, 1780)
- ツマグロシロノメイガ — Polythlipta liquidalis Leech, 1889
- シロモンヒゲナガノメイガ — Nausinoe perspectata (Fabricius, 1775)
- ヒメツマグロシロノメイガ — Leucinodes apicalis Hampson, 1896
- ナスノメイガ — Leucinodes orbonalis Guenée, 1854
- ケブカキイロノメイガ — Thliptoceras amamiale Munroe & Mutuura, 1968
- ミスジノメイガ — Protonoceras capitale (Fabricius, 1794)
- オオエグリノメイガ — Terastia subjectalis Lederer, 1863
- サツマイモノメイガ — Omphisa anastomosalis (Guenée, 1854)
- キササゲノメイガ — Sinomphisa plagialis (Wileman, 1911)
- ヤツボシノメイガ — Prophantis adusta Inoue, 1986
- キバネトガリノメイガ — Hyalobathra coenostolalis (Snellen, 1980)
- ヒメチャバネトガリノメイガ — Hyalobathra dialychna Meyrick, 1894
- チャバネトガリノメイガ — Hyalobathra illectalis (Walker, 1859)
- アカトガリノメイガ — Hyalobathra undulinea (Hampson, 1891)
- キモンホソバノメイガ — Sinibotys butleri (South, 1901)
- セスジノメイガ — Sinibotys evenoralis (Walker, 1859)
- ヒメセスジノメイガ — Sinibotys obliquilinealis Inoue, 1982
- キベリハネボソノメイガ — Circobotys aurealis (Leech, 1889)
- ミナミホソバノメイガ — Circobotys cryptica Munroe & Mutuura, 1969
- キホソノメイガ本州以南亜種 — Circobotys heterogenalis gensanalis (South, 1901)
- キホソノメイガ北海道亜種 — Circobotys heterogenalis onumalis Munroe & Mutuura, 1969
- カギバノメイガ — Circobotys nycterina Butler, 1879
- 和名未定 — Circobotys uniformis (Hampson, 1913)
- アンボイナノメイガ — Maruca amboinalis (Felder & Rogenhofer, 1875)
- マメノメイガ — Maruca vitrata (Fabricius, 1787)
- チャモンキイロノメイガ — Pachynoa sabelialis (Guenée, 1854)
- ワモンノメイガ — Nomophila noctuella ([Denis & Schiffermüller], 1775)
- アカウスグロノメイガ本土亜種 — Bradina angustalis pryeri Yamanaka, 1984
- アカウスグロノメイガ琉球亜種 — Bradina angustalis ryukyuensis Yamanaka, 1984
- シロテンウスグロノメイガ — Bradina atopalis erectalis Yamanaka, 1984
- オオウスグロノメイガ — Bradina erilitoides Strand, 1919
- モンウスグロノメイガ — Bradina geminalis Caradja, 1927
- ヒメアカウスグロノメイガ — Bradina trigonalis Yamanaka, 1984
- ハマゴウノメイガ — Herpetogramma albipennis Inoue, 2000
- クロホシノメイガ — Herpetogramma basale (Walker, [1866])
- ヘリグロノメイガ — Herpetogramma cynarale (Walker, 1859)
- ウスオビクロノメイガ — Herpetogramma fuscescens (Warren, 1892)
- クロオビクロノメイガ — Herpetogramma licarsisale (Walker, 1859)
- モンキクロノメイガ — Herpetogramma luctuosale zelleri (Bremer, 1864)
- キモンウスグロノメイガ — Herpetogramma magnum (Butler, 1879)
- クロフキマダラノメイガ — Herpetogramma moderatale (Christoph, 1881)
- キマダラクロノメイガ — Herpetogramma ochrimaculale (South, 1901)
- ケナシチビクロノメイガ — Herpetogramma ochrotinctale Inoue, 1982
- イノモトソウノメイガ — Herpetogramma okamotoi Yamanaka, 1976
- ケナシクロオビクロノメイガ — Herpetogramma phaeopterale (Guenée, 1854)
- コキモンウスグロノメイガ — Herpetogramma pseudomagnum Yamanaka, 1976
- マエキノメイガ — Herpetogramma rudis (Warren, 1892)
- ケナガチビクロノメイガ — Herpetogramma stultale (Walker, 1859)
- ヘリグロキイロノメイガ — Herpetogramma submarginale (Swinhoe, 1901)
- キオビマエキノメイガ — Herpetogramma tominagai Yamanaka, 2003
- ヤエヤマクロノメイガ — Herpetogramma yaeyamense Yamanaka, 2003
- ヒロバウスグロノメイガ — Paranacoleia lophophoralis (Hampson, 1912)
- シロスジクロモンノメイガ — Loxostege aeruginalis (Hübner, [1796])
- ウラクロモンノメイガ — Loxostege turbidalis inornatalis (Leech, 1889)
- 和名未定 — Sitochroa inornatalis (Leech, 1889)
- ウラグロシロノメイガ — Sitochroa palealis ([Denis & Schiffermüller], 1775)
- マエキシタグロノメイガ — Sitochroa umbrosalis (Warren, 1892)
- クロミャクノメイガ — Sitochroa verticalis (Linnaeus, 1758)
- ヘリキスジノメイガ — Margaritia sticticalis (Linnaeus, 1761)
- キアヤヒメノメイガ — Diasemia accalis (Walker, 1859)
- シロアヤヒメノメイガ — Diasemia reticularis (Linnaeus, 1761)
- チビアヤヒメノメイガ — Diasemiopsis ramburialis (Duponchel, 1833)
- ホソトガリノメイガ — Antigastra catalaunalis (Duponchel, 1833)
- アカヘリスカシノメイガ — Autocharis amethystina Swinhoe, 1894
- オオモンシロルリノメイガ — Uresiphita dissipatalis (Lederer, 1863)
- キノメイガ — Uresiphita flavalis ([Denis & Schiffermüller], 1775)
- イタクラキノメイガ — Uresiphita fusei Inoue, 1982
- ウラジロキノメイガ — Uresiphita gracilis (Butler, 1879)
- モンウスベニオオノメイガ — Uresiphita polygonalis ([Denis & Schiffermüller], 1775)
- ウスベニオオノメイガ — Uresiphita prunipennis (Butler, 1879)
- ハネナガルリノメイガ — Uresiphita quinquigera (Moore, 1888)
- シュモンノメイガ — Uresiphita suffusalis (Warren, 1892)
- モンシロルリノメイガ — Uresiphita tricolor (Butler, 1879)
- ソトウスキノメイガ — Lipararchis tranquillalis (Lederer, 1863)
- タテシマノメイガ — Sclerocona acutella (Eversmann, 1842)
- キムジノメイガ — Prodasycnemis inornata (Butler, 1879)
- ミカエリソウノメイガ — Pronomis delicatalis (South, 1901)
- ホシオビホソノメイガ — Nomis albopedalis Motschulsky, 1861
- キタホシオビホソノメイガ — Paranomis sidemialis Munroe & Mutuura, 1968
- イラクサノメイガ — Eurrhypara hortulata (Linnaeus, 1758)
- ヨツメクロノメイガ — Algedonia luctualis diversa (Butler, 1881)
- タイリクキノメイガ — Phlyctaenia coronata (Hufnagel, 1767)
- クロマダラキノメイガ — Phlyctaenia coronatoides (Inoue, 1960)
- クシガタノメイガ — Phlyctaenia perlucidalis (Hübner, [1809])
- キイロノメイガ本州以南亜種 — Perinephela lancealis honshuensis Munroe & Mutuura, 1968
- キイロノメイガ北海道亜種 — Perinephela lancealis pryeri Munroe & Mutuura, 1968
- 和名未定 — Perinephela obtusalis Yamanaka, 1987
- スジマガリノメイガ — Mutuuraia terrealis (Treitschke, 1829)
- ナカミツテンノメイガ北海道亜種 — Proteurrhypara ocellalis apoialis Munroe & Mutuura, 1969
- ナカミツテンノメイガ本州以南亜種 — Proteurrhypara ocellalis ocellalis (Warren, 1892)
- ヘリジロキンノメイガ — Paliga auratalis (Warren, 1895)
- マエベニノメイガ — Paliga minnehaha (Pryer, 1877)
- マエウスモンキノメイガ — Paliga ochrealis (Wileman, 1911)
- モンスカシキノメイガ — Pseudebulea fentoni Butler, 1881
- ミヤマウスグロノメイガ — Opsibotys perfuscalis Munroe & Mutuura, 1969
- オオフチグロノメイガ — Paratalanta cultralis amurensis (Romanoff, 1887)
- キイロフチグロノメイガ — Paratalanta taiwanensis sasakii Inoue, 1982
- フチグロノメイガ — Paratalanta ussurialis (Bremer, 1864)
- 和名未定 — Prionopaltis consocia Warren, 1892
- アワノメイガ — Ostrinia furnacalis (Guenée, 1854)
- ウスジロキノメイガ — Ostrinia latipennis (Warren, 1892)
- オナモミノメイガ — Ostrinia orientalis orientalis Mutuura & Munroe, 1970
- マルバネキノメイガ — Ostrinia ovalipennis Ohno, 2003
- ユウグモノメイガ — Ostrinia palustralis memnialis (Walker, 1859)
- ウスグロキモンノメイガ — Ostrinia quadripunctalis ([Denis & Schiffermüller], 1775)
- アカノメイガ — Ostrinia sanguinealis sanguinealis (Warren, 1892)
- アズキノメイガ北海道亜種 — Ostrinia scapulalis pacifica Mutuura & Munroe, 1970
- アズキノメイガ本州亜種 — Ostrinia scapulalis subpacifica Mutuura & Munroe, 1970
- フキノメイガ本州亜種 — Ostrinia zaguliaevi honshuensis Mutuura & Munroe, 1970
- フキノメイガ九州亜種 — Ostrinia zaguliaevi kyushuensis Mutuura & Munroe, 1970
- フキノメイガ沖縄亜種 — Ostrinia zaguliaevi ryukyuensis Mutuura & Munroe, 1970
- ゴボウノメイガ九州・対馬・朝鮮亜種 — Ostrinia zealis bipatrialis Mutuura & Munroe, 1970
- ゴボウノメイガ本州亜種 — Ostrinia zealis centralis Mutuura & Munroe, 1970
- フチムラサキノメイガ — Aurorobotys aurorina (Butler, 1878)
- クロシオノメイガ南硫黄島亜種 — Erpis pacificalis iwojimensis Inoue, 1996
- クロシオノメイガ小笠原亜種 — Erpis pacificalis pacificalis Hampson, 1898
- ウスグロマルモンノメイガ — Udea exigualis (Wileman, 1911)
- ハイイロルリノメイガ — Udea grisealis
- ニセハイイロルリノメイガ — Udea intermedia
- ウスマルモンノメイガ — Udea lugubralis (Leech, 1889)
- コマルモンノメイガ — Udea montensis Mutuura, 1954
- ウスグロルリノメイガ — Udea nebulatalis
- ルリノメイガ — Udea orbicentralis (Christoph, 1881)
- ヒメルリノメイガ — Udea proximalis
- ウスオビノメイガ — Udea pseudocrocealis (South, 1901)
- チビマルモンノメイガ — Udea stationalis Yamanaka, 1988
- チャモンノメイガ — Udea stigmatalis (Wileman, 1911)
- クロモンキノメイガ — Udea testacea (Butler, 1879)
- オオマルモンノメイガ — Udea tritalis (Christoph, 1881)
- タケノメイガ — Crypsiptya coclesalis (Walker, 1859)
- ウドノメイガ — Udonomeiga vicinalis (South, 1901)
- ニセキンバネスジノメイガ — Xanthopsamma aurantialis Munroe & Mutuura, 1968
- キンバネスジノメイガ — Xanthopsamma genialis (Leech, 1889)
- スジモンカバノメイガ — Nascia cilialis virgatalis (Christoph, 1881)
- トガリキノメイガ — Demobotys pervulgalis pervulgalis (Hampson, 1913)
- ハッカノメイガ — Pyrausta aurata (Scopoli, 1763)
- カクモントビノメイガ — Pyrausta chrysitis Butler, 1881
- フタベニオビノメイガ — Pyrausta contigualis South, 1901
- ウスオビクロチビノメイガ — Pyrausta fuliginata Yamanaka, 1978
- トモンノメイガ — Pyrausta limbata (Butler, 1879)
- キオビトビノメイガ — Pyrausta mutuurai Inoue, 1982
- コチャオビノメイガ — Pyrausta neocespitalis Inoue, 1982
- アトグロキノメイガ — Pyrausta noctualis Yamanaka, 1978
- ベニフキノメイガ — Pyrausta panopealis (Walker, 1859)
- マエキモンノメイガ — Pyrausta pullatalis (Christoph, 1881)
- アカミャクノメイガ — Pyrausta rubiginalis (Hübner, [1796])
- シロムジノメイガ — Pyrausta testalis (Fabricius, 1794)
- ウチベニキノメイガ — Pyrausta tithonialis Zeller, 1872
- ヒトモンノメイガ — Pyrausta unipunctata Butler, 1881
- ハイイロムジノメイガ — Glauconoe deductalis (Walker, 1859)
- ウンモンシロノメイガ — Togabotys fuscolineatalis Yamanaka, 1978
- キベリスカシノメイガ — Callibotys wilemani Munroe & Mutuura, 1969
- ウスオビキノメイガ — Microstega jessica (Butler, 1878)
- ウスチャオビキノメイガ — Yezobotys dissimilis (Yamanaka, 1958)
- ヘリアカキンノメイガ — Carminibotys carminalis iwawakisana Munroe & Mutuura, 1971
- ウスヒメトガリノメイガ — Anania albeoverbascalis Yamanaka, 1966
- クロヒメトガリノメイガ — Anania egentalis (Christoph, 1881)
- シロモンクロノメイガ北海道亜種 — Anania funebris assimilis (Butler, 1879)
- シロモンクロノメイガ本州以南亜種 — Anania funebris astrifera (Butler, 1879)
- ヒメトガリノメイガ — Anania verbascalis ([Denis & Schiffermüller], 1775)
- ウスジロノメイガ — Psammotis orientalis Munroe & Mutuura, 1968
- ヒメヨツモンノメイガ — Heliothela nigralbata Leech, 1889
- シロオビヒゲナガノメイガ — Aetholix flavibasalis (Guenée, 1854)
- ウスグロハネボソノメイガ — Tetridia caletoralis (Walker, 1859)
- サザナミノメイガ — Massepha ohbai Yoshiyasu, 1990
- クロスジキノメイガ — Acropentias aurea (Butler, 1878)
- ヤハズカズラノメイガ — Filodes fulvidorsalis (Geyer, 1832)
- ヒロバヨツテンノメイガ — Notarcha quaternalis (Zeller, 1852)
- ヘリジロチャバネノメイガ — Lamprophaia albifimbrialis (Walker, [1866])
- ウスグロハラナガノメイガ(仮) — Hymenoptychis sordida Zeller, 1852
- ヒサゴモンノメイガ — Prooedema inscisalis (Walker, 1866)

== Callidulidae ==
- イカリモンガ — Pterodecta felderi (Bremer, 1864)
- ベニイカリモンガ — Callidula attenuata (Moore, 1879)

== Epicopeiidae ==
- アゲハモドキ本土亜種 — Epicopeia hainesii hainesii Holland, 1889
- アゲハモドキ対馬亜種 — Epicopeia hainesii tsushimana Inoue, 1978
- オナガアゲハモドキ — Epicopeia mencia Moore, 1874
- フジキオビ — Schistomitra funeralis Butler, 1881
- キンモンガ — Psychostrophia melanargia Butler, 1877

== Drepanidae ==
- ナガトガリバ — Euparyphasma maximum (Leech, [1889])
- モントガリバ — Thyatira batis japonica Werny, 1966
- カワムラトガリバ — Horithyatira kawamurae (Matsumura, 1921)
- キマダラトガリバ — Macrothyatira flavida flavida (Butler, 1885)
- ウスベニトガリバ — Monothyatira pryeri (Butler, 1881)
- ヒメウスベニトガリバ — Habrosyne aurorina aurorina (Butler, 1881)
- ウスベニアヤトガリバ — Habrosyne dieckmanni roseola Matsumura, 1909
- オオアヤトガリバ — Habrosyne fraterna japonica Werny, 1966
- タイワンアヤトガリバ — Habrosyne indica flavescens Werny, 1966
- カラフトアヤトガリバ — Habrosyne intermedia (Bremer, 1864)
- アヤトガリバ — Habrosyne pyritoides derasoides (Butler, 1878)
- マエジロトガリバ — Tethea albicostata japonibia Werny, [1967]
- オオバトガリバ — Tethea ampliata ampliata (Butler, 1878)
- オオマエベニトガリバ — Tethea consimilis consimilis (Warren, 1912)
- ホソトガリバ — Tethea octogesima octogesima (Butler, 1878)
- チョウセントガリバ — Tethea ocularis tanakai Inoue, 1982
- アカントガリバ — Tethea or akanensis (Matsumura, 1933)
- マエベニトガリバ — Tethea trifolium (Alphéraky, 1895)
- アマミトガリバ — Horipsestis mushana (Matsumura, 1931)
- ヒトテントガリバ — Tetheella fluctuosa isshikii (Matsumura, 1921)
- フタテントガリバ — Ochropacha duplaris (Linnaeus, 1761)
- ナカジロトガリバ — Togaria suzukiana Matsumura, 1921
- ヒメナカジロトガリバ — Togaria tancrei (Graeser, 1888)
- ウスジロトガリバ — Parapsestis albida Suzuki, 1916
- ギンモントガリバ — Parapsestis argenteopicta (Oberthür, 1879)
- ニッコウトガリバ — Epipsestis nikkoensis (Matsumura, 1921)
- ムラサキトガリバ — Epipsestis ornata (Leech, [1889])
- ウスムラサキトガリバ — Epipsestis perornata perornata Inoue, 1972
- ネグロトガリバ — Mimopsestis basalis (Wileman, 1911)
- サカハチトガリバ — Kurama mirabilis (Butler, 1879)
- タケウチトガリバ — Betapsestis umbrosa (Wileman, 1911)
- ミスジトガリバ — Achlya flavicornis jezoensis (Matsumura, 1927)
- キボシミスジトガリバ道南亜種 — Achlya longipennis inokoi Inoue, 1982
- キボシミスジトガリバ本州亜種 — Achlya longipennis longipennis Inoue, 1972
- キボシミスジトガリバ道東亜種 — Achlya longipennis tateyamai Inoue, 1982
- クラマトガリバ — Sugitaniella kuramana Matsumura, 1933
- マユミトガリバ — Neoploca arctipennis (Butler, 1878)
- ホシボシトガリバ — Demopsestis punctigera (Butler, 1885)
- タマヌキトガリバ — Neodaruma tamanukii Matsumura, 1933
- ナミスジトガリバ — Mesopsestis undosa (Wileman, 1911)
- オオカギバ — Cyclidia substigmaria nigralbata Warren, 1914
- ギンスジカギバ — Mimozethes argentilinearia (Leech, 1897)
- マエキカギバ対馬亜種 — Agnidra scabiosa fixseni (Bryk, 1949)
- マエキカギバ本土亜種 — Agnidra scabiosa scabiosa (Butler, 1877)
- オガサワラカギバ — Microblepsis acuminata (Leech, 1890)
- マンレイカギバ — Microblepsis manleyi manleyi (Leech, 1898)
- ヒメハイイロカギバ — Pseudalbara parvula (Leech, 1890)
- サキシマカギバ — Nordstromia duplicata (Warren, 1922)
- エゾカギバ — Nordstromia grisearia (Staudinger, 1892)
- ヤマトカギバ — Nordstromia japonica (Moore, 1877)
- ウスオビカギバ — Sabra harpagula olivacea (Inoue, 1958)
- オビカギバ — Drepana curvatula acuta Butler, 1881
- ウコンカギバ — Tridrepana crocea (Leech, [1889])
- ヒメウコンカギバ — Tridrepana unispina Watson, 1957
- オオギンモンカギバ — Callidrepana hirayamai hirayamai Nagano, 1918
- クロモンカギバ — Callidrepana melanonota Inoue, 1982
- ウスイロカギバ — Callidrepana palleola (Motschulsky, 1866)
- ギンモンカギバ — Callidrepana patrana (Moore, 1866)
- ナミスジシロカギバ — Ditrigona conflexaria conflexaria (Walker, 1861)
- ヨスジシロカギバ — Ditrigona quinquelineata (Leech, 1898)
- フタテンシロカギバ — Ditrigona virgo (Butler, 1878)
- ホシベッコウカギバ — Deroca inconclusa phasma Butler, 1878
- マダラカギバ — Callicilix abraxata abraxata Butler, 1885
- ヒトツメカギバ — Auzata superba superba (Butler, 1878)
- モンウスギヌカギバ — Macrocilix maia (Leech, [1889])
- ウスギヌカギバ — Macrocilix mysticata watsoni Inoue, 1958
- ナカモンカギバ — Cilix filipjevi malivora Inoue, 1958
- スカシカギバ — Macrauzata maxima maxima Inoue, 1960
- オオフトカギバ — Oreta fuscopurpurea Inoue, 1956
- オキナワカギバ対馬以外亜種 — Oreta loochooana loochooana Swinhoe, 1902
- オキナワカギバ対馬亜種 — Oreta loochooana timutia Watson, 1967
- アシベニカギバ — Oreta pulchripes Butler, 1877
- クロスジカギバ — Oreta turpis Butler, 1877
- アカウラカギバ — Hypsomadius insignis Butler, 1877
