= Scoparia utsugii =

Scientific classification
- Kingdom: Animalia
- Phylum: Arthropoda
- Class: Insecta
- Order: Lepidoptera
- Family: Crambidae
- Genus: Scoparia
- Species: S. utsugii

Binomial name
- Scoparia utsugii Inoue, 1994

Species of moth

Scoparia utsugii is a moth in the family Crambidae. It was described by Hiroshi Inoue in 1994. It is found in Shaanxi province of China and in Japan.
