= Scoparia latipennis =

Scientific classification
- Kingdom: Animalia
- Phylum: Arthropoda
- Class: Insecta
- Order: Lepidoptera
- Family: Crambidae
- Genus: Scoparia
- Species: S. latipennis

Binomial name
- Scoparia latipennis Sasaki, 1991

Species of moth

Scoparia latipennis is a moth in the family Crambidae. It was described by Sasaki in 1991. It is found in Japan (Honshu).
