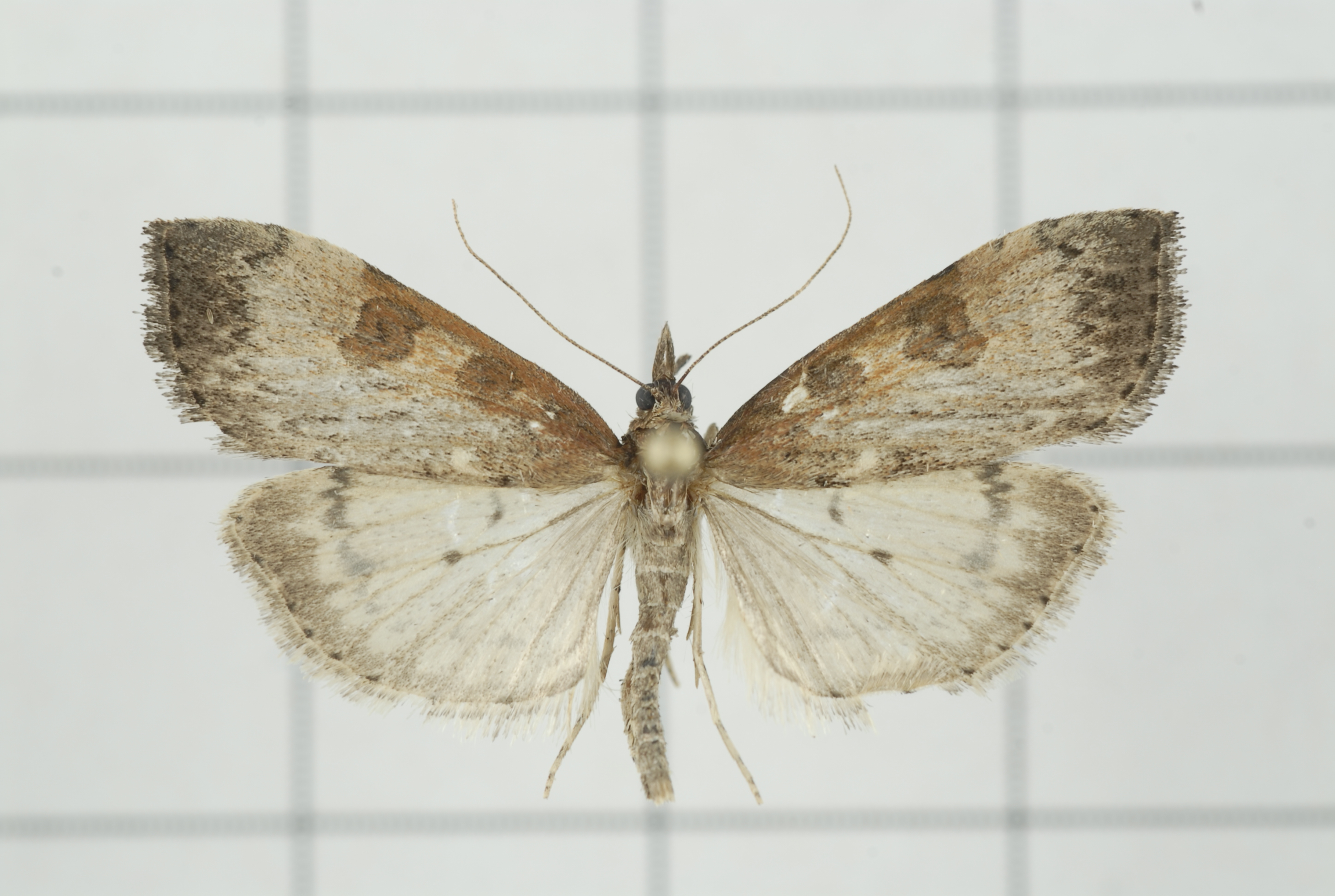

Scientific classification
- Domain: Eukaryota
- Kingdom: Animalia
- Phylum: Arthropoda
- Class: Insecta
- Order: Lepidoptera
- Family: Crambidae
- Genus: Udea
- Species: U. stigmatalis

Binomial name
- Udea stigmatalis (Wileman, 1911)

Synonyms
- Pionea stigmatalis Wileman, 1911

= Udea stigmatalis =

Species of moth

Udea stigmatalis is a moth in the family Crambidae. It was described by Wileman in 1911. It is found in Japan, Taiwan and Russia.

== Subspecies ==
- Udea stigmatalis stigmatalis
- Udea stigmatalis tayulingensis Heppner, 2005 (Taiwan)
