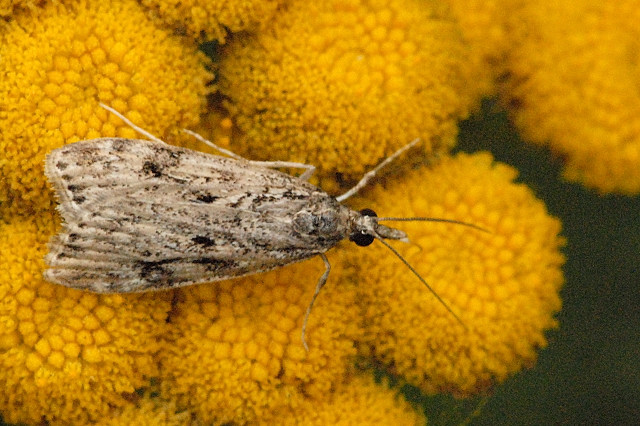

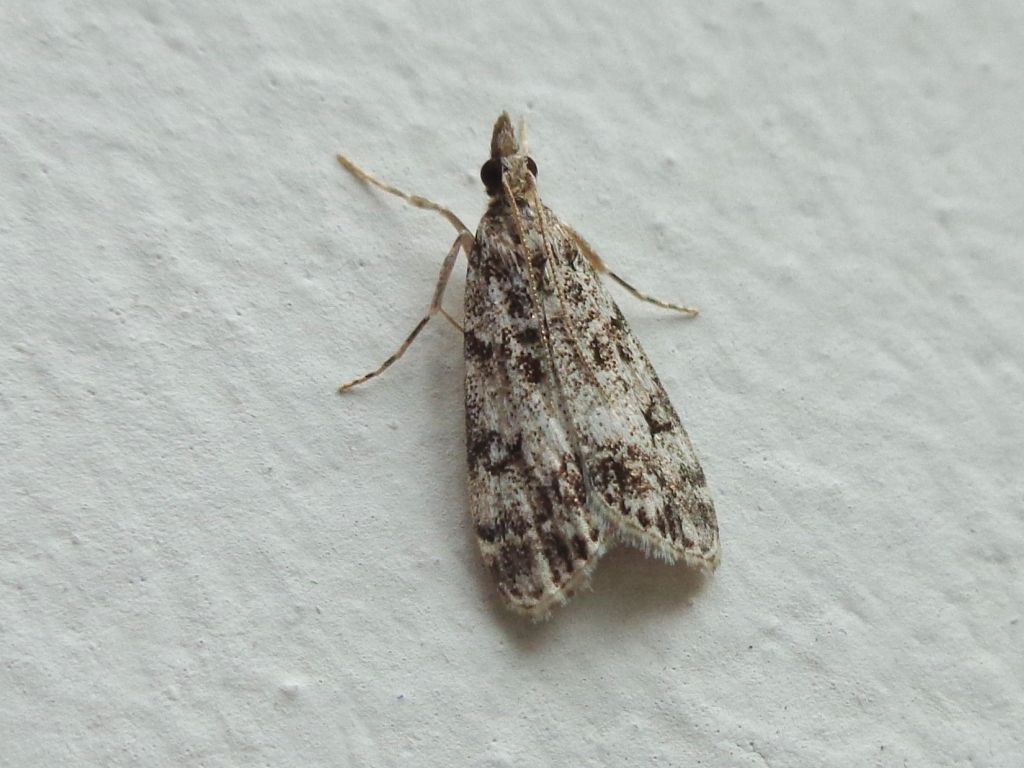

Scientific classification
- Kingdom: Animalia
- Phylum: Arthropoda
- Class: Insecta
- Order: Lepidoptera
- Family: Crambidae
- Genus: Eudonia
- Species: E. truncicolella

Binomial name
- Eudonia truncicolella (Stainton, 1849)

Synonyms
- List: Eudorea truncicolella Stainton, 1849; Eudonia hiranoi Inoue, 1982; Scoparia truncicolella f. fusca Dufrane, 1960; Scoparia truncicolella f. minor Dufrane, 1960; Scoparia truncicolella var. pallida E. R. Bankes, 1895

= Eudonia truncicolella =

Species of moth

Eudonia truncicolella is a species of moth of the family Crambidae described by Henry Tibbats Stainton in 1849. It is found in China (Hebei, Heilongjiang, Inner Mongolia, Jiangsu, Jilin, Liaoning), Japan west to Europe.

The wingspan is 18–23 mm (0.71–0.91 in). The forewings are ochreous-whitish, much sprinkled with black; base blackish - marked; lines whitish, dark -edged, first irregular, second angulate -sinuate, subserrate; orbicular and claviform dot-like or rather elongate, black; discal spot 8-shaped, outlined with black; subterminal line whitish, touching second in middle. Hindwings are whitish-grey, darker terminally. The larva is dull dark brown; dorsal line blackish; spots black head dark brown; plate of 2 almost black.

The moth flies from June to October depending on the location.

The larvae feed on various mosses.
