= Syllepte pallidinotalis =

Scientific classification
- Kingdom: Animalia
- Phylum: Arthropoda
- Class: Insecta
- Order: Lepidoptera
- Family: Crambidae
- Genus: Syllepte
- Species: S. pallidinotalis

Binomial name
- Syllepte pallidinotalis (Hampson, 1912)

Synonyms
- Nacoleia pallidinotalis Hampson, 1912

Species of moth

Syllepte pallidinotalis is a moth in the family Crambidae. It was described by George Hampson in 1912. It is found in western China and Japan.
