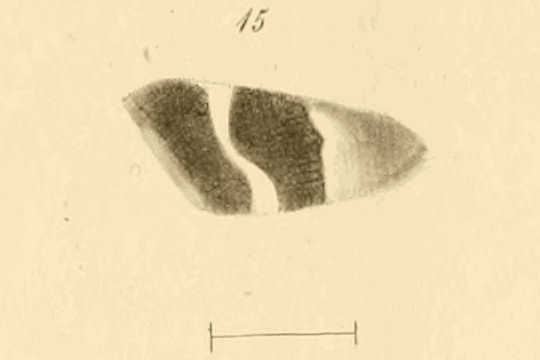

Scientific classification
- Kingdom: Animalia
- Phylum: Arthropoda
- Clade: Pancrustacea
- Class: Insecta
- Order: Lepidoptera
- Family: Crambidae
- Genus: Pyrausta
- Species: P. tithonialis

Binomial name
- Pyrausta tithonialis (Zeller, 1872)

Synonyms
- Botis tithonialis Zeller, 1872; Botys dotatalis Christoph, 1881; Botys kukunorensis Sauber, 1899

= Pyrausta tithonialis =

Species of moth

Pyrausta tithonialis is a moth in the family Crambidae. It was described by Zeller in 1872. It is found in Russia, China, Korea and Japan.

== Subspecies ==
- Pyrausta tithonialis tithonialis
- Pyrausta tithonialis bashkirica Slamka, 2013 (Russia: southern Urals)
- Pyrausta tithonialis caucasica Slamka, 2013 (Russia: Central Caucasus)
- Pyrausta tithonialis latiplagalis Caradja, 1934 (China: Guangdong)
