= Scoparia depressoides =

Scientific classification
- Kingdom: Animalia
- Phylum: Arthropoda
- Class: Insecta
- Order: Lepidoptera
- Family: Crambidae
- Genus: Scoparia
- Species: S. depressoides

Binomial name
- Scoparia depressoides Inoue, 1994

Species of moth

Scoparia depressoides is a moth in the family Crambidae. It was described by Hiroshi Inoue in 1994. It is found in Japan.
