= Scoparia spinata =

Scientific classification
- Kingdom: Animalia
- Phylum: Arthropoda
- Class: Insecta
- Order: Lepidoptera
- Family: Crambidae
- Genus: Scoparia
- Species: S. spinata

Binomial name
- Scoparia spinata Inoue, 1982

Synonyms
- Scoparia kiangensis P. Leraut, 1986

Species of moth

Scoparia spinata is a moth in the family Crambidae. It was described by Hiroshi Inoue in 1982. It is found in Japan, China (Hebei, Henan, Hunan, Sichuan, Yunnan, Zhejiang) and Thailand.
