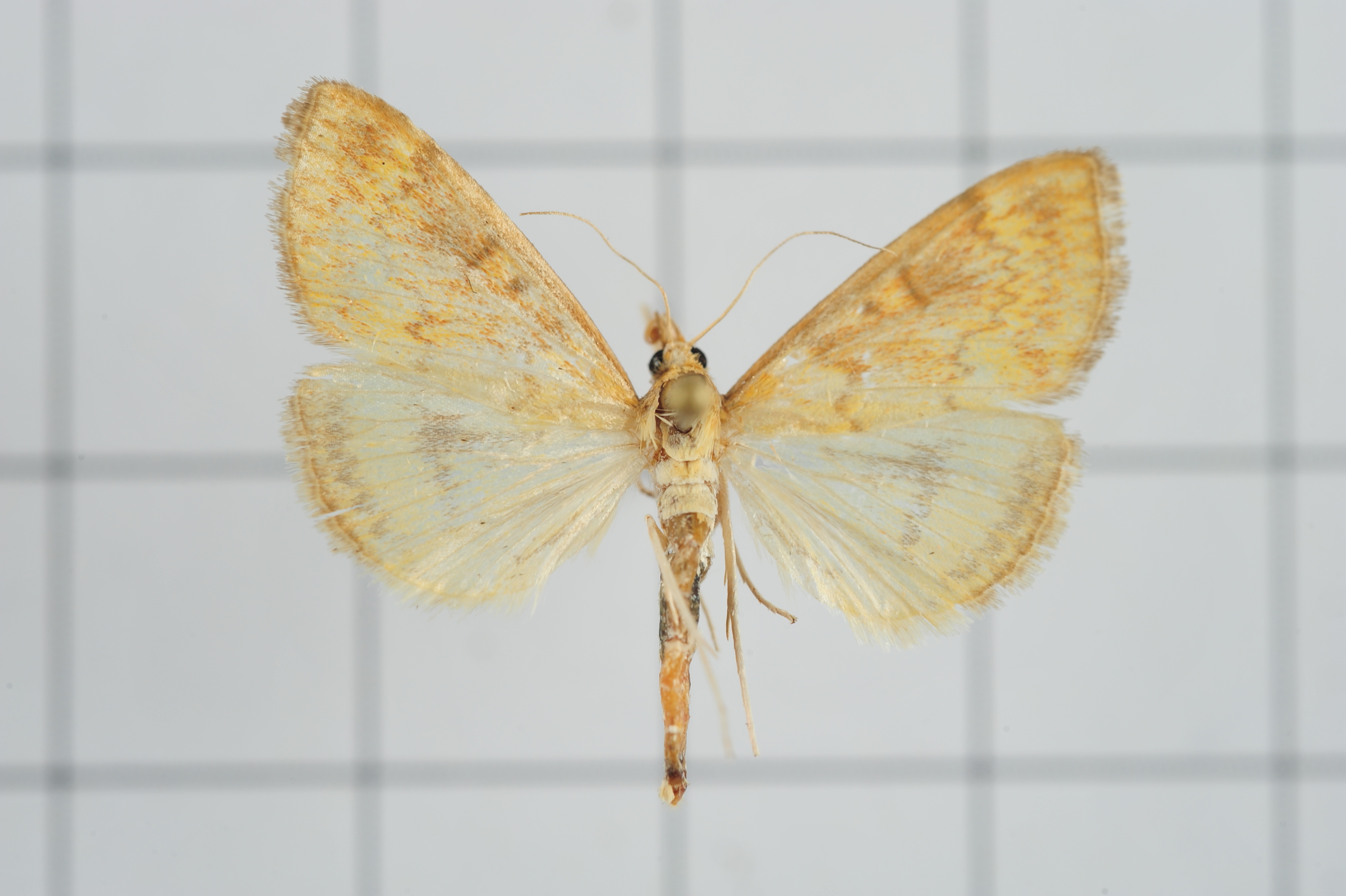

Scientific classification
- Kingdom: Animalia
- Phylum: Arthropoda
- Class: Insecta
- Order: Lepidoptera
- Family: Crambidae
- Genus: Ostrinia
- Species: O. zealis

Binomial name
- Ostrinia zealis (Guenée, 1854)

Synonyms
- Botys zealis Guenée, 1854; Ostrinia pseudoinornata Caradja, 1931; Pyrausta tamsi Caradja, 1927; Botys varialis Bremer, 1864

= Ostrinia zealis =

Species of moth

Ostrinia zealis is a moth in the family Crambidae. It was described by Achille Guenée in 1854. It is found in the Russian Far East, Japan, China and India.

== Subspecies ==
- Ostrinia zealis zealis (India)
- Ostrinia zealis bipatrialis Mutuura & Munroe, 1970 (Japan: Kyushu)
- Ostrinia zealis centralis Mutuura & Munroe, 1970 (Japan: Honshu)
- Ostrinia zealis holoxuthalis Hampson, 1913 (China: Hubei)
- Ostrinia zealis varialis (Bremer, 1864) (Russia: Ussuri)
