= Udea lugubralis =

Scientific classification
- Domain: Eukaryota
- Kingdom: Animalia
- Phylum: Arthropoda
- Class: Insecta
- Order: Lepidoptera
- Family: Crambidae
- Genus: Udea
- Species: U. lugubralis

Binomial name
- Udea lugubralis (Leech, 1889)

Synonyms
- Botys lugubralis Leech, 1889

Species of moth

Udea lugubralis is a moth in the family Crambidae. It was described by John Henry Leech in 1889. It is found in Japan and on the Kurile Islands, as well as in China.

The wingspan is about 27 mm. Adults are brown, with a slight cupreous tint. The forewings have a dark basal line and a darkly outlined stigmata, beyond them is a sharply serrated dark line, which curves abruptly towards the centre of the wing, then descends to the inner margin. The hindwings have a dark central line and discal spot.
