= Pyrausta fuliginata =

Scientific classification
- Domain: Eukaryota
- Kingdom: Animalia
- Phylum: Arthropoda
- Class: Insecta
- Order: Lepidoptera
- Family: Crambidae
- Genus: Pyrausta
- Species: P. fuliginata

Binomial name
- Pyrausta fuliginata Yamanaka, 1978

Species of moth

Pyrausta fuliginata is a moth in the family Crambidae. It was described by Hiroshi Yamanaka in 1978. It is found in Japan.
