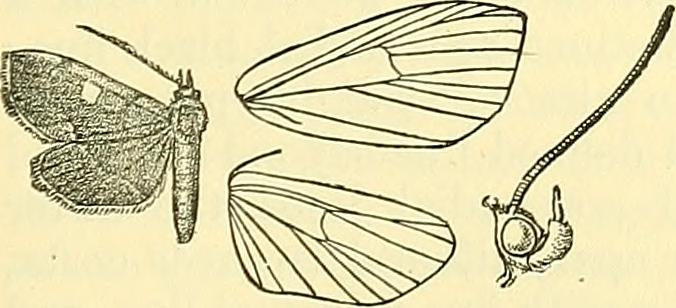

Scientific classification
- Domain: Eukaryota
- Kingdom: Animalia
- Phylum: Arthropoda
- Class: Insecta
- Order: Lepidoptera
- Family: Crambidae
- Genus: Luma
- Species: L. sericea

Binomial name
- Luma sericea (Butler, 1879)

Synonyms
- Deana sericea Butler, 1879

= Luma sericea =

Species of moth

Luma sericea is a moth in the family Crambidae. It was described by Arthur Gardiner Butler in 1879. It is found in Japan, Taiwan, China, India (Assam) and Burma.

The wingspan is about 11 mm.
