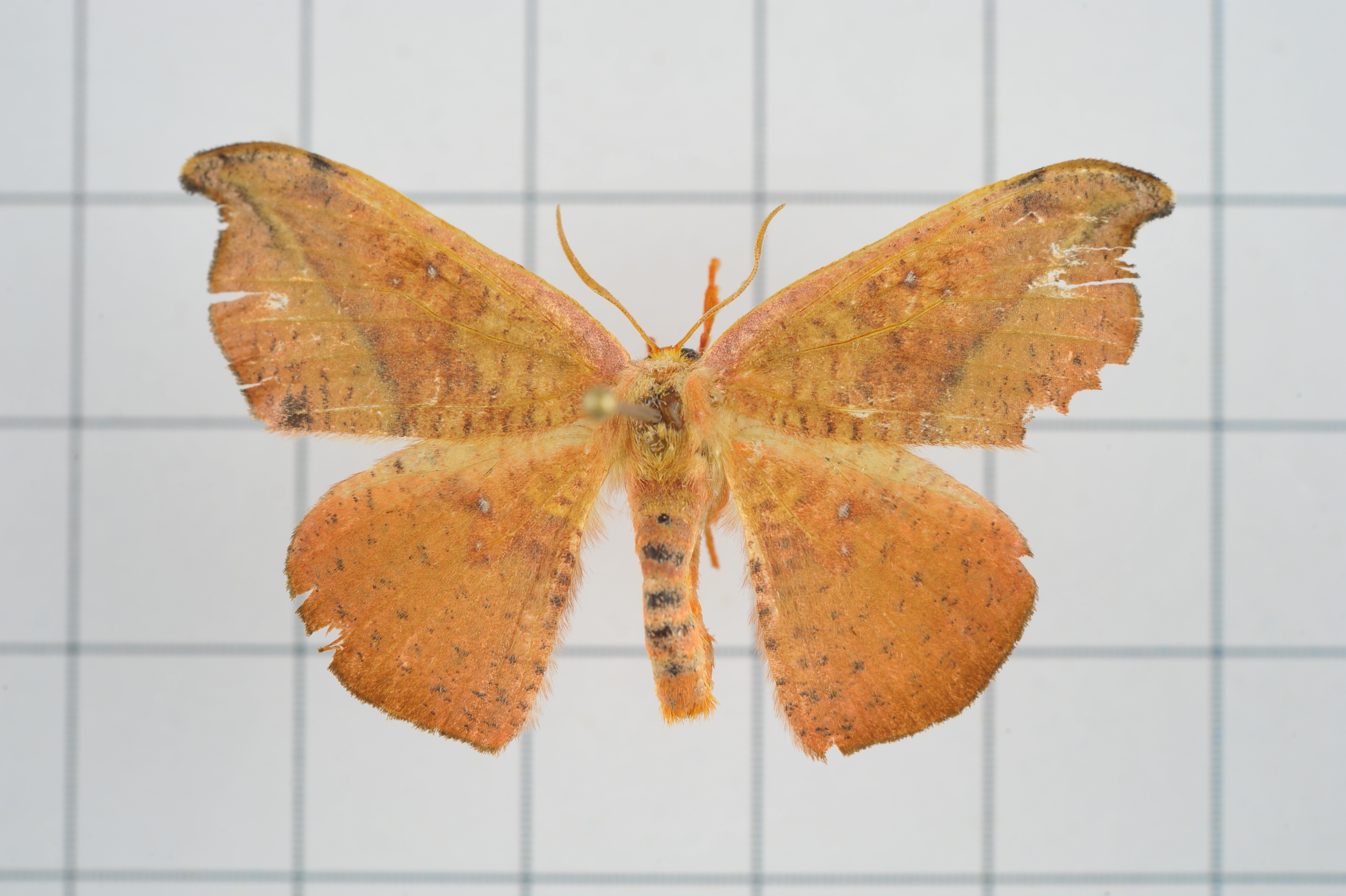

Scientific classification
- Kingdom: Animalia
- Phylum: Arthropoda
- Class: Insecta
- Order: Lepidoptera
- Family: Drepanidae
- Genus: Oreta
- Species: O. loochooana

Binomial name
- Oreta loochooana C. Swinhoe, 1902

Synonyms
- Oreta (Oretella) squamulata Strand, 1916; Psiloreta pulchripes formosicola Matsumura, 1927

= Oreta loochooana =

Species of hook-tip moth

Oreta loochooana is a moth in the family Drepanidae first described by Charles Swinhoe in 1902. It is found in Japan, Korea, mainland China, Taiwan and the Russian Far East.

The wingspan is 30–37 mm.

The larvae feed on the leaves of Viburnum odoratissimum and Viburnum luzonicus var. formosanum. Pupation takes place on the leaf surface.

== Subspecies ==
- Oreta loochooana loochooana (Taiwan, Korea, Russian Far East, Japan: Ryukyus, China: Shandong, Henan, Shaanxi, Gansu)
- Oreta loochooana timutia Watson, 1967 (China: Zhejiang, Hubei, Jiangxi, Hunan, Fujian, Guangdong, Guangxi, Sichuan, Chongqing, Yunnan)
