= Calamotropha yamanakai =

Scientific classification
- Kingdom: Animalia
- Phylum: Arthropoda
- Clade: Pancrustacea
- Class: Insecta
- Order: Lepidoptera
- Family: Crambidae
- Subfamily: Crambinae
- Tribe: Calamotrophini
- Genus: Calamotropha
- Species: C. yamanakai

Binomial name
- Calamotropha yamanakai Inoue, 1958

Species of moth

Calamotropha yamanakai is a moth in the family Crambidae. It was described by Hiroshi Inoue in 1958. It is found in Japan.

== Subspecies ==
- Calamotropha yamanakai yamanakai
- Calamotropha yamanakai owadai Inoue, 1982
