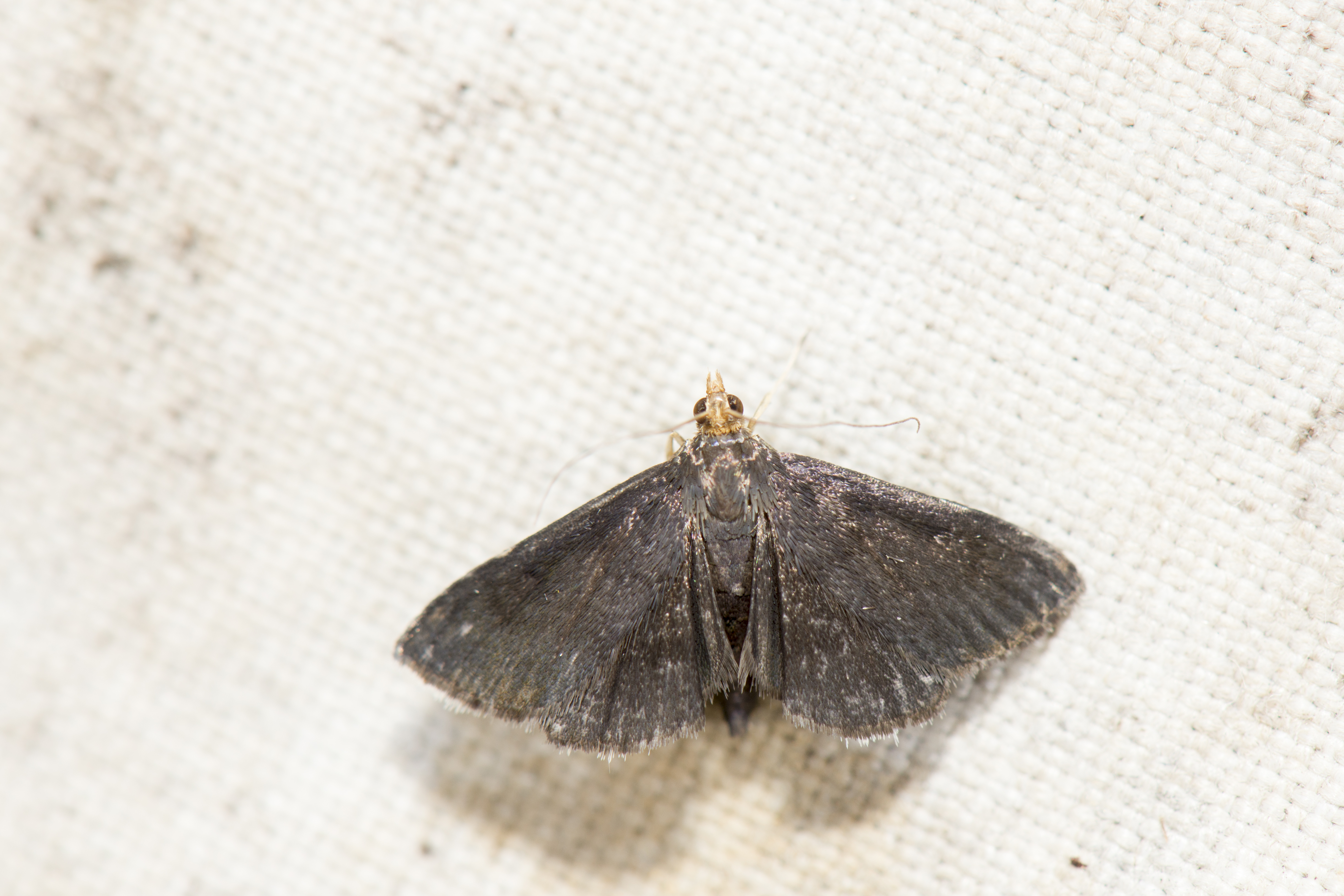

Scientific classification
- Domain: Eukaryota
- Kingdom: Animalia
- Phylum: Arthropoda
- Class: Insecta
- Order: Lepidoptera
- Family: Crambidae
- Genus: Pyrausta
- Species: P. limbata

Binomial name
- Pyrausta limbata (Butler, 1879)

Synonyms
- Ennychia limbata Butler, 1879

= Pyrausta limbata =

Species of moth

Pyrausta limbata is a moth in the family Crambidae. It was described by Arthur Gardiner Butler in 1879. It is found in Japan.
