= Calamotropha brevistrigellus =

Scientific classification
- Kingdom: Animalia
- Phylum: Arthropoda
- Clade: Pancrustacea
- Class: Insecta
- Order: Lepidoptera
- Family: Crambidae
- Subfamily: Crambinae
- Tribe: Calamotrophini
- Genus: Calamotropha
- Species: C. brevistrigellus

Binomial name
- Calamotropha brevistrigellus (Caradja, 1932)

Synonyms
- Crambus brevistrigellus Caradja, 1932

Species of insect

Calamotropha brevistrigellus is a moth in the family Crambidae. It was described by Aristide Caradja in 1932. It is found in China (Guangdong, Lianping) and Japan.

== Subspecies ==
- Calamotropha brevistrigellus brevistrigellus
- Calamotropha brevistrigellus maenamii Inoue, 1982 (Japan)
