= Herpetogramma pacificalis =

Scientific classification
- Kingdom: Animalia
- Phylum: Arthropoda
- Class: Insecta
- Order: Lepidoptera
- Family: Crambidae
- Genus: Herpetogramma
- Species: H. pacificalis

Binomial name
- Herpetogramma pacificalis (Hampson, 1912)

Synonyms
- Erpis pacificalis Hampson, 1912; Erpis pacificalis iwojimensis Inoue, 1996; Herpetogramma pacifica Inoue, 1998

Species of moth

Herpetogramma pacificalis is a species of moth in the family Crambidae. It was described by George Hampson in 1912. It is found in Japan, where it has been recorded from the Bonin Islands and Ogasawara Islands.
