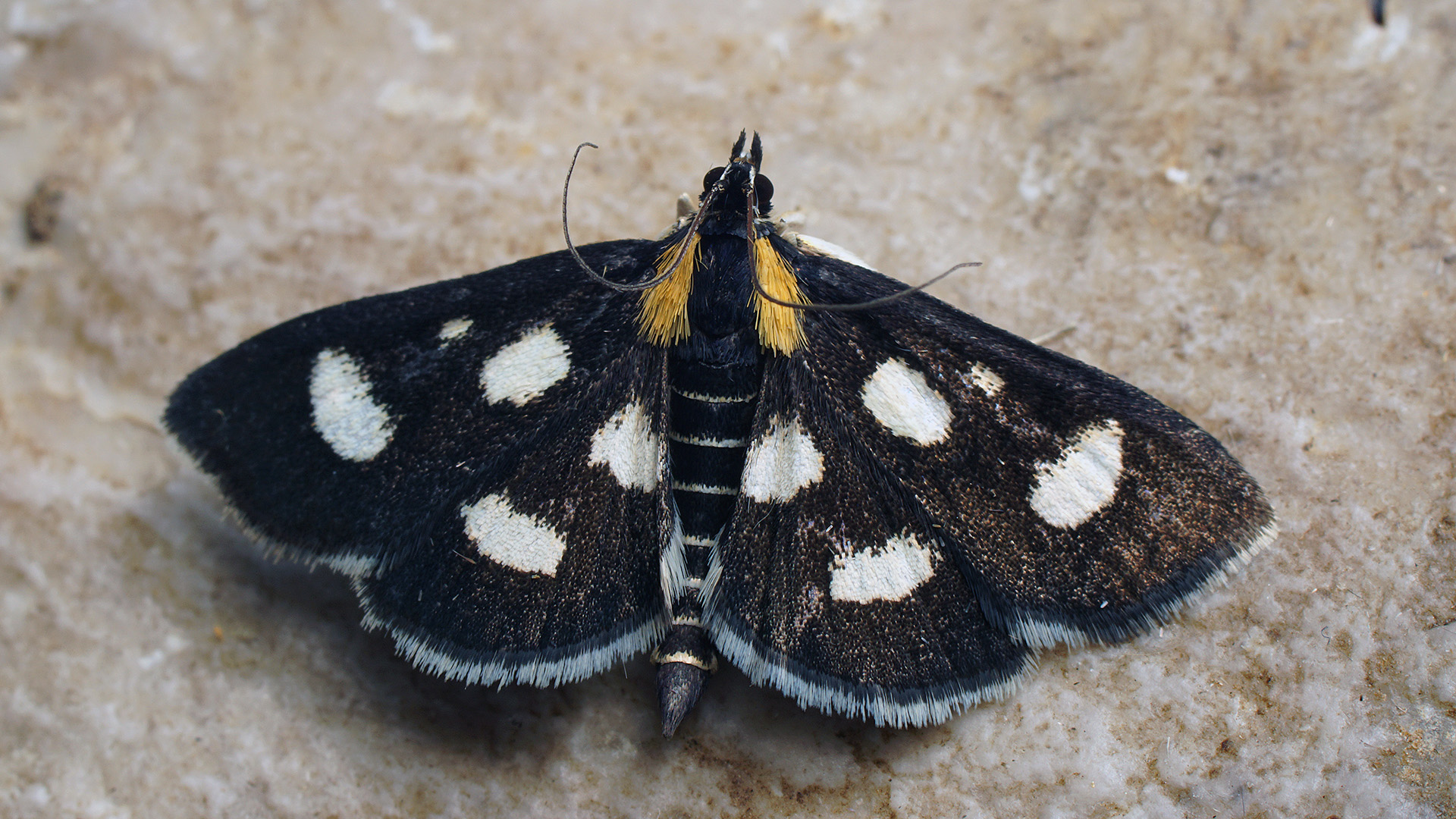
- In Russia

Scientific classification
- Kingdom: Animalia
- Phylum: Arthropoda
- Clade: Pancrustacea
- Class: Insecta
- Order: Lepidoptera
- Family: Crambidae
- Genus: Anania
- Species: A. funebris

Binomial name
- Anania funebris (Ström, 1768)

Synonyms
- List: Phalaena Geometra funebris Ström, 1768; Ennychia octomaculalis Treitschke, 1929; Geometra funeraria Müller, 1774; Anania funebris glomeralis (Walker, 1859); Phalaena (Geometra) octomaculata Linnaeus, 1771; Ennychia assimilis Butler, 1879; Ennychia astrifera Butler, 1879; Noctua trigutta Esper, 1791; Phalaena atralis Fabricius, 1775; Pionea funebris f. reducta Weber, 1945; Pyralis guttalis Denis & Schiffermüller, 1775; Anania funebris sabaudialis Leraut, 1996

= Anania funebris =

White spotted sable

Species of moth

Anania funebris, the white-spotted sable, is a species of diurnal dayflying moth of the family Crambidae. It is wide-spread in Europe, northern Asia, and North America.

== Subspecies ==
There are two subspecies:

- Anania funebris funebris (Ström, 1768) – Eurasia
- Anania funebris glomeralis (Walker, 1859) – North America

== Description ==
The wingspan is 20–23 mm (0.79-0.92 in). The forewings are black; a large round white subdorsal spot before middle, and a second in disc beyond middle; sometimes a white dot above first; cilia white towards tips. Hindwings as forewings, but without the white dot. The larva is ochreous-whitish; dorsal line deep green; subdorsal and lateral green; spiracular whitish-green; dots green; head whitish-brown.

See also Parsons et al.

In Switzerland

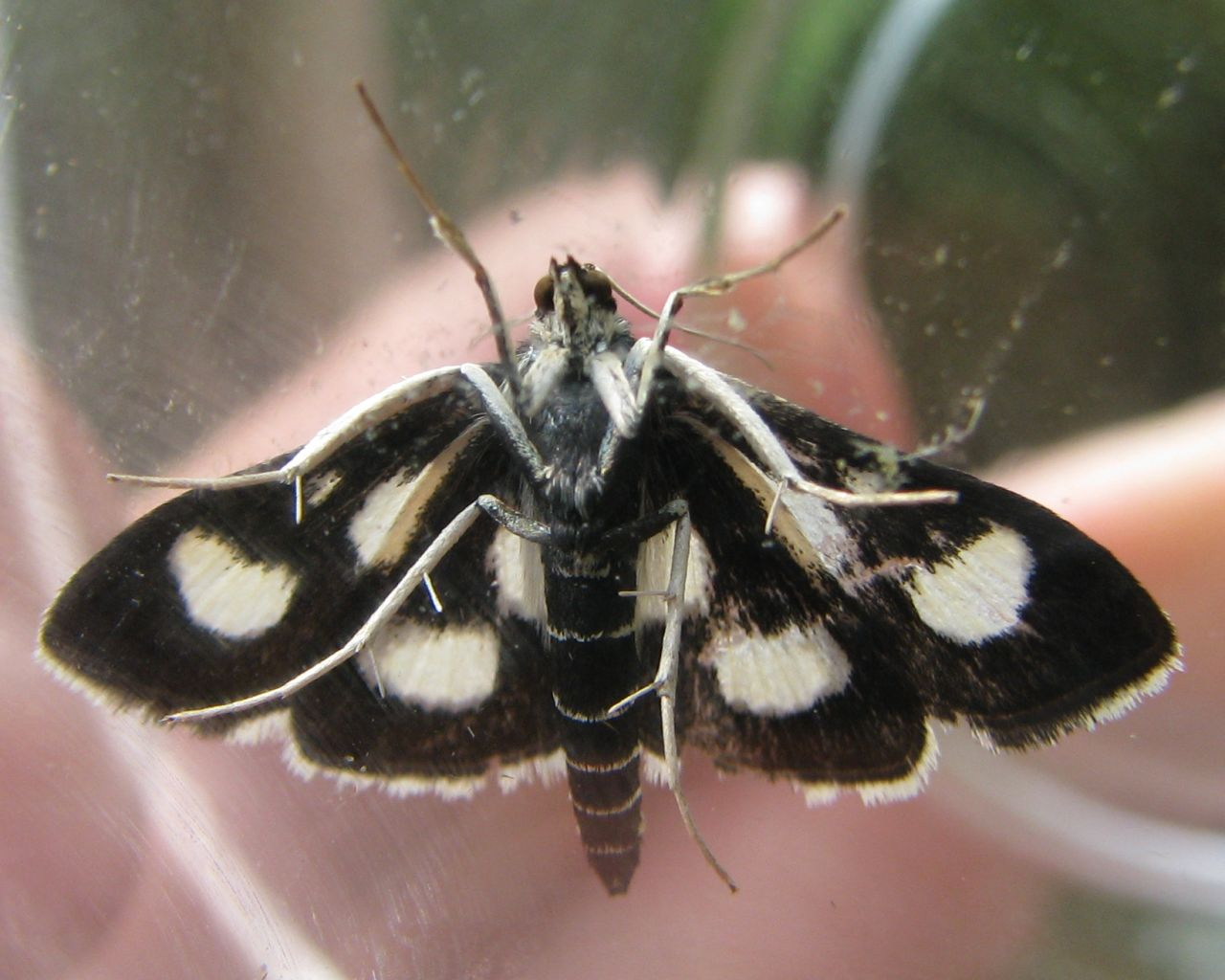
Ventral view

== Behavior ==
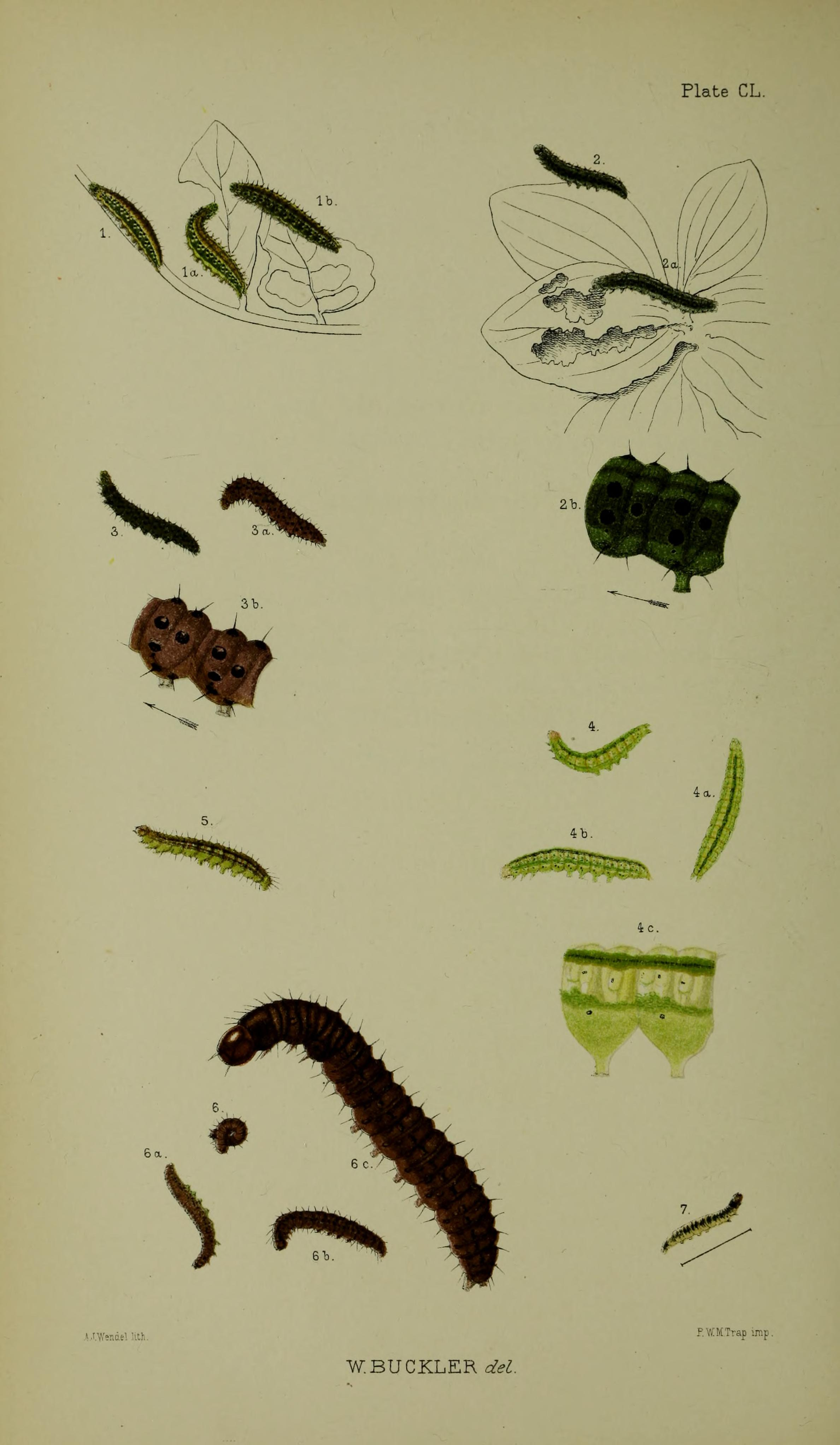
Larvae illustration

The adults have a tendency to quickly hide behind leaves.

The moth flies during the day from late April to August, June and July being the most active in their flight season.

== Diet ==
The larvae feed on leaves of goldenrod (Solidago) such as Solidago virgaurea. It occasionally feeds on dyer's greenweed (Genista tinctoria).
