= Circobotys heterogenalis =

Scientific classification
- Domain: Eukaryota
- Kingdom: Animalia
- Phylum: Arthropoda
- Class: Insecta
- Order: Lepidoptera
- Family: Crambidae
- Genus: Circobotys
- Species: C. heterogenalis

Binomial name
- Circobotys heterogenalis (Bremer, 1864)

Synonyms
- Omiodes heterogenalis Bremer, 1864

Species of moth

Circobotys heterogenalis is a moth in the family Crambidae. It was described by Otto Vasilievich Bremer in 1864. It is found in Japan and the Russian Far East.

== Subspecies ==
- Circobotys heterogenalis heterogenalis (Russia: Ussuri)
- Circobotys heterogenalis onumalis Munroe & Mutuura, 1969 (Japan: Hokkaido)
