= Bradina angustalis =

Scientific classification
- Domain: Eukaryota
- Kingdom: Animalia
- Phylum: Arthropoda
- Class: Insecta
- Order: Lepidoptera
- Family: Crambidae
- Genus: Bradina
- Species: B. angustalis

Binomial name
- Bradina angustalis Yamanaka, 1984

Species of moth

Bradina angustalis is a moth in the family Crambidae. It was described by Hiroshi Yamanaka in 1984. It is found in China and Japan.

== Subspecies ==
- Bradina angustalis angustalis (China)
- Bradina angustalis pryeri Yamanaka, 1984 (Japan)
- Bradina angustalis ryukyuensis Yamanaka, 1984 (Japan: Ryukyus)
