= Scoparia matsuii =

Scientific classification
- Kingdom: Animalia
- Phylum: Arthropoda
- Class: Insecta
- Order: Lepidoptera
- Family: Crambidae
- Genus: Scoparia
- Species: S. matsuii

Binomial name
- Scoparia matsuii Inoue, 1994

Species of moth

Scoparia matsuii is a moth in the family Crambidae. It was described by Hiroshi Inoue in 1994. It is found in Japan.
