= Syllepte segnalis =

Scientific classification
- Domain: Eukaryota
- Kingdom: Animalia
- Phylum: Arthropoda
- Class: Insecta
- Order: Lepidoptera
- Family: Crambidae
- Genus: Syllepte
- Species: S. segnalis

Binomial name
- Syllepte segnalis (Leech, 1889)

Synonyms
- Coptobasis segnalis Leech, 1889

Species of moth

Syllepte segnalis is a moth in the family Crambidae. It was described by John Henry Leech in 1889. It is endemic to Japan.

The wingspan is 19–23 millimetres (0.75–0.91 in). The forewings are brownish black, with a pale yellow discal spot and a wavy central band on the wing. The under surface are as above, but the markings are not so distinct.
