= Scoparia nipponalis =

Scientific classification
- Kingdom: Animalia
- Phylum: Arthropoda
- Class: Insecta
- Order: Lepidoptera
- Family: Crambidae
- Genus: Scoparia
- Species: S. nipponalis

Binomial name
- Scoparia nipponalis Inoue, 1982

Species of moth

Scoparia nipponalis is a moth in the family Crambidae. It was described by Hiroshi Inoue in 1982. It is found on the Japanese island of Hokkaido, the Chinese provinces of Henan and Shanxi and in Russia.
