= Dioryctria pryeri =

Scientific classification
- Domain: Eukaryota
- Kingdom: Animalia
- Phylum: Arthropoda
- Class: Insecta
- Order: Lepidoptera
- Family: Pyralidae
- Genus: Dioryctria
- Species: D. pryeri

Binomial name
- Dioryctria pryeri Ragonot, 1893

Synonyms
- Rhodophaea incertella Wileman, 1911; Salebria laruata Heinrich, 1928

Species of moth

Dioryctria pryeri, the splendid knot-horn moth, is a species of snout moth in the genus Dioryctria. It was described by Ragonot in 1893, and is known from Japan, Taiwan and China.

The wingspan is about 17 mm.

The larvae feed on the cones and branches of various Pinus species, including Pinus tabulaeformis, Pinus massoniana and Pinus koraiensis.
