= Scoparia tohokuensis =

Scientific classification
- Kingdom: Animalia
- Phylum: Arthropoda
- Class: Insecta
- Order: Lepidoptera
- Family: Crambidae
- Genus: Scoparia
- Species: S. tohokuensis

Binomial name
- Scoparia tohokuensis Inoue, 1982

Synonyms
- Scoparia magnipunctalis Sasaki, 1991

Species of moth

Scoparia tohokuensis is a moth in the family Crambidae. It was described by Hiroshi Inoue in 1982. It is found in China (Fujian, Guizhou, Hubei, Sichuan, Zhejiang), Japan and Russia.
