= Evergestis junctalis =

Scientific classification
- Domain: Eukaryota
- Kingdom: Animalia
- Phylum: Arthropoda
- Class: Insecta
- Order: Lepidoptera
- Family: Crambidae
- Genus: Evergestis
- Species: E. junctalis

Binomial name
- Evergestis junctalis (Warren, 1892)

Synonyms
- Mesographe junctalis Warren, 1892

Species of moth

Evergestis junctalis is a moth in the family Crambidae. It was described by Warren in 1892. It is found in Japan and on the Kuriles.

The wingspan is 10–19 mm.

== Subspecies ==
- Evergestis junctalis junctalis
- Evergestis junctalis conjunctalis Inoue, 1955
