= Bostra pulverealis =

Scientific classification
- Kingdom: Animalia
- Phylum: Arthropoda
- Clade: Pancrustacea
- Class: Insecta
- Order: Lepidoptera
- Family: Pyralidae
- Genus: Bostra
- Species: B. pulverealis

Binomial name
- Bostra pulverealis (Hampson, 1916)

Synonyms
- Endotricha pulverealis Hampson, 1916

Species of moth

Bostra pulverealis is a species of snout moth in the genus Bostra. It was described by George Hampson in 1916. It is found on the Bonin Islands of Japan.
