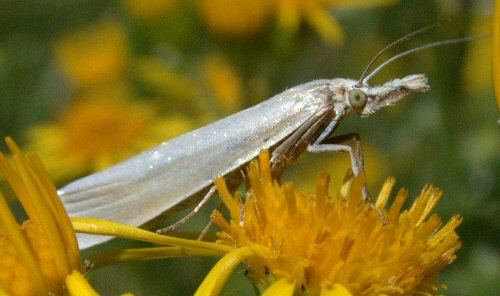

Scientific classification
- Kingdom: Animalia
- Phylum: Arthropoda
- Clade: Pancrustacea
- Class: Insecta
- Order: Lepidoptera
- Family: Crambidae
- Genus: Crambus
- Species: C. perlella

Binomial name
- Crambus perlella (Scopoli, 1763)

Synonyms
- Phalaena perlella Scopoli, 1763; Crambus perlella aurellus Zerny, 1914; Crambus perlellus ab. obscurelllus Osthelder, 1939; Crambus warringtonellus Stainton, 1849; Crambus perlella cupriacellus Zerny, 1914; Crambus perlella flavonitellus Zerny, 1935; Platytes perlellus f. auratus D. Lucas, 1956; Crambus perlella hachimantaiensis Okano, 1957; Crambus perlella innotatellus Walker, 1863; Crambus inornatellus Clemens, 1864; Crambus sericinellus Zeller, 1863; Crambus perlella kirinellus Bleszynski, 1965; Crambus perlella monochromella Herrich-Schäffer, 1852; Crambus rostellus La Harpe, 1855; Crambus perlella nigerrimus Caradja, 1916; Crambus perlella pamiri Bleszynski, 1959; Selagia perlalis Hübner, 1825; Crambus perlella pseudorostellus Müller-Rutz, 1923; Tinea arbustella Fabricius, 1794; Tinea arbustorum Stephens, 1834; Tinea argentella Fabricius, 1775; Palparia argentea Haworth, 1811; Tinea argenteus Fabricius, 1798; Tinea dealbella Thunberg, 1788

= Crambus perlella =

Species of moth

Crambus perlella is a species of moth of the family Crambidae. It is found in Europe and east across the Palearctic.

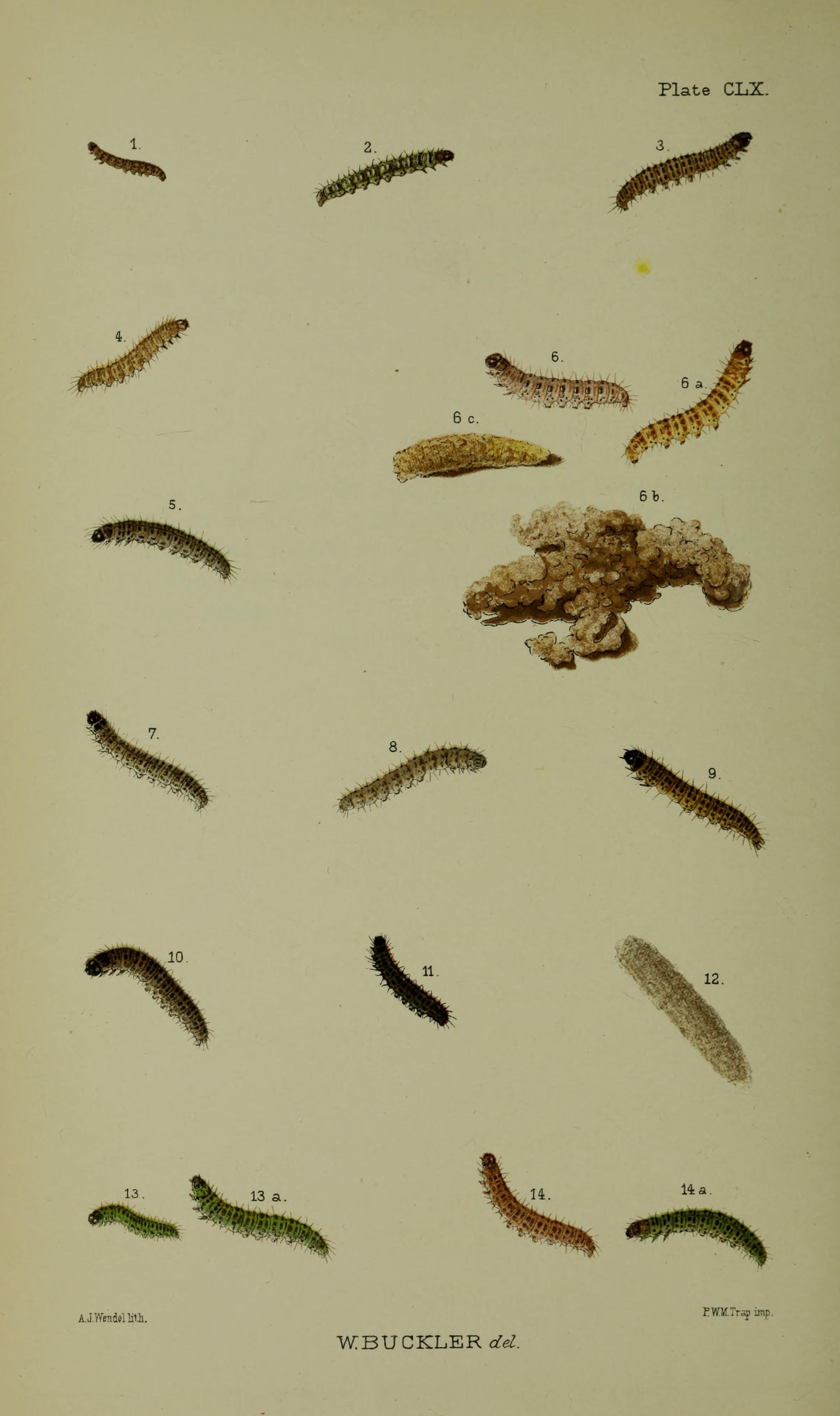
Fig.13, 13a larvae in various stages of growth, 14, 14a f. warringtonellus larva after final moult

The wingspan is 19–28 mm. The face is rather prominent. Forewings very shining whitish, often ochreous-tinged; veins and dorsal area often more or less broadly suffused with dark grey; cilia shining white. Hindwings are grey, sometimes much suffused with ochreous-whitish, sometimes posteriorly dark grey. The larva is light grey-greenish or greyish-ochreous; dorsal line darker; spots brown; head pale yellow-brown, darker-marked. See also Parsons et al.

The moth flies from July to August depending on the location.

The larvae feed on various grasses. Adults feed on the nectar of Leucanthemum species.
