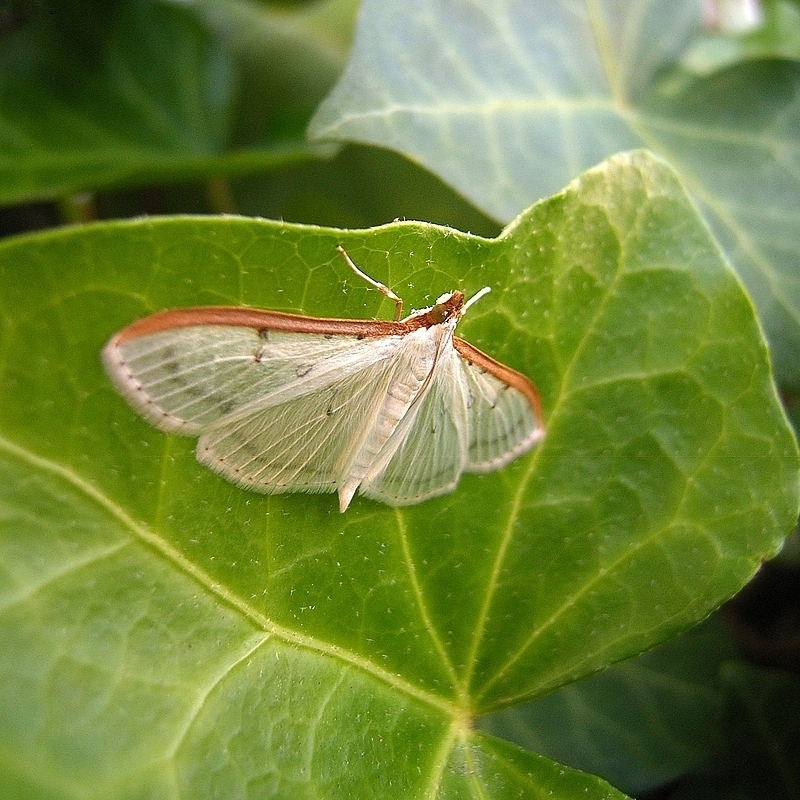

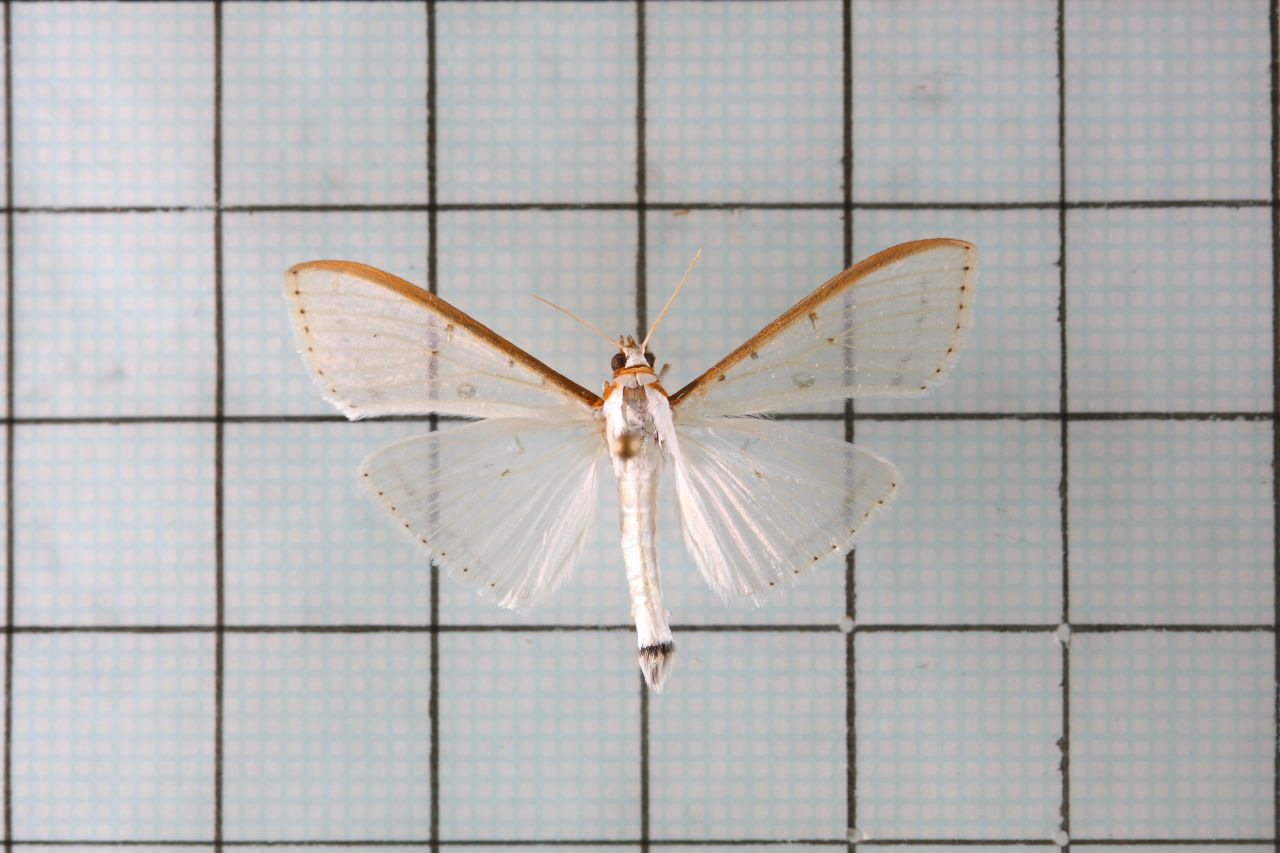

Scientific classification
- Kingdom: Animalia
- Phylum: Arthropoda
- Class: Insecta
- Order: Lepidoptera
- Family: Crambidae
- Genus: Palpita
- Species: P. nigropunctalis

Binomial name
- Palpita nigropunctalis (Bremer, 1864)

Synonyms
- Margarodes nigropunctalis Bremer, 1864; Margaronia neomera Butler, 1878

= Palpita nigropunctalis =

Species of moth

Palpita nigropunctalis, the lilac pyralid, is a moth of the family Crambidae. It is found in eastern Asia, including China (Hebei, Liaoning, Jilin, Heilongjiang, Zhejiang, Henan, Hubei, Sichuan, Guizhou, Yunnan, Shaanxi), Taiwan, Korea, Japan and the Russian Far East (Siberia, Kuriles, Sakhalin).

The wingspan is 29–31 mm. Adults are on wing from April to October. Adults are on wing from late March to early April, from mid May to early June and from early September to mid November in Japan. There are three generations per year.

The larvae feed on the flowers, fruits and leaves of Ligustrum species, including Ligustrum japonicum and Ligustrum lucidum. They have also been recorded on Fraxinus mandschurica. First-instar larvae occur three times per year in Japan (in late April to early May, mid to late September and early to mid October).
