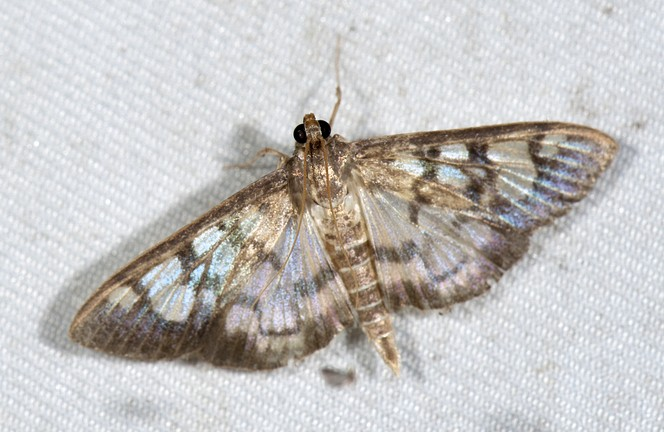

Scientific classification
- Domain: Eukaryota
- Kingdom: Animalia
- Phylum: Arthropoda
- Class: Insecta
- Order: Lepidoptera
- Family: Crambidae
- Genus: Syllepte
- Species: S. taiwanalis

Binomial name
- Syllepte taiwanalis Shibuya, 1928

= Syllepte taiwanalis =

Species of moth

Syllepte taiwanalis is a species of moth in the family Crambidae. It is found in Taiwan.
