= Nemacerota tancrei =

Scientific classification
- Domain: Eukaryota
- Kingdom: Animalia
- Phylum: Arthropoda
- Class: Insecta
- Order: Lepidoptera
- Family: Drepanidae
- Genus: Nemacerota
- Species: N. tancrei

Binomial name
- Nemacerota tancrei (Graeser, 1888)

Synonyms
- Cymatophora tancrei Graeser, 1888; Togaria suzukiana Matsumura, 1921; Togaria takaozana Matsumura, 1929; Palimpsestis hoenei Sick, 1941; Palimpsestis tokotana Bryk, 1942; Togaria tancrei Graeser, 1888

Species of false owlet moth

Nemacerota tancrei is a moth in the family Drepanidae. It was described by Ludwig Carl Friedrich Graeser in 1888. It is found in the Russian Far East, the Korean Peninsula, Japan and China (Heilongjiang, Jilin, eastern Inner Mongolia).
