= Pyrausta chrysitis =

Scientific classification
- Domain: Eukaryota
- Kingdom: Animalia
- Phylum: Arthropoda
- Class: Insecta
- Order: Lepidoptera
- Family: Crambidae
- Genus: Pyrausta
- Species: P. chrysitis

Binomial name
- Pyrausta chrysitis Butler, 1881

Species of moth

Pyrausta chrysitis is a moth in the family Crambidae. It was described by Arthur Gardiner Butler in 1881. It is found in Japan.
