= Scoparia submolestalis =

Scientific classification
- Kingdom: Animalia
- Phylum: Arthropoda
- Class: Insecta
- Order: Lepidoptera
- Family: Crambidae
- Genus: Scoparia
- Species: S. submolestalis

Binomial name
- Scoparia submolestalis Inoue, 1982

Species of moth

Scoparia submolestalis is a moth in the family Crambidae. It was described by Hiroshi Inoue in 1982. It is found in Japan.
