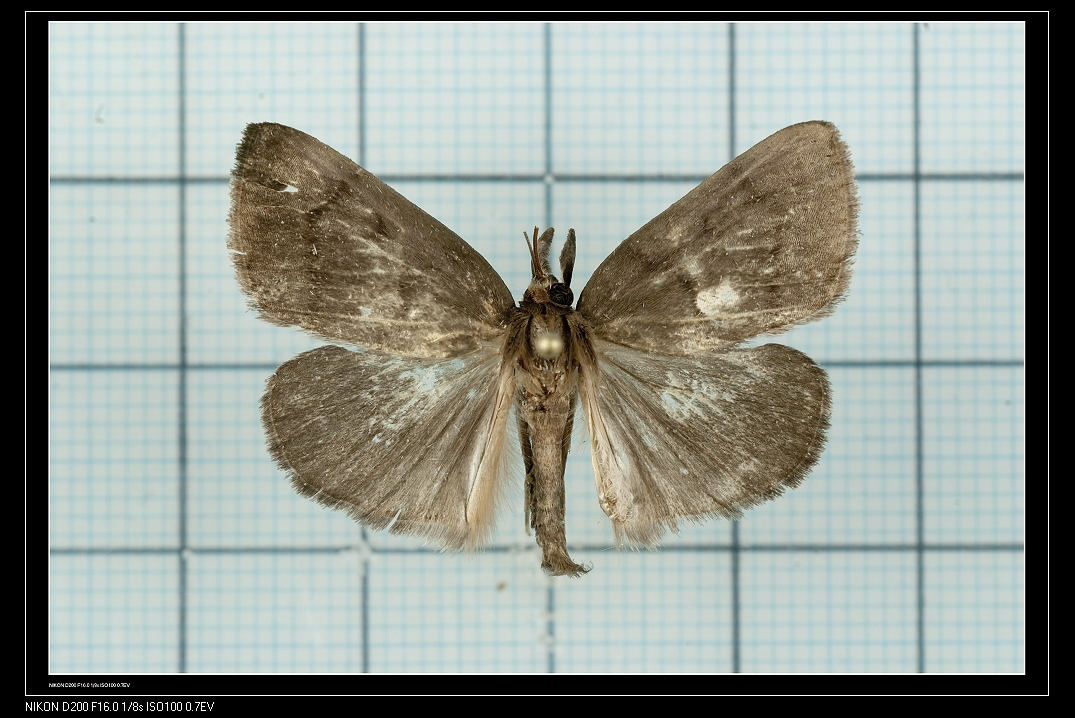

Scientific classification
- Kingdom: Animalia
- Phylum: Arthropoda
- Clade: Pancrustacea
- Class: Insecta
- Order: Lepidoptera
- Family: Pyralidae
- Genus: Trebania
- Species: T. flavifrontalis

Binomial name
- Trebania flavifrontalis (Leech, 1889)

Synonyms
- Propachys flavifrontalis Leech, 1889

= Trebania flavifrontalis =

Species of moth

Trebania flavifrontalis is a species of snout moth. It is found in Korea, Japan and China.

The wingspan is 33–35 mm. The ground colour of the wings is dark grayish brown. Adults are on wing in July.
