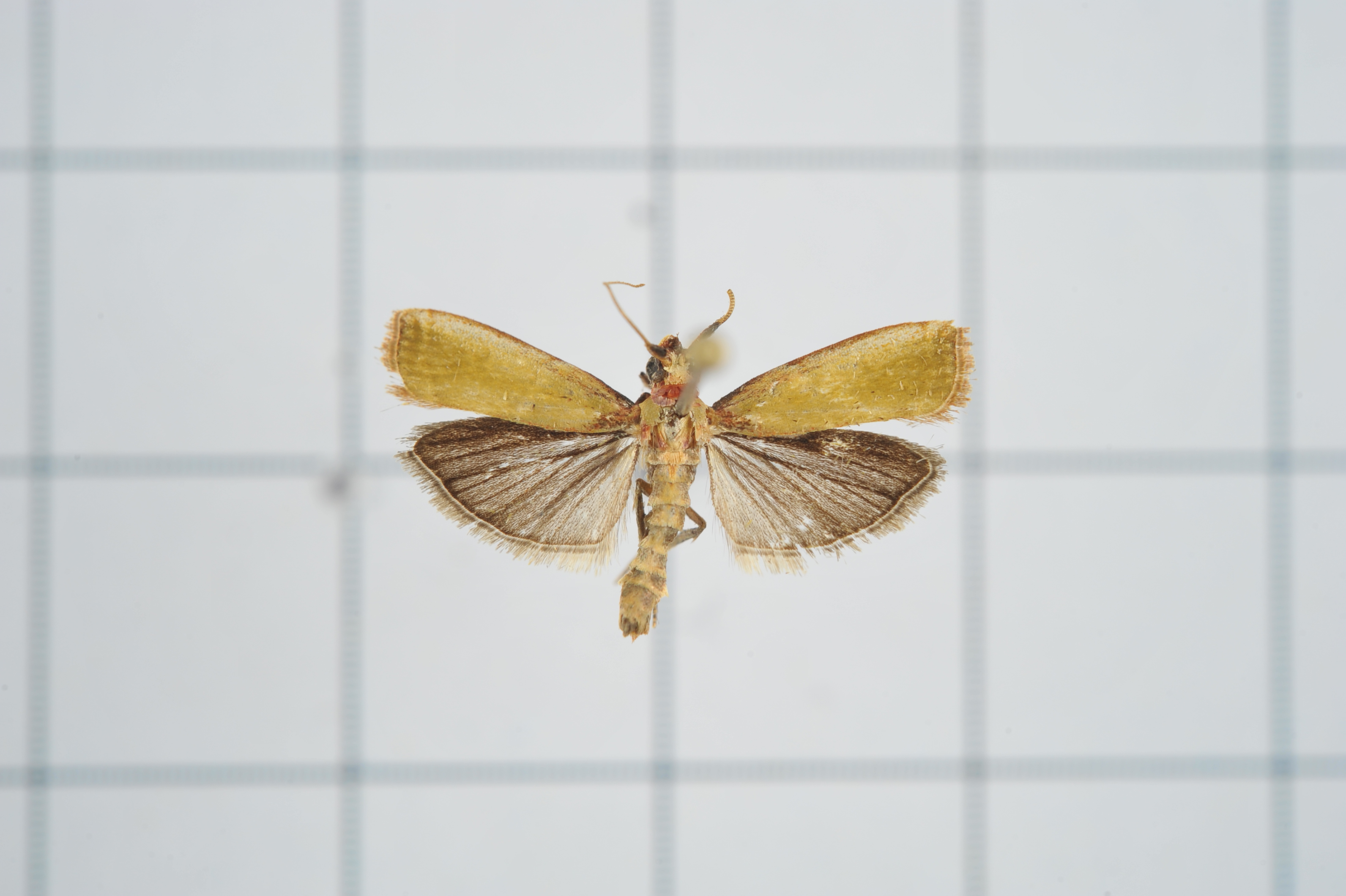

Scientific classification
- Kingdom: Animalia
- Phylum: Arthropoda
- Class: Insecta
- Order: Lepidoptera
- Family: Pyralidae
- Genus: Volobilis
- Species: V. chloropterella

Binomial name
- Volobilis chloropterella Hampson, 1896

= Volobilis chloropterella =

Species of moth

Volobilis chloropterella is a moth of the family Pyralidae first described by George Hampson in 1896. It is found in Japan, Taiwan and Sri Lanka.
