= Achlya longipennis =

Scientific classification
- Kingdom: Animalia
- Phylum: Arthropoda
- Class: Insecta
- Order: Lepidoptera
- Family: Drepanidae
- Genus: Achyla
- Species: A. longipennis

Binomial name
- Achlya longipennis Inoue, 1972

Species of false owlet moth

Achlya longipennis is a moth in the family Drepanidae. It was described by Hiroshi Inoue in 1972. It is found in Japan (Honshu, Hokkaido) and the Russian Far East. The habitat consists of various types of mixed and broad-leaved forests.
