= Termioptycha margarita =

Scientific classification
- Kingdom: Animalia
- Phylum: Arthropoda
- Class: Insecta
- Order: Lepidoptera
- Family: Pyralidae
- Genus: Termioptycha
- Species: T. margarita

Binomial name
- Termioptycha margarita Butler, 1879

Synonyms
- Locastra margarita Butler, 1879; Macalla margarita (Butler): Hampson, 1896; Termioptycha margarita (Butler): Mutuura, 1957; Locastra lativitta Moore, 1888

Species of moth

Termioptycha margarita is a moth in the family Pyralidae. It is found in Japan, Taiwan, and probably in Sri Lanka.
