= Ostrinia zaguliaevi =

Scientific classification
- Domain: Eukaryota
- Kingdom: Animalia
- Phylum: Arthropoda
- Class: Insecta
- Order: Lepidoptera
- Family: Crambidae
- Genus: Ostrinia
- Species: O. zaguliaevi

Binomial name
- Ostrinia zaguliaevi Mutuura & Munroe, 1970

Species of moth

Ostrinia zaguliaevi is a moth in the family Crambidae. It was described by Akira Mutuura and Eugene G. Munroe in 1970. It is found in the Russian Far East, Japan and China.

== Subspecies ==
- Ostrinia zaguliaevi zaguliaevi (Russia: Amur)
- Ostrinia zaguliaevi honshuensis Mutuura & Munroe, 1970 (Japan: Honshu)
- Ostrinia zaguliaevi kyushuensis Mutuura & Munroe, 1970 (Japan: Kyushu)
- Ostrinia zaguliaevi ryukyuensis Mutuura & Munroe, 1970 (Japan: Ryukyus)
- Ostrinia zaguliaevi tienmuensis Mutuura & Munroe, 1970 (China: Chekiang)
