= Scoparia yakushimana =

Scientific classification
- Kingdom: Animalia
- Phylum: Arthropoda
- Class: Insecta
- Order: Lepidoptera
- Family: Crambidae
- Genus: Scoparia
- Species: S. yakushimana

Binomial name
- Scoparia yakushimana Inoue, 1982

Species of moth

Scoparia yakushimana is a moth in the family Crambidae. It was described by Inoue in 1982. It is found in Japan (Yakushima).
