= Scoparia congestalis =

Scientific classification
- Kingdom: Animalia
- Phylum: Arthropoda
- Class: Insecta
- Order: Lepidoptera
- Family: Crambidae
- Genus: Scoparia
- Species: S. congestalis

Binomial name
- Scoparia congestalis Walker, 1859

Synonyms
- Scoparia isochroalis Hampson, 1907; Scoparia melanomaculosa Inoue, 1982

Species of moth

Scoparia congestalis is a moth in the family Crambidae. It was described by Francis Walker in 1859. It is found in Japan, Sri Lanka, Taiwan, Korea, Pakistan, Russia and China (Anhui, Fujian, Gansu, Guangxi, Guizhou, Henan, Hong Kong, Hubei, Hunan, Jiangxi, Shaanxi, Shanghai, Sichuan, Tianjin, Xizang, Yunnan, Zhejiang).
