= Eudonia puellaris =

Scientific classification
- Kingdom: Animalia
- Phylum: Arthropoda
- Class: Insecta
- Order: Lepidoptera
- Family: Crambidae
- Genus: Eudonia
- Species: E. puellaris

Binomial name
- Eudonia puellaris Sasaki, 1991

Species of moth

Eudonia puellaris is a moth in the family Crambidae. It was described by Sasaki in 1991. It is found in Japan, Taiwan, China (Chongqin, Fujian, Gansu, Guizhou, Henan, Hebei, Hubei, Jiangsu, Liaoning, Shaanxi, Sichuan, Tianjin, Yunnan, Zhejiang), and Russia.
