= Syllepte fuscomarginalis =

Scientific classification
- Domain: Eukaryota
- Kingdom: Animalia
- Phylum: Arthropoda
- Class: Insecta
- Order: Lepidoptera
- Family: Crambidae
- Genus: Syllepte
- Species: S. fuscomarginalis

Binomial name
- Syllepte fuscomarginalis (Leech, 1889)

Synonyms
- Botys fuscomarginalis Leech, 1889

Species of moth

Syllepte fuscomarginalis is a moth in the family Crambidae. It was described by John Henry Leech in 1889. It is found in Japan (Honshu) and western China.
