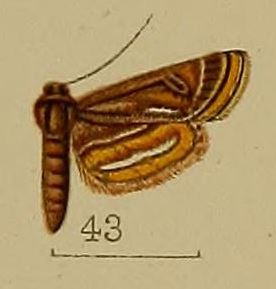

Scientific classification
- Kingdom: Animalia
- Phylum: Arthropoda
- Clade: Pancrustacea
- Class: Insecta
- Order: Lepidoptera
- Family: Crambidae
- Subfamily: Acentropinae
- Genus: Oligostigma; Guenée, 1854

= Oligostigma =

Genus of moths

Oligostigma is a genus of moths of the family Crambidae described by Achille Guenée in 1854.

== Species ==
- Oligostigma chrysota (Meyrick, 1886)
- Oligostigma ducale Schaus, 1906
- Oligostigma ectogonalis Hampson, 1906
- Oligostigma flavialbalis Hampson, 1917
- Oligostigma flavimarginale (Warren, 1899)
- Oligostigma flavipictalis Hampson, 1917
- Oligostigma juncealis Guenée, 1854
- Oligostigma metazonalis (Hampson, 1906)
- Oligostigma odrianale Schaus, 1924
- Oligostigma phoedralis (Walker, 1859)
- Oligostigma rufiterminalis Hampson, 1917
- Oligostigma semimarginale Dyar, 1914

== Former species ==
- Oligostigma albifurcalis (Hampson, 1906)
- Oligostigma alicialis (Hampson, 1908)
- Oligostigma andreusialis (Hampson, 1912)
- Oligostigma angustalis (Sauber in Semper, 1899)
- Oligostigma araealis (Hampson, 1897)
- Oligostigma auropunctalis (Hampson, 1903)
- Oligostigma chrysozonalis (Hampson, 1912)
- Oligostigma excisa (Swinhoe, 1901)
- Oligostigma fumibasalis (Hampson, 1896)
- Oligostigma hapilista (Swinhoe, 1892)
- Oligostigma melanotalis (Hampson, 1906)
- Oligostigma ornatum (Moore, 1885)
- Oligostigma parvalis Moore, 1877
