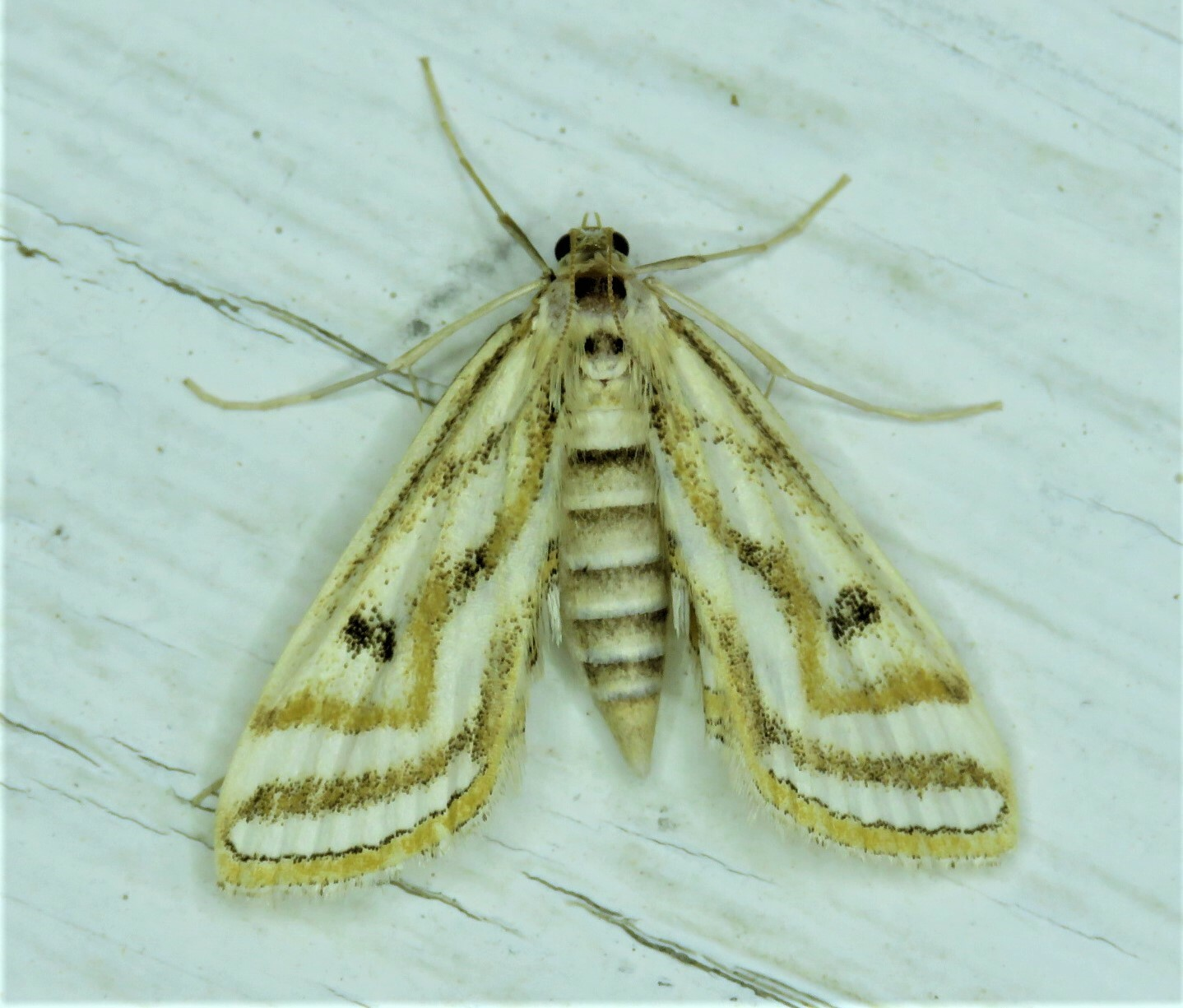
- Parapoynx curviferalis

Scientific classification
- Kingdom: Animalia
- Phylum: Arthropoda
- Clade: Pancrustacea
- Class: Insecta
- Order: Lepidoptera
- Family: Crambidae
- Genus: Parapoynx
- Species: P. curviferalis

Binomial name
- Parapoynx curviferalis (Walker, 1866)

Synonyms
- Oligostigma curviferalis Walker, 1866

= Parapoynx curviferalis =

Species of moth

Parapoynx curviferalis is a species of moth in the family Crambidae. It was first described by Francis Walker in 1866. It is found in North America, where it has been recorded from New Brunswick to Florida and from Illinois to Alabama.

The wingspan is about 17 mm. Adults are nearly identical to Parapoynx badiusalis. Adults have been recorded on wing from June to August.
