= Eristena grisealis =

Scientific classification
- Kingdom: Animalia
- Phylum: Arthropoda
- Class: Insecta
- Order: Lepidoptera
- Family: Crambidae
- Subfamily: Acentropinae
- Genus: Eristena
- Species: E. grisealis

Binomial name
- Eristena grisealis Rothschild, 1915

Species of moth

Eristena grisealis is a species of moth in the family Crambidae. It was described by Rothschild in 1915. It is found in New Guinea.
