= Parapoynx fulguralis =

Scientific classification
- Kingdom: Animalia
- Phylum: Arthropoda
- Clade: Pancrustacea
- Class: Insecta
- Order: Lepidoptera
- Family: Crambidae
- Genus: Parapoynx
- Species: P. fulguralis

Binomial name
- Parapoynx fulguralis (Caradja & Meyrick, 1934)

Synonyms
- Nymphula fulguralis Caradja & Meyrick, 1934

Species of moth

Parapoynx fulguralis is a moth in the family Crambidae. It was described by Aristide Caradja and Edward Meyrick in 1934. It is found in the Chinese provinces of Guangdong, Yunnan and Sichuan.
