= Parapoynx endoralis =

Scientific classification
- Kingdom: Animalia
- Phylum: Arthropoda
- Clade: Pancrustacea
- Class: Insecta
- Order: Lepidoptera
- Family: Crambidae
- Genus: Parapoynx
- Species: P. endoralis

Binomial name
- Parapoynx endoralis (Walker, 1859)

Synonyms
- Hydrocampa endoralis Walker, 1859

Species of moth

Parapoynx endoralis is a moth in the family Crambidae. It was described by Francis Walker in 1859. It is found in Honduras.
