= Parapoynx distinctalis =

Scientific classification
- Kingdom: Animalia
- Phylum: Arthropoda
- Clade: Pancrustacea
- Class: Insecta
- Order: Lepidoptera
- Family: Crambidae
- Genus: Parapoynx
- Species: P. distinctalis

Binomial name
- Parapoynx distinctalis Snellen, 1875

Synonyms
- Nymphula distinctalis

Species of moth

Parapoynx distinctalis is a moth in the family Crambidae. It was described by Snellen in 1875. It is found in Colombia.
