= Eristena minutale =

Scientific classification
- Kingdom: Animalia
- Phylum: Arthropoda
- Class: Insecta
- Order: Lepidoptera
- Family: Crambidae
- Subfamily: Acentropinae
- Genus: Eristena
- Species: E. minutale

Binomial name
- Eristena minutale (Caradja, 1932)

Synonyms
- Oligostigma minutale Caradja, 1932

Species of moth

Eristena minutale is a species of moth in the family Crambidae. It was described by Aristide Caradja in 1932. It is found in China.
