= Parapoynx discoloralis =

Scientific classification
- Kingdom: Animalia
- Phylum: Arthropoda
- Clade: Pancrustacea
- Class: Insecta
- Order: Lepidoptera
- Family: Crambidae
- Genus: Parapoynx
- Species: P. discoloralis

Binomial name
- Parapoynx discoloralis (Walker, 1866)

Synonyms
- Hydrocampa discoloralis Walker, 1866

Species of moth

Parapoynx discoloralis is a moth in the family Crambidae. It was described by Francis Walker in 1866. It is found in Australia.
