= Eristena argentata =

Scientific classification
- Kingdom: Animalia
- Phylum: Arthropoda
- Class: Insecta
- Order: Lepidoptera
- Family: Crambidae
- Subfamily: Acentropinae
- Genus: Eristena
- Species: E. argentata

Binomial name
- Eristena argentata Yoshiyasu, 1988

Species of moth

Eristena argentata is a species of moth in the family Crambidae. It was described by Yoshiyasu in 1988. It is found in Japan, where it has been recorded from the Amami Islands.
