= Parapoynx ophiaula =

Scientific classification
- Kingdom: Animalia
- Phylum: Arthropoda
- Clade: Pancrustacea
- Class: Insecta
- Order: Lepidoptera
- Family: Crambidae
- Genus: Parapoynx
- Species: P. ophiaula

Binomial name
- Parapoynx ophiaula (Meyrick, 1936)

Synonyms
- Nymphula ophiaula Meyrick, 1936

Species of moth

Parapoynx ophiaula is a moth in the family Crambidae. It was described by Edward Meyrick in 1936. It is found in the south-eastern part of the Democratic Republic of the Congo and north-western Zambia.

The wingspan is 15–16 mm. Adults have been recorded on wing from January to March in May, July and December.
