= Eristena tanongchiti =

Scientific classification
- Kingdom: Animalia
- Phylum: Arthropoda
- Clade: Pancrustacea
- Class: Insecta
- Order: Lepidoptera
- Family: Crambidae
- Subfamily: Acentropinae
- Genus: Eristena
- Species: E. tanongchiti

Binomial name
- Eristena tanongchiti Yoshiyasu, 1984

Species of moth

Eristena tanongchiti is a species of moth in the family Crambidae. It was described by Yoshiyasu in 1984. It is found in Thailand and China.
