= Parapoynx indomitalis =

Scientific classification
- Kingdom: Animalia
- Phylum: Arthropoda
- Clade: Pancrustacea
- Class: Insecta
- Order: Lepidoptera
- Family: Crambidae
- Genus: Parapoynx
- Species: P. indomitalis

Binomial name
- Parapoynx indomitalis Berg, 1876

Synonyms
- Nymphula indomitalis Berg, 1876

Species of moth

Parapoynx indomitalis is a moth in the family Crambidae. It was described by Carlos Berg in 1876. It is found in Uruguay.
