= Eristena fulva =

Scientific classification
- Kingdom: Animalia
- Phylum: Arthropoda
- Class: Insecta
- Order: Lepidoptera
- Family: Crambidae
- Subfamily: Acentropinae
- Genus: Eristena
- Species: E. fulva

Binomial name
- Eristena fulva Yoshiyasu, 1987

Species of moth

Eristena fulva is a species of moth in the family Crambidae. It was described by Yoshiyasu in 1987. It is found in Thailand.
