= Parapoynx nivalis =

Scientific classification
- Kingdom: Animalia
- Phylum: Arthropoda
- Clade: Pancrustacea
- Class: Insecta
- Order: Lepidoptera
- Family: Crambidae
- Genus: Parapoynx
- Species: P. nivalis

Binomial name
- Parapoynx nivalis (Denis & Schiffermuller, 1775)

Synonyms
- Pyralis nivalis Denis & Schiffermuller, 1775; Phalaena nivealis Fabricius, 1794; Crambus niveus Fabricius, 1798; Phalaena candidata Fabricius, 1787

Species of moth

Parapoynx nivalis is a species of moth in the family Crambidae. It is found in Germany, Poland, the Czech Republic, Austria, Slovakia, Hungary, Bosnia and Herzegovina, Bulgaria, Romania, Ukraine and Russia.
