= Oligostigma semimarginale =

Scientific classification
- Kingdom: Animalia
- Phylum: Arthropoda
- Class: Insecta
- Order: Lepidoptera
- Family: Crambidae
- Genus: Oligostigma
- Species: O. semimarginale

Binomial name
- Oligostigma semimarginale Dyar, 1914

Species of moth

Oligostigma semimarginale is a moth in the family Crambidae. It was described by Harrison Gray Dyar Jr. in 1914. It is found in Panama.
