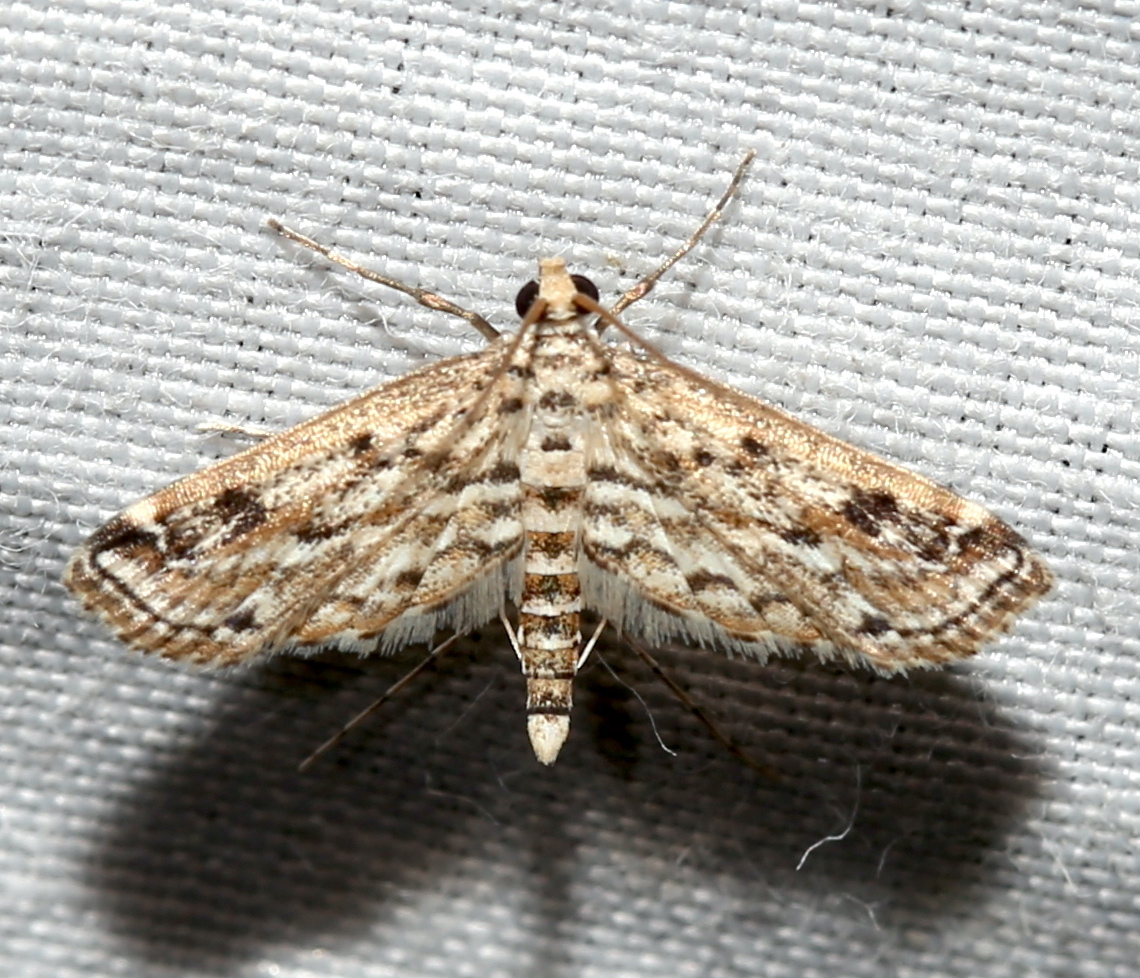

Scientific classification
- Kingdom: Animalia
- Phylum: Arthropoda
- Clade: Pancrustacea
- Class: Insecta
- Order: Lepidoptera
- Family: Crambidae
- Genus: Parapoynx
- Species: P. allionealis

Binomial name
- Parapoynx allionealis (Walker, 1859)

Synonyms
- Paraponyx allionealis Walker, 1859; Parapoynx aptalis Lederer, 1863; Hydrocampa allionealis itealis Walker, 1859; Paraponyx plenilinealis Grote, 1881; Parapoynx cretacealis Lederer, 1863

= Parapoynx allionealis =

Species of moth

Parapoynx allionealis, the watermilfoil leafcutter moth, is a moth in the family Crambidae. It was described by Francis Walker in 1859. It is found in North America, where it has been recorded from Alabama, Florida, Georgia, Indiana, Louisiana, Maine, Manitoba, Maryland, Massachusetts, Michigan, Minnesota, Mississippi, New Brunswick, New Hampshire, New Jersey, New York, North Carolina, Nova Scotia, Ohio, Oklahoma, Ontario, Quebec, South Carolina, Tennessee and Texas.

Adults have been recorded on wing year round in the southern part of the range.

The larvae feed on various aquatic plants, including Nymphaea odorata, Potamogeton natans, Potamogeton pusillus, Myriophyllum spicatum, Myriophyllum heterophyllum, Hydrochtoa caroliniensis, Eleocharis vivipara, Utricularia inflata and Salvinia rotundifolia. They live in a portable case made of plant material.
