= Parapoynx longialata =

Scientific classification
- Kingdom: Animalia
- Phylum: Arthropoda
- Clade: Pancrustacea
- Class: Insecta
- Order: Lepidoptera
- Family: Crambidae
- Genus: Parapoynx
- Species: P. longialata

Binomial name
- Parapoynx longialata Yoshiyasu, 1983

Species of moth

Parapoynx longialata is a moth in the family Crambidae. It was described by Yoshiyasu in 1983. It is found in Thailand.
