= Oligostigma phoedralis =

Scientific classification
- Kingdom: Animalia
- Phylum: Arthropoda
- Class: Insecta
- Order: Lepidoptera
- Family: Crambidae
- Genus: Oligostigma
- Species: O. phoedralis

Binomial name
- Oligostigma phoedralis (Walker, 1859)

Synonyms
- Cataclysta phoedralis Walker, 1859

Species of moth

Oligostigma phoedralis is a moth in the family Crambidae. It was described by Francis Walker in 1859. It is found in Brazil.
