= Eristena straminealis =

Scientific classification
- Kingdom: Animalia
- Phylum: Arthropoda
- Class: Insecta
- Order: Lepidoptera
- Family: Crambidae
- Subfamily: Acentropinae
- Genus: Eristena
- Species: E. straminealis

Binomial name
- Eristena straminealis Hampson, 1893

Species of moth

Eristena straminealis is a species of moth in the family Crambidae. It was described by George Hampson in 1893. It is found in Sikkim, India.
