= Eristena endosaris =

Scientific classification
- Kingdom: Animalia
- Phylum: Arthropoda
- Class: Insecta
- Order: Lepidoptera
- Family: Crambidae
- Subfamily: Acentropinae
- Genus: Eristena
- Species: E. endosaris

Binomial name
- Eristena endosaris (Meyrick, 1894)

Synonyms
- Oligostigma endosaris Meyrick, 1894

Species of moth

Eristena endosaris is a species of moth in the family Crambidae. It was described by Edward Meyrick in 1894. It is found on Borneo.
