= Parapoynx fregonalis =

Scientific classification
- Kingdom: Animalia
- Phylum: Arthropoda
- Clade: Pancrustacea
- Class: Insecta
- Order: Lepidoptera
- Family: Crambidae
- Genus: Parapoynx
- Species: P. fregonalis

Binomial name
- Parapoynx fregonalis Snellen, 1880

Species of moth

Parapoynx fregonalis is a moth in the family Crambidae. It was described by Snellen in 1880. It is found on Sulawesi.
