= Parapoynx euryscia =

Scientific classification
- Kingdom: Animalia
- Phylum: Arthropoda
- Clade: Pancrustacea
- Class: Insecta
- Order: Lepidoptera
- Family: Crambidae
- Genus: Parapoynx
- Species: P. euryscia

Binomial name
- Parapoynx euryscia (Meyrick, 1885)

Synonyms
- Hydreuretis euryscia Meyrick, 1885; Cosmophylla oxygramma Turner, 1908

Species of moth

Parapoynx euryscia is a moth in the family Crambidae. It was described by Edward Meyrick in 1885. It is found in Australia, where it has been recorded from Tasmania and Victoria.

The wingspan is about 23 mm. The forewings are white with the veins indistinctly indicated with pale fuscous. The costal edge is fuscous and the upper and lower medians and submedian fold are marked by strong cloudy dark fuscous streaks from the base to the middle of the disc. The hindwings are white with a cloudy fuscous spot towards the middle of the disc and an indistinct fuscous streak.
