= Oligostigma flavimarginale =

Scientific classification
- Domain: Eukaryota
- Kingdom: Animalia
- Phylum: Arthropoda
- Class: Insecta
- Order: Lepidoptera
- Family: Crambidae
- Genus: Oligostigma
- Species: O. flavimarginale

Binomial name
- Oligostigma flavimarginale (Warren, 1899)

Synonyms
- Paraponyx flavimarginale Warren, 1899; Paraponyx flavimarginalis; Oligostigma flavimarginalis

Species of moth

Oligostigma flavimarginale is a moth in the family Crambidae. It was described by Warren in 1899. It is found in Brazil.
