= Agassiziella kwangtungiale =

Scientific classification
- Kingdom: Animalia
- Phylum: Arthropoda
- Clade: Pancrustacea
- Class: Insecta
- Order: Lepidoptera
- Family: Crambidae
- Genus: Agassiziella
- Species: A. kwangtungiale

Binomial name
- Agassiziella kwangtungiale (Caradja, 1925)

Synonyms
- Oligostigma kwangtungiale Caradja, 1925

Species of moth

Agassiziella kwangtungiale is a species of moth in the family Crambidae. It is found in China.
