= Eristena mesilauensis =

Scientific classification
- Kingdom: Animalia
- Phylum: Arthropoda
- Clade: Pancrustacea
- Class: Insecta
- Order: Lepidoptera
- Family: Crambidae
- Subfamily: Acentropinae
- Genus: Eristena
- Species: E. mesilauensis

Binomial name
- Eristena mesilauensis Mey, 2009

Species of moth

Eristena mesilauensis is a species of moth in the family Crambidae. It was described by Wolfram Mey in 2009. It is found on Sabah.
