= Parapoynx gualbertalis =

Scientific classification
- Kingdom: Animalia
- Phylum: Arthropoda
- Clade: Pancrustacea
- Class: Insecta
- Order: Lepidoptera
- Family: Crambidae
- Genus: Parapoynx
- Species: P. gualbertalis

Binomial name
- Parapoynx gualbertalis (Schaus, 1924)

Synonyms
- Parthenodes gualbertalis Schaus, 1924

Species of moth

Parapoynx gualbertalis is a moth in the family Crambidae. It was described by Schaus in 1924. It is found in Suriname.
