= Parapoynx candida =

Scientific classification
- Kingdom: Animalia
- Phylum: Arthropoda
- Clade: Pancrustacea
- Class: Insecta
- Order: Lepidoptera
- Family: Crambidae
- Genus: Parapoynx
- Species: P. candida

Binomial name
- Parapoynx candida You & Li, 2005

Species of moth

Parapoynx candida is a moth in the family Crambidae. It was described by Ping You and Hou-Hun Li in 2005. It is found in China.
