= Oligostigma flavipictalis =

Scientific classification
- Kingdom: Animalia
- Phylum: Arthropoda
- Class: Insecta
- Order: Lepidoptera
- Family: Crambidae
- Genus: Oligostigma
- Species: O. flavipictalis

Binomial name
- Oligostigma flavipictalis Hampson, 1917

Species of moth

Oligostigma flavipictalis is a moth in the family Crambidae. It was described by George Hampson in 1917. It is found in Singapore.
