= Oligostigma juncealis =

Scientific classification
- Kingdom: Animalia
- Phylum: Arthropoda
- Class: Insecta
- Order: Lepidoptera
- Family: Crambidae
- Genus: Oligostigma
- Species: O. juncealis

Binomial name
- Oligostigma juncealis Guenée, 1854

Synonyms
- Oligostigma junceale

Species of moth

Oligostigma juncealis is a moth in the family Crambidae. It was described by Achille Guenée in 1854. It is found in French Guiana.
