= Eristena medexpansa =

Scientific classification
- Kingdom: Animalia
- Phylum: Arthropoda
- Clade: Pancrustacea
- Class: Insecta
- Order: Lepidoptera
- Family: Crambidae
- Subfamily: Acentropinae
- Genus: Eristena
- Species: E. medexpansa

Binomial name
- Eristena medexpansa You, Li & Wang, 2003

Species of moth

Eristena medexpansa is a species of moth in the family Crambidae. It was described by Ping You, Hou-Hun Li and Shu-Xia Wang in 2003. It is found in Guangxi, China.
