= Agassiziella picalis =

Scientific classification
- Kingdom: Animalia
- Phylum: Arthropoda
- Clade: Pancrustacea
- Class: Insecta
- Order: Lepidoptera
- Family: Crambidae
- Genus: Agassiziella
- Species: A. picalis

Binomial name
- Agassiziella picalis (Guenée, 1854)

Synonyms
- Hydrocampa picalis Guenée, 1854

Species of moth

Agassiziella picalis is a species of moth in the family Crambidae. It is found in central India.
