= Parapoynx andalusica =

Scientific classification
- Kingdom: Animalia
- Phylum: Arthropoda
- Clade: Pancrustacea
- Class: Insecta
- Order: Lepidoptera
- Family: Crambidae
- Genus: Parapoynx
- Species: P. andalusica

Binomial name
- Parapoynx andalusica Speidel, 1982

Synonyms
- Parapoynx andalusicum

Species of moth

Parapoynx andalusica is a species of moth in the family Crambidae. It is found in Spain and Portugal.
