= Eristena szechuanalis =

Scientific classification
- Kingdom: Animalia
- Phylum: Arthropoda
- Clade: Pancrustacea
- Class: Insecta
- Order: Lepidoptera
- Family: Crambidae
- Subfamily: Acentropinae
- Genus: Eristena
- Species: E. szechuanalis

Binomial name
- Eristena szechuanalis (Caradja, 1934)

Synonyms
- Oligostigma bifurcale var. szechuanalis Caradja, 1934

Species of moth

Eristena szechuanalis is a species of moth in the family Crambidae. It was described by Aristide Caradja in 1934. It is found in Sichuan, China.
