= Agassiziella niveinotatum =

Scientific classification
- Kingdom: Animalia
- Phylum: Arthropoda
- Clade: Pancrustacea
- Class: Insecta
- Order: Lepidoptera
- Family: Crambidae
- Genus: Agassiziella
- Species: A. niveinotatum

Binomial name
- Agassiziella niveinotatum (Hampson, 1893)

Synonyms
- Oligostigma niveinotatum Hampson, 1893

Species of moth

Agassiziella niveinotatum is a species of moth in the family Crambidae. It is found in Sri Lanka.
