= Parapoynx votalis =

Scientific classification
- Kingdom: Animalia
- Phylum: Arthropoda
- Clade: Pancrustacea
- Class: Insecta
- Order: Lepidoptera
- Family: Crambidae
- Genus: Parapoynx
- Species: P. votalis

Binomial name
- Parapoynx votalis (Walker, 1859)

Synonyms
- Oligostigma votalis Walker, 1859; Nymphula votalis

Species of moth

Parapoynx votalis is a moth in the family Crambidae. It was described by Francis Walker in 1859. It is found in Sri Lanka.
