= Parapoynx ussuriensis =

Scientific classification
- Kingdom: Animalia
- Phylum: Arthropoda
- Clade: Pancrustacea
- Class: Insecta
- Order: Lepidoptera
- Family: Crambidae
- Genus: Parapoynx
- Species: P. ussuriensis

Binomial name
- Parapoynx ussuriensis (Rebel, 1910)

Synonyms
- Nymphula ussuriensis Rebel, 1910; Nymphula munakatae Matsumura, 1917; Nymphula ussurialis Caradja, 1917

Species of moth

Parapoynx ussuriensis is a moth in the family Crambidae. It was described by Rebel in 1910. It is found in Russia and Japan.
