= Parapoynx affinialis =

Scientific classification
- Kingdom: Animalia
- Phylum: Arthropoda
- Clade: Pancrustacea
- Class: Insecta
- Order: Lepidoptera
- Family: Crambidae
- Genus: Parapoynx
- Species: P. affinialis

Binomial name
- Parapoynx affinialis Guenée, 1854

Synonyms
- Paraponyx affinialis; Oligostigma incommoda Butler, 1881; Nymphula fuscomarginata Bethune-Baker, 1894; Nymphula alaicalis Caradja, 1917

Species of moth

Parapoynx affinialis is a moth in the family Crambidae. It was described by Achille Guenée in 1854. It is found in Egypt and from the Middle East to India. It has also been recorded from Australia.
