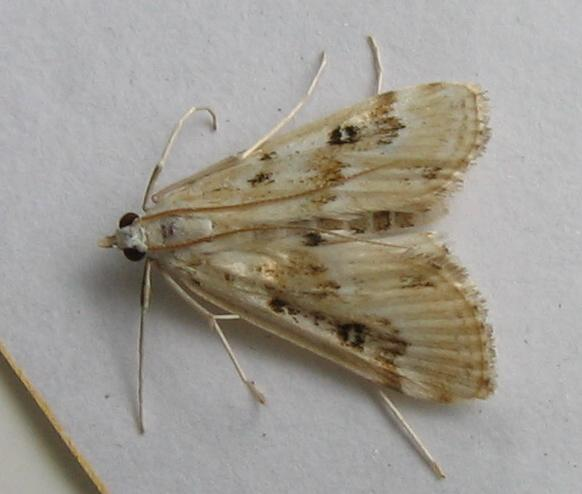
- Parapoynx stratiotata

Scientific classification
- Kingdom: Animalia
- Phylum: Arthropoda
- Class: Insecta
- Order: Lepidoptera
- Family: Crambidae
- Subfamily: Acentropinae
- Genus: Parapoynx; Hübner, 1825

Synonyms
- Cosmophylla Turner, 1908; Eustales Clemens, 1860; Hydreuretis Meyrick, 1885; Microdracon Warren, 1890; Nymphaeella Grote, 1880; Paraponyx Guenée, 1854; Sironia Clemens, 1860

= Parapoynx =

Genus of moths

Parapoynx is a genus of moths of the family Crambidae described by Jacob Hübner in 1825.

== Species ==
- Parapoynx affinialis Guenée, 1854
- Parapoynx allionealis Walker, 1859
- Parapoynx andalusicum Speidel, 1982
- Parapoynx andreusialis Hampson, 1912
- Parapoynx azialis Druce, 1896
- Parapoynx badiusalis Walker, 1859
- Parapoynx bilinealis Snellen, 1876
- Parapoynx bipunctalis Hampson, 1906
- Parapoynx candida You & Li in You & Li, 2005
- Parapoynx crisonalis Walker, 1859
- Parapoynx curviferalis Walker, 1866
- Parapoynx dentizonalis Hampson, 1897
- Parapoynx diminutalis Snellen, 1880
- Parapoynx discoloralis Walker, 1866
- Parapoynx distinctalis Snellen, 1875
- Parapoynx effrenatalis Berg, 1876
- Parapoynx endoralis Walker, 1859
- Parapoynx epimochla Turner, 1908
- Parapoynx euryscia Meyrick, 1885
- Parapoynx flavimarginalis Warren, 1889
- Parapoynx fluctuosalis Zeller, 1852
- Parapoynx fregonalis Snellen, 1880
- Parapoynx fulguralis Caradja & Meyrick, 1934
- Parapoynx fusalis Hampson, 1896
- Parapoynx fuscicostalis Hampson, 1896
- Parapoynx gualbertalis Schaus, 1924
- Parapoynx guenealis Snellen, 1875
- Parapoynx indomitalis Berg, 1876
- Parapoynx ingridae Guillermet, 2004
- Parapoynx insectalis Pryer, 1877
- Parapoynx leucographa Speidel, 2003
- Parapoynx leucostola Hampson, 1896
- Parapoynx likiangalis Caradja in Caradja & Meyrick, 1937
- Parapoynx longialata Yoshiyasu, 1983
- Parapoynx maculalis Clemens, 1860
- Parapoynx medusalis Walker, 1859
- Parapoynx minoralis Mabille, 1881
- Parapoynx moriutii Yoshiyasu, 2005
- Parapoynx nivalis Denis & Schiffermüller, 1775
- Parapoynx obscuralis Grote, 1881
- Parapoynx ophiaula Meyrick, 1936
- Parapoynx panpenealis Dyar, 1924
- Parapoynx plumbefusalis Hampson, 1917
- Parapoynx polydectalis Walker, 1859
- Parapoynx pycnarmonides Speidel, 2003
- Parapoynx qujingalis Chen, Song & Wu, 2006
- Parapoynx rectilinealis Yoshiyasu, 1985
- Parapoynx restingalis Da Silva & Nessimian, 1990
- Parapoynx seminealis Walker, 1859
- Parapoynx sinuosa T. P. Lucas, 1892
- Parapoynx stagnalis Zeller, 1852
- Parapoynx stratiotata Linnaeus, 1758 – ringed china-mark
- Parapoynx tenebralis Lower, 1902
- Parapoynx tullialis Walker, 1859
- Parapoynx ussuriensis Rebel, 1910
- Parapoynx villidalis Walker, 1859
- Parapoynx vittalis Bremer, 1864
- Parapoynx votalis Walker, 1859
- Parapoynx zambiensis Agassiz, 2012

== Former species ==
- Parapoynx circealis Walker, 1859
- Parapoynx maroccana Speidel, 1982
- Parapoynx tedyuscongalis Clemens, 1860
