= Parapoynx insectalis =

Scientific classification
- Kingdom: Animalia
- Phylum: Arthropoda
- Clade: Pancrustacea
- Class: Insecta
- Order: Lepidoptera
- Family: Crambidae
- Genus: Parapoynx
- Species: P. insectalis

Binomial name
- Parapoynx insectalis (Pryer, 1877)

Synonyms
- Oligostigma insectalis Pryer, 1877

Species of moth

Parapoynx insectalis is a moth in the family Crambidae. It was described by Pryer in 1877. It is found in China.
