= Parapoynx azialis =

Scientific classification
- Kingdom: Animalia
- Phylum: Arthropoda
- Clade: Pancrustacea
- Class: Insecta
- Order: Lepidoptera
- Family: Crambidae
- Genus: Parapoynx
- Species: P. azialis

Binomial name
- Parapoynx azialis (H. Druce, 1896)

Synonyms
- Paraponyx azialis H. Druce, 1896

Species of moth

Parapoynx azialis is a moth in the family Crambidae. It was described by Herbert Druce in 1896. It is found in Panama.
