= Parapoynx sinuosa =

Scientific classification
- Kingdom: Animalia
- Phylum: Arthropoda
- Clade: Pancrustacea
- Class: Insecta
- Order: Lepidoptera
- Family: Crambidae
- Genus: Parapoynx
- Species: P. sinuosa

Binomial name
- Parapoynx sinuosa (T. P. Lucas, 1892)

Synonyms
- Nymphula sinuosa T. P. Lucas, 1892

Species of moth

Parapoynx sinuosa is a moth in the family Crambidae. It was described by Thomas Pennington Lucas in 1892. It is found in Australia.
