= Parapoynx ingridae =

Scientific classification
- Kingdom: Animalia
- Phylum: Arthropoda
- Clade: Pancrustacea
- Class: Insecta
- Order: Lepidoptera
- Family: Crambidae
- Genus: Parapoynx
- Species: P. ingridae

Binomial name
- Parapoynx ingridae Guillermet, 2004

Species of moth

Parapoynx ingridae is a moth in the family Crambidae. It was described by Christian Guillermet in 2004. It is found on Réunion in the Indian Ocean.
