= Parapoynx fusalis =

Scientific classification
- Kingdom: Animalia
- Phylum: Arthropoda
- Clade: Pancrustacea
- Class: Insecta
- Order: Lepidoptera
- Family: Crambidae
- Genus: Parapoynx
- Species: P. fusalis

Binomial name
- Parapoynx fusalis (Hampson, 1896)

Synonyms
- Nymphula fusalis Hampson, 1896

Species of moth

Parapoynx fusalis is a moth in the family Crambidae. It was described by George Hampson in 1896. It is found in India.
