= Parapoynx bilinealis =

Scientific classification
- Kingdom: Animalia
- Phylum: Arthropoda
- Clade: Pancrustacea
- Class: Insecta
- Order: Lepidoptera
- Family: Crambidae
- Genus: Parapoynx
- Species: P. bilinealis

Binomial name
- Parapoynx bilinealis (Snellen, 1876)

Synonyms
- Oligostigma bilinealis Snellen, 1876

Species of moth

Parapoynx bilinealis is a moth in the family Crambidae. It was described by Snellen in 1876. It is found in India and Japan. It has also been recorded from Europe, where it was accidentally introduced.

The wingspan is 12–16 mm.

The larvae feed on aquatic plants.
