= Parapoynx flavimarginalis =

Scientific classification
- Kingdom: Animalia
- Phylum: Arthropoda
- Clade: Pancrustacea
- Class: Insecta
- Order: Lepidoptera
- Family: Crambidae
- Genus: Parapoynx
- Species: P. flavimarginalis

Binomial name
- Parapoynx flavimarginalis Warren, 1889

Species of moth

Parapoynx flavimarginalis is a moth in the family Crambidae. It was described by Warren in 1889. It is found in Brazil.
