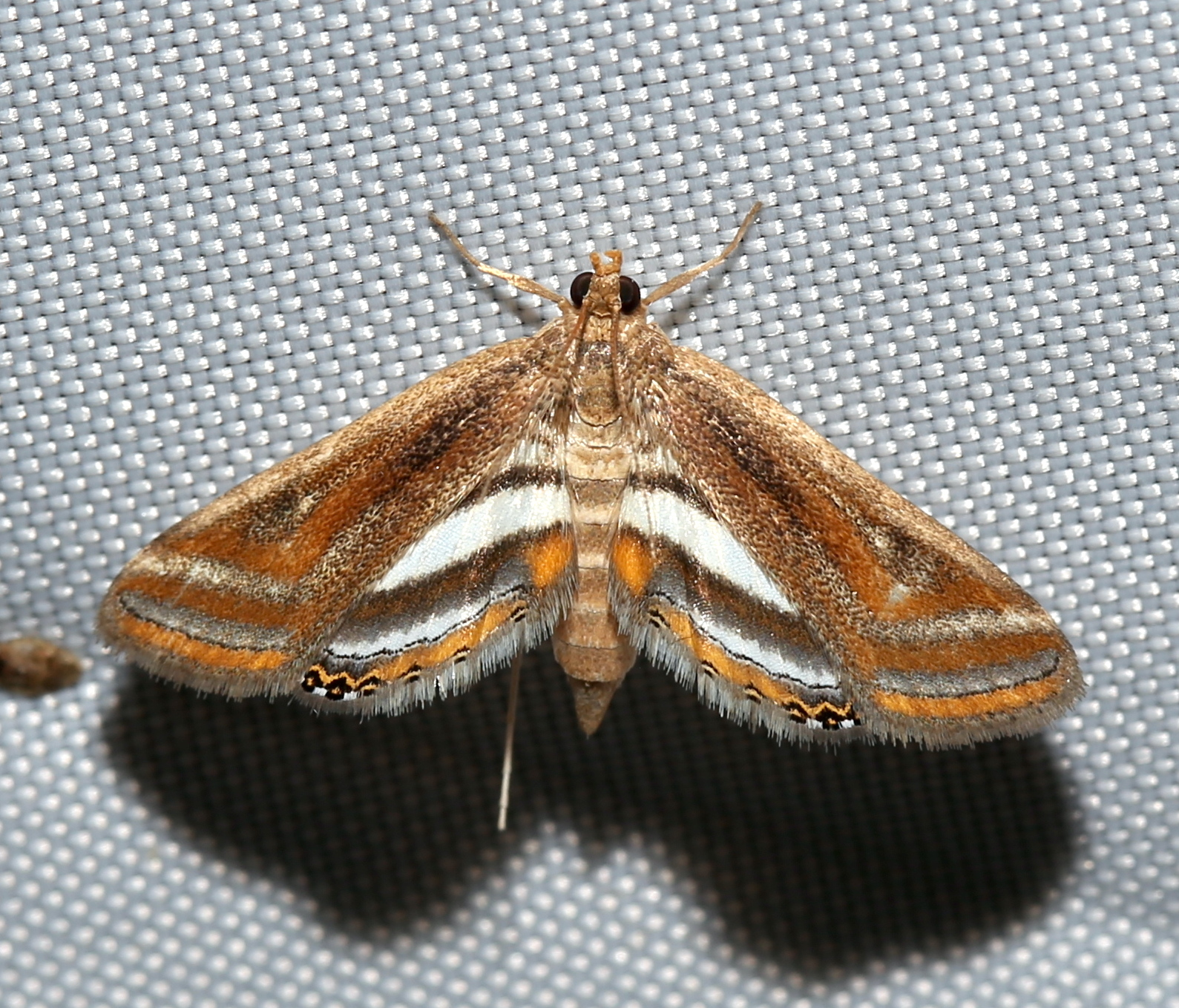

Scientific classification
- Kingdom: Animalia
- Phylum: Arthropoda
- Clade: Pancrustacea
- Class: Insecta
- Order: Lepidoptera
- Family: Crambidae
- Genus: Parapoynx
- Species: P. seminealis

Binomial name
- Parapoynx seminealis (Walker, 1859)

Synonyms
- Oligostigma seminealis Walker, 1859; Eustales tedyuscongalis Clemens, 1860

= Parapoynx seminealis =

Species of moth

Parapoynx seminealis, the floating-heart waterlily moth, is a moth in the family Crambidae. It was described by Francis Walker in 1859. It is found in North America, where it has been recorded from Florida, Georgia, Massachusetts, Mississippi, New Hampshire, Rhode Island, South Carolina and Texas.

The wingspan is about 20 mm. Adults have been recorded on wing year round in the southern part of the range.

The larvae feed on the leaves of Nymphoides aquatica and probably Nymphoides cordata or Nymphoides peltata.
