= Eristena shafferi =

Scientific classification
- Kingdom: Animalia
- Phylum: Arthropoda
- Class: Insecta
- Order: Lepidoptera
- Family: Crambidae
- Subfamily: Acentropinae
- Genus: Eristena
- Species: E. shafferi

Binomial name
- Eristena shafferi Murphy, 1989

Species of moth

Eristena shafferi is a species of moth in the family Crambidae. It was described by Dennis H. Murphy in 1989. It is found in Singapore.
