= Parapoynx vittalis =

Scientific classification
- Kingdom: Animalia
- Phylum: Arthropoda
- Clade: Pancrustacea
- Class: Insecta
- Order: Lepidoptera
- Family: Crambidae
- Genus: Parapoynx
- Species: P. vittalis

Binomial name
- Parapoynx vittalis (Bremer, 1864)

Synonyms
- Oligostigma vittalis Bremer, 1864; Oligostigma regularis Pryer, 1877

Species of moth

Parapoynx vittalis is a moth in the family Crambidae. It was described by Otto Vasilievich Bremer in 1864. It is found in Russia, China, Taiwan and Japan.

The wingspan is 13–17 mm.
