= Parapoynx bipunctalis =

Scientific classification
- Kingdom: Animalia
- Phylum: Arthropoda
- Clade: Pancrustacea
- Class: Insecta
- Order: Lepidoptera
- Family: Crambidae
- Genus: Parapoynx
- Species: P. bipunctalis

Binomial name
- Parapoynx bipunctalis (Hampson, 1906)

Synonyms
- Oligostigma bipunctalis Hampson, 1906; Oligostgma piperitalis Hampson, 1917

Species of moth

Parapoynx bipunctalis is a moth in the family Crambidae. It was described by George Hampson in 1906. It is found in Sudan, Uganda, the Democratic Republic of the Congo, Nigeria, Niger, Benin, Ivory Coast, the Gambia and Senegal.

The wingspan is 13–19 mm. Adults have been recorded on wing in February and from June to November.
