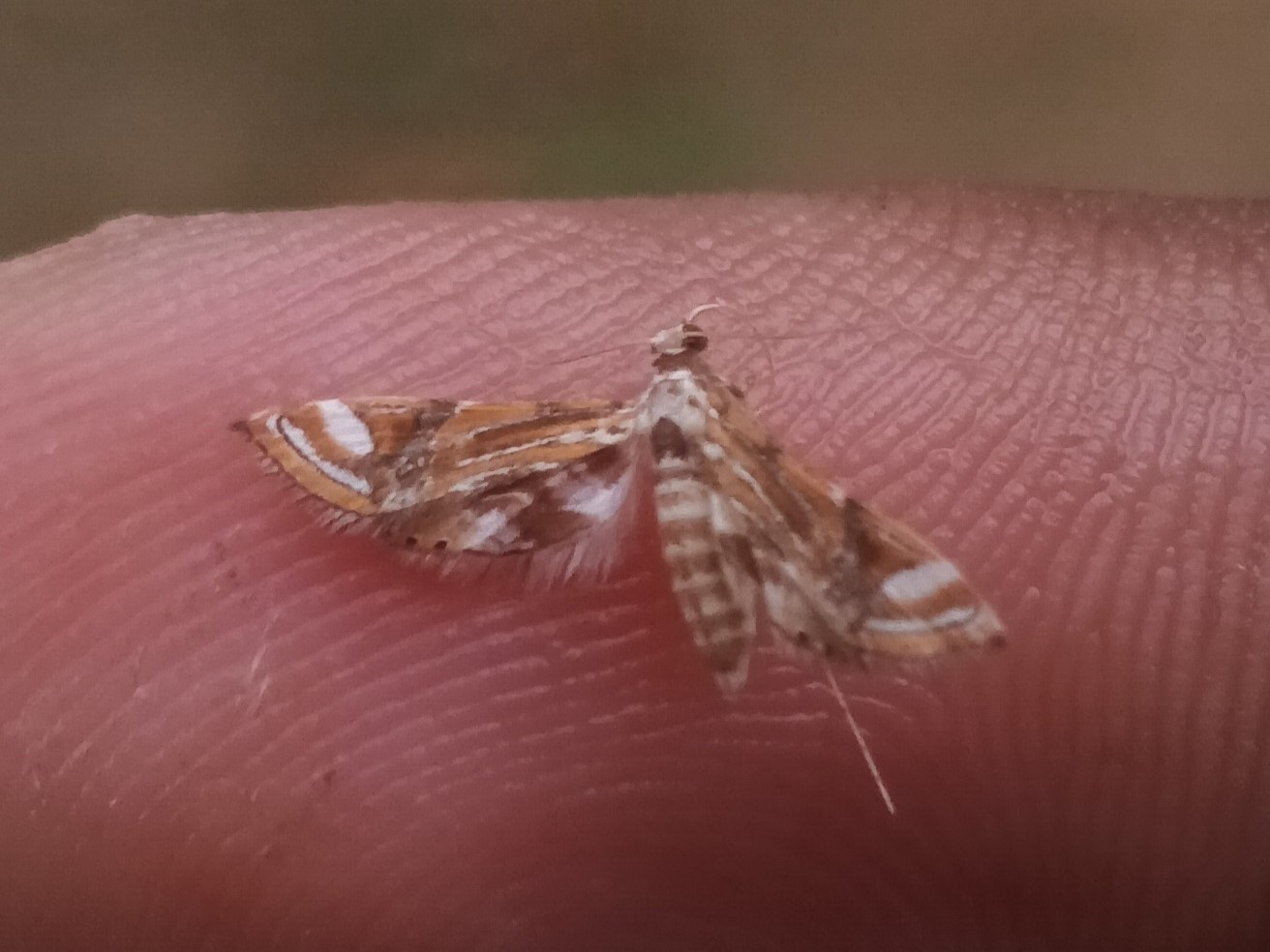

Scientific classification
- Kingdom: Animalia
- Phylum: Arthropoda
- Class: Insecta
- Order: Lepidoptera
- Family: Crambidae
- Subfamily: Acentropinae
- Genus: Eristena
- Species: E. pulchellale

Binomial name
- Eristena pulchellale (Hampson, 1893)

Synonyms
- Oligostigma pulchellale Hampson, 1893

= Eristena pulchellale =

Species of moth

Eristena pulchellale is a species of moth in the family Crambidae. It was described by George Hampson in 1893. It is found in Sri Lanka.
