= Parapoynx restingalis =

Scientific classification
- Kingdom: Animalia
- Phylum: Arthropoda
- Clade: Pancrustacea
- Class: Insecta
- Order: Lepidoptera
- Family: Crambidae
- Genus: Parapoynx
- Species: P. restingalis

Binomial name
- Parapoynx restingalis Da Silva & Nessimian, 1990

Species of moth

Parapoynx restingalis is a moth in the family Crambidae. It is found in Brazil (Rio de Janeiro, Bahia). The habitat consists of marshes with sand dune vegetation (the restinga).

The larvae feed on the floating leaves of Nymphoides humboldtianum and Nymphaea ampla.
