= Agassiziella bambesensis =

Scientific classification
- Kingdom: Animalia
- Phylum: Arthropoda
- Class: Insecta
- Order: Lepidoptera
- Family: Crambidae
- Genus: Agassiziella
- Species: A. bambesensis

Binomial name
- Agassiziella bambesensis (Ghesquière, 1942)

Synonyms
- Oligostigma bambesensis Ghesquière, 1942

Species of moth

Agassiziella bambesensis is a species of moth in the family Crambidae. It is found in the Democratic Republic of Congo.
