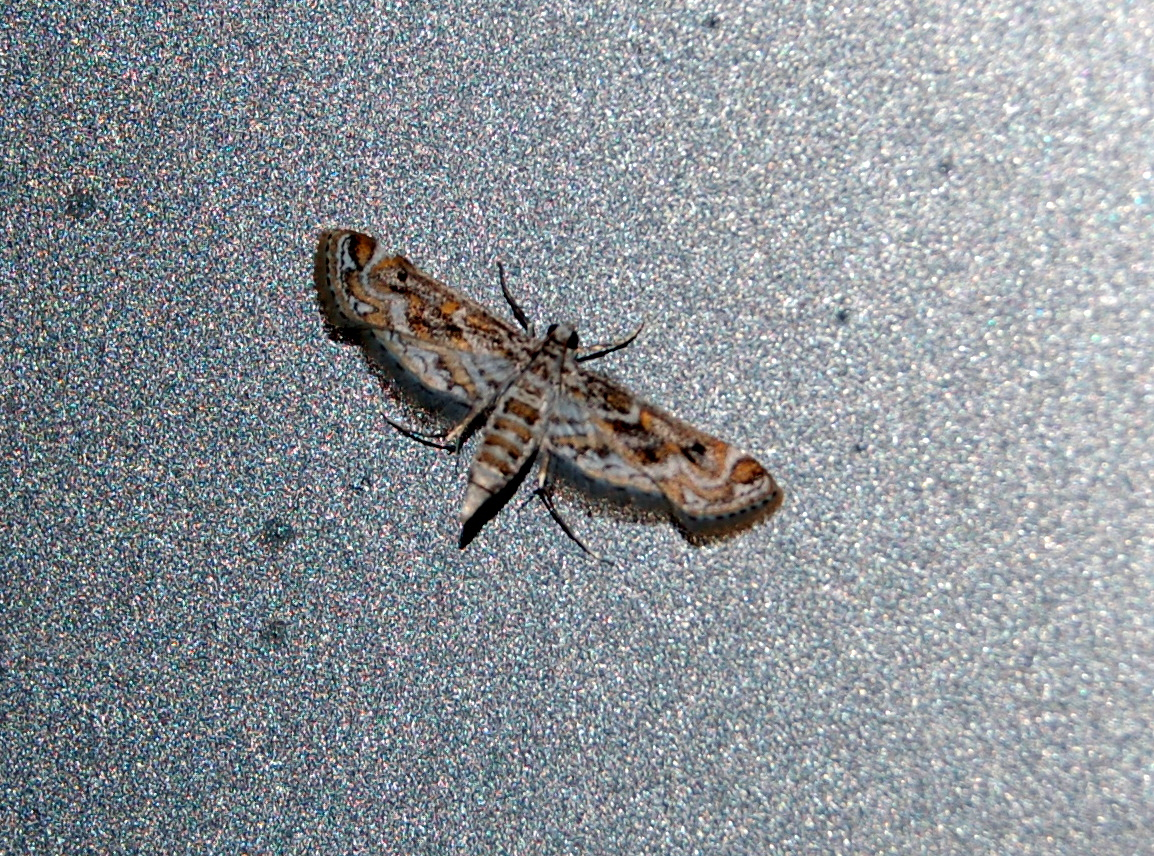

Scientific classification
- Kingdom: Animalia
- Phylum: Arthropoda
- Clade: Pancrustacea
- Class: Insecta
- Order: Lepidoptera
- Family: Crambidae
- Genus: Parapoynx
- Species: P. diminutalis

Binomial name
- Parapoynx diminutalis Snellen, 1880

Synonyms
- Parapoynx dicentra Meyrick, 1885; Oligostigma pallida Butler, 1886; Nymphula uxorialis Strand, 1919

= Parapoynx diminutalis =

Species of moth

Parapoynx diminutalis is a species of moth of the family Crambidae described by Pieter Cornelius Tobias Snellen in 1880. It is endemic to south-east Asia, including the Northern Territory, Queensland and New South Wales in Australia, but has since been found in the United Kingdom and the United States. It is also found in Africa, where it has been recorded from Egypt, Sudan, Ethiopia, Kenya, Uganda, Tanzania, Zambia, Zimbabwe, Malawi, South Africa, Botswana, Angola, the Republic of the Congo, Nigeria and Madagascar.

The wingspan is 11–14 mm for males and 16–23 mm for females.

The larvae feed on Hydrilla and Nymphaea species.
