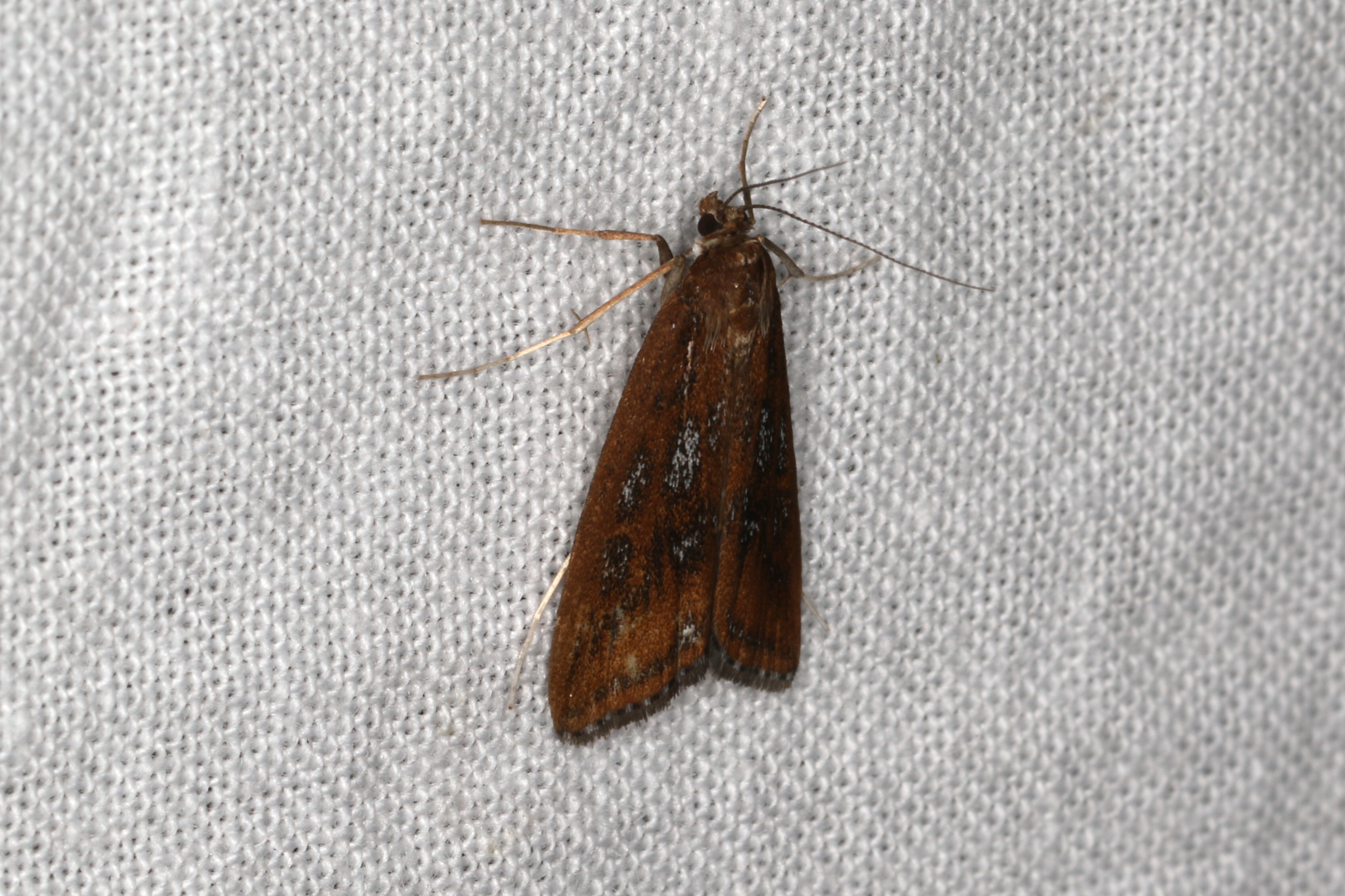
- Merimbula, New South Wales, Australia

Scientific classification
- Kingdom: Animalia
- Phylum: Arthropoda
- Clade: Pancrustacea
- Class: Insecta
- Order: Lepidoptera
- Family: Crambidae
- Genus: Parapoynx
- Species: P. tullialis

Binomial name
- Parapoynx tullialis (Walker, 1859)

Synonyms
- Hydrocampa tullialis Walker, 1859

= Parapoynx tullialis =

Species of moth

Parapoynx tullialis is a moth in the family Crambidae. It was described by Francis Walker in 1859. It is found in Australia, where it has been recorded from the Australian Capital Territory.
