= Parapoynx qujingalis =

Scientific classification
- Kingdom: Animalia
- Phylum: Arthropoda
- Clade: Pancrustacea
- Class: Insecta
- Order: Lepidoptera
- Family: Crambidae
- Genus: Parapoynx
- Species: P. qujingalis

Binomial name
- Parapoynx qujingalis Chen, Song & Wu, 2006

Species of moth

Parapoynx qujingalis is a moth in the family Crambidae. It was described by Fu-Qiang Chen, Shi-Mei Song and Chun-Sheng Wu in 2006. It is found in Yunnan, China.
