= Oligostigma metazonalis =

Scientific classification
- Kingdom: Animalia
- Phylum: Arthropoda
- Class: Insecta
- Order: Lepidoptera
- Family: Crambidae
- Genus: Oligostigma
- Species: O. metazonalis

Binomial name
- Oligostigma metazonalis (Hampson, 1906)

Synonyms
- Argyractis metazonalis Hampson, 1906

Species of moth

Oligostigma metazonalis is a moth in the family Crambidae. It was described by George Hampson in 1906. It is found in São Paulo, Brazil.
