= Agassiziella albidivisa =

Scientific classification
- Kingdom: Animalia
- Phylum: Arthropoda
- Clade: Pancrustacea
- Class: Insecta
- Order: Lepidoptera
- Family: Crambidae
- Genus: Agassiziella
- Species: A. albidivisa

Binomial name
- Agassiziella albidivisa (Warren, 1896)

Synonyms
- Oligostigma albidivisa Warren, 1896

Species of moth

Agassiziella albidivisa is a species of moth in the family Crambidae. It is found in India (the Khasi Hills).
