= Parapoynx panpenealis =

Scientific classification
- Kingdom: Animalia
- Phylum: Arthropoda
- Clade: Pancrustacea
- Class: Insecta
- Order: Lepidoptera
- Family: Crambidae
- Genus: Parapoynx
- Species: P. panpenealis

Binomial name
- Parapoynx panpenealis (Dyar, 1924)

Synonyms
- Nymphula panpenealis Dyar, 1924

Species of moth

Parapoynx panpenealis is a moth in the family Crambidae. It was described by Harrison Gray Dyar Jr. in 1924. It is found in Mexico.
