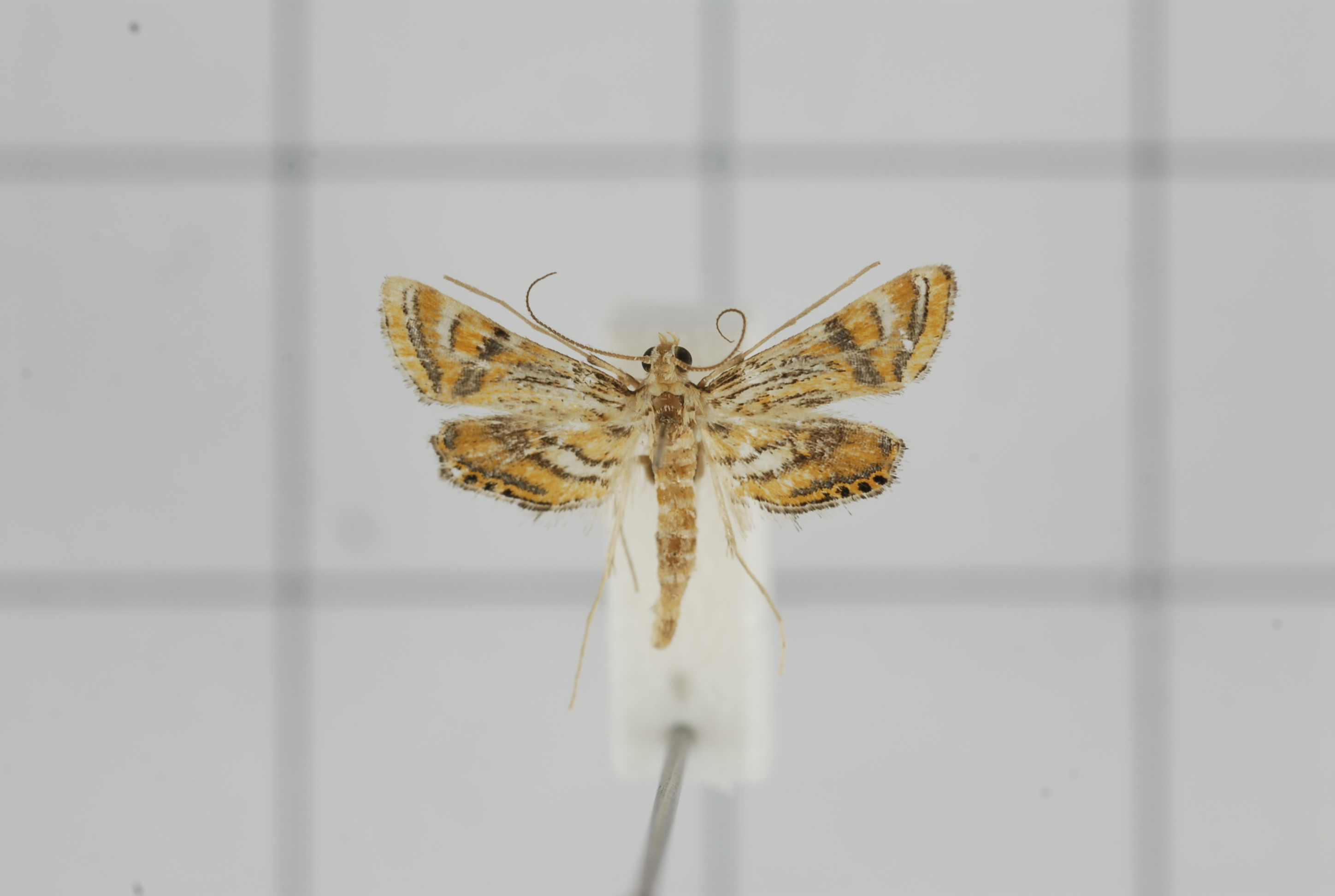

Scientific classification
- Kingdom: Animalia
- Phylum: Arthropoda
- Clade: Pancrustacea
- Class: Insecta
- Order: Lepidoptera
- Family: Crambidae
- Subfamily: Acentropinae
- Genus: Eristena; Warren, 1896

= Eristena =

Genus of moths

Eristena is a genus of moths of the family Crambidae, found in southern and eastern Asia.

== Species ==
- bifurcalis species group
  - Eristena bifurcalis (Pryer, 1877)
  - Eristena curvula F.Q. Chen, S.M. Song & C.S. Wu, 2006
  - Eristena longibursa F.Q. Chen, S.M. Song & C.S. Wu, 2006
  - Eristena lunaris You, Li & Wang, 2003
  - Eristena medexpansa You, Li & Wang in You, Li & Wang, 2003
  - Eristena minutale (Caradja, 1932)
  - Eristena szechuanalis (Caradja, 1934)
- fulva species group
  - Eristena brevisigna F.Q. Chen, S.M. Song & C.S. Wu, 2006
  - Eristena fulva Yoshiyasu, 1987
  - Eristena mesilauensis Mey, 2009
  - Eristena monika Mey, 2009
  - Eristena pulchellale (Hampson, 1893)
  - Eristena pumila Yoshiyasu, 1987
  - Eristena tanongchiti Yoshiyasu, 1984
  - Eristena tridentata F.Q. Chen, S.M. Song & C.S. Wu, 2006
- unknown species group
  - Eristena albifurcalis (Hampson, 1906)
  - Eristena araealis (Hampson, 1897)
  - Eristena argentata Yoshiyasu, 1988
  - Eristena auropunctalis (Hampson, 1903)
  - Eristena camptoteles (Hampson, 1906)
  - Eristena chrysozonalis (Hampson, 1912)
  - Eristena endosaris (Meyrick, 1894)
  - Eristena excisalis (Snellen, 1901)
  - Eristena fumibasale (Hampson, 1896)
  - Eristena gregaria Yoshiyasu, 1984
  - Eristena grisealis Rothschild, 1915
  - Eristena mangalis Murphy, 1989
  - Eristena melanotalis (Hampson, 1906)
  - Eristena murinalis Warren, 1896
  - Eristena oligostigmalis Hampson, 1906
  - Eristena ornata (Moore, 1885)
  - Eristena orthoteles (Meyrick, 1894)
  - Eristena parvalis (Moore, 1877)
  - Eristena postalbalis (Hampson, 1893)
  - Eristena shafferi Murphy, 1989
  - Eristena straminealis Hampson, 1903
  - Eristena syagrusalis (Walker, 1859)
  - Eristena thalassalis Murphy, 1989
