= Parapoynx likiangalis =

Scientific classification
- Kingdom: Animalia
- Phylum: Arthropoda
- Clade: Pancrustacea
- Class: Insecta
- Order: Lepidoptera
- Family: Crambidae
- Genus: Parapoynx
- Species: P. likiangalis

Binomial name
- Parapoynx likiangalis (Caradja in Caradja & Meyrick, 1937)

Synonyms
- Ambia likiangalis Caradja in Caradja & Meyrick, 1937

Species of moth

Parapoynx likiangalis is a moth in the family Crambidae. It was described by Aristide Caradja in 1937. It is found in Yunnan, China.
