= Oligostigma ducale =

Scientific classification
- Domain: Eukaryota
- Kingdom: Animalia
- Phylum: Arthropoda
- Class: Insecta
- Order: Lepidoptera
- Family: Crambidae
- Genus: Oligostigma
- Species: O. ducale

Binomial name
- Oligostigma ducale Schaus, 1906

Synonyms
- Oligostigma ducalis

Species of moth

Oligostigma ducale is a moth in the family Crambidae. It was described by Schaus in 1906. It is found in Brazil.
