= Eristena pumila =

Scientific classification
- Kingdom: Animalia
- Phylum: Arthropoda
- Class: Insecta
- Order: Lepidoptera
- Family: Crambidae
- Subfamily: Acentropinae
- Genus: Eristena
- Species: E. pumila

Binomial name
- Eristena pumila Yoshiyasu, 1987

Species of moth

Eristena pumila is a species of moth in the family Crambidae. Yoshiyasu described it in 1987. You can find it in Thailand.
