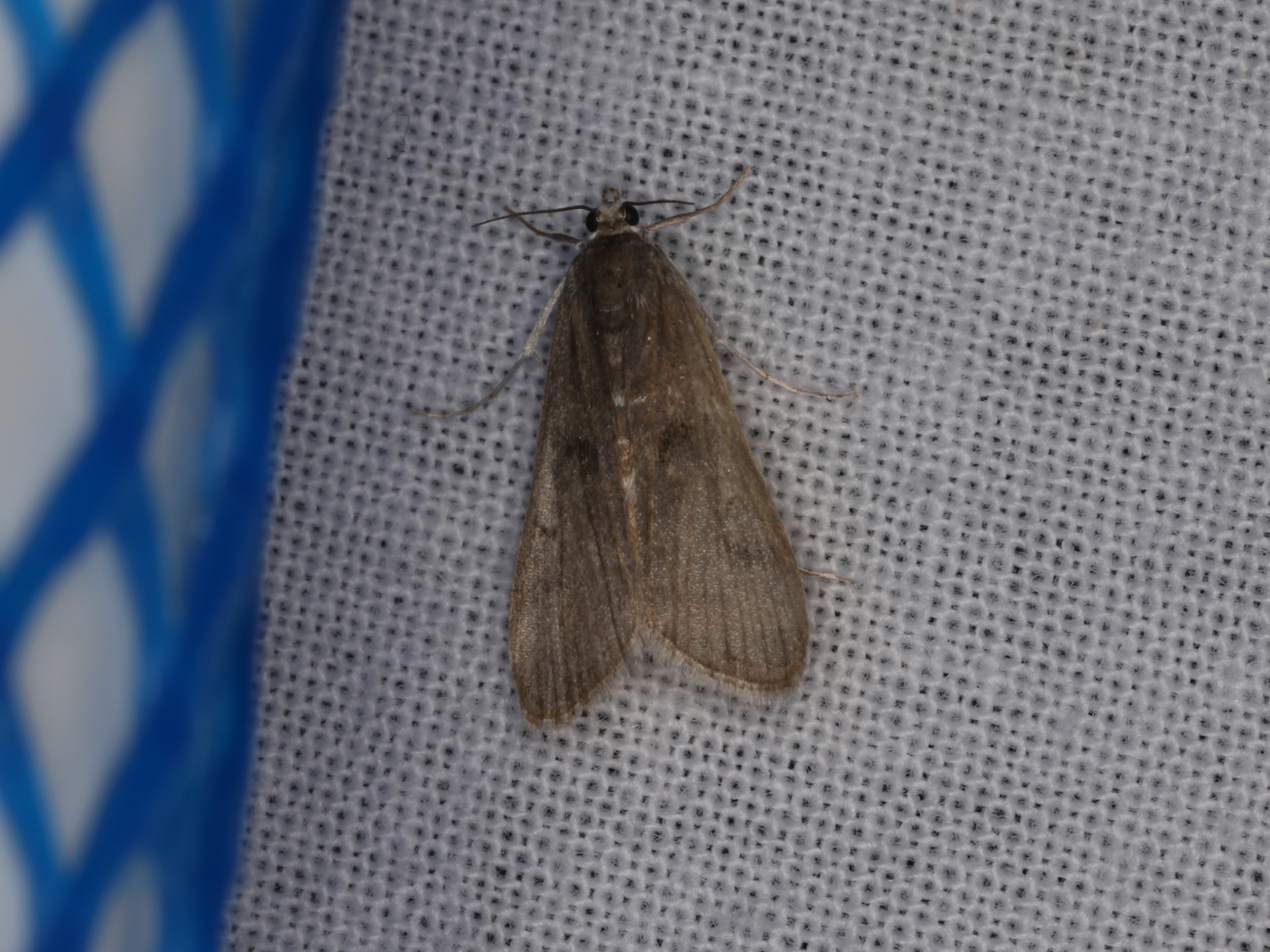

Scientific classification
- Kingdom: Animalia
- Phylum: Arthropoda
- Clade: Pancrustacea
- Class: Insecta
- Order: Lepidoptera
- Family: Crambidae
- Genus: Parapoynx
- Species: P. maculalis

Binomial name
- Parapoynx maculalis (Clemens, 1860)

Synonyms
- Sironia maculalis Clemens, 1860; Nymphula maculalis; Nymphaeella dispar Grote, 1880; Nymphula maculalis ab. foeminalis Dyar, 1906; Nymphula maculalis ab. masculinalis Dyar, 1906; Nephopteryx seminivella Walker, 1866

= Parapoynx maculalis =

Species of moth

Parapoynx maculalis, the polymorphic pondweed moth, is a moth in the family Crambidae. It was described by James Brackenridge Clemens in 1860. It is found in eastern North America, where it has been recorded from Alabama, Alberta, Florida, Georgia, Illinois, Indiana, Louisiana, Maine, Maryland, Massachusetts, Michigan, Minnesota, Mississippi, New Brunswick, New Hampshire, New Jersey, Newfoundland, North Carolina, North Dakota, Nova Scotia, Ontario, Pennsylvania, Quebec, South Carolina, Tennessee, Texas and Wisconsin. The habitat consists of ponds and streams.

The wingspan is 18–22 mm. The forewings are white, dusted with fuscous along the base and with a fuscous spot at the base of the fold. The hindwings are pure white.

The larvae feed on various aquatic plants. Young larvae are light yellowish brown with a dark yellowish-brown head.
