= Oligostigma odrianale =

Scientific classification
- Domain: Eukaryota
- Kingdom: Animalia
- Phylum: Arthropoda
- Class: Insecta
- Order: Lepidoptera
- Family: Crambidae
- Genus: Oligostigma
- Species: O. odrianale

Binomial name
- Oligostigma odrianale Schaus, 1924

Species of moth

Oligostigma odrianale is a moth in the family Crambidae. It was described by Schaus in 1924. It is found in Brazil (São Paulo).
