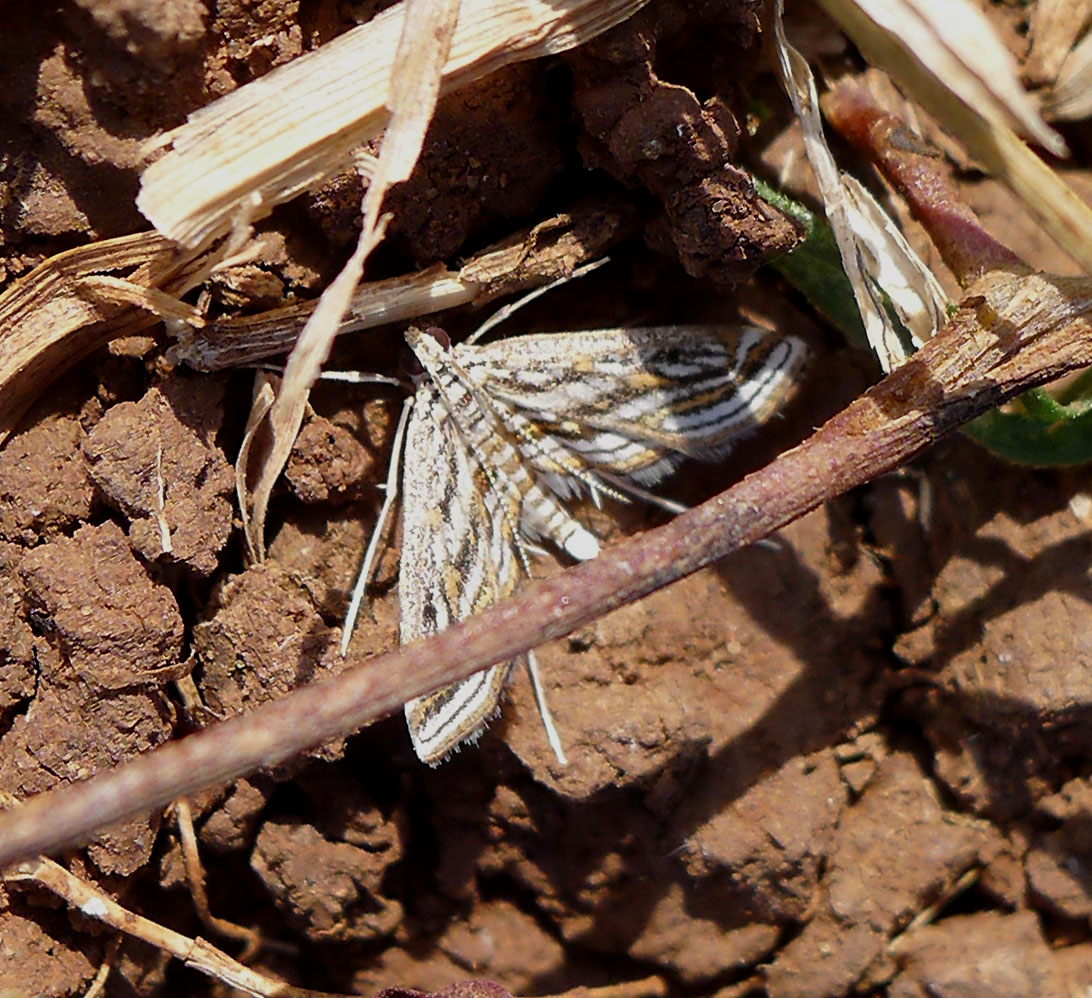

Scientific classification
- Kingdom: Animalia
- Phylum: Arthropoda
- Clade: Pancrustacea
- Class: Insecta
- Order: Lepidoptera
- Family: Crambidae
- Genus: Parapoynx
- Species: P. fluctuosalis

Binomial name
- Parapoynx fluctuosalis (Meyrick, 1899)

Synonyms
- Nymphula fluctuosalis Zeller, 1852; Paraponyx fluctuosalis; Parapoynx linealis Guenée, 1854; Oligostigma curta Butler, 1879; Oligostigma chrysippusalis Walker, 1859; Oligostigma obitalis Walker, 1859; Nymphula luteivittalis Mabille, 1880; Paraponyx cryzalis Wood-Mason, 1885; Paraponyx oryzalis Wood-Mason, 1885; Paraponyx rugosalis Möschler, 1890; Nymphula circealis Walker, 1859

= Parapoynx fluctuosalis =

Species of moth

Parapoynx fluctuosalis or Fluctuating China-mark or Waved China-mark, is a moth of the family Crambidae. It is a widespread species, known from Africa, India, Sri Lanka, China, Japan, Malaysia, Taiwan, Guam, Hawaii, Fiji, Australia and the Galápagos Islands. It is also an introduced species in Europe, where it has been recorded from Great Britain, the Iberian Peninsula and Sardinia.

Adults are sexually dimorphic, with a variable colouration of the wings.

== Subspecies ==
- Parapoynx fluctuosalis fluctuosalis (Africa)
- Parapoynx fluctuosalis linealis Guenée, 1854 (Asia)
