= Parapoynx medusalis =

Scientific classification
- Kingdom: Animalia
- Phylum: Arthropoda
- Clade: Pancrustacea
- Class: Insecta
- Order: Lepidoptera
- Family: Crambidae
- Genus: Parapoynx
- Species: P. medusalis

Binomial name
- Parapoynx medusalis (Walker, 1859)

Synonyms
- Zebronia medusalis Walker, 1859; Paraponyx dianalis Schaus, 1906

Species of moth

Parapoynx medusalis is a moth in the family Crambidae. It was described by Francis Walker in 1859. It is found in São Paulo, Brazil and in Australia, where it has been recorded from Queensland.
