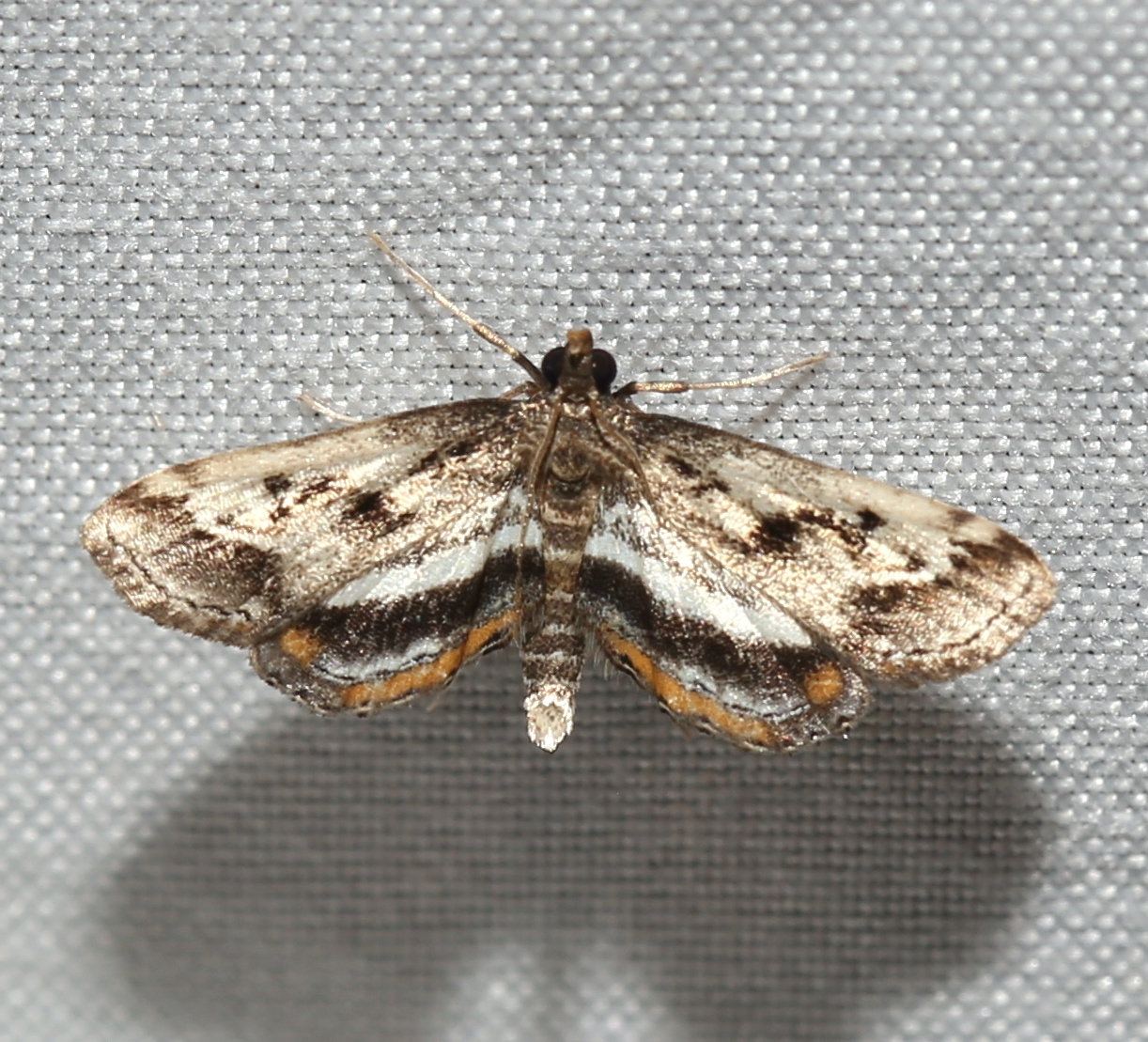

Scientific classification
- Kingdom: Animalia
- Phylum: Arthropoda
- Clade: Pancrustacea
- Class: Insecta
- Order: Lepidoptera
- Family: Crambidae
- Genus: Parapoynx
- Species: P. obscuralis

Binomial name
- Parapoynx obscuralis (Grote, 1881)

Synonyms
- Oligostigma obscuralis Grote, 1881

= Parapoynx obscuralis =

Species of moth

Parapoynx obscuralis, the obscure pondweed moth, American china-mark or vallisneria leafcutter, is a moth in the family Crambidae. It was described by Augustus Radcliffe Grote in 1881. It is found in North America, where it has been recorded from Nova Scotia to Florida, west to Texas and north to Wisconsin and Ontario. It is also found in Great Britain, where it is naturalised in aquatic nurseries through accidental introduction.

The larvae are aquatic and feed on various aquatic plants, including Vallisneria, Potamogeton and Nuphar species.
