= Parapoynx epimochla =

Scientific classification
- Kingdom: Animalia
- Phylum: Arthropoda
- Clade: Pancrustacea
- Class: Insecta
- Order: Lepidoptera
- Family: Crambidae
- Genus: Parapoynx
- Species: P. epimochla

Binomial name
- Parapoynx epimochla (Turner, 1908)

Synonyms
- Nymphula epimochla Turner, 1908

Species of moth

Parapoynx epimochla is a moth in the family Crambidae. It was described by Turner in 1908. It is found in Australia, where it has been recorded from New South Wales.

The wingspan is about 18 mm. The forewings pale ochreous-fuscous, mixed with whitish. There is a fine white subterminal line. The hindwings are white with a narrow median and broad postmedian fuscous fascia, as well as an ochreous-fuscous terminal fascia edged anteriorly with fuscous.

== Etymology ==
The species name is derived from epimochlos (meaning marked with a bar).
