= Agassiziella irisalis =

Scientific classification
- Kingdom: Animalia
- Phylum: Arthropoda
- Class: Insecta
- Order: Lepidoptera
- Family: Crambidae
- Genus: Agassiziella
- Species: A. irisalis

Binomial name
- Agassiziella irisalis (Walker, 1859)

Synonyms
- Cataclysta irisalis Walker, 1859; Oligostigma irisale Hampson, 1897

Species of moth

Agassiziella irisalis is a species of moth in the family Crambidae. It is found in the Democratic Republic of Congo and Sierra Leone.
