= Eristena curvula =

Scientific classification
- Kingdom: Animalia
- Phylum: Arthropoda
- Clade: Pancrustacea
- Class: Insecta
- Order: Lepidoptera
- Family: Crambidae
- Subfamily: Acentropinae
- Genus: Eristena
- Species: E. curvula

Binomial name
- Eristena curvula F.Q. Chen, S.M. Song & C.S. Wu, 2006

Species of moth

Eristena curvula is a species of moth in the family Crambidae. It was described by Fu-Qiang Chen, Shi-Mei Song and Chun-Sheng Wu in 2006. It is found in Jiangxi, China.
