= Parapoynx dentizonalis =

Scientific classification
- Kingdom: Animalia
- Phylum: Arthropoda
- Clade: Pancrustacea
- Class: Insecta
- Order: Lepidoptera
- Family: Crambidae
- Genus: Parapoynx
- Species: P. dentizonalis

Binomial name
- Parapoynx dentizonalis (Hampson, 1897)

Synonyms
- Nymphula dentizonalis Hampson, 1897

Species of moth

Parapoynx dentizonalis is a moth in the family Crambidae. It was described by George Hampson in 1897. It is found in Australia, where it has been recorded from Queensland.
