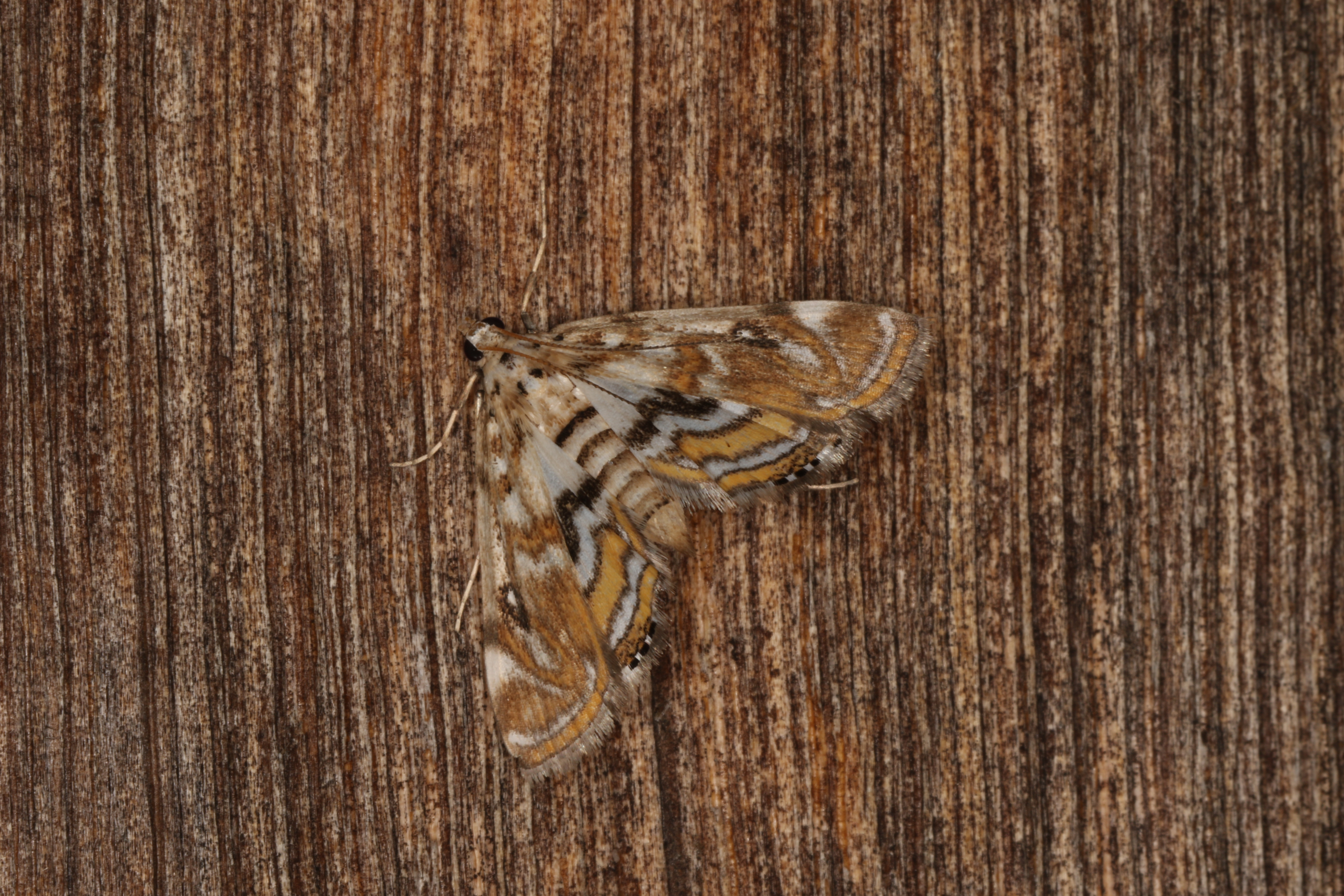
- Parapoynx polydectalis (Walker, 1859), Merimbula, NSW, to Heath trap, 8/9 December 2015

Scientific classification
- Kingdom: Animalia
- Phylum: Arthropoda
- Clade: Pancrustacea
- Class: Insecta
- Order: Lepidoptera
- Family: Crambidae
- Genus: Parapoynx
- Species: P. polydectalis

Binomial name
- Parapoynx polydectalis (Walker, 1859)

Synonyms
- Cataclysta polydectalis Walker, 1859; Oligostigma polydectalis; Parapoynx unguicalis Snellen, 1880

= Parapoynx polydectalis =

Species of moth

Parapoynx polydectalis is a moth in the family Crambidae. It was described by Francis Walker in 1859. It is found in Indonesia (including Sumatra), New Guinea and Australia, where it has been recorded from Queensland, northern Western Australia, the Northern Territory, New South Wales and Victoria. It is an introduced species in Great Britain and France.

The wingspan is about 20 mm. There is a pattern of brown and white on the wings.

The larvae are aquatic, feeding on water weeds.
