= Oligostigma ectogonalis =

Scientific classification
- Kingdom: Animalia
- Phylum: Arthropoda
- Class: Insecta
- Order: Lepidoptera
- Family: Crambidae
- Genus: Oligostigma
- Species: O. ectogonalis

Binomial name
- Oligostigma ectogonalis Hampson, 1906

Species of moth

Oligostigma ectogonalis is a moth in the family Crambidae. It was described by George Hampson in 1906. It is found on the Louisiade Archipelago of Papua New Guinea.
