= Eristena syagrusalis =

Scientific classification
- Kingdom: Animalia
- Phylum: Arthropoda
- Class: Insecta
- Order: Lepidoptera
- Family: Crambidae
- Subfamily: Acentropinae
- Genus: Eristena
- Species: E. syagrusalis

Binomial name
- Eristena syagrusalis (Walker, 1859)

Synonyms
- Cataclysta syagrusalis Walker, 1859; Oligostigma melanodes Meyrick, 1894

Species of moth

Eristena syagrusalis is a species of moth in the family Crambidae. It was described by Francis Walker in 1859. It is found on Borneo.
