= Parapoynx effrenatalis =

Scientific classification
- Kingdom: Animalia
- Phylum: Arthropoda
- Clade: Pancrustacea
- Class: Insecta
- Order: Lepidoptera
- Family: Crambidae
- Genus: Parapoynx
- Species: P. effrenatalis

Binomial name
- Parapoynx effrenatalis Berg, 1876

Synonyms
- Nymphula effrenatalis

Species of moth

Parapoynx effrenatalis is a moth in the family Crambidae. It was described by Carlos Berg in 1876 and is found in Uruguay.
