= Eristena excisalis =

Scientific classification
- Kingdom: Animalia
- Phylum: Arthropoda
- Class: Insecta
- Order: Lepidoptera
- Family: Crambidae
- Subfamily: Acentropinae
- Genus: Eristena
- Species: E. excisalis

Binomial name
- Eristena excisalis (Snellen, 1901)

Synonyms
- Oligostigma excisalis Snellen, 1901; Oligostigma auropunctalis var. javanica Strand, 1914

Species of moth

Eristena excisalis is a species of moth in the family Crambidae. It was described by Snellen in 1901. It is found on Java.
