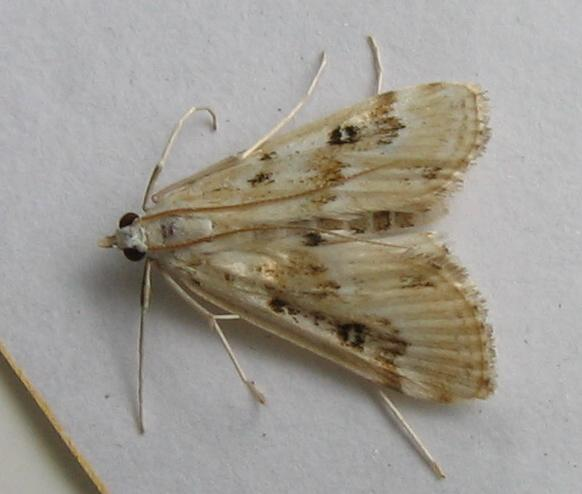
- Male

Scientific classification
- Kingdom: Animalia
- Phylum: Arthropoda
- Clade: Pancrustacea
- Class: Insecta
- Order: Lepidoptera
- Family: Crambidae
- Genus: Parapoynx
- Species: P. stratiotata

Binomial name
- Parapoynx stratiotata (Linnaeus, 1758)

Synonyms
- Phalaena (Geometra) stratiotata Linnaeus, 1758; Nymphula stratiotata ab. fasciata Teich, 1908; Nymphula stratiotata ab. nigrata Krulikovsky, 1909; Nymphula stratiotata amanica Osthelder, 1935; Nymphula stratiotata uralica Caradja in Caradja & Meyrick, 1937; Phalaena paludata Fabricius, 1794; Phalaena stratiotes Retzius, 1783; Scopula paludalis Schrank, 1802; Phalaena stratiolata Fourcroy, 1787; Phalaena stratiolatis Haworth, 1802; Phalaena strationata Ganev, 1982; Phalaena Pyralis stratiotalis Denis & Schiffermüller, 1775; Parapoynx maroccanum Speidel, 1982

= Parapoynx stratiotata =

Species of moth

Parapoynx stratiotata, the ringed china-mark, is a moth of the family Crambidae. The species was first described by Carl Linnaeus in his 1758 10th edition of Systema Naturae. It is found in Europe where the distribution area extends in the north to the British Isles including Ireland and in the south to Sardinia, Sicily and Greece. The species is also found across the Palearctic in North Africa, Lebanon, Turkey, Azerbaijan, Kyrgyzstan, Uzbekistan and China..

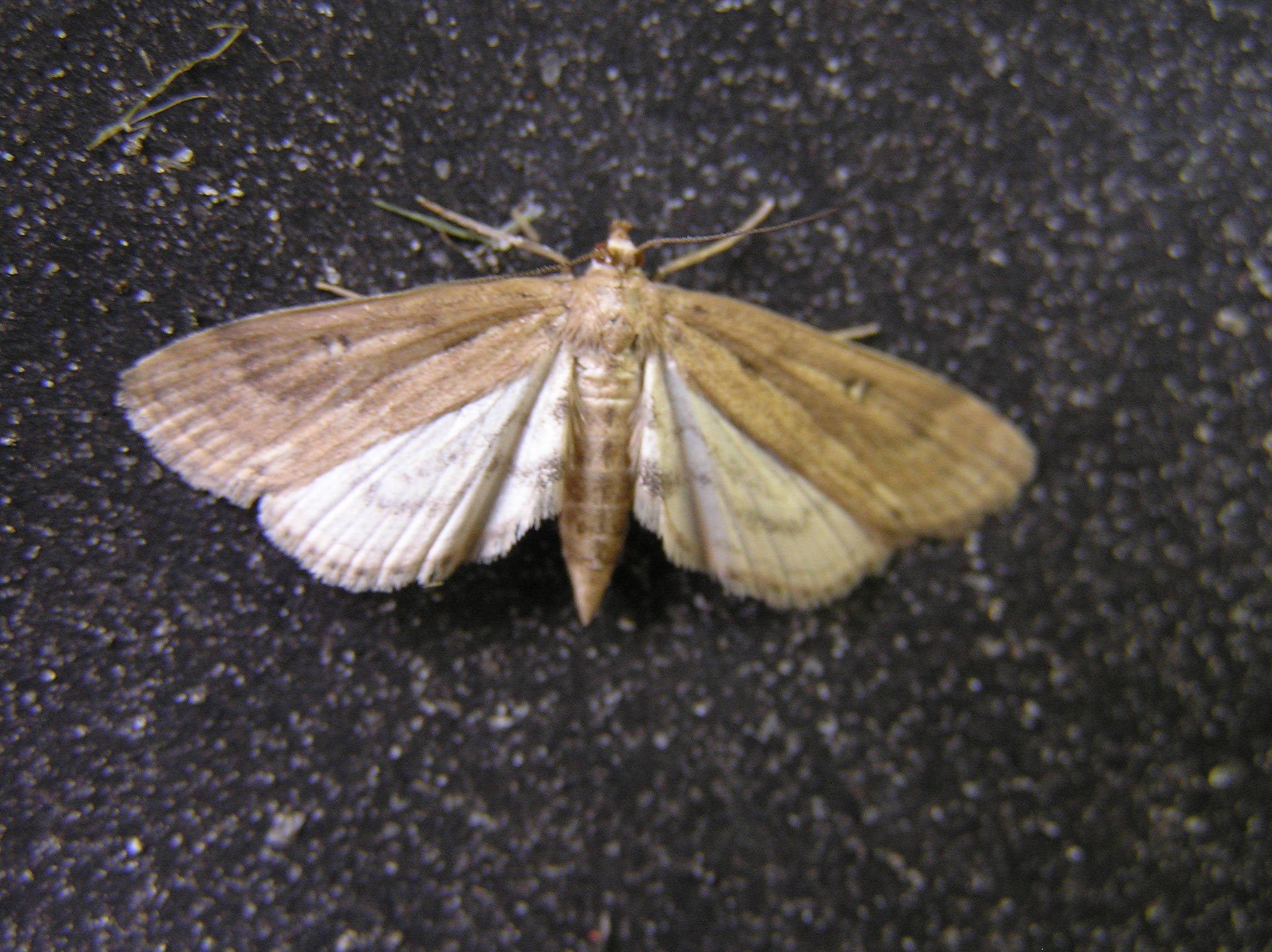
Female

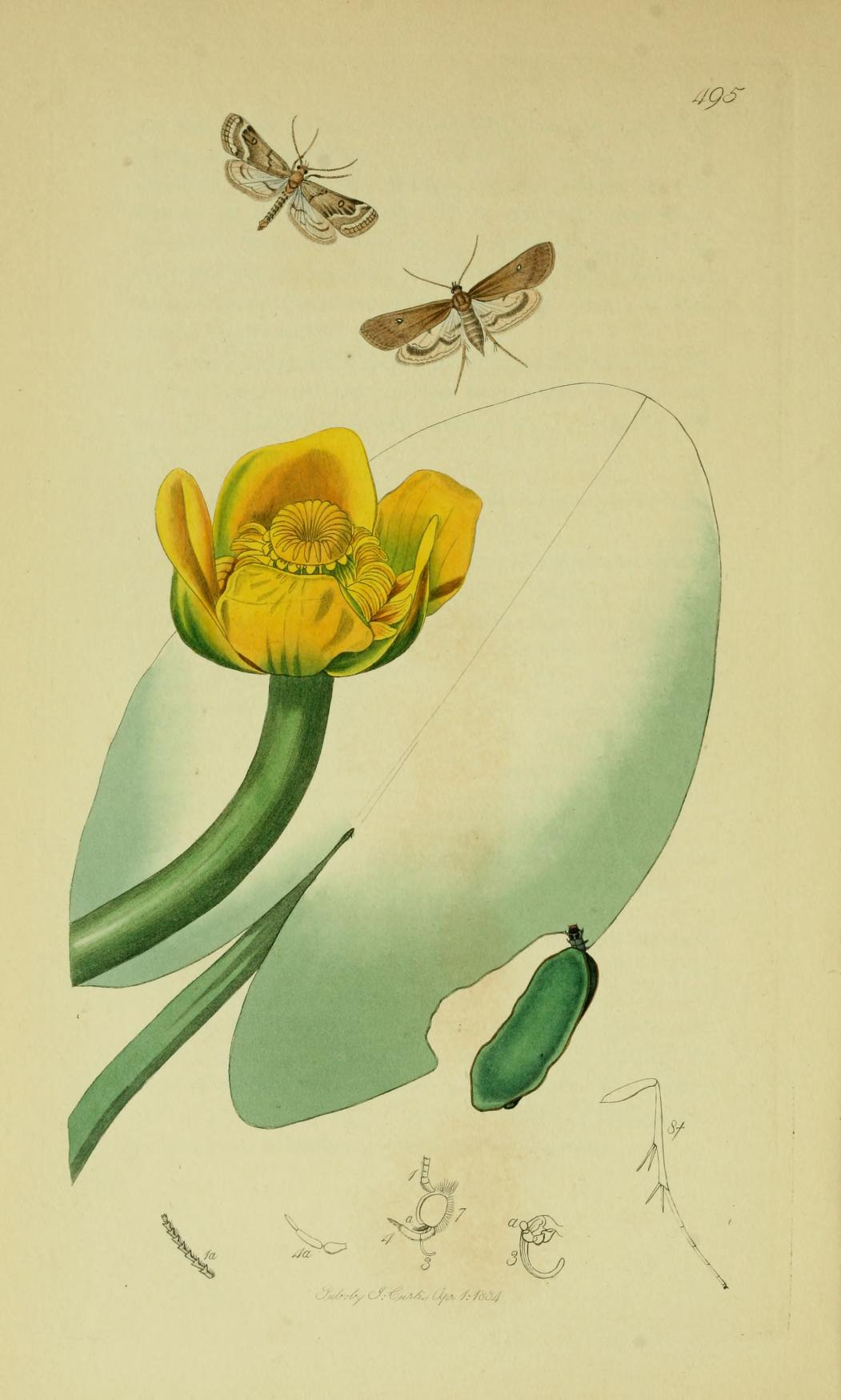
Illustration from John Curtis's British Entomology Volume 6

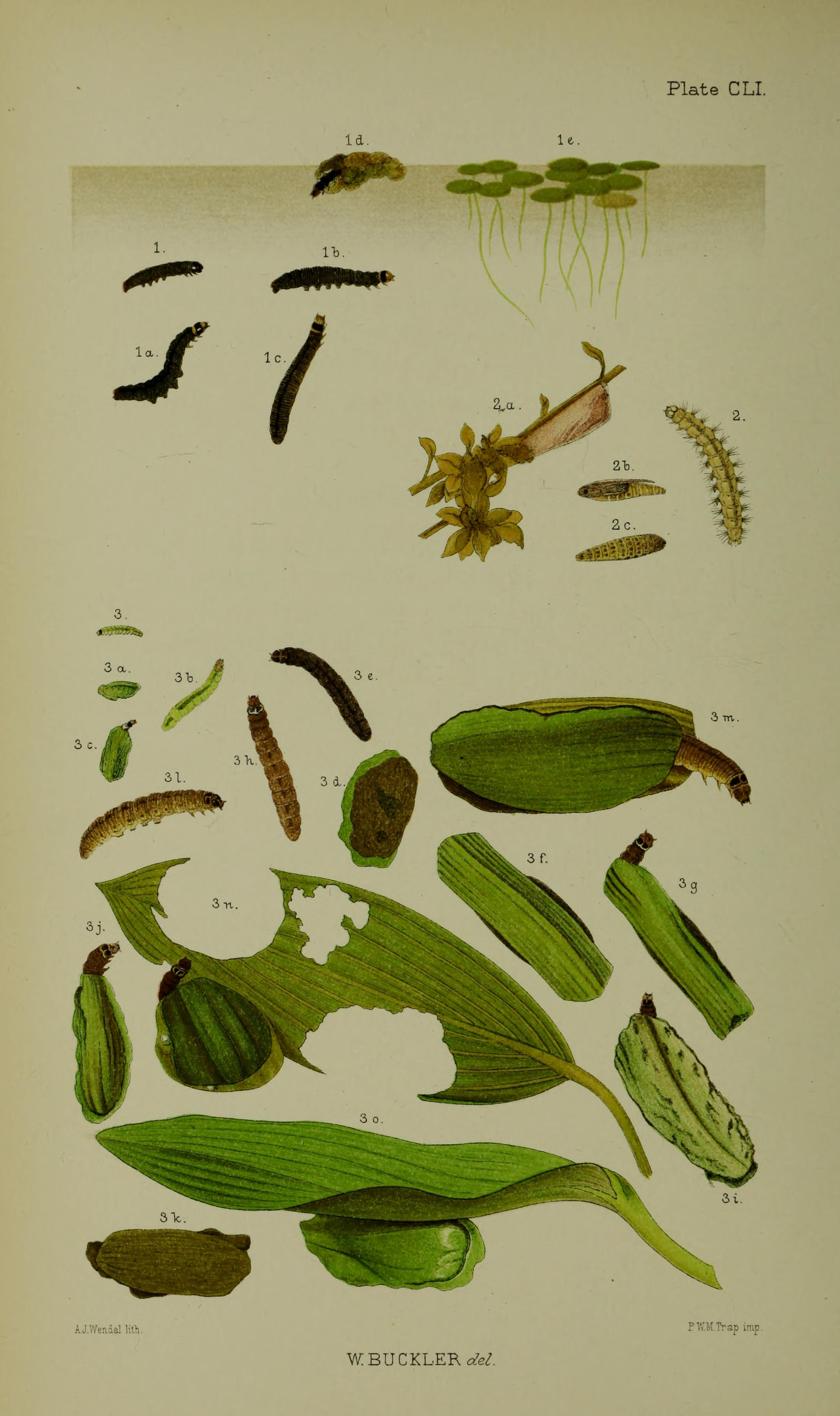
Figs 2 larva after final moult 2a cocoon on Anacharis alsinastrum 2b 2c dorsal and ventral aspects of pupa from William BucklerThe Larvae of the British Butterflies and Moths

The wingspan is 20–24 mm for the males and 28–30 mm for the females. The forewings are pale ochreous brownish, sometimes partly suffused with white in disc; lines white, first indistinct, posteriorly partly edged with dark brown, second sinuate, anteriorly suffusedly edged with dark brown; a white discal spot, edged with dark fuscous; a white subterminal streak. Hindwings are white; a thick dark fuscous postmedian line; a fine dark subterminal line; termen yellow-tinged. The larva with eight series of groups of fleshy filaments, serving as branchiae; whitish-ochreous or pale greenish, slightly purplish freckled; dorsal line rather dark grey; head pale brown.

The moth flies from May to September depending on the location.

The larvae feed on Nymphaea alba, Potamogeton, Callitriche, Ceratophyllum demersum, Elodea canadensis, Nuphar lutea and Stratiotes.

== Subspecies ==
- Parapoynx stratiotata stratiotata
- Parapoynx stratiotata maroccanum Speidel, 1982 (Morocco)
