= Oligostigma flavialbalis =

Scientific classification
- Kingdom: Animalia
- Phylum: Arthropoda
- Class: Insecta
- Order: Lepidoptera
- Family: Crambidae
- Genus: Oligostigma
- Species: O. flavialbalis

Binomial name
- Oligostigma flavialbalis Hampson, 1917

Species of moth

Oligostigma flavialbalis is a moth in the family Crambidae. It was described by George Hampson in 1917. It is found on Madagascar.
