= Eristena gregaria =

Scientific classification
- Kingdom: Animalia
- Phylum: Arthropoda
- Class: Insecta
- Order: Lepidoptera
- Family: Crambidae
- Subfamily: Acentropinae
- Genus: Eristena
- Species: E. gregaria

Binomial name
- Eristena gregaria Yoshiyasu, 1984

Species of moth

Eristena gregaria is a species of moth in the family Crambidae. It was described by Yoshiyasu in 1984. It is found in Thailand.
