= Parapoynx zambiensis =

Scientific classification
- Kingdom: Animalia
- Phylum: Arthropoda
- Clade: Pancrustacea
- Class: Insecta
- Order: Lepidoptera
- Family: Crambidae
- Genus: Parapoynx
- Species: P. zambiensis

Binomial name
- Parapoynx zambiensis Agassiz, 2012

Species of moth

Parapoynx zambiensis is a moth in the family Crambidae. It was described by David John Lawrence Agassiz in 2012. It is found in the Democratic Republic of the Congo, Botswana and Zambia.

The wingspan is 15–18 mm. Adults have been recorded on wing in January and December.

== Etymology ==
The species name refers to Zambia, where most specimens originate.
