= Parapoynx moriutii =

Scientific classification
- Kingdom: Animalia
- Phylum: Arthropoda
- Clade: Pancrustacea
- Class: Insecta
- Order: Lepidoptera
- Family: Crambidae
- Genus: Parapoynx
- Species: P. moriutii

Binomial name
- Parapoynx moriutii Yoshiyasu, 2005

Species of moth

Parapoynx moriutii is a moth in the family Crambidae. It was described by Yoshiyasu in 2005. It is found in Japan.
