= Parapoynx plumbefusalis =

Scientific classification
- Kingdom: Animalia
- Phylum: Arthropoda
- Clade: Pancrustacea
- Class: Insecta
- Order: Lepidoptera
- Family: Crambidae
- Genus: Parapoynx
- Species: P. plumbefusalis

Binomial name
- Parapoynx plumbefusalis (Hampson, 1917)

Synonyms
- Nymphula plumbefusalis Hampson, 1917; Parapoynx plumbefusalis Viette, 1990

Species of moth

Parapoynx plumbefusalis is a moth in the family Crambidae. It was described by George Hampson in 1917. It is found in Sudan, Uganda, Kenya, Tanzania, Zambia, Zimbabwe, Cameroon, Senegal, Nigeria, Niger, Sierra Leone, Angola, Botswana, Kenya and Madagascar.

The wingspan is 14–17 mm for males and 18–23 mm for females. Adults have been recorded on wing in February and from July to October.

The larvae feed on Nymphoides indica.
