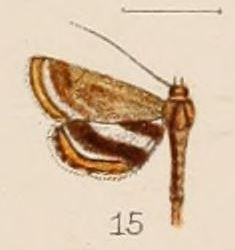
- Agassiziella alicialis

Scientific classification
- Kingdom: Animalia
- Phylum: Arthropoda
- Clade: Pancrustacea
- Class: Insecta
- Order: Lepidoptera
- Family: Crambidae
- Subfamily: Acentropinae
- Genus: Agassiziella; Yoshiyasu, 1989

Synonyms
- Agassizia Yoshiyasu, 1987

= Agassiziella =

Genus of moths

Agassiziella is a genus of moths of the family Crambidae.

== Species ==
- Agassiziella albidivisa (Warren, 1896)
- Agassiziella alicialis (Hampson, 1906)
- Agassiziella angulipennis (Hampson, 1891)
- Agassiziella bambesensis (Ghesquière, 1942)
- Agassiziella dianale (Hampson, 1893)
- Agassiziella fuscifusalis (Hampson, 1893)
- Agassiziella hapilista (Swinhoe, 1892)
- Agassiziella irisalis (Walker, 1859)
- Agassiziella kwangtungiale (Caradja, 1925)
- Agassiziella niveinotatum (Hampson, 1893)
- Agassiziella picalis (Guenée, 1854)
