= Eristena murinalis =

Scientific classification
- Kingdom: Animalia
- Phylum: Arthropoda
- Class: Insecta
- Order: Lepidoptera
- Family: Crambidae
- Subfamily: Acentropinae
- Genus: Eristena
- Species: E. murinalis

Binomial name
- Eristena murinalis Warren, 1896

Species of moth

Eristena murinalis is a species of moth in the family Crambidae. It was described by Warren in 1896. It is found in India.
