= Eristena bifurcalis =

Scientific classification
- Kingdom: Animalia
- Phylum: Arthropoda
- Class: Insecta
- Order: Lepidoptera
- Family: Crambidae
- Subfamily: Acentropinae
- Genus: Eristena
- Species: E. bifurcalis

Binomial name
- Eristena bifurcalis (Pryer, 1877)

Synonyms
- Cataclysta bifurcalis Pryer, 1877

Species of moth

Eristena bifurcalis is a species of moth in the family Crambidae. It was described by Pryer in 1877. It is found in China and Taiwan.
