= Oligostigma chrysota =

Scientific classification
- Domain: Eukaryota
- Kingdom: Animalia
- Phylum: Arthropoda
- Class: Insecta
- Order: Lepidoptera
- Family: Crambidae
- Genus: Oligostigma
- Species: O. chrysota

Binomial name
- Oligostigma chrysota (Meyrick, 1886)

Synonyms
- Paraponyx chrysota Meyrick, 1886; Parapoynx chrysota

Species of moth

Oligostigma chrysota is a moth in the family Crambidae. It was described by Edward Meyrick in 1886. It is found on Fiji.
