= Parapoynx rectilinealis =

Scientific classification
- Kingdom: Animalia
- Phylum: Arthropoda
- Clade: Pancrustacea
- Class: Insecta
- Order: Lepidoptera
- Family: Crambidae
- Genus: Parapoynx
- Species: P. rectilinealis

Binomial name
- Parapoynx rectilinealis Yoshiyasu, 1985

Species of moth

Parapoynx rectilinealis is a moth in the family Crambidae. It was described by Yoshiyasu in 1985. It is found in Japan.
