= Eristena camptoteles =

Scientific classification
- Kingdom: Animalia
- Phylum: Arthropoda
- Class: Insecta
- Order: Lepidoptera
- Family: Crambidae
- Subfamily: Acentropinae
- Genus: Eristena
- Species: E. camptoteles

Binomial name
- Eristena camptoteles (Hampson, 1906)

Synonyms
- Oligostigma camptoteles Hampson, 1906

Species of moth

Eristena camptoteles is a species of moth in the family Crambidae. It was described by George Hampson in 1906. It is found on Sumbawa in Indonesia.
