= Oligostigma rufiterminalis =

Scientific classification
- Kingdom: Animalia
- Phylum: Arthropoda
- Class: Insecta
- Order: Lepidoptera
- Family: Crambidae
- Genus: Oligostigma
- Species: O. rufiterminalis

Binomial name
- Oligostigma rufiterminalis Hampson, 1917

Species of moth

Oligostigma rufiterminalis is a moth in the family Crambidae. It was described by George Hampson in 1917. It is found on Madagascar.
