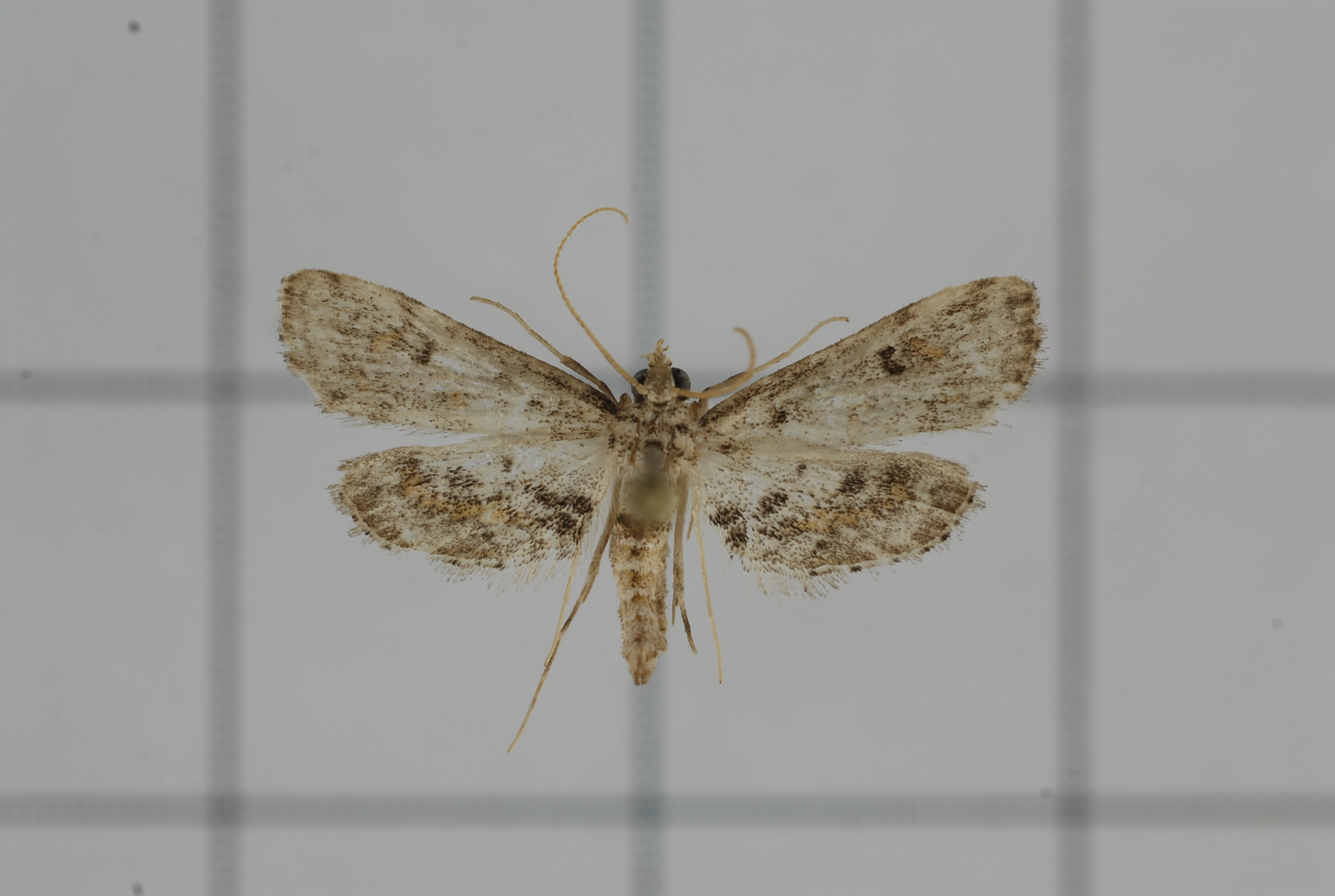

Scientific classification
- Kingdom: Animalia
- Phylum: Arthropoda
- Clade: Pancrustacea
- Class: Insecta
- Order: Lepidoptera
- Family: Crambidae
- Genus: Parapoynx
- Species: P. crisonalis

Binomial name
- Parapoynx crisonalis (Walker, 1859)

Synonyms
- Hydrocampa crisonalis Walker, 1859; Nymphula incurvalis South in Leech & South, 1901; Nymphula takamukui Shibuya, 1929; Paraponyx myina Meyrick, 1885; Parapoynx hebraicalis Snellen, 1880

= Parapoynx crisonalis =

Species of moth

Parapoynx crisonalis is a moth in the family Crambidae. It was described by Francis Walker in 1859. It has a wide range and has been recorded from India, Sri Lanka, Thailand, Indonesia (including Sulawesi), China, Taiwan, Japan and Australia (Queensland). It has been recorded from Great Britain through accidental import with aquatic plants.

The wingspan is 11–15 mm. There is a pattern of various shades of brown and white on the wings. There is a dark spot near the middle of the hindwings.

The larvae are aquatic and feed on various pondweeds.
