= Agassiziella angulipennis =

Scientific classification
- Kingdom: Animalia
- Phylum: Arthropoda
- Clade: Pancrustacea
- Class: Insecta
- Order: Lepidoptera
- Family: Crambidae
- Genus: Agassiziella
- Species: A. angulipennis

Binomial name
- Agassiziella angulipennis (Hampson, 1891)

Synonyms
- Oligostigma angulipennis Hampson, 1891

Species of moth

Agassiziella angulipennis is a species of moth in the family Crambidae. It is found in India, where it was described from the Nilgiri district, as well as in Sri Lanka and Thailand. It has accidentally been introduced to the United Kingdom where it has become naturalised, living in aquatic nurseries. It has also been intercepted at Kansai International Airport, Japan.

The wingspan is 14–17 mm (0.55–0.67 in). The larvae feed on various water plants and live underwater.
