= Eristena auropunctalis =

Scientific classification
- Kingdom: Animalia
- Phylum: Arthropoda
- Class: Insecta
- Order: Lepidoptera
- Family: Crambidae
- Subfamily: Acentropinae
- Genus: Eristena
- Species: E. auropunctalis

Binomial name
- Eristena auropunctalis (Hampson, 1903)

Synonyms
- Oligostigma auropunctalis Hampson, 1903

Species of moth

Eristena auropunctalis is a species of moth in the family Crambidae. It was described by George Hampson in 1903. It is found in Bhutan.
