= Eristena albifurcalis =

Scientific classification
- Kingdom: Animalia
- Phylum: Arthropoda
- Class: Insecta
- Order: Lepidoptera
- Family: Crambidae
- Subfamily: Acentropinae
- Genus: Eristena
- Species: E. albifurcalis

Binomial name
- Eristena albifurcalis (Hampson, 1906)

Synonyms
- Oligostigma albifurcalis Hampson, 1906

Species of moth

Eristena albifurcalis is a species of moth in the family Crambidae. It was described by George Hampson in 1906. It is found in Assam, India.
