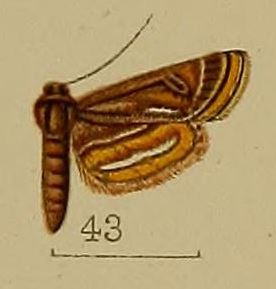

Scientific classification
- Kingdom: Animalia
- Phylum: Arthropoda
- Clade: Pancrustacea
- Class: Insecta
- Order: Lepidoptera
- Family: Crambidae
- Genus: Parapoynx
- Species: P. andreusialis

Binomial name
- Parapoynx andreusialis (Hampson, 1912)

Synonyms
- Oligostigma andreusialis Hampson, 1912

= Parapoynx andreusialis =

Species of moth

Parapoynx andreusialis is a moth of the family Crambidae. It is found in India.

This species has a wingspan of 18 mm.
