= Eristena fumibasale =

Scientific classification
- Kingdom: Animalia
- Phylum: Arthropoda
- Class: Insecta
- Order: Lepidoptera
- Family: Crambidae
- Subfamily: Acentropinae
- Genus: Eristena
- Species: E. fumibasale

Binomial name
- Eristena fumibasale (Hampson, 1896)

Synonyms
- Oligostigma fumibasale Hampson, 1896

Species of moth

Eristena fumibasale is a species of moth in the family Crambidae. It was described by George Hampson in 1896. It is found in Sri Lanka.
