= Eristena chrysozonalis =

Scientific classification
- Kingdom: Animalia
- Phylum: Arthropoda
- Class: Insecta
- Order: Lepidoptera
- Family: Crambidae
- Subfamily: Acentropinae
- Genus: Eristena
- Species: E. chrysozonalis

Binomial name
- Eristena chrysozonalis (Hampson, 1912)

Synonyms
- Oligostigma chrysozonalis Hampson, 1912

Species of moth

Eristena chrysozonalis is a species of moth in the family Crambidae. It was described by George Hampson in 1912. It is found in India (Chennai).
