= Agassiziella hapilista =

Scientific classification
- Kingdom: Animalia
- Phylum: Arthropoda
- Clade: Pancrustacea
- Class: Insecta
- Order: Lepidoptera
- Family: Crambidae
- Genus: Agassiziella
- Species: A. hapilista

Binomial name
- Agassiziella hapilista (C. Swinhoe, 1892)

Synonyms
- Cataclysta hapilista C. Swinhoe, 1892

Species of moth

Agassiziella hapilista is a species of moth in the family Crambidae first described by Charles Swinhoe in 1892. It is found in India, where it has been recorded from the Khasi Hills. It is also present in Taiwan.
