= Eristena araealis =

Scientific classification
- Kingdom: Animalia
- Phylum: Arthropoda
- Class: Insecta
- Order: Lepidoptera
- Family: Crambidae
- Subfamily: Acentropinae
- Genus: Eristena
- Species: E. araealis

Binomial name
- Eristena araealis (Hampson, 1897)

Synonyms
- Oligostigma araealis Hampson, 1897

Species of moth

Eristena araealis is a species of moth in the family Crambidae. It was described by George Hampson in 1897. It is found in Sri Lanka.
