= Eristena ornata =

Scientific classification
- Kingdom: Animalia
- Phylum: Arthropoda
- Class: Insecta
- Order: Lepidoptera
- Family: Crambidae
- Subfamily: Acentropinae
- Genus: Eristena
- Species: E. ornata

Binomial name
- Eristena ornata (Moore, 1885)

Synonyms
- Cataclysta ornata Moore, 1885

Species of moth

Eristena ornata is a species of moth in the family Crambidae. It was described by Frederic Moore in 1885. It is found in Sri Lanka.
