= Eristena parvalis =

Scientific classification
- Kingdom: Animalia
- Phylum: Arthropoda
- Class: Insecta
- Order: Lepidoptera
- Family: Crambidae
- Subfamily: Acentropinae
- Genus: Eristena
- Species: E. parvalis

Binomial name
- Eristena parvalis (Moore, 1877)

Synonyms
- Oligostigma parvalis Moore, 1877

Species of moth

Eristena parvalis is a species of moth in the family Crambidae. It was described by Frederic Moore in 1877. It is found on the Andamans.
