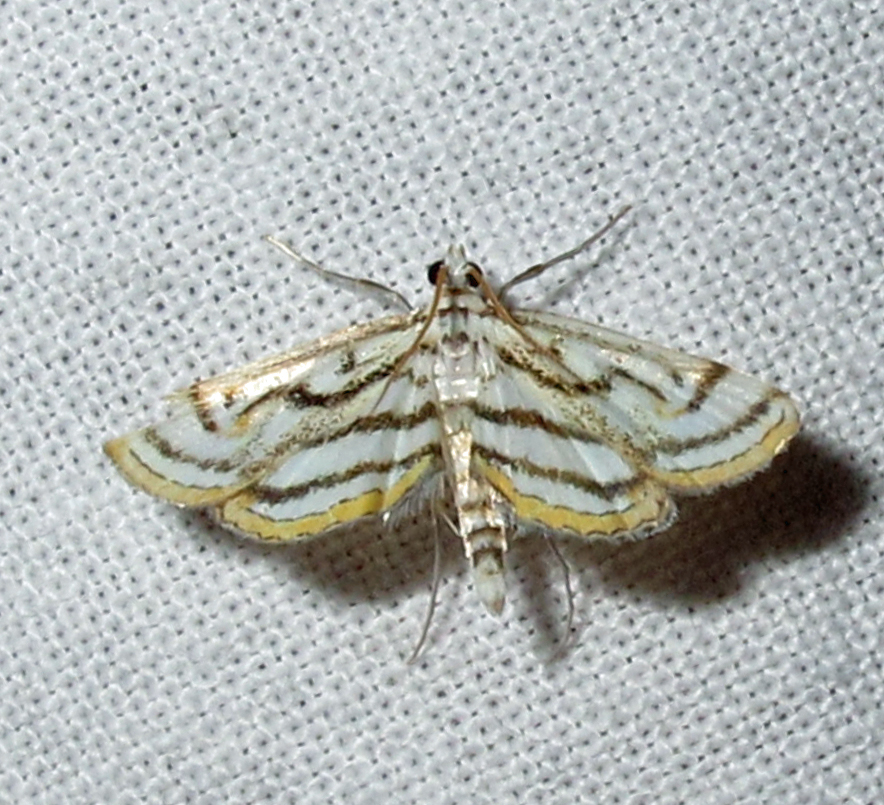

Scientific classification
- Kingdom: Animalia
- Phylum: Arthropoda
- Clade: Pancrustacea
- Class: Insecta
- Order: Lepidoptera
- Family: Crambidae
- Genus: Parapoynx
- Species: P. badiusalis

Binomial name
- Parapoynx badiusalis (Walker, 1859)

Synonyms
- Cymoriza badiusalis Walker, 1859; Nymphula badiusalis; Parapoynx albalis Robinson, 1869

= Parapoynx badiusalis =

Species of moth

Parapoynx badiusalis, the chestnut-marked pondweed moth, is a moth in the family Crambidae. It was described by Francis Walker in 1859. It is found in North America, where it has been recorded from Illinois, Indiana, Iowa, Maine, Manitoba, Maryland, Massachusetts, Michigan, Minnesota, Nebraska, New Hampshire, North Dakota, Ohio, Oklahoma, Ontario, Pennsylvania, Quebec, Saskatchewan, Vermont and Wisconsin. The habitat consists of vegetated ponds, marshes and lakeshores.

The wingspan is about 20 mm. Adults have been recorded on wing from May to September.

The larvae feed on Potamogeton species.
