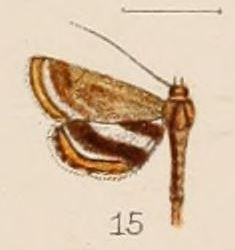

Scientific classification
- Kingdom: Animalia
- Phylum: Arthropoda
- Clade: Pancrustacea
- Class: Insecta
- Order: Lepidoptera
- Family: Crambidae
- Genus: Agassiziella
- Species: A. alicialis

Binomial name
- Agassiziella alicialis (Hampson, 1908)

Synonyms
- Oligostigma alicialis Hampson, 1908

= Agassiziella alicialis =

Species of moth

Agassiziella alicialis is a species of moth of the family Crambidae. It is found in Sri Lanka.
