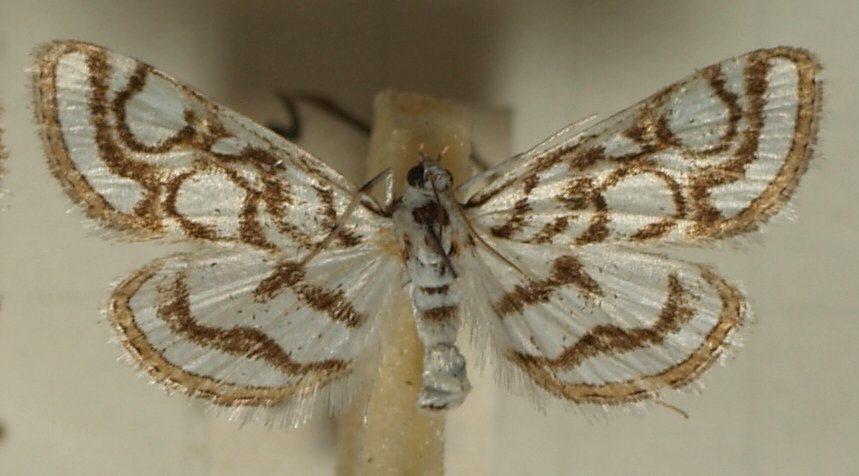
- Nymphula stagnata

Scientific classification
- Kingdom: Animalia
- Phylum: Arthropoda
- Class: Insecta
- Order: Lepidoptera
- Family: Crambidae
- Subfamily: Acentropinae
- Genus: Nymphula; Schrank, 1802

Synonyms
- Pseudoparaponyx Patocka, 1951

= Nymphula =

Genus of moths

Nymphula is a genus of moths of the family Crambidae. It was described by Franz von Paula Schrank in 1802. They have aquatic larvae.

== Species ==
- Nymphula coenosalis Snellen, 1895
- Nymphula corculina Butler, 1879
- Nymphula definitalis Strand, 1919
- Nymphula depunctalis Guenee, 1854
- Nymphula distinctalis Ragonot, 1894
- Nymphula expatrialis Hampson, 1906
- Nymphula fuscomarginalis Bremer & Grey, 1853
- Nymphula grisealis Hampson, 1912
- Nymphula lipocosmalis Snellen, 1901
- Nymphula meropalis Walker, 1859
- Nymphula nitidulata Hufnagel, 1767 – beautiful china-mark
- Nymphula simplalis Snellen, 1890
- Nymphula terranea Rothschild, 1915

== Former species ==
- Nymphula litanalis Walker, 1859
- Nymphula responsalis Walker, 1866
- Nymphula sinicalis Hampson, 1897
- Nymphula votalis Walker, 1859
