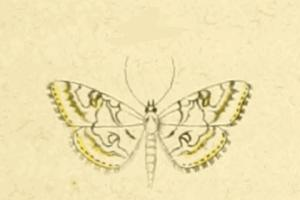

Scientific classification
- Domain: Eukaryota
- Kingdom: Animalia
- Phylum: Arthropoda
- Class: Insecta
- Order: Lepidoptera
- Family: Crambidae
- Genus: Elophila
- Species: E. rivulalis

Binomial name
- Elophila rivulalis (Duponchel, 1834)

Synonyms
- Hydrocampa rivulalis Duponchel, 1834; Nymphula rivularis Hannemann, 1967

= Elophila rivulalis =

Species of moth

Elophila rivulalis is a species of moth in the family Crambidae. It is found in the Ireland, Netherlands, Belgium, France, Germany, Poland, Austria, Hungary, Croatia, Italy and Greece.

The wingspan is 20–25 mm. The body and wings are white and have a pattern similar to that of Elophila nymphaeata. The markings have a more grayish-brown tint and are greatly reduced compared to the similar species. A relatively reliable distinguishing feature is the comparatively small discocellular spot on the hind wing. This is usually filled with white on the inside and clearly separated from the distal line. The submarginal area of both pairs of wings is very pale, pale grey tinted and bordered by grey spots inside. The fringe scales are slightly speckled. The R2 vein originates separately at the discoid cell of the forewing. Distally, it merges with the R3+4 vein for a short section and then separates from it again towards the wing edge.

The genital armature of the males is similar to that of Elophila nymphaeata and Elophila feili, but as in Elophila bourgognei, there is only a strongly sclerotized bristle on the costal margin of the valves. The uncus is blunt, the gnathos is slightly shorter than in the two similar species. The phallus is provided with two long cornuti and a terminal, sclerotized plate with three teeth. In Elophila bourgognei, on the other hand, only a long cornutus is formed.

In females, the laying tube is relatively short and strong and has slightly dilated apophyses basally. The ductus bursae is extremely short and strongly sclerotized. It widens towards the ostium. The seminal duct originates in the upper part of the corpus bursae. A signum is not formed.

== Similar species ==
The similar species Elophila nymphaea is on average slightly larger than E. rivulalis.

Distribution In Italy, adults have been recorded on wing from June to September. Older records also list sightings in April. This indicates there might be two generations per year.

The larval stage is unknown, but it is thought the larvae live in the water.
