= Deborrea seyrigi =

Scientific classification
- Kingdom: Animalia
- Phylum: Arthropoda
- Class: Insecta
- Order: Lepidoptera
- Family: Psychidae
- Genus: Deborrea
- Species: D. seyrigi

Binomial name
- Deborrea seyrigi Bourgogne, 1984

Species of moth

Deborrea seyrigi is a species of bagworm moth native to Madagascar.

== Biology ==
This species has a wingspan of 23.5–31 mm. Stated flight periods are December–May and August–September.
