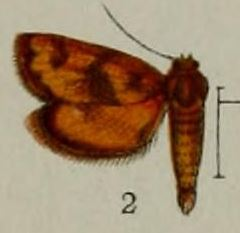
- Massepha fulvalis

Scientific classification
- Kingdom: Animalia
- Phylum: Arthropoda
- Class: Insecta
- Order: Lepidoptera
- Family: Crambidae
- Subfamily: Pyraustinae
- Genus: Massepha; Walker, 1859

= Massepha =

Genus of moths

Massepha is a genus of moths of the family Crambidae.

== Species ==
- Massepha absolutalis Walker, 1859
- Massepha ambialis Hampson, 1903
- Massepha asiusalis (Walker, 1859)
- Massepha bengalensis Moore
- Massepha entephriadia Hampson, 1898
- Massepha flavimaculata Gaede, 1917
- Massepha gracilis Hampson, 1899
- Massepha grammalis (Guenée, 1854)
- Massepha grisealis Hampson, 1917
- Massepha longipennis Hampson, 1912
- Massepha lupa (Druce, 1899)
- Massepha ohbai Yoshiyasu, 1990
- Massepha rectangulalis Caradja in Caradja & Meyrick, 1933
- Massepha rufescens Hampson, 1912
- Massepha syngamiodes Hampson, 1912
- Massepha tessmanni Gaede, 1917

== Former species ==
- Massepha carbonalis Warren
- Massepha fulvalis Hampson, 1898
