= List of Microgaster species =

These 104 species belong to the genus Microgaster, braconid wasps.

== Microgaster species ==
- Microgaster acilius Nixon, 1968
- Microgaster albomarginata Fahringer, 1935
- Microgaster alebion Nixon, 1968
- Microgaster archboldensis Fernandez-Triana, 2018
- Microgaster arctostaphylica Shaw, 2012
- Microgaster areolaris Thomson, 1895
- Microgaster asramenes Nixon, 1968
- Microgaster atropa de Saeger, 1944
- Microgaster auriculata (Fabricius, 1804)
- Microgaster australis Thomson, 1895
- Microgaster balearica Marshall, 1898
- Microgaster biaca Xu & He, 1998
- Microgaster breviterebrae Xu & He, 2003
- Microgaster brittoni Viereck, 1917
- Microgaster campestris Tobias, 1964
- Microgaster canadensis Muesebeck, 1922
- Microgaster caris Nixon, 1968
- Microgaster chrysosternis (Tobias, 1986)
- Microgaster congregatiformis Viereck, 1917
- Microgaster consors Nixon, 1968
- Microgaster crassicornis Ruthe, 1860
- Microgaster debilitata Papp, 1976
- Microgaster deceptor Nixon, 1968
- Microgaster deductor Nixon, 1968
- Microgaster discoidus Xu & He, 2000
- Microgaster ductilis Nixon, 1968
- Microgaster dudichi Papp, 1961
- Microgaster elegans Herrich-Schäffer, 1838
- Microgaster epagoges Gahan, 1917
- Microgaster erro Nixon, 1968
- Microgaster eupolis Nixon, 1968
- Microgaster famula Nixon, 1968
- Microgaster femoralamericana Shenefelt, 1973
- Microgaster ferruginea Xu & He, 2000
- Microgaster filizinancae Koçak & Kemal, 2013
- Microgaster fischeri Papp, 1960
- Microgaster flaviventris Xu & He, 2002
- Microgaster fulvicrus Thomson, 1895
- Microgaster fusca Papp, 1959
- Microgaster gelechiae Riley, 1869
- Microgaster glabritergites Xu & He, 2000
- Microgaster godzilla Fernandez-Triana & Kamino, 2020
- Microgaster gregaria (Schrank, 1781)
- Microgaster harnedi Muesebeck, 1922
- Microgaster himalayensis Cameron, 1910
- Microgaster hospes Marshall, 1885
- Microgaster hungarica Szépligeti, 1896
- Microgaster hyalina Cresson, 1865
- Microgaster intercus (Schrank, 1781)
- Microgaster kuchingensis Wilkinson, 1927
- Microgaster latitergum Song & Chen, 2004
- Microgaster leechi Walley, 1935
- Microgaster longicalcar Xu & He, 2003
- Microgaster longicaudata Xu & He, 2000
- Microgaster longiterebra Xu & He, 2000
- Microgaster luctuosa Haliday, 1834
- Microgaster magnifica Wilkinson, 1929
- Microgaster memorata Papp, 1971
- Microgaster meridiana Haliday, 1834
- Microgaster messoria Haliday, 1834
- Microgaster nerione Nixon, 1968
- Microgaster nigricans Nees, 1834
- Microgaster nitidula Wesmael, 1837
- Microgaster nixalebion Shaw, 2004
- Microgaster nixoni Austin & Dangerfield, 1992
- Microgaster nobilis Reinhard, 1880
- Microgaster novicia Marshall, 1885
- Microgaster noxia Papp, 1976
- Microgaster obscuripennata You & Xia, 1992
- Microgaster opheltes Nixon, 1968
- Microgaster ostriniae Xu & He, 2000
- Microgaster pantographae Muesebeck, 1922
- Microgaster parvistriga Thomson, 1895
- Microgaster peroneae Walley, 1935
- Microgaster phthorimaeae Muesebeck, 1922
- Microgaster planiabdominalis You, 2002
- Microgaster polita Marshall, 1885
- Microgaster postica Nees, 1834
- Microgaster procera Ruthe, 1860
- Microgaster pseudotibialis Fahringer, 1937
- Microgaster punctithorax Xu & He, 2000
- Microgaster raschkiellae Shaw, 2012
- Microgaster rava You & Zhou, 1996
- Microgaster reticulata Shestakov, 1940
- Microgaster rubricollis Spinola, 1851
- Microgaster rufipes Nees, 1834
- Microgaster ruralis Xu & He, 1998
- Microgaster scopelosomae Muesebeck, 1926
- Microgaster shennongjiaensis Xu & He, 2001
- Microgaster stictica Ruthe, 1858
- Microgaster subcompleta Nees, 1834
- Microgaster subtilipunctata Papp, 1959
- Microgaster syntopic Fernandez-Triana, 2018
- Microgaster szelenyii Papp, 1974
- Microgaster taishana Xu, He & Chen, 1998
- Microgaster tianmushana Xu & He, 2001
- Microgaster tjibodas Wilkinson, 1927
- Microgaster tortricis (Schrank, 1781)
- Microgaster tremenda Papp, 1971
- Microgaster uliginosa Thomson, 1895
- Microgaster utibilis Papp, 1976
- Microgaster varicornis Rondani, 1872
- Microgaster yichunensis Xu & Chen, 2002
- Microgaster yunnanensis Xu & He, 1999
- Microgaster zhaoi Xu & He, 1997
