= Elophila bourgognei =

Scientific classification
- Kingdom: Animalia
- Phylum: Arthropoda
- Class: Insecta
- Order: Lepidoptera
- Family: Crambidae
- Genus: Elophila
- Species: E. bourgognei

Binomial name
- Elophila bourgognei Leraut, 2001

Species of moth

Elophila bourgognei is a species of moth in the family Crambidae. It is known from France based on specimens collected in 1911; there are no later observations and the species is possibly extinct. It was named for Jean Bourgogne.

The body and wings are white. It is similar to Elophila rivulalis but differs in venation.
