= Deborrea humberti =

Scientific classification
- Kingdom: Animalia
- Phylum: Arthropoda
- Class: Insecta
- Order: Lepidoptera
- Family: Psychidae
- Genus: Deborrea
- Species: D. humberti

Binomial name
- Deborrea humberti Bourgogne, 1984

Species of moth

Deborrea humberti is a species of bagworm moth native to Madagascar.

== Biology ==
The length of the bag 35–45 mm for the male and 45–60 mm for the female. The length of the female adult is 25–35 mm with a wingspan of 37–45 mm.

Known foodplants are: Leguminosae (probably Albizzia sp.) and Casuarinaceae (Casuarina equisetifolia).

This species occurs in forest biotopes, from Port Berge to Antsiranana, Betroka to Betioky. Its flight periods are June–August and October.

== See also ==
- List of moths of Madagascar
