= Deborrea griveaudi =

Scientific classification
- Kingdom: Animalia
- Phylum: Arthropoda
- Class: Insecta
- Order: Lepidoptera
- Family: Psychidae
- Genus: Deborrea
- Species: D. griveaudi

Binomial name
- Deborrea griveaudi Bourgogne, 1982

Species of moth

Deborrea griveaudi is a species of bagworm moth native to Madagascar.

== Biology ==
This species has a wingspan of 18.5–27 mm and it is known from southern Madagascar from the surroundings of Tuléar (Andranovory).

== See also ==
- List of moths of Madagascar
