= Deborrea robinsoni =

Scientific classification
- Kingdom: Animalia
- Phylum: Arthropoda
- Class: Insecta
- Order: Lepidoptera
- Family: Psychidae
- Genus: Deborrea
- Species: D. robinsoni

Binomial name
- Deborrea robinsoni Bourgogne, 1964

Species of moth

Deborrea robinsoni is a species of bagworm moth native to Madagascar.

== Biology ==
The female has a wingspan of 22.5–23.5 mm, it is known from rainforests in southern and north-eastern Madagascar (Fort-Dauphin and the Marojejy Massif). Stated flight periods are December and March.

== See also ==
- List of moths of Madagascar
