= Nymphula terranea =

Scientific classification
- Domain: Eukaryota
- Kingdom: Animalia
- Phylum: Arthropoda
- Class: Insecta
- Order: Lepidoptera
- Family: Crambidae
- Genus: Nymphula
- Species: N. terranea

Binomial name
- Nymphula terranea Rothschild, 1915

Synonyms
- Argyractis terranea

Species of moth

Nymphula terranea is a moth in the family Crambidae. It was described by Rothschild in 1915. It is found in New Guinea.
