= Massepha rectangulalis =

Scientific classification
- Kingdom: Animalia
- Phylum: Arthropoda
- Class: Insecta
- Order: Lepidoptera
- Family: Crambidae
- Genus: Massepha
- Species: M. rectangulalis

Binomial name
- Massepha rectangulalis Caradja in Caradja & Meyrick, 1933

Species of moth

Massepha rectangulalis is a moth in the family Crambidae. It was described by Aristide Caradja in 1933. It is found in Guangdong, China.
