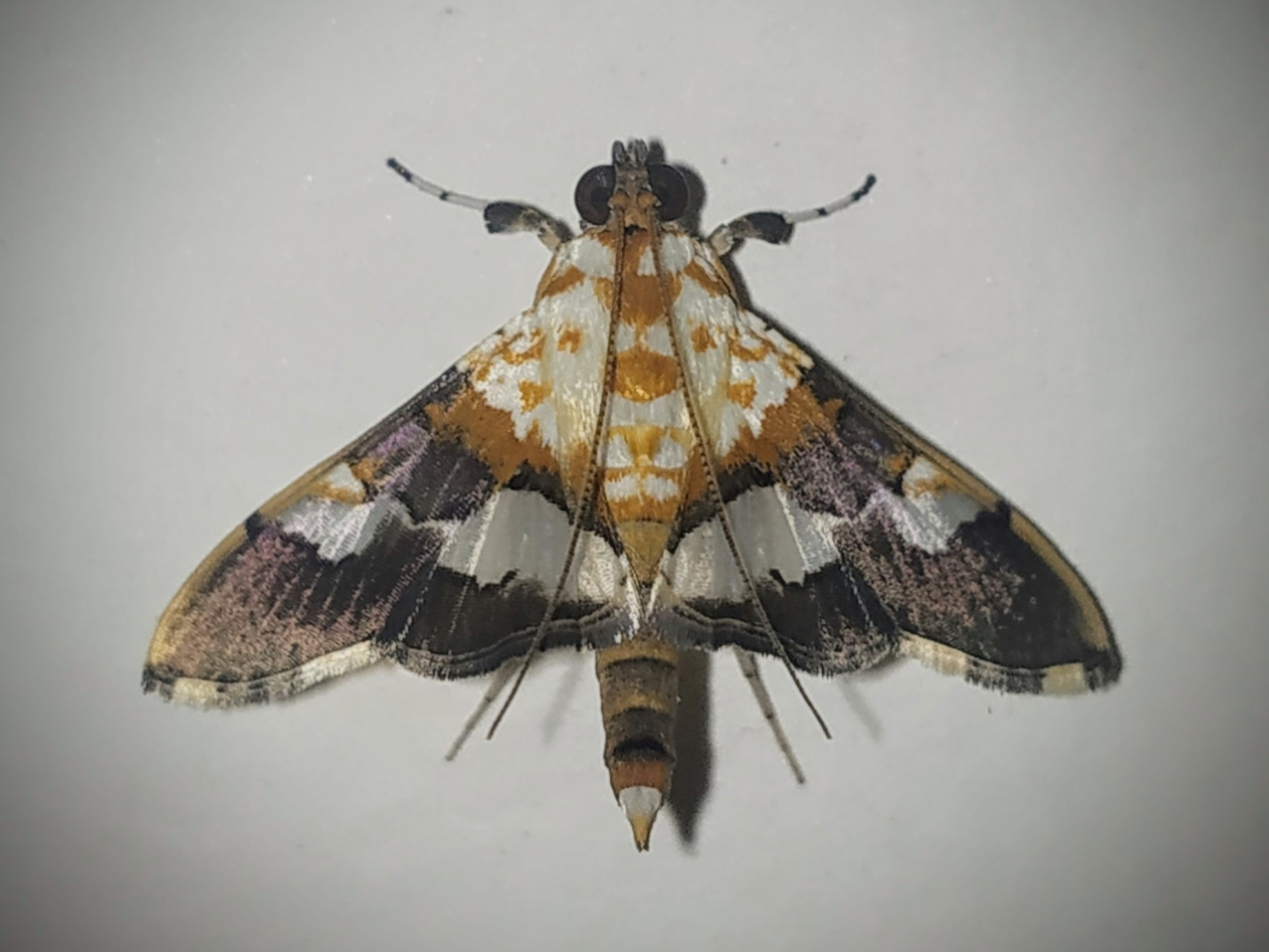

Scientific classification
- Kingdom: Animalia
- Phylum: Arthropoda
- Clade: Pancrustacea
- Class: Insecta
- Order: Lepidoptera
- Family: Crambidae
- Subfamily: Spilomelinae
- Tribe: Agroterini
- Genus: Aetholix
- Species: A. flavibasalis

Binomial name
- Aetholix flavibasalis (Guenée, 1854)

Synonyms
- Aediodes flavibasalis Guenée, 1854; Aetholix cingalesa Hampson, 1893

= Aetholix flavibasalis =

Species of moth

Aetholix flavibasalis is a species of moth in the family Crambidae. It was described by Achille Guenée in 1854. It is found in Australia (Queensland), Thailand, western India, Sri Lanka, the Andamans and on Borneo.

The larvae feed on Garcinia mangostana and Eugenia species.
