= Massepha longipennis =

Scientific classification
- Kingdom: Animalia
- Phylum: Arthropoda
- Class: Insecta
- Order: Lepidoptera
- Family: Crambidae
- Genus: Massepha
- Species: M. longipennis

Binomial name
- Massepha longipennis Hampson, 1912

Species of moth

Massepha longipennis is a moth in the family Crambidae. It was described by George Hampson in 1912. It is found in Cameroon.
