= Massepha gracilis =

Scientific classification
- Kingdom: Animalia
- Phylum: Arthropoda
- Class: Insecta
- Order: Lepidoptera
- Family: Crambidae
- Genus: Massepha
- Species: M. gracilis

Binomial name
- Massepha gracilis Hampson, 1899

Species of moth

Massepha gracilis is a moth in the family Crambidae. It was described by George Hampson in 1899. It is found in Brazil.
