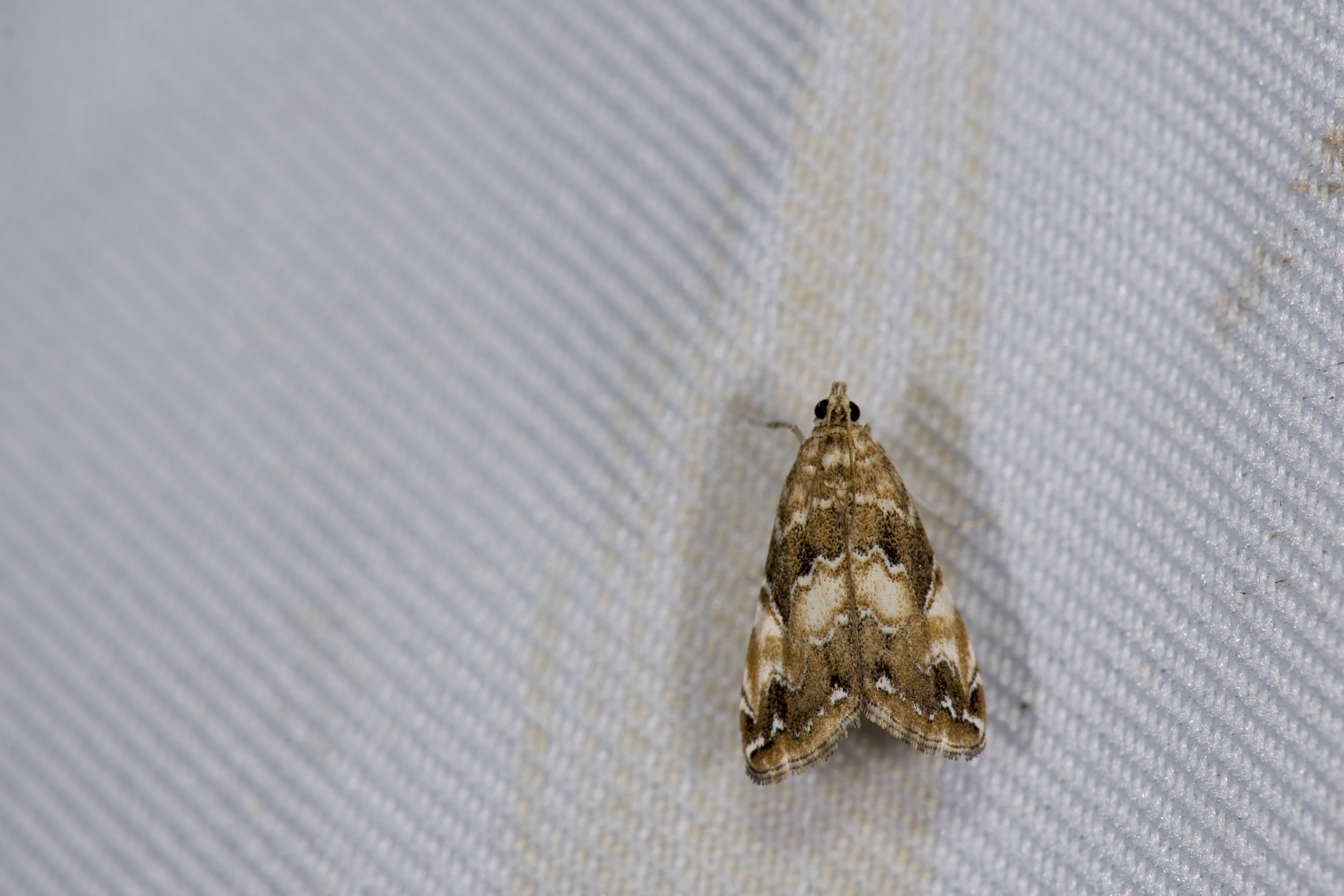

Scientific classification
- Kingdom: Animalia
- Phylum: Arthropoda
- Class: Insecta
- Order: Lepidoptera
- Family: Crambidae
- Genus: Elophila
- Species: E. turbata

Binomial name
- Elophila turbata (Butler, 1881)

Synonyms
- List: Paraponyx turbata Butler, 1881; Leparodes floralis Leech, 1889; Hydrocampa sultschana Ragonot, 1894; Parthenodes sutschana Hampson, 1900

= Elophila turbata =

Species of moth

Elophila turbata is a species of moth in the family Crambidae found in Africa and Asia. It was first described by the English entomologist Arthur Gardiner Butler in 1881 from a specimen found in Yokohama, Japan.

== Description ==
Adults have been recorded on wing from May to October in Japan.

The larvae feed on common duckweed (Spirodela polyrhiza), floating fern (Salvinia natans), Trapa japonica and Lemna perpusilla.

== Predators and parasites ==
The tiny parasitoid godzilla wasp (Microgaster godzilla) dive in ponds to hunt aquatic larvae, laying their eggs inside the bodies of other insects. In the case of Elophila turbata the wasp hunt the older larvae living in cases near the water's surface. The wasp larvae hatch and eat their host from the inside out.

== Distribution ==
'Elophila turbata is found in the Democratic Republic of the Congo, India, Taiwan, China, Korea, Japan (Hokkaido, Honshu, Shikoku, Kyushu, Yakushima, Amami islands, the Ryukyus) and the Russian Far East (Amur, Ussuri).
