= Elophila scitalis =

Scientific classification
- Kingdom: Animalia
- Phylum: Arthropoda
- Class: Insecta
- Order: Lepidoptera
- Family: Crambidae
- Genus: Elophila
- Species: E. scitalis

Binomial name
- Elophila scitalis (C. Swinhoe, 1885)

Synonyms
- Hydrocampa scitalis C. Swinhoe, 1885

Species of moth

Elophila scitalis is a species of moth in the family Crambidae. It was described by Charles Swinhoe in 1885. It is found in India.
