= Nymphula grisealis =

Scientific classification
- Kingdom: Animalia
- Phylum: Arthropoda
- Class: Insecta
- Order: Lepidoptera
- Family: Crambidae
- Genus: Nymphula
- Species: N. grisealis

Binomial name
- Nymphula grisealis Hampson, 1912

Species of moth

Nymphula grisealis is a moth in the family Crambidae. It was described by George Hampson in 1912. It is found in Sri Lanka.
