= Massepha flavimaculata =

Scientific classification
- Domain: Eukaryota
- Kingdom: Animalia
- Phylum: Arthropoda
- Class: Insecta
- Order: Lepidoptera
- Family: Crambidae
- Genus: Massepha
- Species: M. flavimaculata

Binomial name
- Massepha flavimaculata Gaede, 1917

Species of moth

Massepha flavimaculata is a moth in the family Crambidae. It was described by Max Gaede in 1917. It is found in Equatorial Guinea.
