= Deborrea cambouei =

Scientific classification
- Kingdom: Animalia
- Phylum: Arthropoda
- Class: Insecta
- Order: Lepidoptera
- Family: Psychidae
- Genus: Deborrea
- Species: D. cambouei

Binomial name
- Deborrea cambouei (Oberthür, 1922)

Species of moth

Deborrea cambouei is a species of bagworm moth native to Madagascar.

== Biology ==
The length of the bag of the male is 35mm, the wingspan of male adults is 28mm. it is known from Imerina and a known flight period is December.

== See also ==
- List of moths of Madagascar
