= Massepha bengalensis =

Scientific classification
- Domain: Eukaryota
- Kingdom: Animalia
- Phylum: Arthropoda
- Class: Insecta
- Order: Lepidoptera
- Family: Crambidae
- Genus: Massepha
- Species: M. bengalensis

Binomial name
- Massepha bengalensis (Moore, 1892)

Synonyms
- Hydrocampa bengalensis Moore, 1892

Species of moth

Massepha bengalensis is a moth in the family Crambidae. It was described by Frederic Moore in 1892. It is found in north-eastern India.
