= Massepha entephriadia =

Scientific classification
- Kingdom: Animalia
- Phylum: Arthropoda
- Class: Insecta
- Order: Lepidoptera
- Family: Crambidae
- Genus: Massepha
- Species: M. entephriadia

Binomial name
- Massepha entephriadia Hampson, 1898

Species of moth

Massepha entephriadia is a moth in the family Crambidae. It was described by George Hampson in 1898. It is found in Nigeria.
