= Elophila aristodora =

Scientific classification
- Kingdom: Animalia
- Phylum: Arthropoda
- Class: Insecta
- Order: Lepidoptera
- Family: Crambidae
- Genus: Elophila
- Species: E. aristodora

Binomial name
- Elophila aristodora (Turner, 1908)

Synonyms
- Nymphula aristodora Turner, 1908

Species of moth

Elophila aristodora is a species of moth in the family Crambidae. It was described by Turner in 1908. It is found on Australia, where it has been recorded from Queensland. The species has also been found in Western Australia.
