= Elophila nebulosalis =

Scientific classification
- Kingdom: Animalia
- Phylum: Arthropoda
- Class: Insecta
- Order: Lepidoptera
- Family: Crambidae
- Genus: Elophila
- Species: E. nebulosalis

Binomial name
- Elophila nebulosalis (Fernald, 1887)

Synonyms
- Hydrocampa nebulosalis Fernald, 1887; Munroessa nebulosalis

Species of moth

Elophila nebulosalis, the nebulous munroessa moth, is a species of moth in the family Crambidae. It was described by Charles H. Fernald in 1887. It is found in North America, where it has been recorded from South Carolina to Florida.

The larvae are thought to be aquatic.
