= Elophila roesleri =

Scientific classification
- Kingdom: Animalia
- Phylum: Arthropoda
- Clade: Pancrustacea
- Class: Insecta
- Order: Lepidoptera
- Family: Crambidae
- Genus: Elophila
- Species: E. roesleri

Binomial name
- Elophila roesleri Speidel, 1984

Species of moth

Elophila roesleri is a species of moth in the family Crambidae. It was described by Speidel in 1984. It is found in China (Yunnan).
