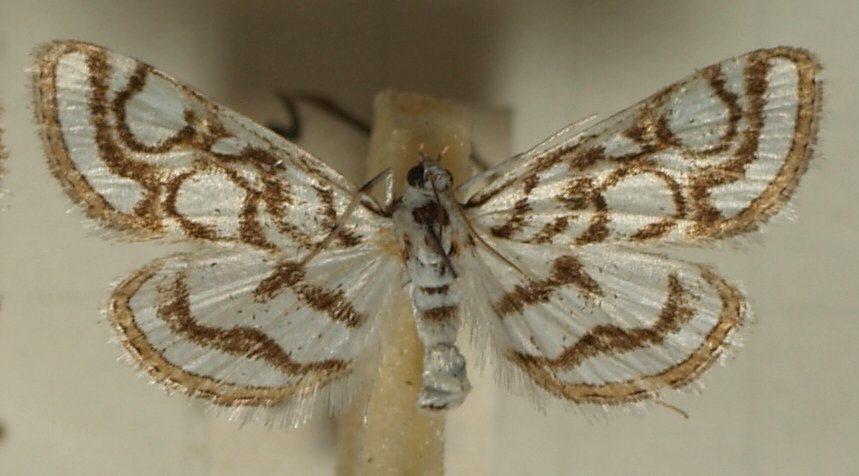

Scientific classification
- Kingdom: Animalia
- Phylum: Arthropoda
- Class: Insecta
- Order: Lepidoptera
- Family: Crambidae
- Genus: Nymphula
- Species: N. nitidulata

Binomial name
- Nymphula nitidulata (Hufnagel, 1767)

Synonyms
- Nymphula stagnata; Phalaena (Pyralis) potamogalis Hübner, 1793; Phalaena stagnata Donovan, 1806; Hydrocampa stagnalis Guenée, 1854

= Nymphula nitidulata =

Beautiful china-mark

Species of moth

Nymphula nitidulata, the beautiful china-mark, is a species of moth of the family Crambidae described by Johann Siegfried Hufnagel in 1767. It is found in Europe, Japan (Hokkaido), Turkey, Armenia, Russia (including Ural, Siberia, Amur) and China.

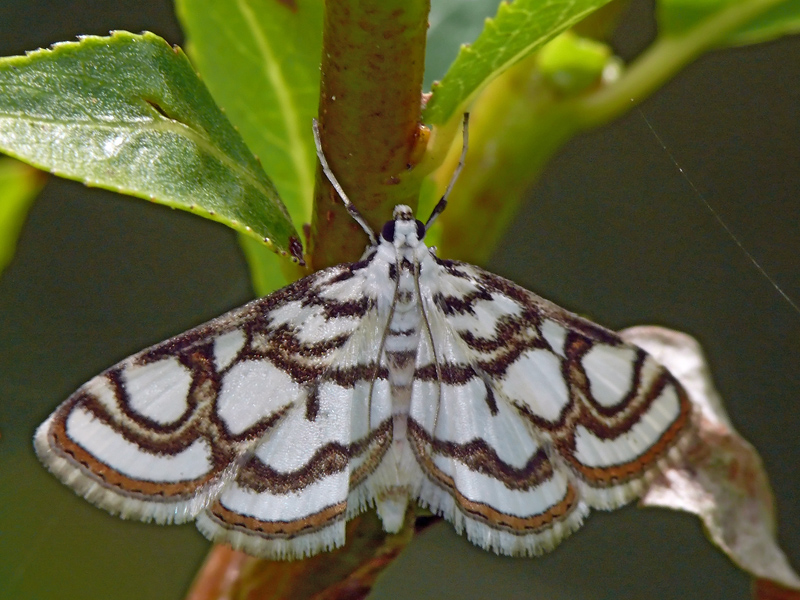

The wingspan is 20–25 mm. The forewings are white; costal edge and sometimes a subcostal line dark fuscous; a curved dark fuscous subbasal line; lines and transverse discal spots strongly outlined with dark fuscous, sometimes partly brownish, first curved, second indented below middle, connected by a prolongation with discal spot and first line, lines sometimes also connected on dorsum; a yellow-ochreous dark-margined terminal streak. Hindwings as forewings, but lines narrower, not connected, subbasal absent, discal mark oblique, narrow, dark fuscous, usually touching first line The larva is bright yellow or brownish-yellow; dorsalline dark brownish; head pale brown.

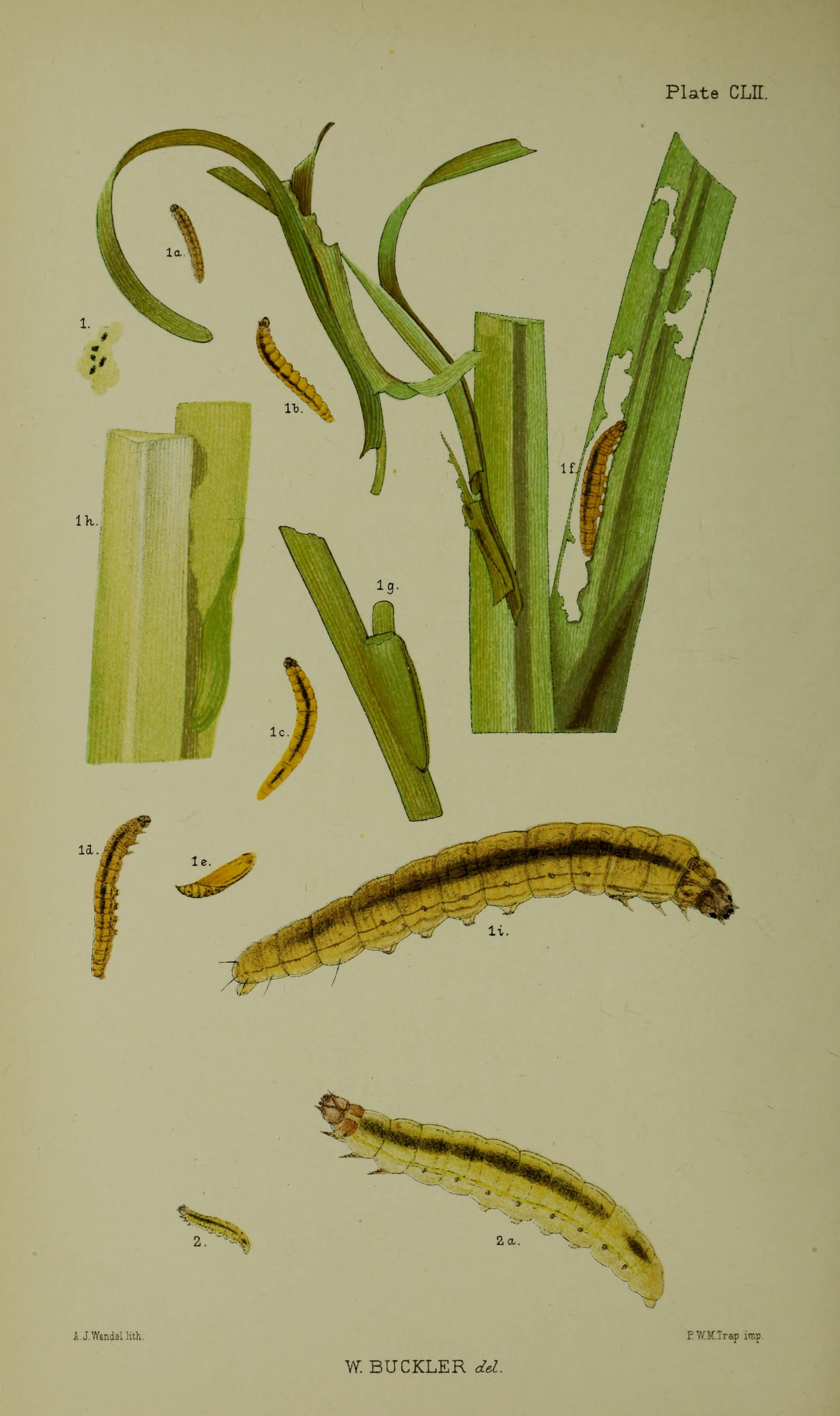
Figs.1 egg mass 1a, 1b, ic, 1d, 1e, 1f larvae in various stages of growth 1g, 1h cocoons 1ilarva highly magnified (mining Sparganium simplex and S. ramosum underwater)

The larvae feed on Sparganium and Nuphar lutea.
