= Elophila fluvialis =

Scientific classification
- Kingdom: Animalia
- Phylum: Arthropoda
- Class: Insecta
- Order: Lepidoptera
- Family: Crambidae
- Genus: Elophila
- Species: E. fluvialis

Binomial name
- Elophila fluvialis (Schaus, 1912)

Synonyms
- Nymphula fluvialis Schaus, 1912

Species of moth

Elophila fluvialis is a species of moth in the family Crambidae. It was described by Schaus in 1912. It is found in Costa Rica.
