= Nymphula lipocosmalis =

Scientific classification
- Kingdom: Animalia
- Phylum: Arthropoda
- Class: Insecta
- Order: Lepidoptera
- Family: Crambidae
- Genus: Nymphula
- Species: N. lipocosmalis

Binomial name
- Nymphula lipocosmalis (Snellen, 1901)

Synonyms
- Hydrocampa lipocosmalis Snellen, 1901

Species of moth

Nymphula lipocosmalis is a moth in the family Crambidae. It was described by Snellen in 1901. It is found on Java.
