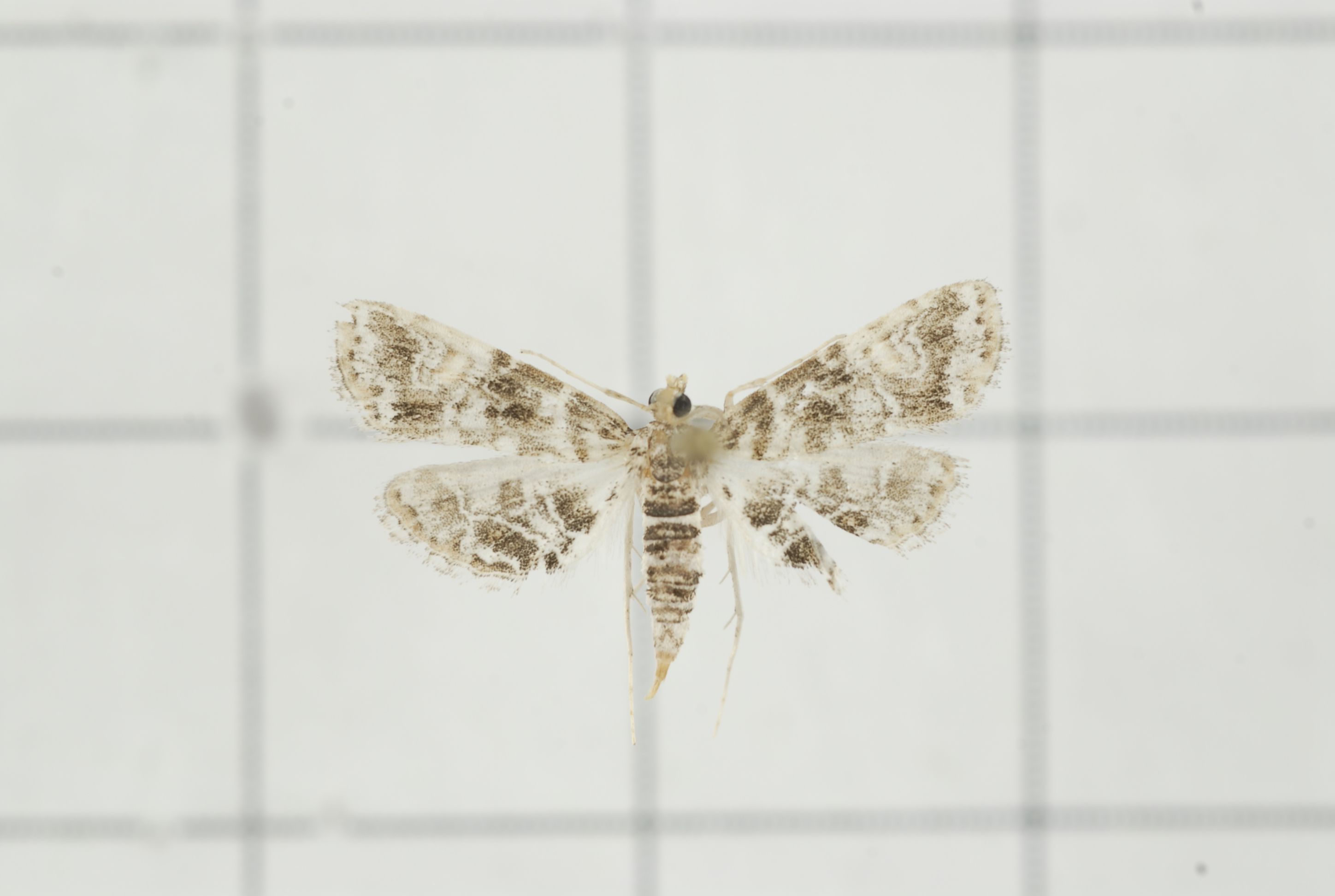

Scientific classification
- Kingdom: Animalia
- Phylum: Arthropoda
- Class: Insecta
- Order: Lepidoptera
- Family: Crambidae
- Genus: Elophila
- Species: E. nigralbalis

Binomial name
- Elophila nigralbalis (Caradja, 1925)

Synonyms
- Nymphula diffualis nigralbalis Caradja, 1925

= Elophila nigralbalis =

Species of moth

Elophila nigralbalis is a species of moth in the family Crambidae. It was described by Aristide Caradja in 1925. It is found in Japan (Honshu, Shikoku, Kyushu, the Ryukyus), Vietnam, Indonesia and Taiwan.

The length of the forewings is 4.8-5.7 mm for males and 6.3-7.3 mm for females.

The larvae feed on Azolla species and Marsilea quadrifolia. Full-grown larvae reach a length of 11–15 mm.
