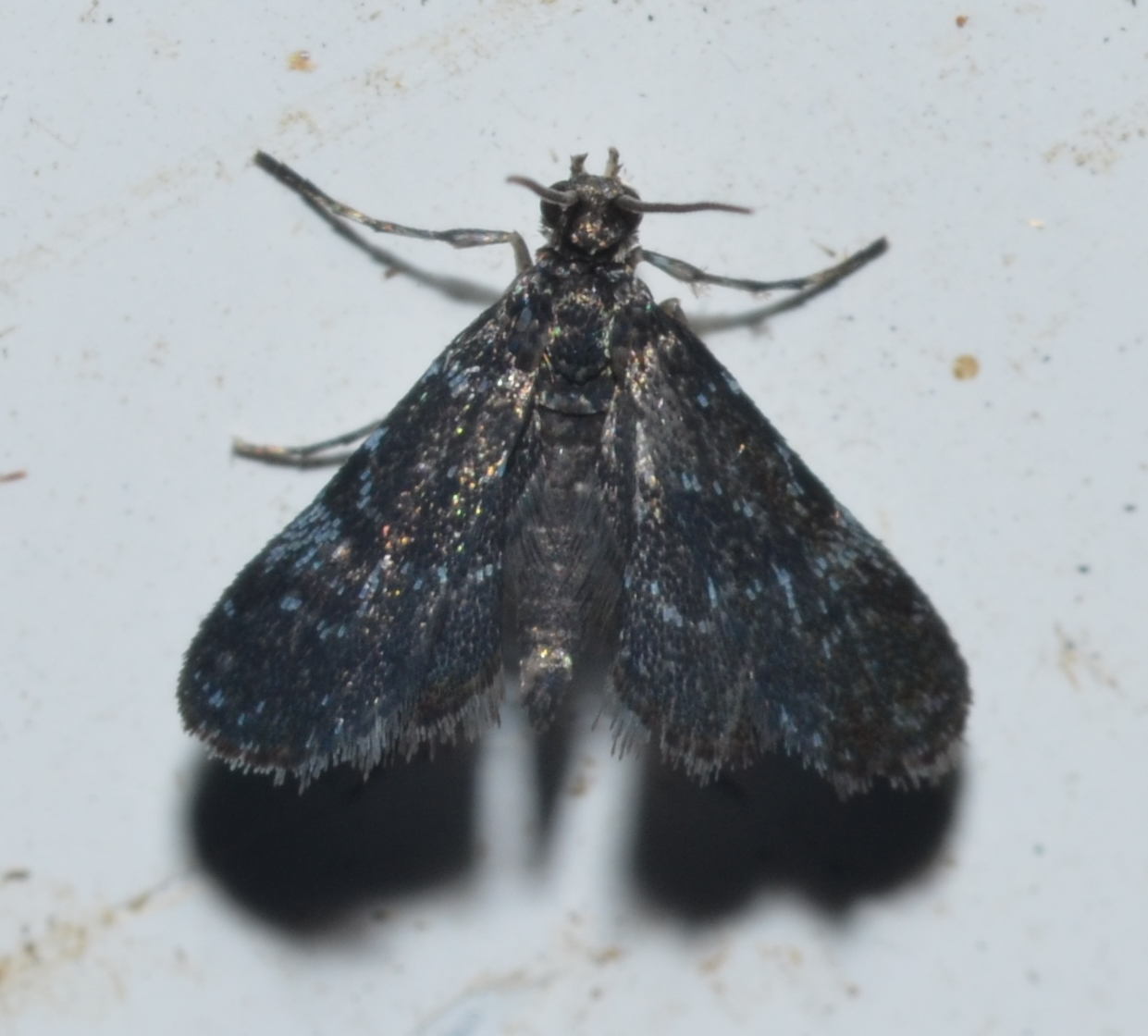

Scientific classification
- Kingdom: Animalia
- Phylum: Arthropoda
- Class: Insecta
- Order: Lepidoptera
- Family: Crambidae
- Genus: Elophila
- Species: E. tinealis

Binomial name
- Elophila tinealis (Munroe, 1972)

Synonyms
- Synclita tinealis Munroe, 1972

= Elophila tinealis =

Species of moth

Elophila tinealis, the black duckweed moth, is a species of moth in the family Crambidae. It was described by Eugene G. Munroe in 1972. It is found in North America, where it has been recorded from Michigan, Ontario and New York, south to Florida and west to Texas. The habitat consists of swamps and wet woods.

The larvae feed on Lemna species.
