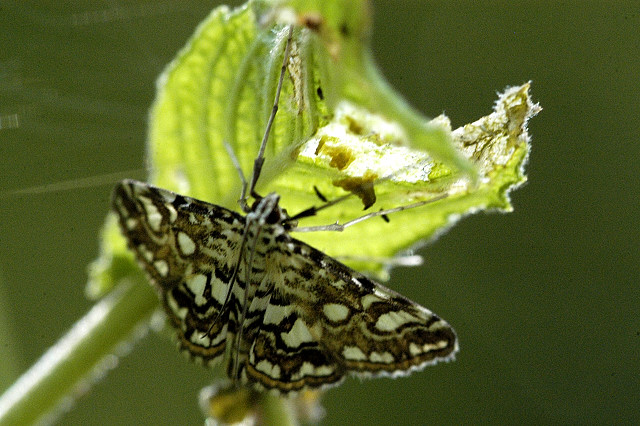
- Elophila nymphaeata

Scientific classification
- Kingdom: Animalia
- Phylum: Arthropoda
- Class: Insecta
- Order: Lepidoptera
- Family: Crambidae
- Subfamily: Acentropinae
- Genus: Elophila; Hübner, 1822

Synonyms
- Cyrtogramme Yoshiyasu, 1985; Elophila Hübner, 1806; Hydrocampus Berthold, 1827; Hydrocampa Stephens, 1829; Hydrocampe Latreille, 1829; Munroessa Lange, 1956; Synclita Lederer, 1863

= Elophila =

Genus of moths

Elophila is a genus of moths of the family Crambidae described by Jacob Hübner in 1822.

== Species ==
- Elophila acornutus Agassiz, 2012
- Elophila africalis (Hampson, 1906)
- Elophila aristodora (Turner, 1908)
- Elophila atlantica (Munroe, 1972)
- Elophila bourgognei Leraut, 2001
- Elophila difflualis (Snellen, 1880)
- Elophila ealensis (Agassiz, 2012)
- Elophila ekthlipsis (Grote, 1876)
- Elophila faulalis (Walker, 1859)
- Elophila feili Speidel, 2002
- Elophila fengwhanalis (Pryer, 1877)
- Elophila fluvialis (Schaus, 1912)
- Elophila fulvalis (Hampson, 1899)
- Elophila gurgitalis (Lederer, 1863)
- Elophila gyralis (Hulst, 1886)
- Elophila icciusalis (Walker, 1859)
- Elophila interruptalis (Pryer, 1877)
- Elophila manilensis (Hampson, 1917)
- Elophila maralis (Schaus, 1920)
- Elophila melagynalis (D. J. L. Agassiz, 1978)
- Elophila melanolepis (Hampson, 1919)
- Elophila minima Agassiz, 2012
- Elophila minimalis (Saalmüller, 1880)
- Elophila minoralis (Mabille, 1881)
- Elophila monetalis (Snellen, 1880)
- Elophila nebulosalis (Fernald, 1887)
- Elophila nigralbalis (Caradja, 1925)
- Elophila nigrolinealis (Pryer, 1877)
- Elophila nuda F.Q. Chen, C.S. Wu & D.Y. Xue, 2010
- Elophila nymphaeata Linnaeus, 1758– brown china-mark
- Elophila obliteralis (Walker, 1859)
- Elophila occidentalis (Lange, 1956)
- Elophila orientalis (Filipjev, 1933)
- Elophila palliolatalis (Swinhoe, 1890)
- Elophila radiospinula F.Q. Chen, C.S. Wu & D.Y. Xue, 2010
- Elophila responsalis (Walker, 1866)
- Elophila rivulalis Duponchel, 1834
- Elophila roesleri Speidel, 1984
- Elophila rosetta (Meyrick, 1938)
- Elophila scitalis (Swinhoe, 1885)
- Elophila separatalis (Leech, 1889)
- Elophila serralinealis (Barnes & Benjamin, 1924)
- Elophila sinicalis (Hampson, 1897)
- Elophila tenebralis (Lower, 1902)
- Elophila tinealis (Munroe, 1972)
- Elophila turbata (Butler, 1881)
