= Massepha ohbai =

Scientific classification
- Domain: Eukaryota
- Kingdom: Animalia
- Phylum: Arthropoda
- Class: Insecta
- Order: Lepidoptera
- Family: Crambidae
- Genus: Massepha
- Species: M. ohbai

Binomial name
- Massepha ohbai Yoshiyasu, 1990

Species of moth

Massepha ohbai is a moth in the family Crambidae. It was described by Yoshiyasu in 1990. It is found in Japan (Kyushu).
