= Elophila rosetta =

Scientific classification
- Kingdom: Animalia
- Phylum: Arthropoda
- Class: Insecta
- Order: Lepidoptera
- Family: Crambidae
- Genus: Elophila
- Species: E. rosetta

Binomial name
- Elophila rosetta (Meyrick, 1938)

Synonyms
- Ambia rosetta Meyrick, 1938

Species of moth

Elophila rosetta is a species of moth in the family Crambidae. It was described by Edward Meyrick in 1938. It is found on Java in Indonesia.
