= Elophila minoralis =

Scientific classification
- Kingdom: Animalia
- Phylum: Arthropoda
- Class: Insecta
- Order: Lepidoptera
- Family: Crambidae
- Genus: Elophila
- Species: E. minoralis

Binomial name
- Elophila minoralis (Mabille, 1881)

Synonyms
- Parapoynx minoralis Mabille, 1881

Species of moth

Elophila minoralis is a species of moth of the family Crambidae that is found in Madagascar.
