= Elophila monetalis =

Scientific classification
- Kingdom: Animalia
- Phylum: Arthropoda
- Clade: Pancrustacea
- Class: Insecta
- Order: Lepidoptera
- Family: Crambidae
- Genus: Elophila
- Species: E. monetalis

Binomial name
- Elophila monetalis (Snellen, 1880)

Synonyms
- Cymoriza monetalis Snellen, 1880

Species of moth

Elophila monetalis is a species of moth in the family Crambidae. It was described by Snellen in 1880. It is found on Sulawesi.There is no listed species like this.
