= Elophila minimalis =

Scientific classification
- Kingdom: Animalia
- Phylum: Arthropoda
- Clade: Pancrustacea
- Class: Insecta
- Order: Lepidoptera
- Family: Crambidae
- Genus: Elophila
- Species: E. minimalis

Binomial name
- Elophila minimalis (Saalmüller, 1880)

Synonyms
- Hydrocampa minimalis Saalmüller, 1880

Species of moth

Elophila minimalis is a species of moth of the family Crambidae. It was described by Max Saalmüller in 1880 and is found in Madagascar.

It has a wingspan of 7 mm.
