= Elophila minima =

Scientific classification
- Kingdom: Animalia
- Phylum: Arthropoda
- Class: Insecta
- Order: Lepidoptera
- Family: Crambidae
- Genus: Elophila
- Species: E. minima

Binomial name
- Elophila minima Agassiz, 2012

Species of moth

Elophila minima is a species of moth in the family Crambidae. It was described by David John Lawrence Agassiz in 2012. It is found in Ghana, Kenya, Nigeria, Sierra Leone, South Africa and Uganda.

The wingspan is 9–12 mm for males and 12–14 mm for females. Adults are sexually dimorphic. Adults have been recorded on wing from January to March, in May, from July to August and from November to December.

== Etymology ==
The species name refers to the small size of the species.
