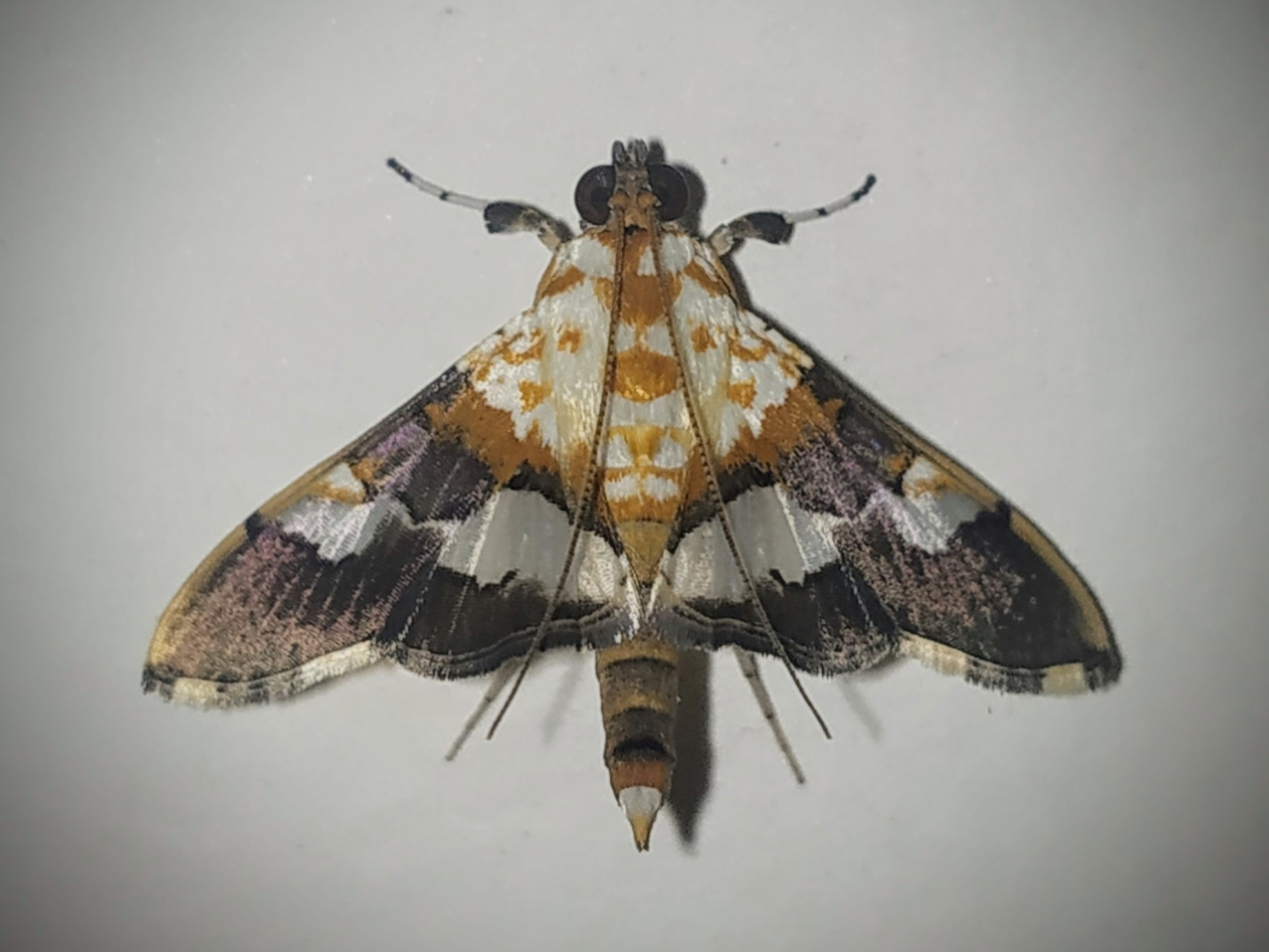
- Aetholix flavibasalis

Scientific classification
- Kingdom: Animalia
- Phylum: Arthropoda
- Clade: Pancrustacea
- Class: Insecta
- Order: Lepidoptera
- Family: Crambidae
- Tribe: Agroterini
- Genus: Aetholix; Lederer, 1863

= Aetholix =

Genus of moths

Aetholix is a genus of moths of the family Crambidae.

== Species ==
- Aetholix borneensis Hampson, 1912
- Aetholix flavibasalis (Guenée, 1854)
- Aetholix indecisalis (Warren, 1896)
- Aetholix litanalis (Walker, 1859)
- Aetholix meropalis (Walker, 1859)
