= Nymphula definitalis =

Scientific classification
- Domain: Eukaryota
- Kingdom: Animalia
- Phylum: Arthropoda
- Class: Insecta
- Order: Lepidoptera
- Family: Crambidae
- Genus: Nymphula
- Species: N. definitalis

Binomial name
- Nymphula definitalis Strand, 1919

Species of moth

Nymphula definitalis is a moth in the family Crambidae. It was described by Strand in 1919. It is found in Taiwan.
