= Elophila nuda =

Scientific classification
- Kingdom: Animalia
- Phylum: Arthropoda
- Clade: Pancrustacea
- Class: Insecta
- Order: Lepidoptera
- Family: Crambidae
- Genus: Elophila
- Species: E. nuda

Binomial name
- Elophila nuda F.Q. Chen, C.S. Wu & D.Y. Xue, 2010

Species of moth

Elophila nuda is a species of moth in the family Crambidae. It was described by Fu-Qiang Chen, Chun-Sheng Wu and Da-Yong Xue in 2010. It is found in Yunnan, China.
