= Elophila difflualis =

Scientific classification
- Kingdom: Animalia
- Phylum: Arthropoda
- Clade: Pancrustacea
- Class: Insecta
- Order: Lepidoptera
- Family: Crambidae
- Genus: Elophila
- Species: E. difflualis

Binomial name
- Elophila difflualis Snellen, 1880

Synonyms
- Hydrocampa difflualis Snellen, 1880

Species of moth

Elophila difflualis is a species of moth of the family Crambidae. The species was first described by Pieter Cornelius Tobias Snellen in 1880. It is found in South-East Asia, in Australia and Réunion but has also been introduced to the United Kingdom.

The wingspan is 11–13 mm for males and 13–18 mm for females.

The larvae feed on Hydrocharitaceae (Valisneria sp.), Rosaceae (Synnema sp.), Alismataceae (Echinodorus sp.), Potamogetonaceae (Potamogeton sp.), Marsileaceae (Marsilea sp.)
