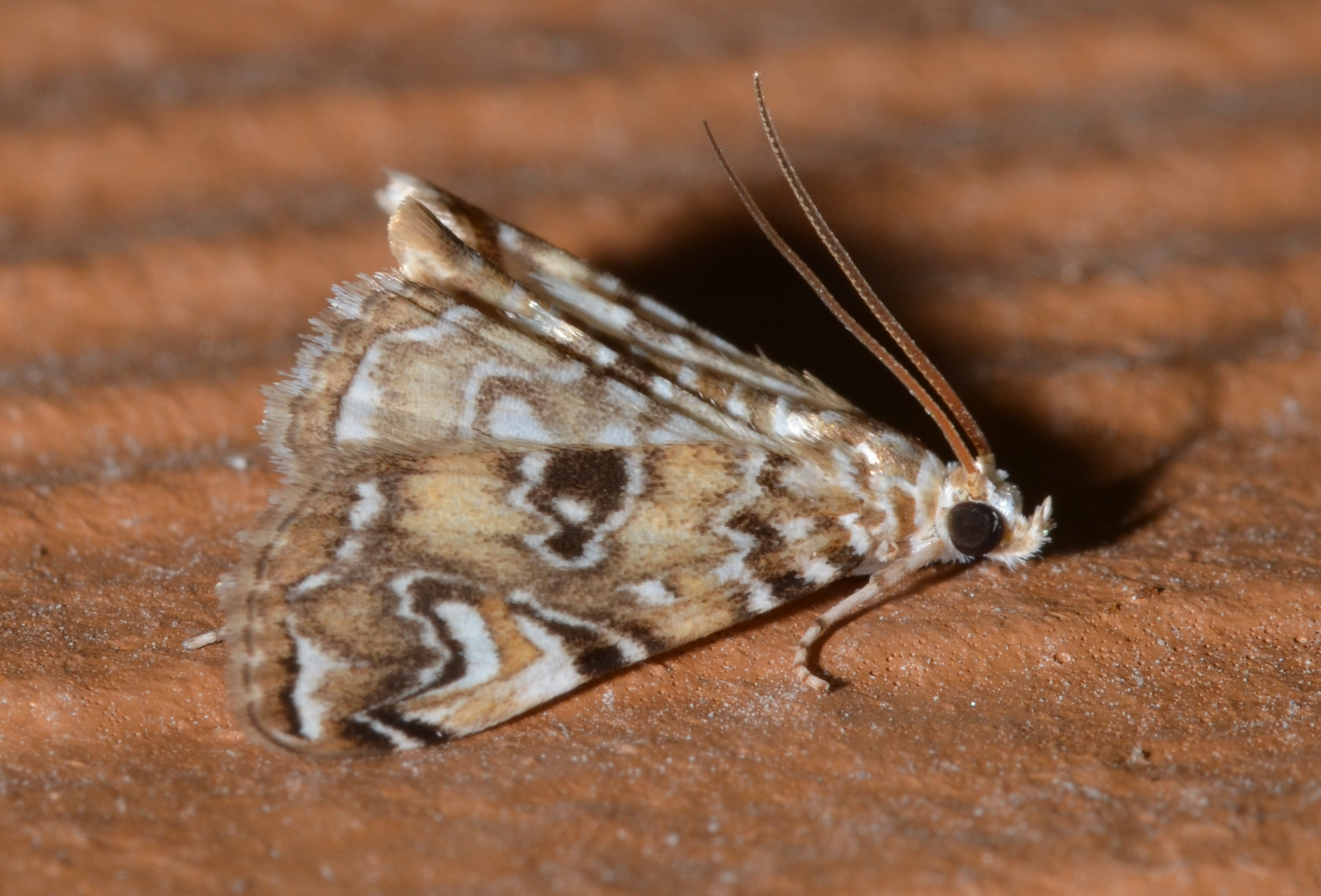

Scientific classification
- Kingdom: Animalia
- Phylum: Arthropoda
- Class: Insecta
- Order: Lepidoptera
- Family: Crambidae
- Genus: Elophila
- Species: E. gyralis

Binomial name
- Elophila gyralis (Hulst, 1886)

Synonyms
- Hydrocampa gyralis Hulst, 1886; Nymphula dentilinea Hampson, 1897; Nymphula gyralis serralinealis Barnes & Benjamin, 1924

= Elophila gyralis =

Species of moth

Elophila gyralis, the waterlily borer moth, is a species of moth in the family Crambidae. It was described by George Duryea Hulst in 1886. It is found in eastern North America, where it has been recorded from Alabama, Florida, Georgia, Illinois, Indiana, Iowa, Louisiana, Maine, Maryland, Massachusetts, Michigan, Minnesota, Mississippi, New Brunswick, New Hampshire, New Jersey, New York, North Carolina, Nova Scotia, Ohio, Oklahoma, Ontario, Pennsylvania, Quebec, South Carolina, Tennessee, Texas and Wisconsin.

The wingspan is 16–30 mm. Adults have been recorded on wing year round in the southern part of the range.

== Subspecies ==
- Elophila gyralis gyralis
- Elophila gyralis serralinealis (Barnes & Benjamin, 1924)
