= Massepha ambialis =

Scientific classification
- Kingdom: Animalia
- Phylum: Arthropoda
- Class: Insecta
- Order: Lepidoptera
- Family: Crambidae
- Genus: Massepha
- Species: M. ambialis

Binomial name
- Massepha ambialis Hampson, 1903

Species of moth

Massepha ambialis is a moth in the family Crambidae. It was described by George Hampson in 1903. It is found in India.
