= Massepha syngamiodes =

Scientific classification
- Kingdom: Animalia
- Phylum: Arthropoda
- Class: Insecta
- Order: Lepidoptera
- Family: Crambidae
- Genus: Massepha
- Species: M. syngamiodes

Binomial name
- Massepha syngamiodes Hampson, 1912

Synonyms
- Massepha syngamoides Klima, 1937

Species of moth

Massepha syngamiodes is a moth in the family Crambidae. It was described by George Hampson in 1912. It is found in Argentina.
