= Elophila acornutus =

Scientific classification
- Kingdom: Animalia
- Phylum: Arthropoda
- Clade: Pancrustacea
- Class: Insecta
- Order: Lepidoptera
- Family: Crambidae
- Genus: Elophila
- Species: E. acornutus

Binomial name
- Elophila acornutus Agassiz, 2012

Species of moth

Elophila acornutus is a species of moth in the family Crambidae. It was described by David John Lawrence Agassiz in 2012. It is found in the Democratic Republic of the Congo, Sudan and Uganda.

The wingspan is 12–14 mm for males and 15–17 mm for females. Adults have been recorded on wing from January to February and from April to May.

== Etymology ==
The species name refers to the absence of cornuti in the aedeagus.
