= Elophila melanolepis =

Scientific classification
- Kingdom: Animalia
- Phylum: Arthropoda
- Class: Insecta
- Order: Lepidoptera
- Family: Crambidae
- Genus: Elophila
- Species: E. melanolepis

Binomial name
- Elophila melanolepis (Hampson, 1919)

Synonyms
- Crambus melanolepis Hampson, 1919

Species of moth

Elophila melanolepis is a species of moth in the family Crambidae. It was described by George Hampson in 1919. It is found in Peru.
