= Elophila separatalis =

Scientific classification
- Kingdom: Animalia
- Phylum: Arthropoda
- Class: Insecta
- Order: Lepidoptera
- Family: Crambidae
- Genus: Elophila
- Species: E. separatalis

Binomial name
- Elophila separatalis (Leech, 1889)

Synonyms
- Hydrocampa separatalis Leech, 1889; Elophila miurai Yoshiyasu, 1985

Species of moth

Elophila separatalis is a species of moth in the family Crambidae. It was described by John Henry Leech in 1889. It is found in China, North Korea and Honshu, Japan.

The length of the forewings is 10.1 mm for males and 10.7-11.3 mm for females.
