= Nymphula simplalis =

Scientific classification
- Kingdom: Animalia
- Phylum: Arthropoda
- Class: Insecta
- Order: Lepidoptera
- Family: Crambidae
- Genus: Nymphula
- Species: N. simplalis

Binomial name
- Nymphula simplalis (Snellen, 1890)

Synonyms
- Hydrocampa simplalis Snellen, 1890

Species of moth

Nymphula simplalis is a moth in the family Crambidae. It was described by Snellen in 1890. It is found in India (Sikkim).
