= Elophila nigrolinealis =

Scientific classification
- Kingdom: Animalia
- Phylum: Arthropoda
- Class: Insecta
- Order: Lepidoptera
- Family: Crambidae
- Genus: Elophila
- Species: E. nigrolinealis

Binomial name
- Elophila nigrolinealis (Pryer, 1877)

Synonyms
- Hydrocampa nigrolinealis Pryer, 1877

Species of moth

Elophila nigrolinealis is a species of moth in the family Crambidae. It was described by Pryer in 1877. It is found in China (Shanghai) and Japan.
