= Massepha absolutalis =

Scientific classification
- Kingdom: Animalia
- Phylum: Arthropoda
- Class: Insecta
- Order: Lepidoptera
- Family: Crambidae
- Genus: Massepha
- Species: M. absolutalis

Binomial name
- Massepha absolutalis Walker, 1859

Synonyms
- Massepha marginalis Swinhoe, 1906

Species of moth

Massepha absolutalis is a moth in the family Crambidae. It was described by Francis Walker in 1859. It is found in Sri Lanka and India.
