= Aetholix borneensis =

Scientific classification
- Kingdom: Animalia
- Phylum: Arthropoda
- Clade: Pancrustacea
- Class: Insecta
- Order: Lepidoptera
- Family: Crambidae
- Subfamily: Spilomelinae
- Tribe: Agroterini
- Genus: Aetholix
- Species: A. borneensis

Binomial name
- Aetholix borneensis Hampson, 1912

Species of moth

Aetholix borneensis is a moth in the family Crambidae. It was described by George Hampson in 1912. It is found on Borneo.
