= Elophila tenebralis =

Scientific classification
- Kingdom: Animalia
- Phylum: Arthropoda
- Class: Insecta
- Order: Lepidoptera
- Family: Crambidae
- Genus: Elophila
- Species: E. tenebralis

Binomial name
- Elophila tenebralis (Lower, 1902)

Synonyms
- Nymphula tenebralis Lower, 1902; Parapoynx tenebralis

Species of moth

Elophila tenebralis is a species of moth in the family Crambidae. It was described by Oswald Bertram Lower in 1902. It is found in Australia, where it has been recorded from Queensland, Western Australia and Northern Territory.
