= Elophila fengwhanalis =

Scientific classification
- Kingdom: Animalia
- Phylum: Arthropoda
- Class: Insecta
- Order: Lepidoptera
- Family: Crambidae
- Genus: Elophila
- Species: E. fengwhanalis

Binomial name
- Elophila fengwhanalis (Pryer, 1877)

Synonyms
- Lepyrodes fengwhanalis Pryer, 1877; Nymphula fengwhanalis

Species of moth

Elophila fengwhanalis is a species of moth in the family Crambidae. It was described by Pryer in 1877. It is found in Japan (Hokkaido, Honshu, Shikoku, Kyushu, Tokara Islands), China and Korea.

The length of the forewings is 6.6-7.6mm for males and 6.9-9.1 mm for females.
