= Nymphula distinctalis =

Scientific classification
- Domain: Eukaryota
- Kingdom: Animalia
- Phylum: Arthropoda
- Class: Insecta
- Order: Lepidoptera
- Family: Crambidae
- Genus: Nymphula
- Species: N. distinctalis

Binomial name
- Nymphula distinctalis (Ragonot, 1894)

Synonyms
- Hydrocampa distinctalis Ragonot, 1894

Species of moth

Nymphula distinctalis is a moth in the family Crambidae. It was described by Ragonot in 1894. It is found in the Russian Far East and Japan.
