= Elophila occidentalis =

Scientific classification
- Kingdom: Animalia
- Phylum: Arthropoda
- Class: Insecta
- Order: Lepidoptera
- Family: Crambidae
- Genus: Elophila
- Species: E. occidentalis

Binomial name
- Elophila occidentalis (Lange, 1956)

Synonyms
- Synclita occidentalis Lange, 1956

Species of moth

Elophila occidentalis is a species of moth in the family Crambidae. It was described by William Harry Lange in 1956. It is found in the United States, where it has been recorded from California, Arizona and Nebraska.

The wingspan is 11–15 mm for males and 15–22 mm for females. The forewings are fuscous with rufous-and-white markings. The hindwings are fuscous with a reddish area at the base. Adults have been recorded on wing from June to September in two to three generations per year.

The larvae feed on Echinodorus cordifolius, Bacopa rotundifolia, Potamogeton gramineus, Sigittaria species, Typha californica and Jussiaea californica.
