= Elophila maralis =

Scientific classification
- Kingdom: Animalia
- Phylum: Arthropoda
- Class: Insecta
- Order: Lepidoptera
- Family: Crambidae
- Genus: Elophila
- Species: E. maralis

Binomial name
- Elophila maralis (Schaus, 1920)

Synonyms
- Symphysa maralis Schaus, 1920

Species of moth

Elophila maralis is a species of moth in the family Crambidae. It was described by Schaus in 1920. It is found in Cuba.
