= Massepha lupa =

Scientific classification
- Domain: Eukaryota
- Kingdom: Animalia
- Phylum: Arthropoda
- Class: Insecta
- Order: Lepidoptera
- Family: Crambidae
- Genus: Massepha
- Species: M. lupa

Binomial name
- Massepha lupa (H. Druce, 1899)

Synonyms
- Ceratoclasis lupa H. Druce, 1899; Pilocrocis plumbilinea Kaye, 1901

Species of moth

Massepha lupa is a moth in the family Crambidae. It was described by Herbert Druce in 1899. It is found in Honduras, Guatemala and Trinidad.
