= Massepha grisealis =

Scientific classification
- Kingdom: Animalia
- Phylum: Arthropoda
- Class: Insecta
- Order: Lepidoptera
- Family: Crambidae
- Genus: Massepha
- Species: M. grisealis

Binomial name
- Massepha grisealis Hampson, 1917

Species of moth

Massepha grisealis is a moth in the family Crambidae. It was described by George Hampson in 1917. It is found in Ghana.
