= Massepha grammalis =

Scientific classification
- Kingdom: Animalia
- Phylum: Arthropoda
- Class: Insecta
- Order: Lepidoptera
- Family: Crambidae
- Genus: Massepha
- Species: M. grammalis

Binomial name
- Massepha grammalis (Guenée, 1854)

Synonyms
- Stenia grammalis Guenée, 1854; Blepharomastix romalis Druce, 1895

Species of moth

Massepha grammalis is a moth in the family Crambidae. It was described by Achille Guenée in 1854. It is found in Panama and French Guiana.
