= Elophila atlantica =

Scientific classification
- Kingdom: Animalia
- Phylum: Arthropoda
- Class: Insecta
- Order: Lepidoptera
- Family: Crambidae
- Genus: Elophila
- Species: E. atlantica

Binomial name
- Elophila atlantica (Munroe, 1972)

Synonyms
- Synclita atlantica Munroe, 1972

Species of moth

Elophila atlantica is a species of moth in the family Crambidae. It was described by Eugene G. Munroe in 1972. It is found on North America, where it has been recorded from Nova Scotia, Florida, Maine, Maryland and South Carolina.

Adults have been recorded on wing in March and from June to August.
