= Massepha asiusalis =

Scientific classification
- Kingdom: Animalia
- Phylum: Arthropoda
- Class: Insecta
- Order: Lepidoptera
- Family: Crambidae
- Genus: Massepha
- Species: M. asiusalis

Binomial name
- Massepha asiusalis (Walker, 1859)

Synonyms
- Botys asiusalis Walker, 1859

Species of moth

Massepha asiusalis is a moth in the family Crambidae. It was described by Francis Walker in 1859. It is found in Rio de Janeiro, Brazil.
