= Elophila orientalis =

Scientific classification
- Kingdom: Animalia
- Phylum: Arthropoda
- Class: Insecta
- Order: Lepidoptera
- Family: Crambidae
- Genus: Elophila
- Species: E. orientalis

Binomial name
- Elophila orientalis (Filipjev, 1933)

Synonyms
- Nymphula orientalis Filipjev, 1933

Species of moth

Elophila orientalis is a species of moth in the family Crambidae. It was described by Nikolaj Nikolayevich Filipjev in 1933. It is found in China, Japan (Hokkaido, Honshu) and the Russian Far East (Ussuri).

The length of the forewings is 7.7-8.5 mm for males and 7.9-10.8 mm for females. The forewings are pale orange.

The larvae probably feed on Phragmites species. They create a portable case of leaf fragments. Full-grown larvae reach a length of 15–18 mm.
