= Elophila ekthlipsis =

Scientific classification
- Kingdom: Animalia
- Phylum: Arthropoda
- Class: Insecta
- Order: Lepidoptera
- Family: Crambidae
- Genus: Elophila
- Species: E. ekthlipsis

Binomial name
- Elophila ekthlipsis (Grote, 1876)

Synonyms
- Hydrocampa ekthlipsis Grote, 1876; Nymphula ekthlipsis

Species of moth

Elophila ekthlipsis, the nymphula moth, is a species of moth in the family Crambidae. It was described by Augustus Radcliffe Grote in 1876. It is found in North America, where it has been recorded from the Great Lakes area, including Indiana, Maine, Michigan, Minnesota, New Brunswick, New Hampshire, Ohio, Ontario, Quebec and Wisconsin. The habitat consists of ponds and marshes.

The wingspan is 18–26 mm. Adults are on wing from June to August. They create a portable case.
