= Aetholix indecisalis =

Scientific classification
- Kingdom: Animalia
- Phylum: Arthropoda
- Clade: Pancrustacea
- Class: Insecta
- Order: Lepidoptera
- Family: Crambidae
- Subfamily: Spilomelinae
- Tribe: Agroterini
- Genus: Aetholix
- Species: A. indecisalis

Binomial name
- Aetholix indecisalis (Warren, 1896)

Synonyms
- Metasiodes indecisalis Warren, 1896

Species of moth

Aetholix indecisalis is a moth in the family Crambidae. It was described by Warren in 1896. It is found in India (Khasias).
