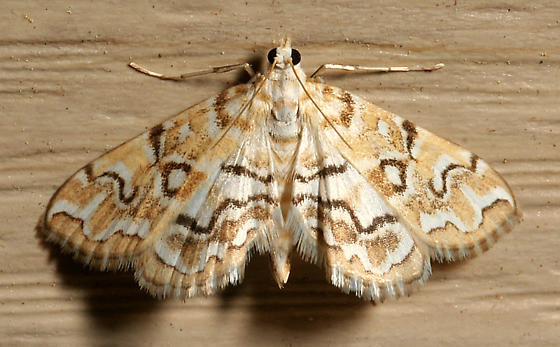

Scientific classification
- Kingdom: Animalia
- Phylum: Arthropoda
- Class: Insecta
- Order: Lepidoptera
- Family: Crambidae
- Genus: Elophila
- Species: E. icciusalis

Binomial name
- Elophila icciusalis (Walker, 1859)

Synonyms
- Munroessa icciusalis (Walker, 1859); Leucochroma icciusalis Walker, 1859; Munroessa icciusalis albiplaga Munroe, 1972; Munroessa icciusalis avalona Munroe, 1972; Hydrocampa formosalis Clemens, 1860; Hydrocampa genuialis Lederer, 1863

= Elophila icciusalis =

Species of moth

Elophila icciusalis, the pondside pyralid moth, is a species of moth of the family Crambidae. It is found in most of North America.

The wingspan is 16–26 mm. Adults are on wing from June to September.

The larvae are aquatic and feed on Menyanthes, Lemna, eelgrass, Potamogeton and Cyperaceae species.

== Subspecies ==
- Elophila icciusalis albiplaga Munroe, 1972
- Elophila icciusalis avalona Munroe, 1972
- Elophila icciusalis icciusalis
