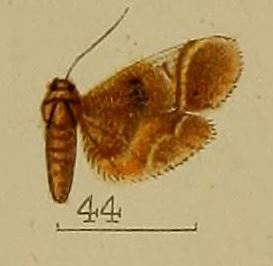
- Massepha rufescens

Scientific classification
- Kingdom: Animalia
- Phylum: Arthropoda
- Class: Insecta
- Order: Lepidoptera
- Family: Crambidae
- Genus: Massepha
- Species: M. rufescens

Binomial name
- Massepha rufescens Hampson, 1912

= Massepha rufescens =

Species of moth

Massepha rufescens is a moth in the family Crambidae. It was described by George Hampson in 1912. It is found in Tamil Nadu, India.
