= Nymphula coenosalis =

Scientific classification
- Kingdom: Animalia
- Phylum: Arthropoda
- Class: Insecta
- Order: Lepidoptera
- Family: Crambidae
- Genus: Nymphula
- Species: N. coenosalis

Binomial name
- Nymphula coenosalis (Snellen, 1895)

Synonyms
- Hydrocampa coenosalis Snellen, 1895

Species of moth

Nymphula coenosalis is a moth in the family Crambidae. It was described by Snellen in 1895. It is found on Sulawesi.
