= Nymphula expatrialis =

Scientific classification
- Domain: Eukaryota
- Kingdom: Animalia
- Phylum: Arthropoda
- Class: Insecta
- Order: Lepidoptera
- Family: Crambidae
- Genus: Nymphula
- Species: N. expatrialis

Binomial name
- Nymphula expatrialis Hampson, 1906

Species of moth

Nymphula expatrialis is a moth in the family Crambidae. It was described by George Hampson in 1906. It is found on Fergusson Island in Papua New Guinea.
