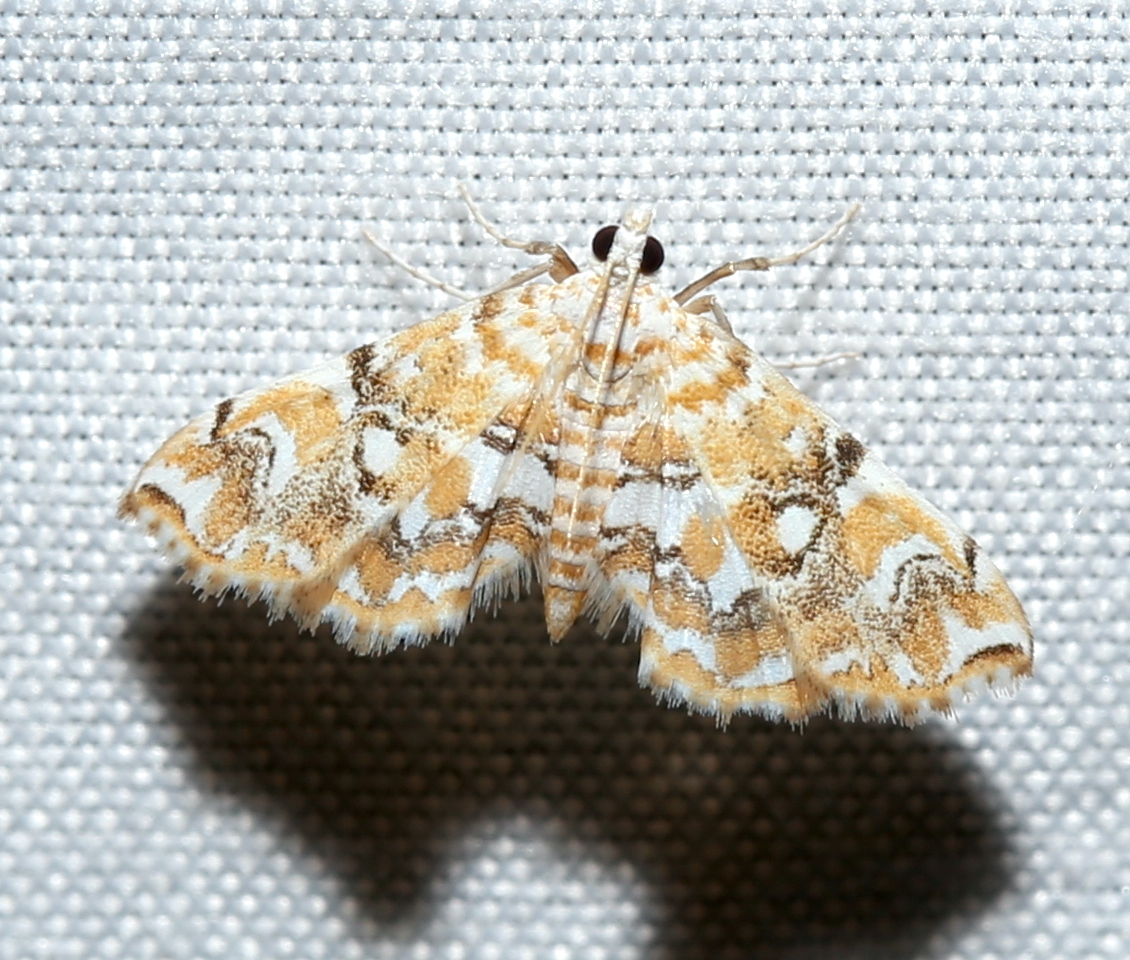

Scientific classification
- Kingdom: Animalia
- Phylum: Arthropoda
- Class: Insecta
- Order: Lepidoptera
- Family: Crambidae
- Genus: Elophila
- Species: E. faulalis

Binomial name
- Elophila faulalis (Walker, 1859)

Synonyms
- Leucochroma faulalis Walker, 1859; Munroessa faulalis; Hydrocampa pacalis Grote, 1881

= Elophila faulalis =

Species of moth

Elophila faulalis is a species of moth in the family Crambidae. It was described by Francis Walker in 1859. It is found in North America, where it has been recorded from Alabama, Florida, Maine, Maryland, Mississippi, Ohio, Ontario, Quebec and South Carolina.

Adults have been recorded nearly year round.
