= Fangalabola =

Scientific classification
- Kingdom: Animalia
- Phylum: Arthropoda
- Class: Insecta
- Order: Lepidoptera
- Family: Psychidae
- Genus: Deborrea
- Species: D. malgassa

Binomial name
- Deborrea malgassa Heylaerts, 1884

Synonyms
- Debarrea malagassa: Eriopteryx funebris (Kenrick, 1914); Deborrea argentacea Oberthür, 1909; Psyche joannisii Mabille, 1888

Species of moth

Fangalabola (Deborrea malgassa) is a species of bagworm moth native to Madagascar.

These bagworms are of significance because their pupae are harvested for human consumption in quantity.

== Biology ==
The length of the larva is 30–40 mm, length of the bag 35–55 mm, the length of the female is approximately 25 mm. It has a wingspan of 27–44 mm.

Known foodplants are: Acacia dealbata, fruit trees, Hibiscus tiliaceus, Grevillea robusta, Dombeya spp., Psidium spp., Eucalyptus spp., Cupressus lusitanica, Pinus patala and Amygdalus persica.

This species occurs throughout the year in forested biotopes with reasonable humidity.

== See also ==
- List of moths of Madagascar
