= Elophila ealensis =

Scientific classification
- Kingdom: Animalia
- Phylum: Arthropoda
- Class: Insecta
- Order: Lepidoptera
- Family: Crambidae
- Genus: Elophila
- Species: E. ealensis

Binomial name
- Elophila ealensis (Agassiz, 2012)

Synonyms
- Nymphula ealensis Agassiz, 2012

Species of moth

Elophila ealensis is a species of moth in the family Crambidae. It was described by David John Lawrence Agassiz in 2012. It is found in the Democratic Republic of the Congo.

The wingspan is about 14 mm.

== Etymology ==
The species name refers to Eala (in Tshuapa Province), the type locality.
