= Elophila palliolatalis =

Scientific classification
- Kingdom: Animalia
- Phylum: Arthropoda
- Class: Insecta
- Order: Lepidoptera
- Family: Crambidae
- Genus: Elophila
- Species: E. palliolatalis

Binomial name
- Elophila palliolatalis (C. Swinhoe, 1890)

Synonyms
- Hydrocampa palliolatalis C. Swinhoe, 1890

Species of moth

Elophila palliolatalis is a species of moth in the family Crambidae. It was described by Charles Swinhoe in 1890. It is found in Myanmar.
