= Massepha tessmanni =

Scientific classification
- Domain: Eukaryota
- Kingdom: Animalia
- Phylum: Arthropoda
- Class: Insecta
- Order: Lepidoptera
- Family: Crambidae
- Genus: Massepha
- Species: M. tessmanni

Binomial name
- Massepha tessmanni Gaede, 1917

Species of moth

Massepha tessmanni is a moth in the family Crambidae. It was described by Max Gaede in 1917. It is found in Cameroon and Equatorial Guinea.
