= Microgaster godzilla =

Scientific classification
- Kingdom: Animalia
- Phylum: Arthropoda
- Class: Insecta
- Order: Hymenoptera
- Family: Braconidae
- Genus: Microgaster
- Species: M. godzilla

Binomial name
- Microgaster godzilla Fernandez-Triana & Kamino, 2020

Species of aquatic parasitoid wasp

Microgaster godzilla is a species of aquatic parasitoid wasp from Japan. Its host is the caterpillar Elophila turbata. The wasp is named after the fictional monster Godzilla.

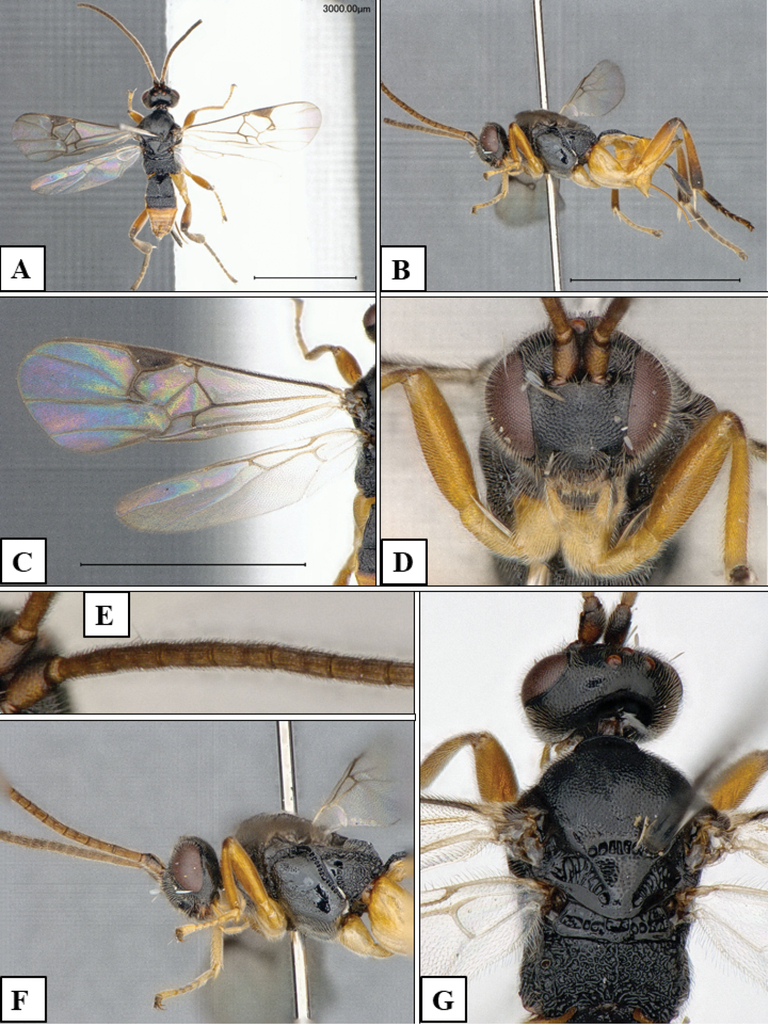
Different parts of Microgaster Godzilla including head, wing, thorax and antennae, viewed from close-up.
