= Elophila gurgitalis =

Scientific classification
- Kingdom: Animalia
- Phylum: Arthropoda
- Class: Insecta
- Order: Lepidoptera
- Family: Crambidae
- Genus: Elophila
- Species: E. gurgitalis

Binomial name
- Elophila gurgitalis (Lederer, 1863)

Synonyms
- Synclita gurgitalis Lederer, 1863; Synclita modestalis Lederer, 1863

Species of moth

Elophila gurgitalis is a species of moth in the family Crambidae. It was described by Julius Lederer in 1863. It is found in Suriname and Venezuela.
