= Nymphula corculina =

Scientific classification
- Domain: Eukaryota
- Kingdom: Animalia
- Phylum: Arthropoda
- Class: Insecta
- Order: Lepidoptera
- Family: Crambidae
- Genus: Nymphula
- Species: N. corculina

Binomial name
- Nymphula corculina (Butler, 1879)

Synonyms
- Oligostigma corculina Butler, 1879; Aulacodes nawalis Wileman, 1911

Species of moth

Nymphula corculina is a moth in the family Crambidae. It was described by Arthur Gardiner Butler in 1879. It is found in Japan (Hokkaido, Honshu) and the Russian Far East (Sakhalin, the Kuriles).

The length of the forewings is 7.4 mm for males and 8.2 mm for females.
