= Elophila manilensis =

Scientific classification
- Kingdom: Animalia
- Phylum: Arthropoda
- Class: Insecta
- Order: Lepidoptera
- Family: Crambidae
- Genus: Elophila
- Species: E. manilensis

Binomial name
- Elophila manilensis (Hampson, 1917)

Synonyms
- Nymphula manilensis Hampson, 1917

Species of moth

Elophila manilensis is a species of moth in the family Crambidae. It was described by George Hampson in 1917. It is native to eastern Asia, where it has been recorded from China and the Philippines. It is a naturalised species in aquatic nurseries in Great Britain.

The wingspan is 11–14 mm for males and 16–22 mm for females.

The larvae feed on various aquatic plants. They live entirely underwater.
