= Deborrea =

Scientific classification
- Domain: Eukaryota
- Kingdom: Animalia
- Phylum: Arthropoda
- Class: Insecta
- Order: Lepidoptera
- Family: Psychidae
- Subfamily: Oiketicinae
- Tribe: Acanthopsychini
- Genus: Deborrea; Heylaerts, 1884

Type species
- Deborrea malgassa Heylaerts, 1884

Synonyms
- Eriopteryx Kenrick, 1914

Genus of moths

Deborrea is a genus of moths of the Psychidae family.

== Species ==
- Deborrea cambouei (Oberthür, 1922)
- Deborrea griveaudi Bourgogne, 1982
- Deborrea humberti Bourgogne, 1984
- Deborrea malgassa Heylaerts, 1884
- Deborrea robinsoni Bourgogne, 1964
- Deborrea seyrigi Bourgogne, 1984
