= Elophila africalis =

Scientific classification
- Kingdom: Animalia
- Phylum: Arthropoda
- Class: Insecta
- Order: Lepidoptera
- Family: Crambidae
- Genus: Elophila
- Species: E. africalis

Binomial name
- Elophila africalis (Hampson, 1906)

Synonyms
- Parthenodes africalis Hampson, 1906; Isopteryx enixalis C. Swinhoe, 1885; Cymoriza linealis Moore, 1888; Nymphula osculatrix Meyrick, 1933

Species of moth

Elophila africalis is a species of moth in the family Crambidae. It was described by George Hampson in 1906. It is found in Angola, Benin, Botswana, Cameroon, the Democratic Republic of the Congo, Ghana, Ivory Coast, Kenya, Madagascar, Malawi, Mozambique, Namibia, Niger, Nigeria, Senegal, Sierra Leone, South Africa, Tanzania, Uganda, Zambia and Zimbabwe.

The wingspan is 12–16 mm for males and 16–22 mm for females. Adults are on wing in February and from April to November, probably in continuous generations.

The larvae feed on Azolla and Vossia species.
