= Nymphula fuscomarginalis =

Scientific classification
- Domain: Eukaryota
- Kingdom: Animalia
- Phylum: Arthropoda
- Class: Insecta
- Order: Lepidoptera
- Family: Crambidae
- Genus: Nymphula
- Species: N. fuscomarginalis

Binomial name
- Nymphula fuscomarginalis Bremer & Grey, 1853

Species of moth

Nymphula fuscomarginalis is a moth in the family Crambidae. It was described by Otto Vasilievich Bremer and William Grey in 1852. It is found in China.
