= Elophila interruptalis =

Scientific classification
- Kingdom: Animalia
- Phylum: Arthropoda
- Class: Insecta
- Order: Lepidoptera
- Family: Crambidae
- Genus: Elophila
- Species: E. interruptalis

Binomial name
- Elophila interruptalis (Pryer, 1877)

Synonyms
- Hydrocampa interruptalis Pryer, 1877; Nymphula interruptalis; Nymphula benesignata Caradja, 1925

Species of moth

Elophila interruptalis is a species of moth in the family Crambidae. It was described by Pryer in 1877. It is found in Japan (Honshu, Shikoku, Kyushu), China and Korea.

The ground colour of the forewings is pale orange. Adults are on wing from June to November in two to three generations per year.

The larvae are polyphagous on aquatic plants, including water lilies such as Nymphaeaceae. Young larvae mine the leaves of their host plant. It eats and kills the central bud of the shoot of the water caltrop Trapa natans, an important crop in China, killing it and stopping growth.
