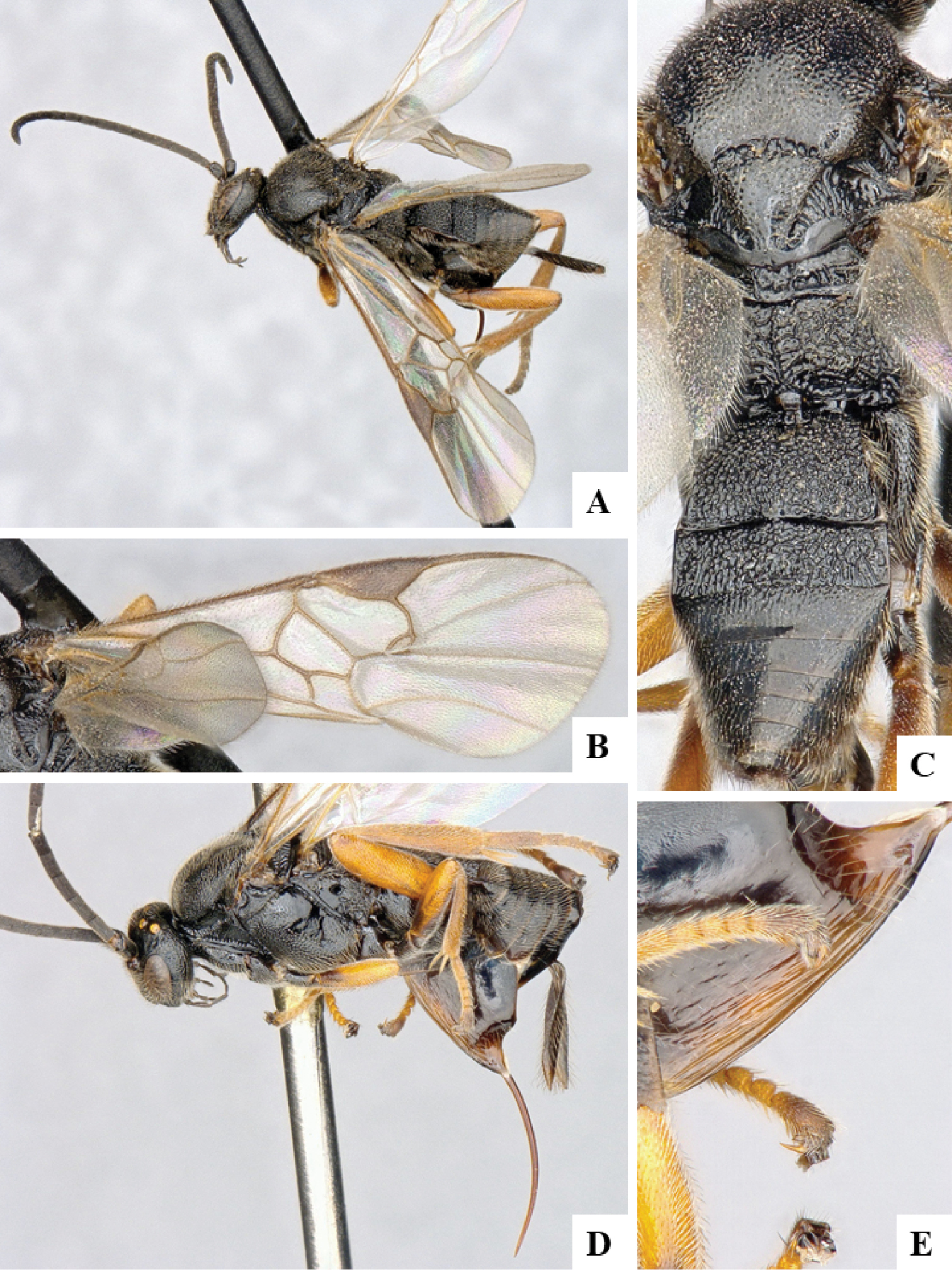
- Microgaster deductor

Scientific classification
- Kingdom: Animalia
- Phylum: Arthropoda
- Class: Insecta
- Order: Hymenoptera
- Family: Braconidae
- Subfamily: Microgastrinae
- Genus: Microgaster; Latreille, 1804

Diversity
- more than 100 species

= Microgaster =

Genus of wasps

Microgaster is a genus of wasp in the family Braconidae. There are more than 100 described species in Microgaster, found throughout most of the world.

== See also ==
- List of Microgaster species
