= Aetholix meropalis =

Scientific classification
- Kingdom: Animalia
- Phylum: Arthropoda
- Clade: Pancrustacea
- Class: Insecta
- Order: Lepidoptera
- Family: Crambidae
- Subfamily: Spilomelinae
- Tribe: Agroterini
- Genus: Aetholix
- Species: A. meropalis

Binomial name
- Aetholix meropalis (Walker, 1859)

Synonyms
- Hydrocampa meropalis Walker, 1859; Nymphula meropalis; Hydrocampa actoralis Walker, 1859

Species of moth

Aetholix meropalis is a moth in the family Crambidae. It was described by Francis Walker in 1859. It is found on Borneo.
