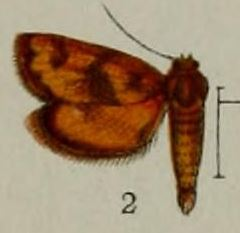

Scientific classification
- Kingdom: Animalia
- Phylum: Arthropoda
- Class: Insecta
- Order: Lepidoptera
- Family: Crambidae
- Genus: Elophila
- Species: E. fulvalis

Binomial name
- Elophila fulvalis (Hampson, 1899)

Synonyms
- Massepha fulvalis Hampson, 1899

= Elophila fulvalis =

Species of moth

Elophila fulvalis is a species of moth in the family Crambidae. It was described by George Hampson in 1899. It is found in South America, where it has been recorded from Paraná, Brazil.
