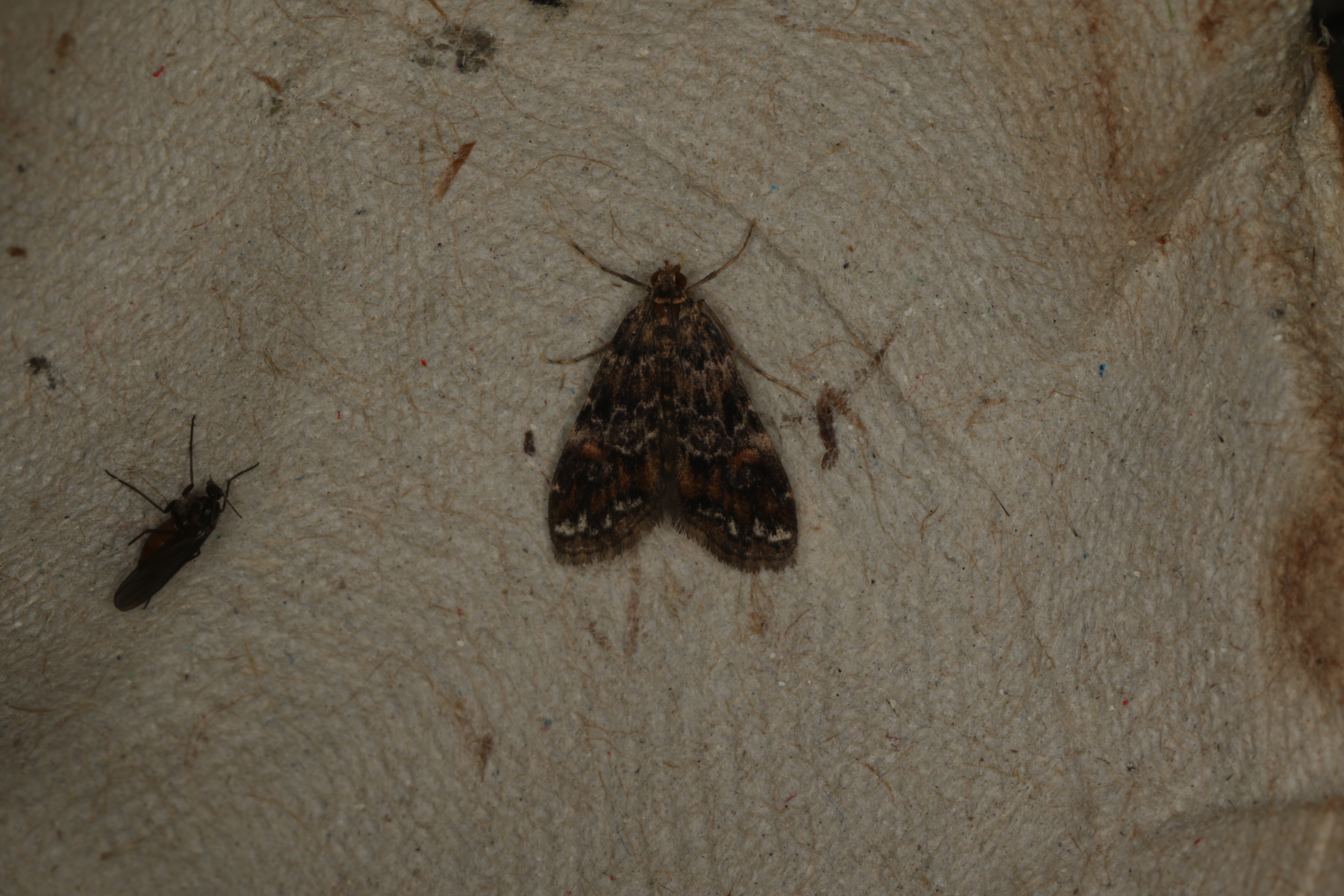

Scientific classification
- Kingdom: Animalia
- Phylum: Arthropoda
- Class: Insecta
- Order: Lepidoptera
- Family: Crambidae
- Genus: Elophila
- Species: E. responsalis

Binomial name
- Elophila responsalis (Walker, 1866)

Synonyms
- Diasemia responsalis Walker, 1866; Oligostigma responsalis; Paraponyx marmorea Meyrick, 1885

= Elophila responsalis =

Species of moth

Elophila responsalis is a species of moth in the family Crambidae. It was described by Francis Walker in 1866. It is found in Australia, where it has been recorded from Queensland.

The wingspan is about 20 mm. There is a pattern of brown, white and yellow on the wings.
