= Elophila feili =

Scientific classification
- Kingdom: Animalia
- Phylum: Arthropoda
- Clade: Pancrustacea
- Class: Insecta
- Order: Lepidoptera
- Family: Crambidae
- Genus: Elophila
- Species: E. feili

Binomial name
- Elophila feili Speidel, 2002

Species of moth

Elophila feili is a species of moth in the family Crambidae described by Wolfgang Speidel in 2002. It can be found in Spain and Portugal.

The wingspan is 18–25 millimetres (0.71–0.98 in). Adults are on wing in May and from August to September, probably in two generations per year.
