= Aetholix litanalis =

Scientific classification
- Kingdom: Animalia
- Phylum: Arthropoda
- Clade: Pancrustacea
- Class: Insecta
- Order: Lepidoptera
- Family: Crambidae
- Subfamily: Spilomelinae
- Tribe: Agroterini
- Genus: Aetholix
- Species: A. litanalis

Binomial name
- Aetholix litanalis (Walker, 1859)

Synonyms
- Botys litanalis Walker, 1859; Nymphula litanalis; Endotricha stenialis Warren, 1891; Botys titanalis Hampson, 1897

Species of moth

Aetholix litanalis is a moth in the family Crambidae. It was described by Francis Walker in 1859. It is found on Borneo.

The wingspan is about 11 mm. The wings are dark fawn, dusted with paler. There is a paler line near the base and a pale lunule at the end of the cell, as well as pale darker-edged spot midway between them. The subterminal line is pale and there are three pale, dark-edged lunular marks on the costa. The hindwings have faint traces of a central and submarginal paler line.
