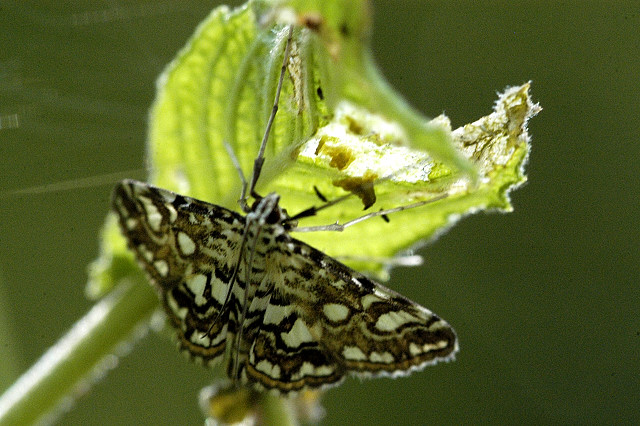

Scientific classification
- Kingdom: Animalia
- Phylum: Arthropoda
- Class: Insecta
- Order: Lepidoptera
- Family: Crambidae
- Genus: Elophila
- Species: E. nymphaeata

Binomial name
- Elophila nymphaeata (Linnaeus, 1758)

Synonyms
- Phalaena (Geometra) nymphaeata Linnaeus, 1758; Nymphula nymphaeata auralis Osthelder, 1935; Elophila interruptalis ezoensis Yoshiyasu, 1985; Nymphula nymphaeata hederalis Amsel, 1935; Hydrocampa algiralis Guenée, 1849; Hydrocampa nigra Foucart, 1876; Hydrocampa obscuralis Selys-Longchamps, 1845; Hydrocampa nymphaealis Denis & Schiffermüller, 1775; Nymphula latifaseata Rothschild, 1921; Nymphula latifasciata Klima, 1937; Nymphula nymphaeata f. reducta Lattin, 1958; Nymphula sordidior Rothschild, 1921; Nymphula umbrata Meder, 1934; Phalaena (Geometra) potamogata Linnaeus, 1758; Hydrocampa potamogetalis Reutti, 1898; Hydrocampa potamogalis Denis & Schiffermüller, 1775; Phalaena nympheata Hufnagel, 1767; Phalaena rivulata Scopoli, 1763; Elophila nymphaeata silarigla (Speidel, 1984)

= Elophila nymphaeata =

Brown china mark

Species of moth

Elophila nymphaeata, the brown china mark, is a species of moth of the family Crambidae. It was described by Carl Linnaeus in his 1758 10th edition of Systema Naturae.

== Distribution ==
It is found in Europe and across the Palearctic to the Russian Far East and China. The moth is notable as its larva, like most members of the crambid subfamily Acentropinae, is aquatic and has tracheal gills.

== Description ==
The wingspan is 16–20 mm. The forewings vary from yellow-ochreous to rather dark fuscous; basal area with dentate white and dark fuscous lines; a white subcostal spot before first line; lines whitish, obscure, dark-margined, first angulated above middle, second with deep abrupt sinuation inwards below middle; median band almost occupied by three white dark edged blotches; an irregular interrupted white dark-edged and dark-veined subterminal streak. Hindwings as forewings, but base white, median band white except discal spot, second lineless sinuate. The larva is light brownish; dorsal line darker; head light brown; plate of 2 black-edged. In flat oval floating cases of leaf-fragments, on Potamogeton, Hydrocharis, Sparganium, etc. See also Parsons et al.

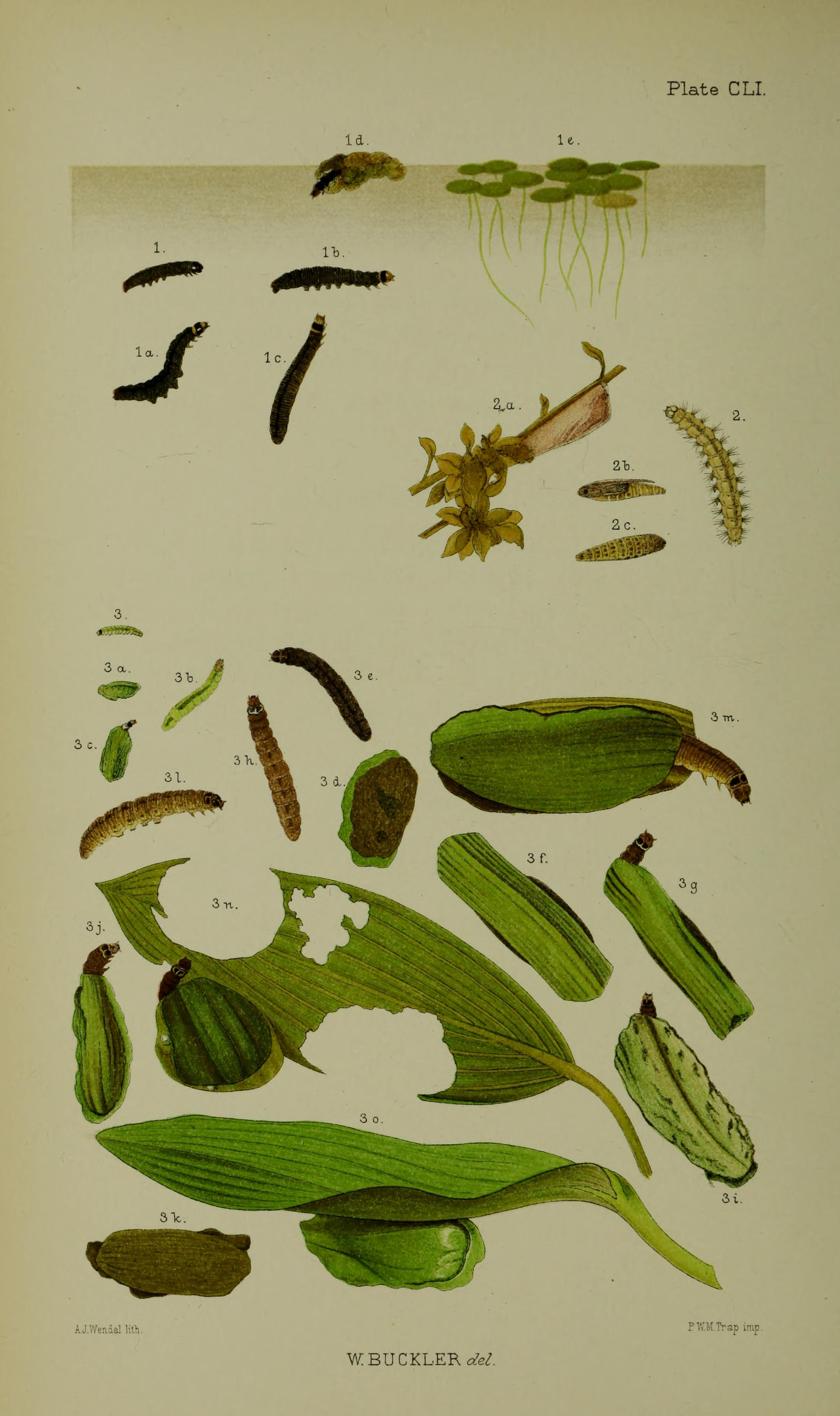
Figs 3, 3b, 3e, 3h, 3l larvae in various stages of growth; 3a, 3c, 3d, 3f, 3g, 3i, 3j,3k,3 m, 3n, 3o cases with larvae in various stages of growthon floating water plants (Potamogeton natans, Alisma plantago, Sparganium simplex, Myosotis palustris)

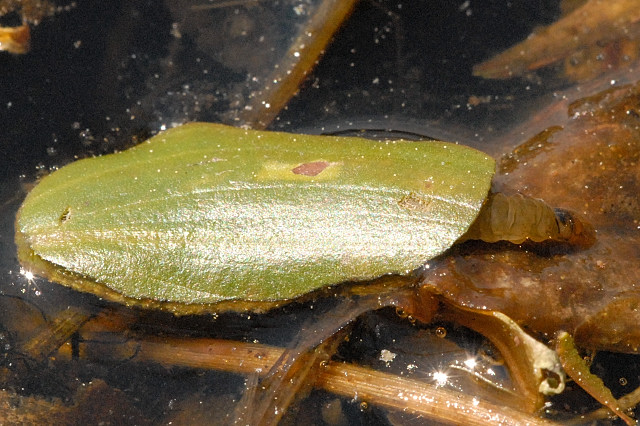
Caterpillar

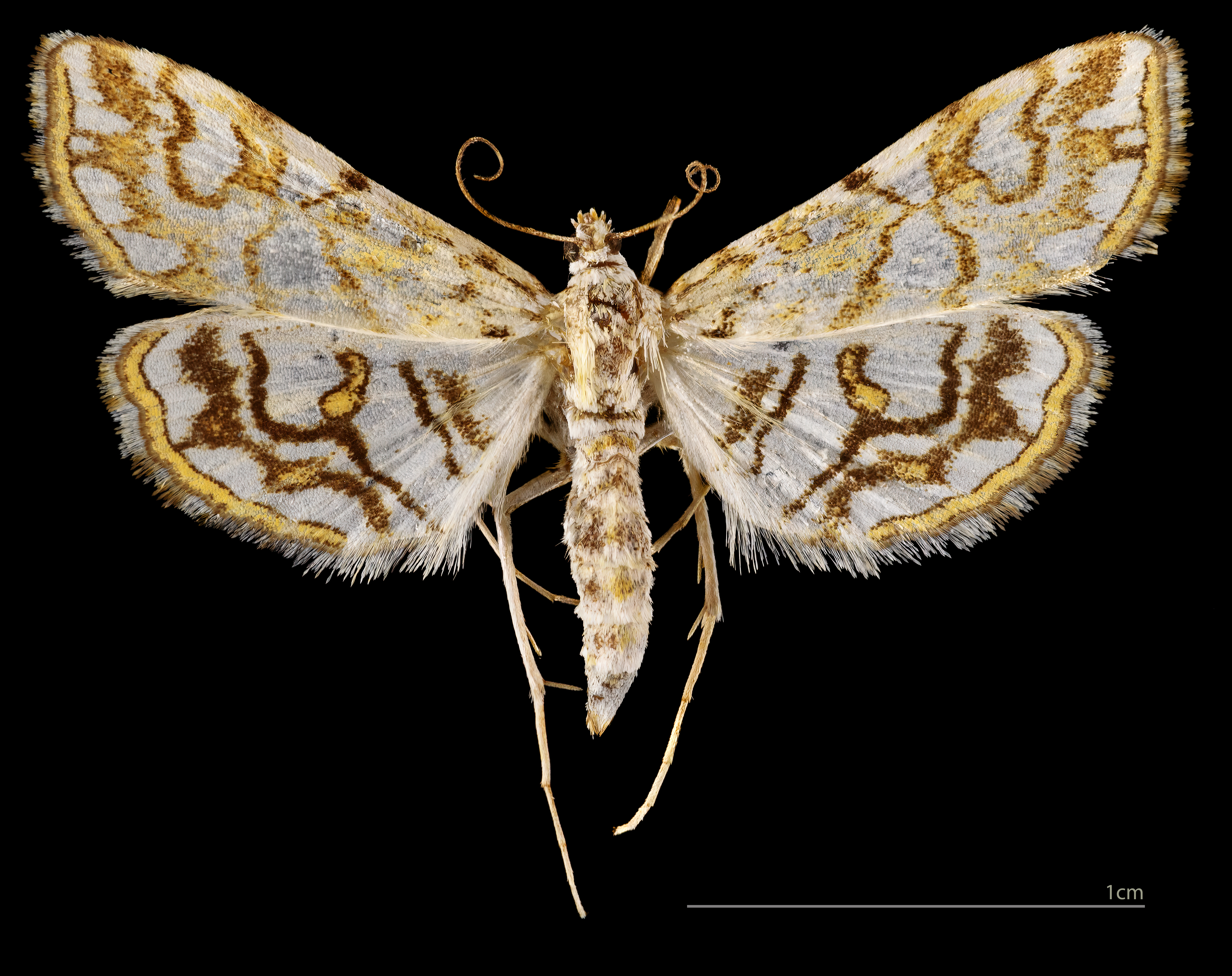
♂

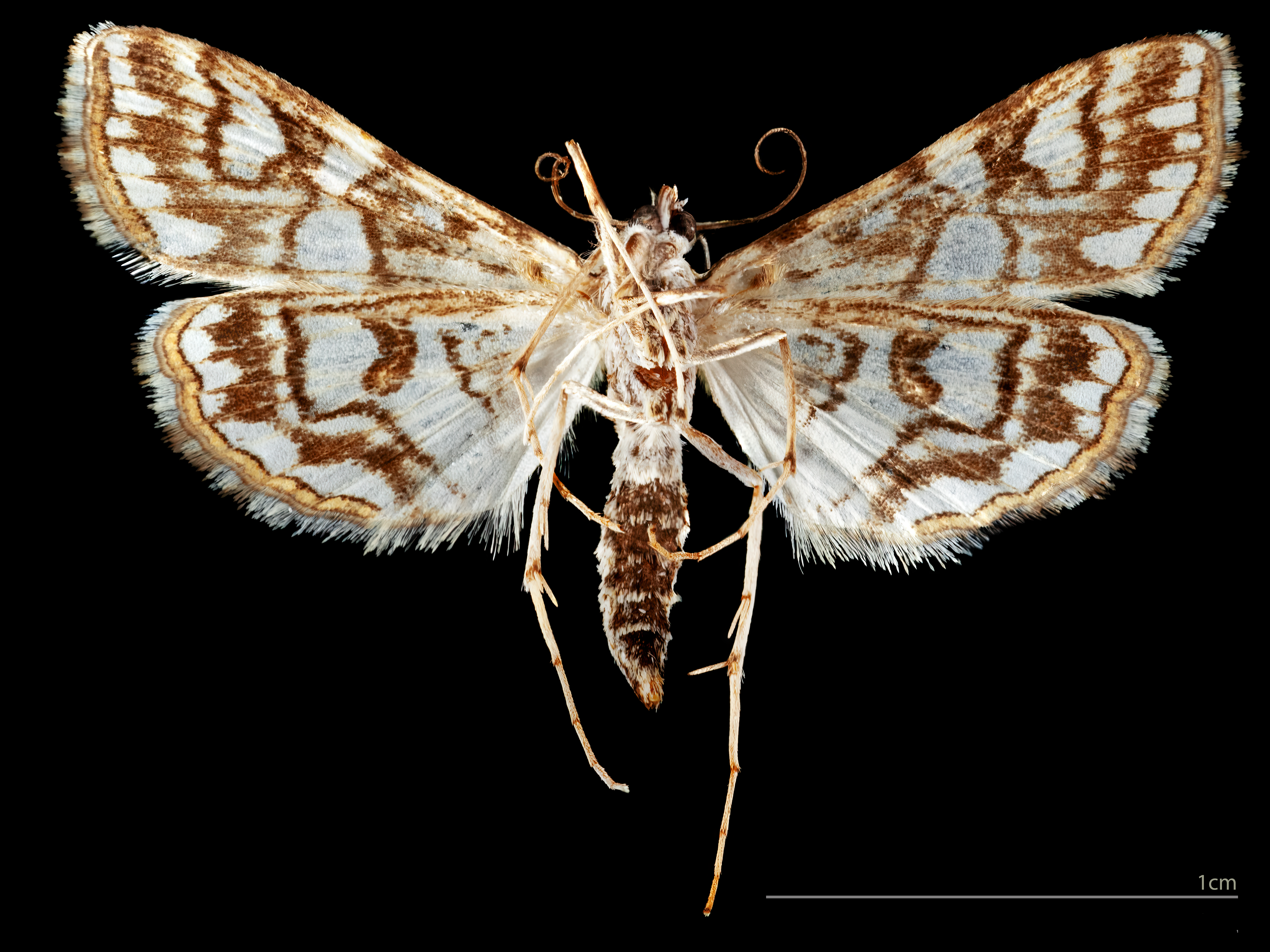
♂ △

== Biology ==
The moth flies from May to September depending on the location.

The larvae feed on Potamogeton, Nymphaeaceae and Nuphar lutea.

== Subspecies ==
- Elophila nymphaeata nymphaeata
- Elophila nymphaeata silarigla Speidel, 1984 (Algeria and Morocco)
