= Elophila sinicalis =

Scientific classification
- Kingdom: Animalia
- Phylum: Arthropoda
- Class: Insecta
- Order: Lepidoptera
- Family: Crambidae
- Genus: Elophila
- Species: E. sinicalis

Binomial name
- Elophila sinicalis (Hampson, 1897)

Synonyms
- Nymphula sinicalis Hampson, 1897

Species of moth

Elophila sinicalis is a species of moth in the family Crambidae. It was described by George Hampson in 1897. It is found in Japan on Honshu, Kyushu and the Gotō Islands, in China and Korea.

The length of the forewings is 7.3–8.3 mm for males and 7.5–8.7 mm for females.

Full-grown larvae reach a length of 12–16 mm.
