= Jean Bourgogne =

French entomologist

Jean Bourgogne was a French entomologist. He was born on 14 February 1903 in Marseille and died on 10 March 1999 in Neuilly-sur-Seine.

In 1936 he began to work in the entomology laboratory of the Muséum national d'histoire naturelle of Paris. He became a member of the Société entomologique de France in 1935. He specialized in the study of the Lepidoptera Psychidae. In 1959 he created the entomological publication Alexanor. He published 221 works. He donated his collection to the entomology laboratory of the Muséum national d'histoire naturelle of Paris.

== Species named after Jean Bourgogne ==
- Agrilus bourgognei Descarpentries & Villiers, 1963
- Antiophlebia bourgognei Laporte, 1975
- Apisa bourgognei Kiriakoff, 1952
- Bergeria bourgognei Kiriakoff, 1952
- Catoptria conchella bourgognei Leraut, 2001
- Elophila bourgognei Leraut, 2001
- Metasia cuencalis bourgognei Leraut, 2001
- Pyrgus bourgognei Picard, 1948
- Roseala bourgognei Viette, 1950
- Sericochroa bourgognei Thiaucourt, 2003

== List of taxa described ==
The list of 74 new names which he created is published on the web.
