= Coleothrix =

Scientific classification
- Domain: Eukaryota
- Kingdom: Animalia
- Phylum: Arthropoda
- Class: Insecta
- Order: Lepidoptera
- Family: Pyralidae
- Subfamily: Phycitinae
- Genus: Coleothrix; Ragonot, 1888

Genus of moths

Coleothrix is a genus of snout moths in the subfamily Phycitinae. It was described by Ragonot in 1888.

== Taxonomy ==
Coleothrix has been listed as a synonym of Addyme by Walley in 1970, but considered as a valid name by Roesler & Küppers in 1979.

== Species ==
- Coleothrix crassitibiella Ragonot, 1888
- Coleothrix longicosta Du, Song and Wu, 2007
- Coleothrix obscuriella (Inoue, 1959)
- Coleothrix swinhoeella (Ragonot, 1893)
