= Coleothrix longicosta =

Scientific classification
- Domain: Eukaryota
- Kingdom: Animalia
- Phylum: Arthropoda
- Class: Insecta
- Order: Lepidoptera
- Family: Pyralidae
- Genus: Coleothrix
- Species: C. longicosta

Binomial name
- Coleothrix longicosta Du, Song and Wu, 2007

Species of moth

Coleothrix longicosta is a species of snout moth in the genus Coleothrix. It was described by Yanli Du, Shimei Song and Chunsheng Wu in 2007. It is found in China (Zhejiang, Hubei, Hunan, Jiangxi, Fujian, Sichuan, Guangxi, Guizhou, Yunan, Hainan), Japan, Burma, India, Sri Lanka, Borneo, Malaysia, Sumatra, Bali, Sulawesi and the Philippines.

The wingspan is 15-16.5 mm.

== Etymology ==
The specific name refers to the long costa in male genitalia.
