= Addyme confusalis =

Scientific classification
- Kingdom: Animalia
- Phylum: Arthropoda
- Clade: Pancrustacea
- Class: Insecta
- Order: Lepidoptera
- Family: Pyralidae
- Genus: Addyme
- Species: A. confusalis

Binomial name
- Addyme confusalis Yamanaka, 2006

Species of moth

Addyme confusalis is a species of snout moth in the genus Addyme. It was described by Hiroshi Yamanaka in 2006 and is known from Japan.

The wingspan is 9–11 millimetres (0.35–0.43 in).
