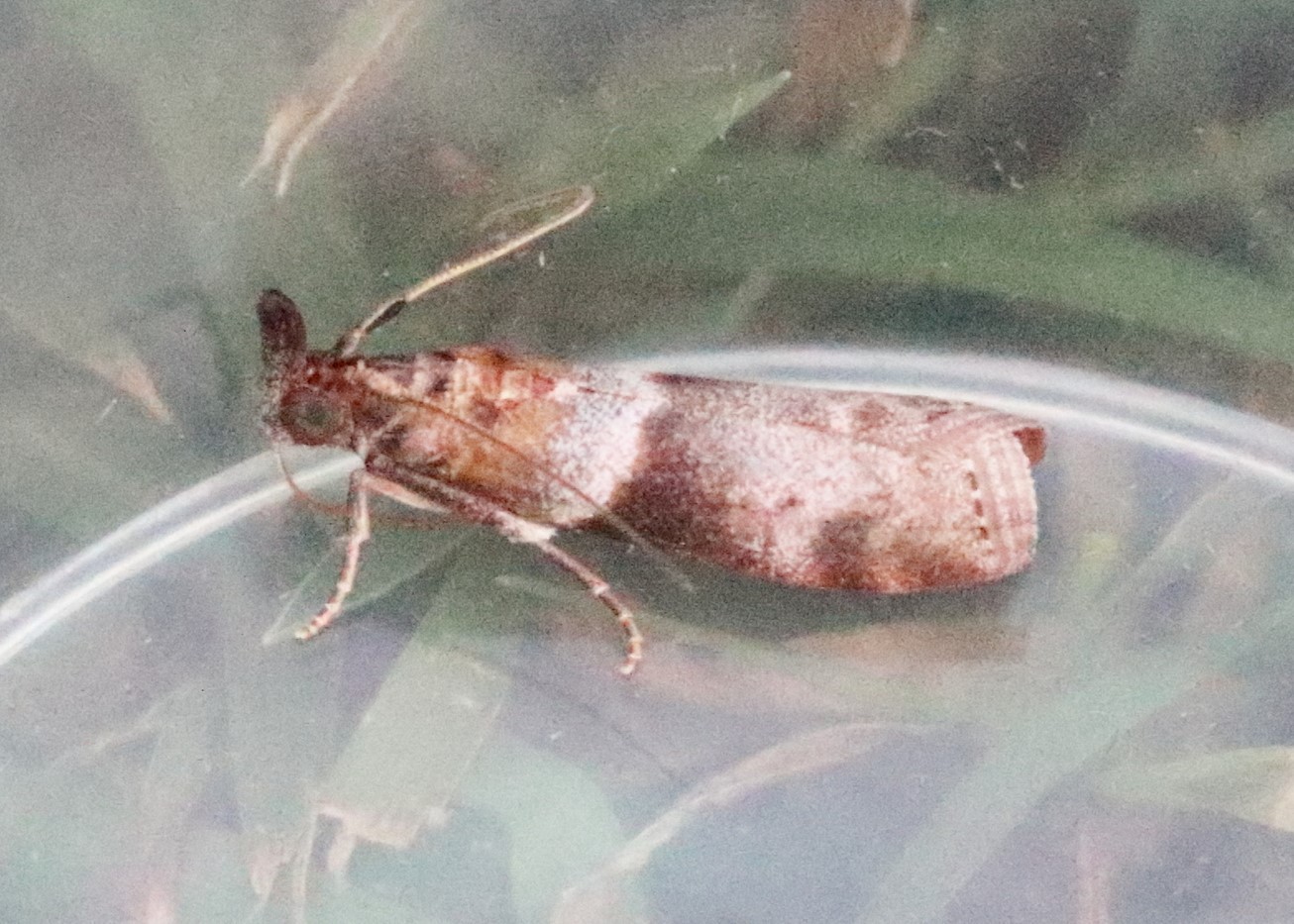

Scientific classification
- Kingdom: Animalia
- Phylum: Arthropoda
- Clade: Pancrustacea
- Class: Insecta
- Order: Lepidoptera
- Family: Pyralidae
- Genus: Addyme
- Species: A. ferrorubella

Binomial name
- Addyme ferrorubella (Walker, 1864)

Synonyms
- Cryptolechia ferrorubella Walker, 1864; Euzophera pyrrhoptera Lower, 1896; Addyme ardentella Hampson, 1901

= Addyme ferrorubella =

Species of moth

Addyme ferrorubella is a species of snout moth. It is found in Australia.
