= Coleothrix crassitibiella =

Scientific classification
- Domain: Eukaryota
- Kingdom: Animalia
- Phylum: Arthropoda
- Class: Insecta
- Order: Lepidoptera
- Family: Pyralidae
- Genus: Coleothrix
- Species: C. crassitibiella

Binomial name
- Coleothrix crassitibiella Ragonot, 1888

Synonyms
- Addyme crassitibiella

Species of moth

Coleothrix crassitibiella is a species of snout moth in the genus Coleothrix. It was described by Ragonot in 1888. It is found in China (Hainan), Borneo and Sumatra.
