= Addyme werkodara =

Scientific classification
- Kingdom: Animalia
- Phylum: Arthropoda
- Clade: Pancrustacea
- Class: Insecta
- Order: Lepidoptera
- Family: Pyralidae
- Genus: Addyme
- Species: A. werkodara

Binomial name
- Addyme werkodara Roesler & Küppers, 1979

Species of moth

Addyme werkodara is a species of snout moth in the genus Addyme. It was described by Roesler and Küppers, in 1979, and is known from Sumatra, Indonesia.
