= Coleothrix obscuriella =

Scientific classification
- Kingdom: Animalia
- Phylum: Arthropoda
- Class: Insecta
- Order: Lepidoptera
- Family: Pyralidae
- Genus: Coleothrix
- Species: C. obscuriella

Binomial name
- Coleothrix obscuriella (Inoue, 1959)

Synonyms
- Nephopterix obscuriella Inoue, 1959; Calguia obscuriella

Species of moth

Coleothrix obscuriella is a species of snout moth in the genus Coleothrix. It was described by Hiroshi Inoue in 1959. It is found in China (Hainan), Taiwan and Japan.
