= Coleothrix swinhoeella =

Scientific classification
- Domain: Eukaryota
- Kingdom: Animalia
- Phylum: Arthropoda
- Class: Insecta
- Order: Lepidoptera
- Family: Pyralidae
- Genus: Coleothrix
- Species: C. swinhoeella

Binomial name
- Coleothrix swinhoeella (Ragonot, 1893)

Synonyms
- Palibothra swinhoeella Ragonot, 1893

Species of moth

Coleothrix swinhoeella is a species of snout moth in the genus Coleothrix. It was described by Ragonot in 1888. It is found in Taiwan, Burma, India, Sri Lanka, Borneo, Malaysia, Sumatra, Bali, Sulawesi, the Philippines and the New Hebrides.
