= Addyme aspiciella =

Scientific classification
- Domain: Eukaryota
- Kingdom: Animalia
- Phylum: Arthropoda
- Class: Insecta
- Order: Lepidoptera
- Family: Pyralidae
- Genus: Addyme
- Species: A. aspiciella

Binomial name
- Addyme aspiciella (Ragonot, 1889)

Synonyms
- Sigmarthria aspiciella Ragonot, 1889; Cabragus aspiciella Ragonot, 1893; Calguia aspiciella Shibuya, 1928

Species of moth

Addyme aspiciella is a moth of the family Pyralidae first described by Émile Louis Ragonot in 1889. It is found in Sri Lanka.
