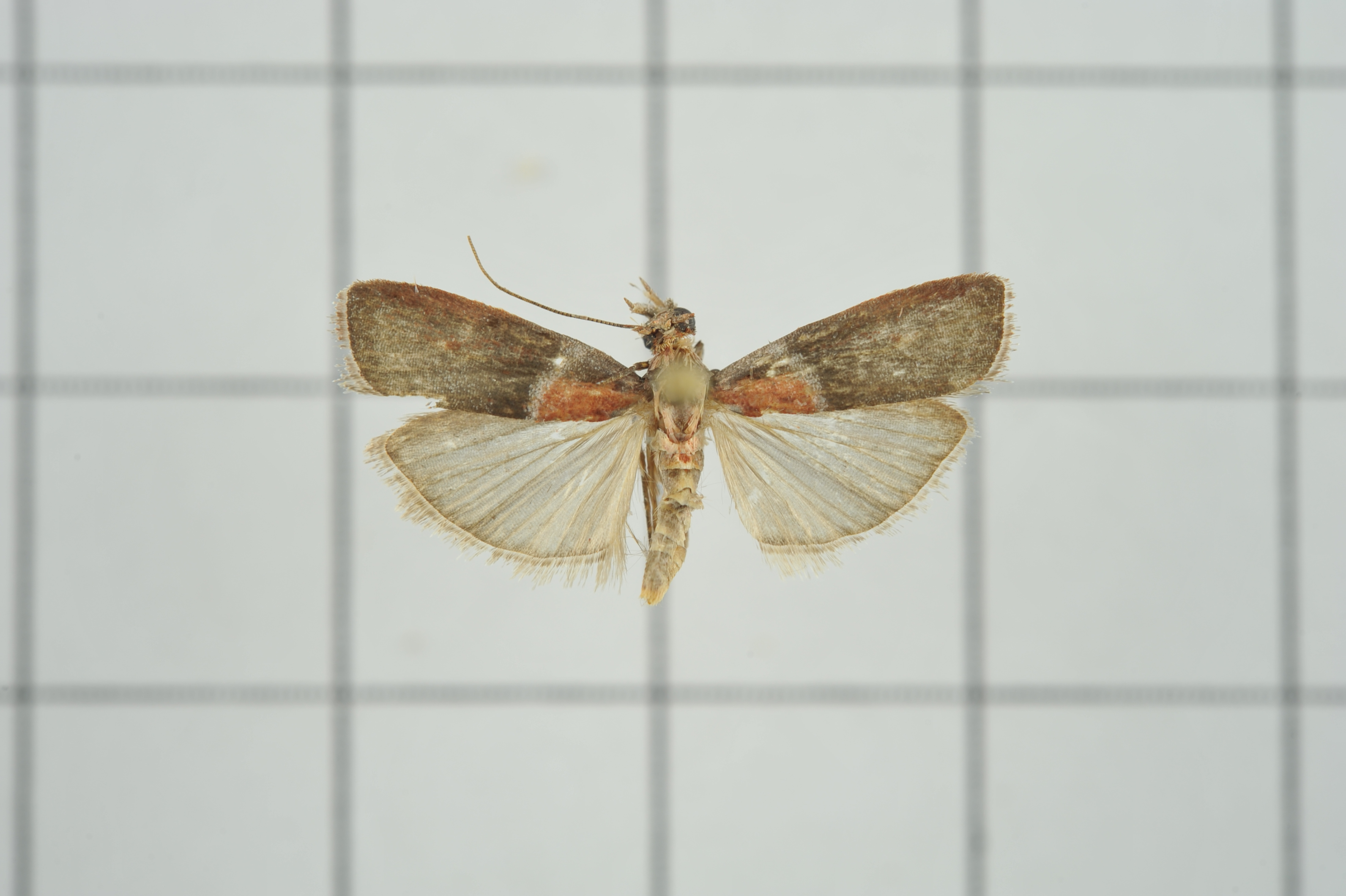

Scientific classification
- Kingdom: Animalia
- Phylum: Arthropoda
- Clade: Pancrustacea
- Class: Insecta
- Order: Lepidoptera
- Family: Pyralidae
- Genus: Addyme
- Species: A. inductalis

Binomial name
- Addyme inductalis (Walker, 1863)

Synonyms
- Acrobasis inductalis Walker, 1863; Addyme occultans Walker, 1863; Hypochalcia inferalis Walker, 1863

= Addyme inductalis =

Species of moth

Addyme inductalis is a species of snout moth in the genus Addyme. It was described by Francis Walker in 1863. It is found in Taiwan, Japan, India, Sri Lanka, Borneo, Sumatra, Sulawesi and Australia.
