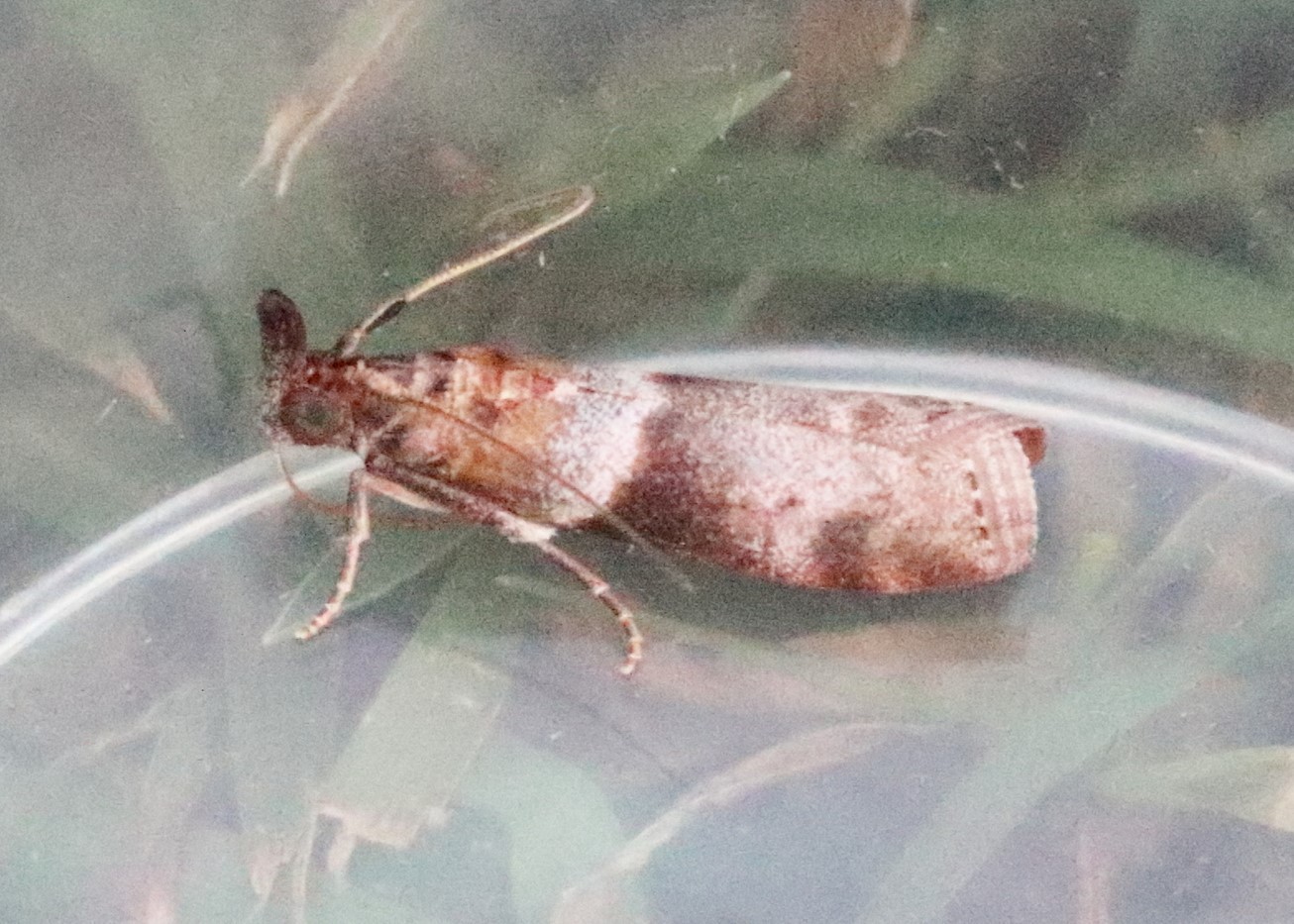
- Addyme ferrorubella

Scientific classification
- Kingdom: Animalia
- Phylum: Arthropoda
- Clade: Pancrustacea
- Class: Insecta
- Order: Lepidoptera
- Family: Pyralidae
- Tribe: Phycitini
- Genus: Addyme; Walker, 1863

= Addyme =

Genus of moths

Addyme is a genus of snout moths in the subfamily Phycitinae. It was described by Francis Walker in 1863, and is known from Japan, Indonesia, Sri Lanka and Borneo.

== Species ==
- Addyme aspiciella Ragonot, 1889
- Addyme confusalis Yamanaka, 2006
- Addyme ferrorubella (Walker, 1864)
- Addyme inductalis (Walker, 1863)
- Addyme werkodara Roesler & Küppers, 1979
