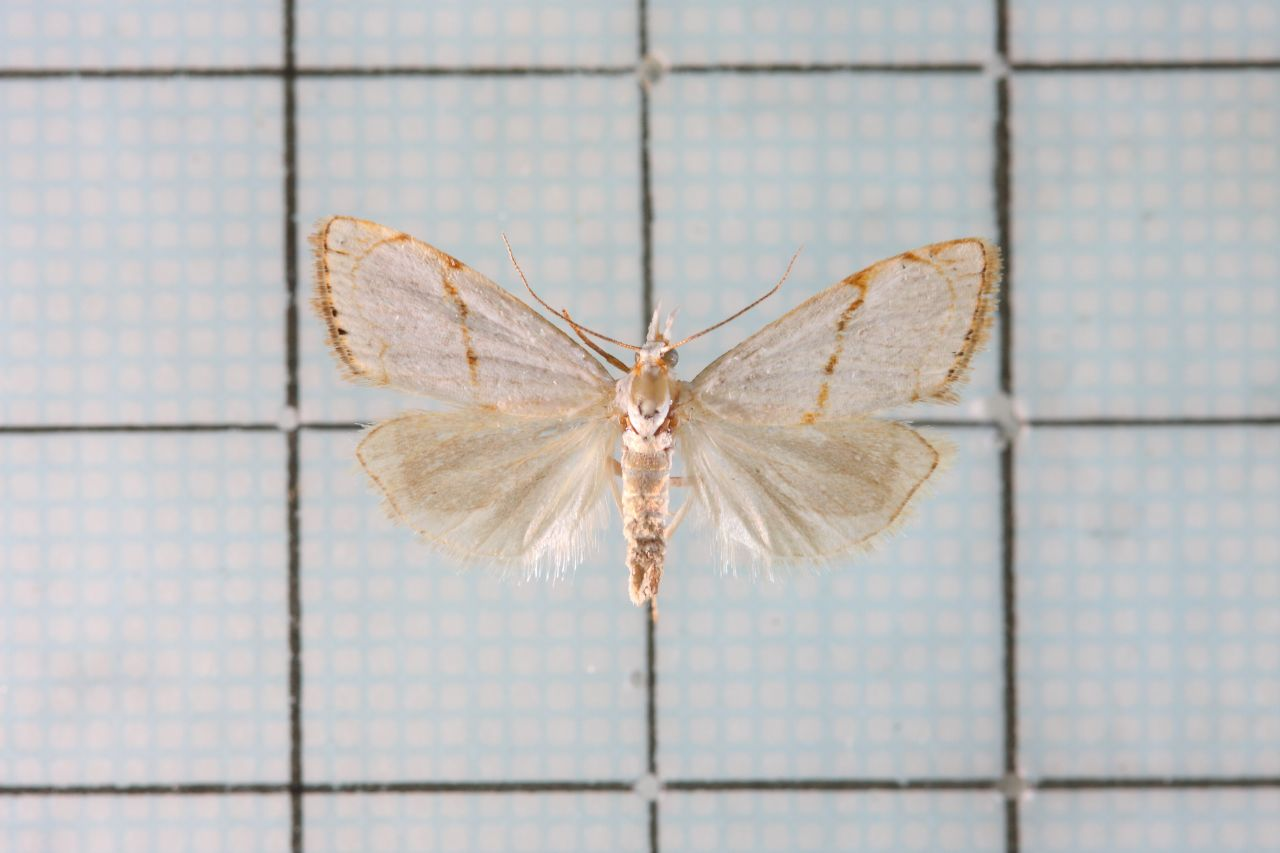
- Specimen of a Pseudargyria sp.

Scientific classification
- Domain: Eukaryota
- Kingdom: Animalia
- Phylum: Arthropoda
- Class: Insecta
- Order: Lepidoptera
- Family: Crambidae
- Subfamily: Crambinae
- Tribe: incertae sedis
- Genus: Pseudargyria; Okano, 1962

= Pseudargyria =

Genus of moths

Pseudargyria is a genus of moths of the family Crambidae.

== Species ==
- Pseudargyria acuta Song & Chen in Chen, Song & Yuan, 2003
- Pseudargyria interruptella (Walker, 1866)
- Pseudargyria marginepunctalis (Hampson, 1896)
- Pseudargyria parallelus (Zeller, 1867)
