= Pseudargyria marginepunctalis =

Scientific classification
- Kingdom: Animalia
- Phylum: Arthropoda
- Class: Insecta
- Order: Lepidoptera
- Family: Crambidae
- Subfamily: Crambinae
- Tribe: incertae sedis
- Genus: Pseudargyria
- Species: P. marginepunctalis

Binomial name
- Pseudargyria marginepunctalis (Hampson, 1896)

Synonyms
- Platytes marginepunctalis Hampson, 1896

Species of moth

Pseudargyria marginepunctalis is a moth in the family Crambidae. It was described by George Hampson in 1896. It is found in the Punjab region of what was British India.
