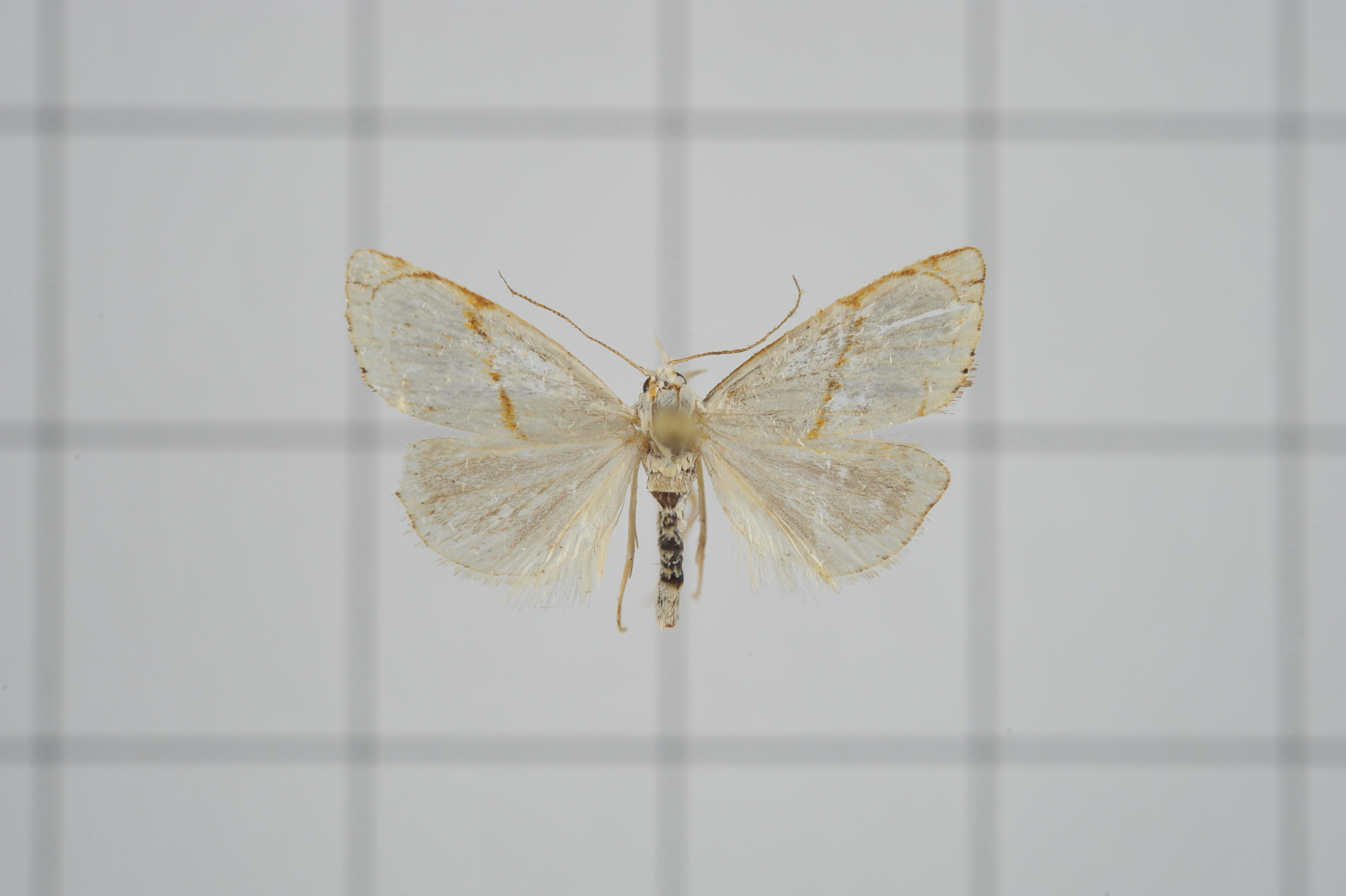
- Pseudargyria interruptella

Scientific classification
- Kingdom: Animalia
- Phylum: Arthropoda
- Class: Insecta
- Order: Lepidoptera
- Family: Crambidae
- Subfamily: Crambinae
- Tribe: incertae sedis
- Genus: Pseudargyria
- Species: P. interruptella

Binomial name
- Pseudargyria interruptella (Walker, 1866)

Synonyms
- Argyria interruptella Walker, 1866; Argyria candida Butler, 1881; Argyria inficitella Walker, 1866; Argyria obliquella Zeller, 1877; Crambus centralis Suzuki, 1915

= Pseudargyria interruptella =

Species of moth

Pseudargyria interruptella is a moth in the family Crambidae. It was described by Francis Walker in 1866.

== Distribution ==
It is found in China and Japan.
