= Pseudargyria parallelus =

Scientific classification
- Kingdom: Animalia
- Phylum: Arthropoda
- Clade: Pancrustacea
- Class: Insecta
- Order: Lepidoptera
- Family: Crambidae
- Subfamily: Crambinae
- Tribe: incertae sedis
- Genus: Pseudargyria
- Species: P. parallelus

Binomial name
- Pseudargyria parallelus (Zeller, 1867)

Synonyms
- Crambus parallelus Zeller, 1867; Platytes paralellus Hampson, 1896

Species of moth

Pseudargyria parallelus is a moth in the family Crambidae. It was described by Zeller in 1867. It is found in India (Darjeeling).
