= Pseudargyria acuta =

Scientific classification
- Kingdom: Animalia
- Phylum: Arthropoda
- Clade: Pancrustacea
- Class: Insecta
- Order: Lepidoptera
- Family: Crambidae
- Subfamily: Crambinae
- Tribe: incertae sedis
- Genus: Pseudargyria
- Species: P. acuta

Binomial name
- Pseudargyria acuta Song & Chen in Chen, Song & Yuan, 2003

Species of moth

Pseudargyria acuta is a moth in the family Crambidae. It was described by Shi-Mei Song and Tie-Mei Chen in 2003. It is found in Xizang, China.
