= Glyphodes parallelalis =

Scientific classification
- Kingdom: Animalia
- Phylum: Arthropoda
- Clade: Pancrustacea
- Class: Insecta
- Order: Lepidoptera
- Family: Crambidae
- Genus: Glyphodes
- Species: G. parallelalis

Binomial name
- Glyphodes parallelalis Gaede, 1917

Species of moth

Glyphodes parallelalis is a moth of the family Crambidae. It was described by Max Gaede in 1917 and it is native to Togo. This species has a wingspan of 21 mm and its colouration is similar to Glyphodes xanthostola Hampson, 1910.
