= Glyphodes bitriangulalis =

Scientific classification
- Kingdom: Animalia
- Phylum: Arthropoda
- Clade: Pancrustacea
- Class: Insecta
- Order: Lepidoptera
- Family: Crambidae
- Genus: Glyphodes
- Species: G. bitriangulalis

Binomial name
- Glyphodes bitriangulalis Gaede, 1917

Species of moth

Glyphodes bitriangulalis is a moth of the family Crambidae described by Max Gaede in 1917. It is found in South Africa (Gauteng), Zimbabwe, and Mali.

This species has a wingspan of 26 mm and looks close to Glyphodes boseae Saalmüller, 1880 and Glyphodes mascarenalis de Joannis, 1906.
