= Glyphodes floridalis =

Scientific classification
- Kingdom: Animalia
- Phylum: Arthropoda
- Clade: Pancrustacea
- Class: Insecta
- Order: Lepidoptera
- Family: Crambidae
- Genus: Glyphodes
- Species: G. floridalis

Binomial name
- Glyphodes floridalis (Fernald, 1901)

Synonyms
- Marasmia floridalis Fernald, 1901

Species of moth

Glyphodes floridalis, the Florida milkweed vine moth, is a moth in the family Crambidae. It is found in North America, where it has been recorded from Florida.

Adults have been recorded on wing year round.

The larvae feed on Cynanchum angustifolium.
