= Glyphodes eribotesalis =

Scientific classification
- Kingdom: Animalia
- Phylum: Arthropoda
- Clade: Pancrustacea
- Class: Insecta
- Order: Lepidoptera
- Family: Crambidae
- Genus: Glyphodes
- Species: G. eribotesalis

Binomial name
- Glyphodes eribotesalis (Walker, 1859)

Synonyms
- Margaronia eribotesalis Walker, 1859

Species of moth

Glyphodes eribotesalis is a moth in the family Crambidae. It was described by Francis Walker in 1859. It is found in Brazil.
