= Glyphodes duponti =

Scientific classification
- Kingdom: Animalia
- Phylum: Arthropoda
- Clade: Pancrustacea
- Class: Insecta
- Order: Lepidoptera
- Family: Crambidae
- Genus: Glyphodes
- Species: G. duponti

Binomial name
- Glyphodes duponti de Joannis, 1915

Species of moth

Glyphodes duponti is a moth of the family Crambidae described by Joseph de Joannis in 1915. It is found in the Seychelles on La Digue and Marianne Island.

It has a wingspan of 28 mm.
