= Glyphodes bicoloralis =

Scientific classification
- Kingdom: Animalia
- Phylum: Arthropoda
- Clade: Pancrustacea
- Class: Insecta
- Order: Lepidoptera
- Family: Crambidae
- Genus: Glyphodes
- Species: G. bicoloralis

Binomial name
- Glyphodes bicoloralis Strand, 1912

Species of moth

Glyphodes bicoloralis is a moth in the family Crambidae. It was described by Strand in 1912. It is found in Cameroon, the Republic of Congo, the Democratic Republic of Congo and Ghana.
