= Glyphodes flavizonalis =

Scientific classification
- Kingdom: Animalia
- Phylum: Arthropoda
- Clade: Pancrustacea
- Class: Insecta
- Order: Lepidoptera
- Family: Crambidae
- Genus: Glyphodes
- Species: G. flavizonalis

Binomial name
- Glyphodes flavizonalis Hampson, 1898

Species of moth

Glyphodes flavizonalis is a moth in the family Crambidae. It was described by George Hampson in 1898. It is found in Australia, where it has been recorded from Queensland.

The wings are translucent brown, with a pattern of dark brown lines on the forewings.
