= Glyphodes rhombalis =

Scientific classification
- Kingdom: Animalia
- Phylum: Arthropoda
- Clade: Pancrustacea
- Class: Insecta
- Order: Lepidoptera
- Family: Crambidae
- Genus: Glyphodes
- Species: G. rhombalis

Binomial name
- Glyphodes rhombalis Viette, 1957

Species of moth

Glyphodes rhombalis is a moth in the family Crambidae. It was described by Viette in 1957. It is found in São Tomé & Principe.
