= Glyphodes fenestrata =

Scientific classification
- Kingdom: Animalia
- Phylum: Arthropoda
- Clade: Pancrustacea
- Class: Insecta
- Order: Lepidoptera
- Family: Crambidae
- Genus: Glyphodes
- Species: G. fenestrata

Binomial name
- Glyphodes fenestrata Inoue, 1996

Species of moth

Glyphodes fenestrata is a moth in the family Crambidae. It was described by Hiroshi Inoue in 1996. It is found in Japan, where it has been recorded from the Bonin Islands.
