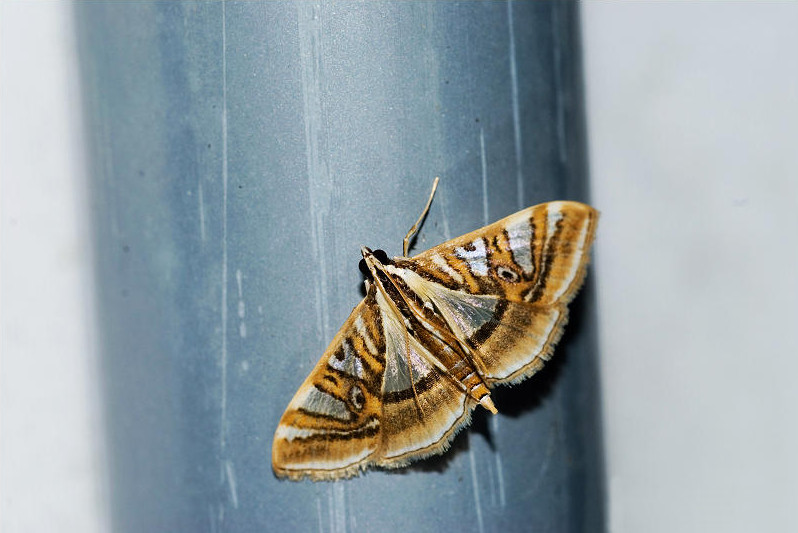

Scientific classification
- Kingdom: Animalia
- Phylum: Arthropoda
- Clade: Pancrustacea
- Class: Insecta
- Order: Lepidoptera
- Family: Crambidae
- Genus: Glyphodes
- Species: G. duplicalis

Binomial name
- Glyphodes duplicalis Inoue, Munroe & Mutuura, 1981

= Glyphodes duplicalis =

Species of moth

Glyphodes duplicalis is a moth in the family Crambidae. It was described by Hiroshi Inoue, Eugene G. Munroe and Akira Mutuura in 1981. It is found in Japan, Korea and Taiwan.
