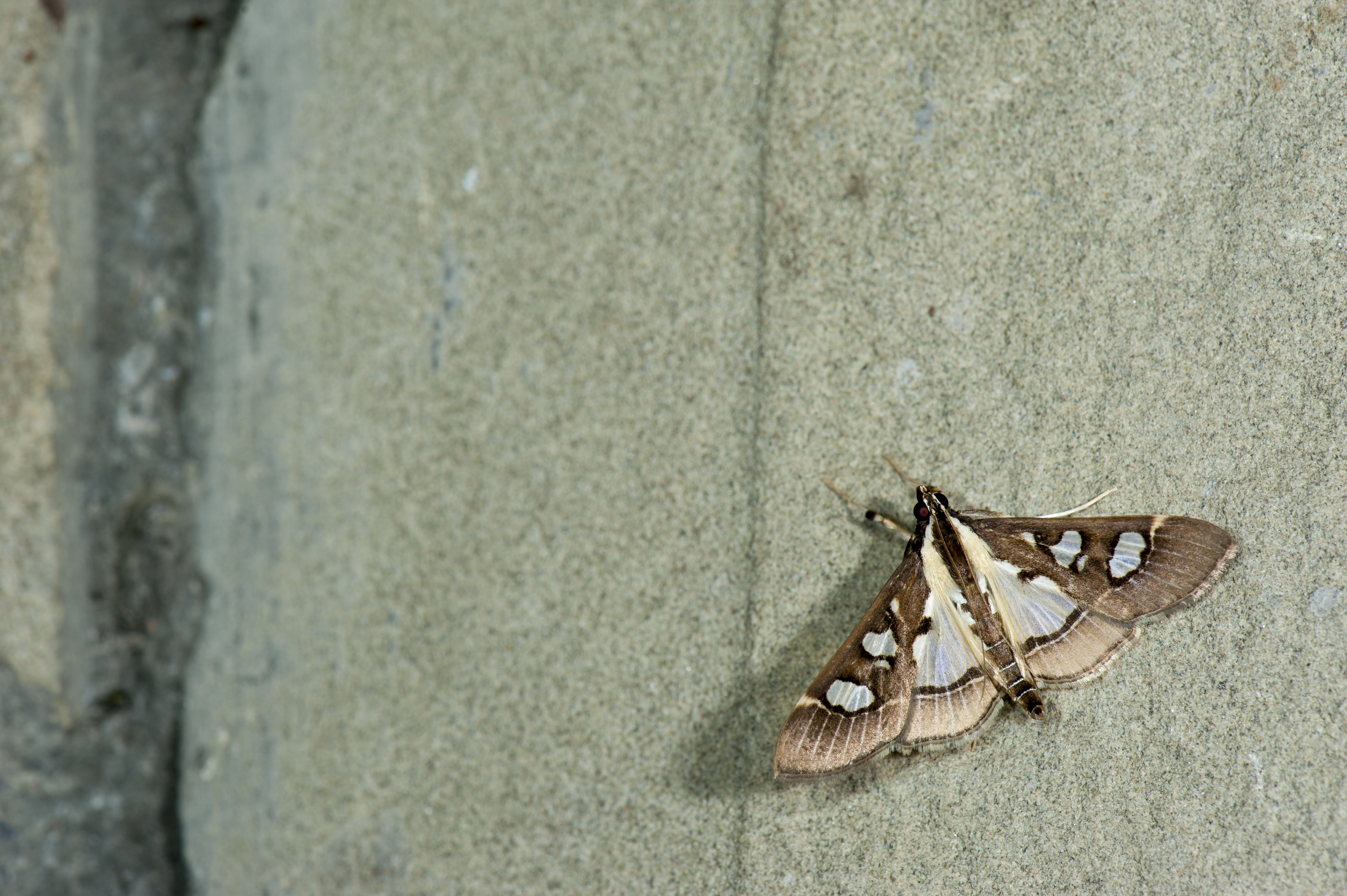

Scientific classification
- Kingdom: Animalia
- Phylum: Arthropoda
- Clade: Pancrustacea
- Class: Insecta
- Order: Lepidoptera
- Family: Crambidae
- Genus: Glyphodes
- Species: G. crithealis

Binomial name
- Glyphodes crithealis (Walker, 1859)

Synonyms
- Desmia crithealis Walker, 1859; Glyphodes crithealis f. minoralis Caradja, 1925; Glyphodes crithealis var. parvipunctalis Caradja, 1925

= Glyphodes crithealis =

Species of moth

Glyphodes crithealis is a moth in the family Crambidae. It was described by Francis Walker in 1859. It is found in China.
