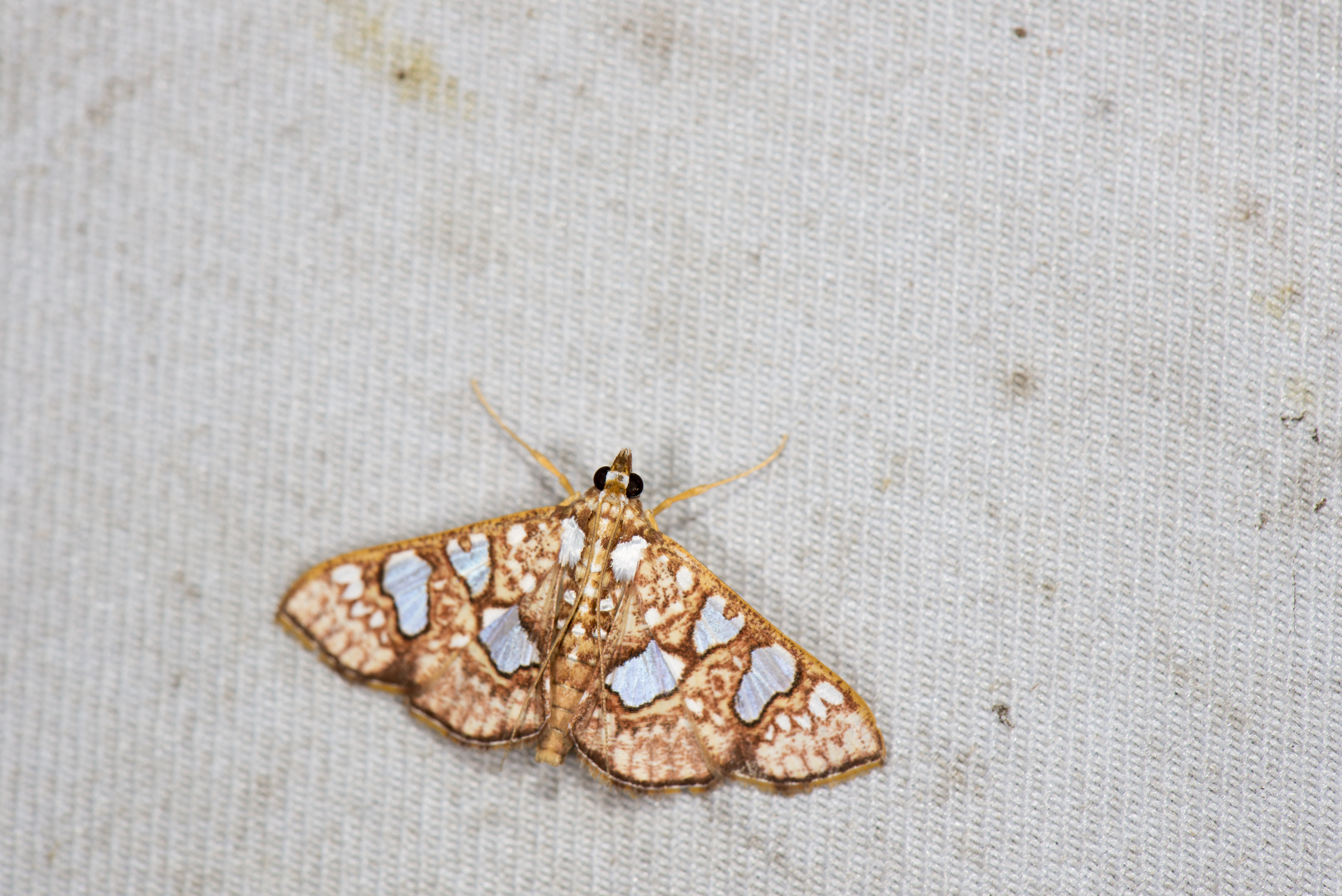

Scientific classification
- Kingdom: Animalia
- Phylum: Arthropoda
- Clade: Pancrustacea
- Class: Insecta
- Order: Lepidoptera
- Family: Crambidae
- Genus: Glyphodes
- Species: G. canthusalis

Binomial name
- Glyphodes canthusalis Walker, 1859

Synonyms
- Botys luciferalis Walker, 1866; Glyphodes lora Walker, 1866; Glyphodes spectandalis Snellen, 1895

= Glyphodes canthusalis =

Species of moth

Glyphodes canthusalis is a moth in the family Crambidae. It was described by Francis Walker in 1859. It is found in Taiwan, mainland India, Sri Lanka and on the Andaman Islands, Vietnam, Indonesia (Sumatra, Java) and Australia (Queensland and New South Wales).

The wingspan is about 30 mm. The wings have a pattern of brown filigree surrounding white patches.
