= Glyphodes basifascialis =

Scientific classification
- Kingdom: Animalia
- Phylum: Arthropoda
- Clade: Pancrustacea
- Class: Insecta
- Order: Lepidoptera
- Family: Crambidae
- Genus: Glyphodes
- Species: G. basifascialis

Binomial name
- Glyphodes basifascialis Hampson, 1899

Synonyms
- Glyphodes bipindalis Strand, 1912; Glyphodes bipindalis ab. lativittata Strand, 1912; Margaronia amicalis Swinhoe, 1904; Margaronia streptosigma var. ephypnias Meyrick, 1933

Species of moth

Glyphodes basifascialis is a moth in the family Crambidae. It was described by George Hampson in 1899. It is found in Australia, Cameroon, the Democratic Republic of the Congo (Katanga, Orientale, Equateur), the Seychelles, South Africa and Tanzania.

The larvae feed on Ficus species.
