= Glyphodes toulgoetalis =

Scientific classification
- Kingdom: Animalia
- Phylum: Arthropoda
- Clade: Pancrustacea
- Class: Insecta
- Order: Lepidoptera
- Family: Crambidae
- Genus: Glyphodes
- Species: G. toulgoetalis

Binomial name
- Glyphodes toulgoetalis (Marion, 1954)

Synonyms
- Diaphana toulgoetalis Marion, 1954

Species of moth

Glyphodes toulgoetalis is a moth in the family Crambidae. It was described by Hubert Marion in 1954. It is found on Madagascar.
