= Glyphodes royalis =

Scientific classification
- Kingdom: Animalia
- Phylum: Arthropoda
- Clade: Pancrustacea
- Class: Insecta
- Order: Lepidoptera
- Family: Crambidae
- Genus: Glyphodes
- Species: G. royalis

Binomial name
- Glyphodes royalis Marion, 1954

Species of moth

Glyphodes royalis is a moth in the family Crambidae. It was described by Hubert Marion in 1954. It is found in Guinea.
