= Glyphodes integralis =

Scientific classification
- Kingdom: Animalia
- Phylum: Arthropoda
- Clade: Pancrustacea
- Class: Insecta
- Order: Lepidoptera
- Family: Crambidae
- Genus: Glyphodes
- Species: G. integralis

Binomial name
- Glyphodes integralis (Lederer, 1863)

Synonyms
- Botys integralis Lederer, 1863

Species of moth

Glyphodes integralis is a moth in the family Crambidae. It was described by Julius Lederer in 1863. It is found in Venezuela.
