= Glyphodes doleschalii =

Scientific classification
- Kingdom: Animalia
- Phylum: Arthropoda
- Clade: Pancrustacea
- Class: Insecta
- Order: Lepidoptera
- Family: Crambidae
- Genus: Glyphodes
- Species: G. doleschalii

Binomial name
- Glyphodes doleschalii Lederer, 1863

Synonyms
- Glyphodes doleschali Lederer, 1863; Glyphodes doleschalli Lederer, 1863

Species of moth

Glyphodes doleschalii is a moth of the family Crambidae described by Julius Lederer in 1863. It is found in Queensland in northern Australia.
