= Glyphodes umbria =

Scientific classification
- Kingdom: Animalia
- Phylum: Arthropoda
- Clade: Pancrustacea
- Class: Insecta
- Order: Lepidoptera
- Family: Crambidae
- Genus: Glyphodes
- Species: G. umbria

Binomial name
- Glyphodes umbria Hampson, 1898

Species of moth

Glyphodes umbria is a moth of the family Crambidae described by George Hampson in 1898. It is known from Fergusson Island of Papua New Guinea.

This species has a wingspan of 43 mm.
