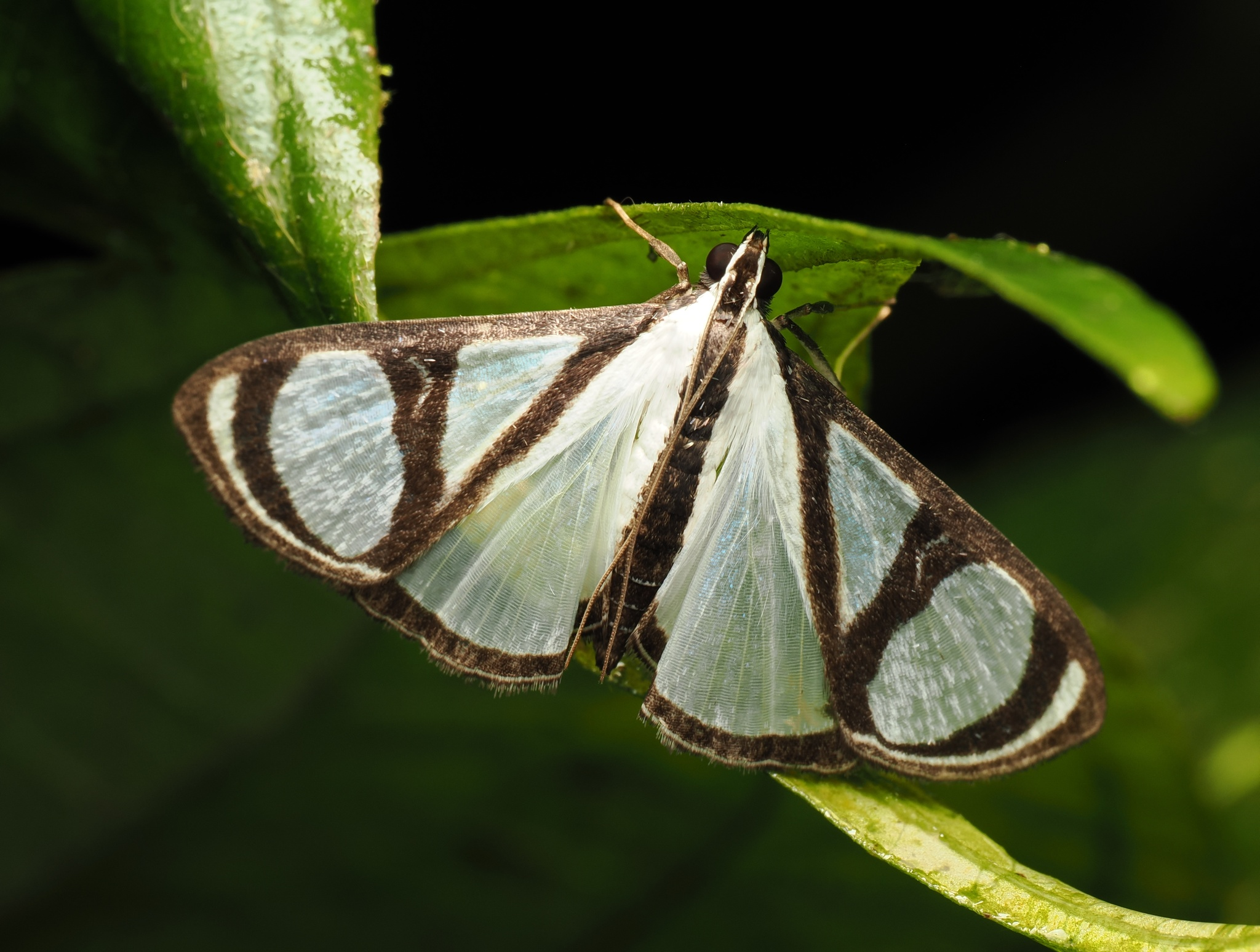

Scientific classification
- Kingdom: Animalia
- Phylum: Arthropoda
- Clade: Pancrustacea
- Class: Insecta
- Order: Lepidoptera
- Family: Crambidae
- Genus: Glyphodes
- Species: G. extorris

Binomial name
- Glyphodes extorris Dognin, 1905

Synonyms
- Glyphodes confinis Druce, 1902

= Glyphodes extorris =

Species of moth

Glyphodes extorris is a moth in the family Crambidae. It was described by Paul Dognin in 1905. It is found in Peru, Ecuador and Colombia.

== Gallery ==
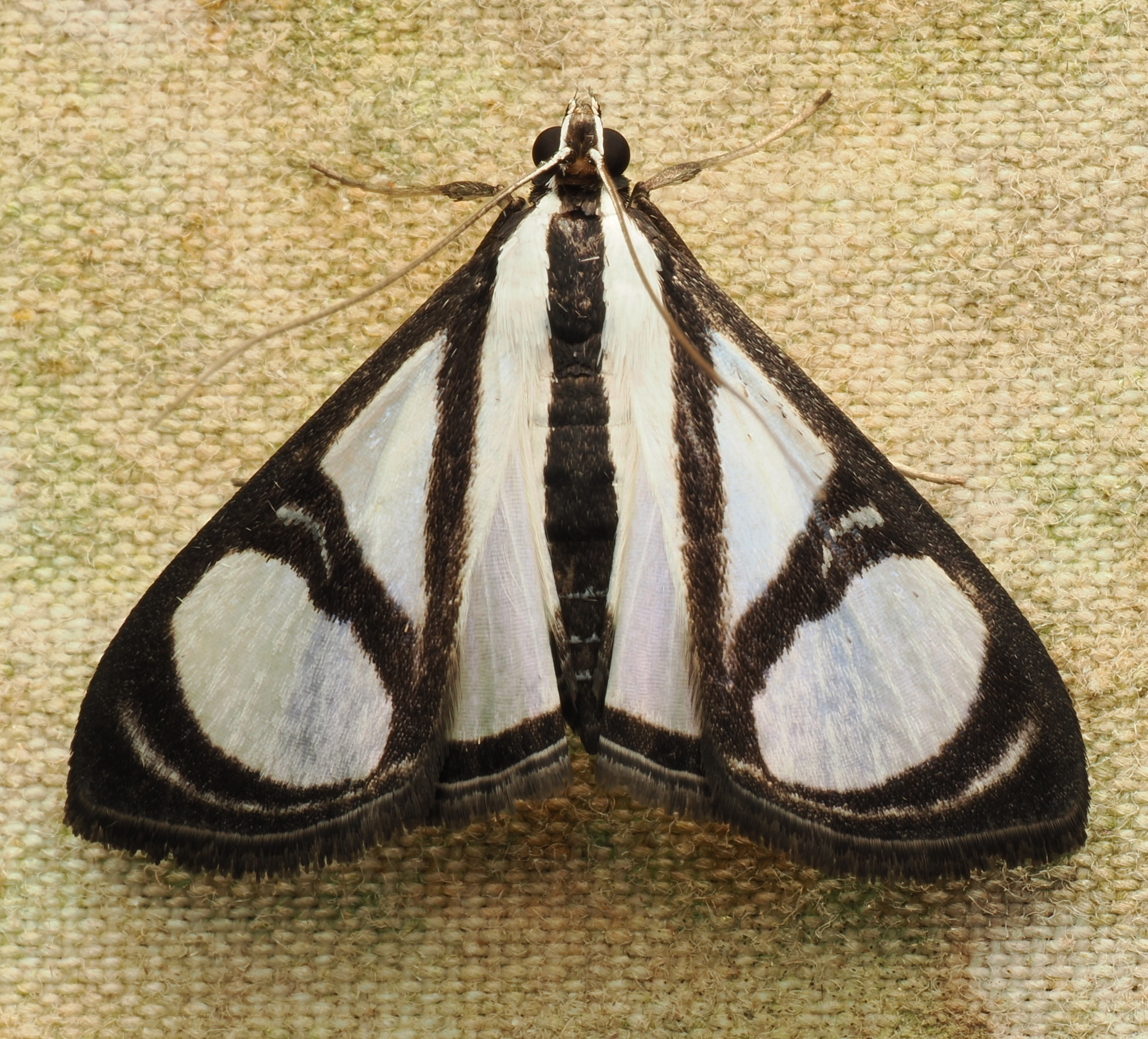
Glyphodes extorris from Quito, Ecuador

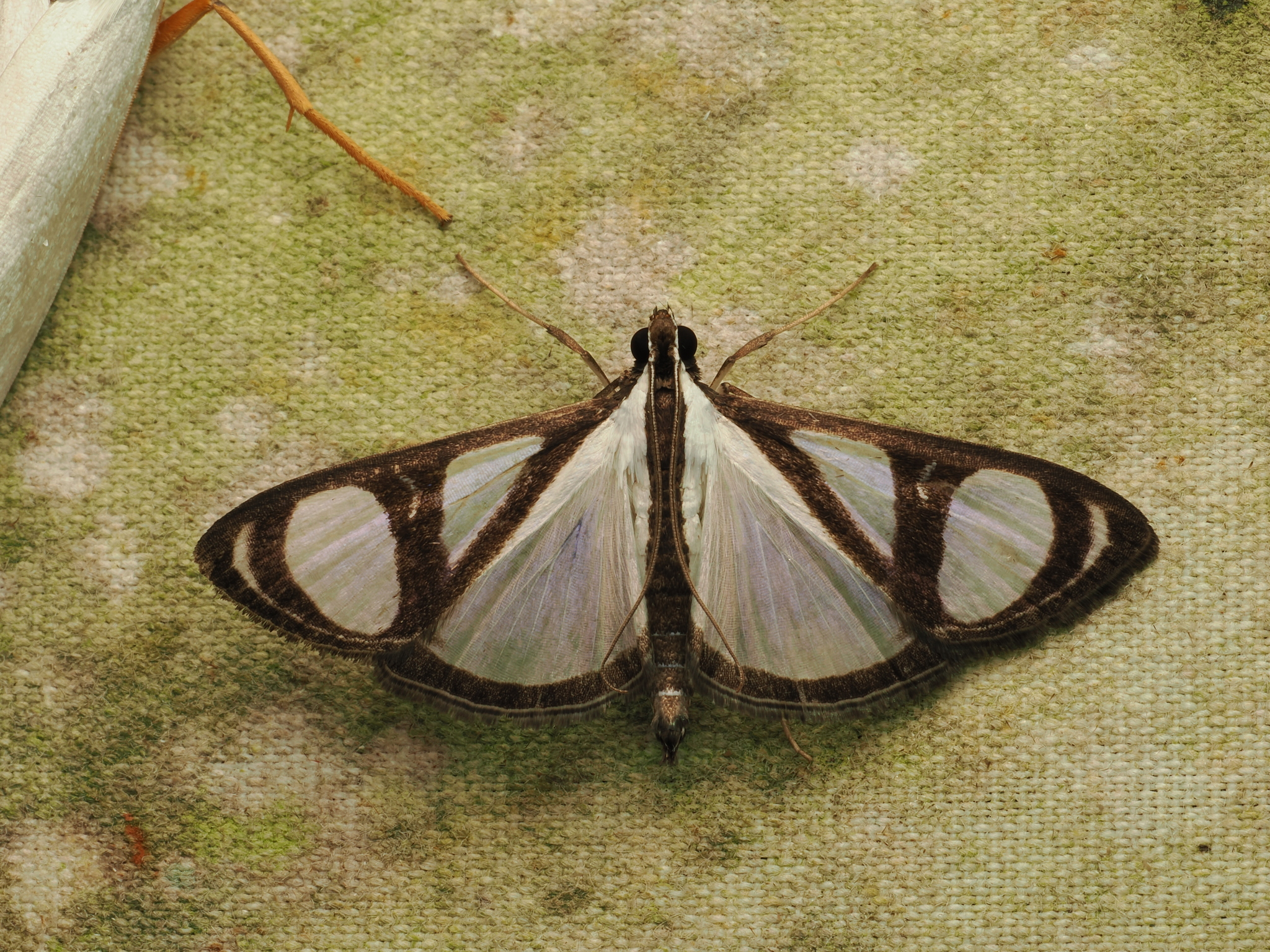
Glyphodes extorris from Quito, Ecuador

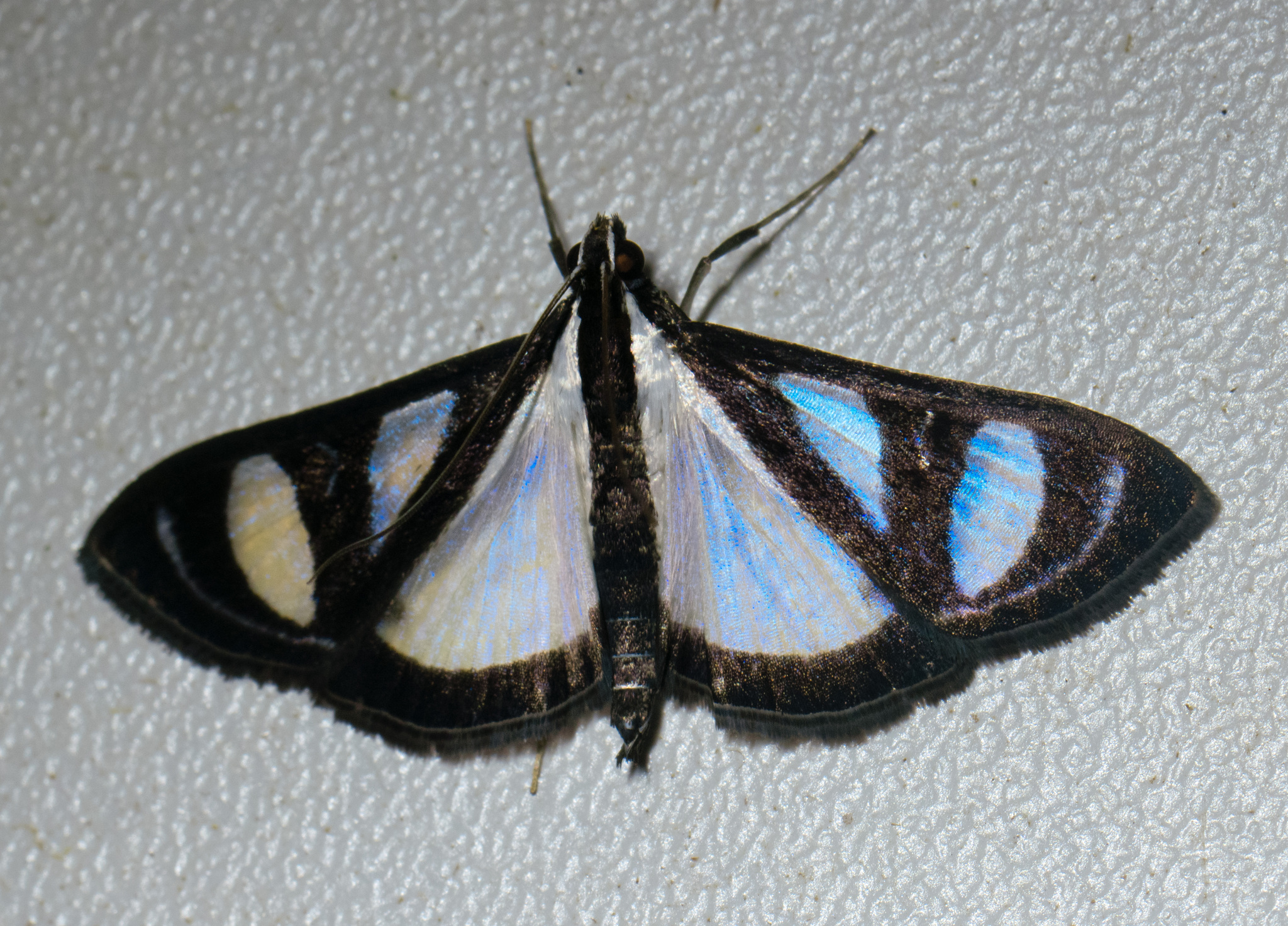
Glyphodes extorris from Pastaza, Ecuador
