= Glyphodes minimalis =

Scientific classification
- Kingdom: Animalia
- Phylum: Arthropoda
- Clade: Pancrustacea
- Class: Insecta
- Order: Lepidoptera
- Family: Crambidae
- Genus: Glyphodes
- Species: G. minimalis

Binomial name
- Glyphodes minimalis Hampson, 1896

Species of moth

Glyphodes minimalis is a moth in the family Crambidae. It was described by George Hampson in 1896. It is found in Sri Lanka.
