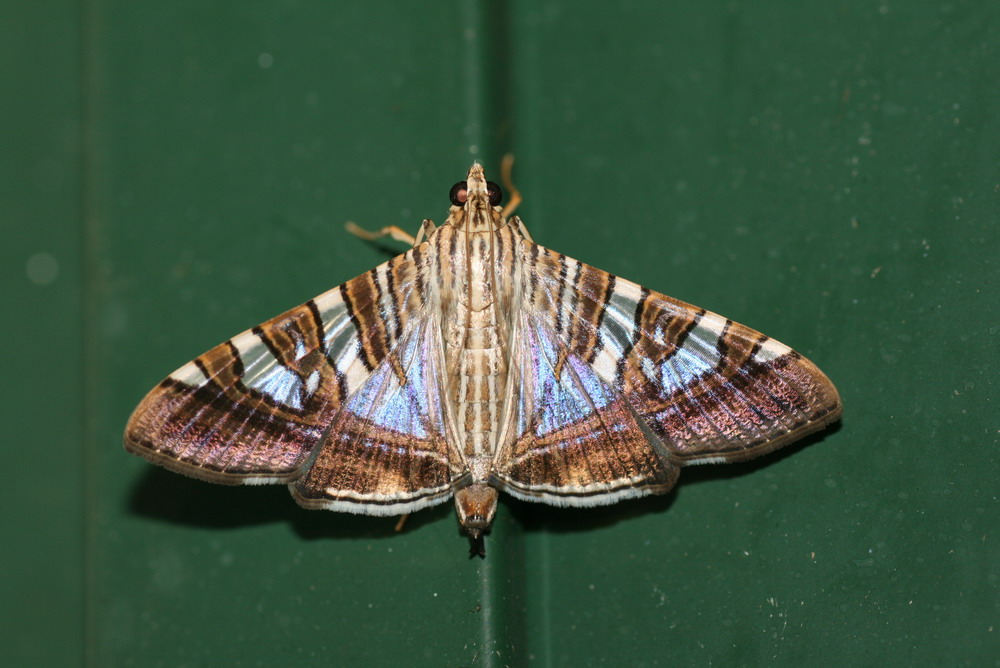
- Glyphodes stolalis

Scientific classification
- Kingdom: Animalia
- Phylum: Arthropoda
- Class: Insecta
- Order: Lepidoptera
- Family: Crambidae
- Subfamily: Spilomelinae
- Tribe: Margaroniini
- Genus: Glyphodes; Guenée, 1854

Synonyms
- Caloptychia Hübner, 1825; Calliptychia J. L. R. Agassiz, 1847; Dysallacta Lederer, 1863; Disallacta Lederer, 1863; Morocosma Lederer, 1863

= Glyphodes =

Genus of moths

Glyphodes is a genus of moths of the family Crambidae described by Achille Guenée in 1854.

== Species ==
- Glyphodes actorionalis Walker, 1859
- Glyphodes agathalis (Walker, 1859)
- Glyphodes amphipeda (Meyrick, 1939)
- Glyphodes aniferalis Hampson, 1909
- Glyphodes anomala Janse, 1928
- Glyphodes apiospila (Turner, 1922)
- Glyphodes argyraspides (Tams, 1941)
- Glyphodes argyritis Hampson, 1912
- Glyphodes aurantivittalis Munroe, 1960
- Glyphodes badialis (Walker, 1859)
- Glyphodes basifascialis Hampson, 1899
- Glyphodes bicolor (Swainson, 1821)
- Glyphodes bicoloralis Strand, 1912
- Glyphodes bilunalis (Snellen, 1895)
- Glyphodes bipunctalis Leech, 1889
- Glyphodes bitjealis Strand, 1920
- Glyphodes bitriangulalis Gaede, 1917
- Glyphodes bivitralis Guenée, 1854
- Glyphodes bocchorialis Hampson, 1912
- Glyphodes boseae Saalmüller, 1880
- Glyphodes bradleyi (Whalley, 1962)
- Glyphodes cadeti Guillermet in Viette & Guillermet, 1996
- Glyphodes caeruleiceps Hampson, 1912
- Glyphodes caesalis Walker, 1859
- Glyphodes callipona (Turner, 1908)
- Glyphodes callizona (Meyrick, 1894)
- Glyphodes canthusalis Walker, 1859
- Glyphodes chalcicraspis Hampson, 1912
- Glyphodes chilka Moore, 1888
- Glyphodes chlorophylalis Hampson, 1912
- Glyphodes chrysialis (Stoll, 1790)
- Glyphodes confiniodes Amsel, 1956
- Glyphodes conjunctalis Walker, 1866
- Glyphodes convolvulalis (Sepp, 1848)
- Glyphodes cosmarcha Meyrick, 1887
- Glyphodes crameralis Snellen, 1880
- Glyphodes crithealis (Walker, 1859)
- Glyphodes cupripennalis Hampson, 1896
- Glyphodes cyanomichla (Meyrick, 1899)
- Glyphodes delicatalis Schaus, 1924
- Glyphodes desmialis Mabille, 1900
- Glyphodes difficilalis Strand, 1912
- Glyphodes dinichealis (Walker, 1859)
- Glyphodes diplocyma Hampson, 1912
- Glyphodes doleschalii Lederer, 1863
- Glyphodes duplicalis Inoue, Munroe & Mutuura, 1981
- Glyphodes duponti de Joannis, 1915
- Glyphodes dysallactalis Hampson, 1896
- Glyphodes eribotesalis (Walker, 1859)
- Glyphodes ernalis Swinhoe, 1894
- Glyphodes euchlorisalis (Hampson, 1918)
- Glyphodes eudoxia J. F. G. Clarke, 1971
- Glyphodes eurygania Druce, 1902
- Glyphodes expansialis Strand, 1912
- Glyphodes extorris Dognin, 1905
- Glyphodes fenestrata Inoue, 1996
- Glyphodes flavizonalis Hampson, 1898
- Glyphodes floridalis (Fernald, 1901)
- Glyphodes formosanus Shibuya, 1928
- Glyphodes gaujonialis (Dognin, 1905)
- Glyphodes grandisalis Druce, 1902
- Glyphodes heliconialis (Guenée, 1854)
- Glyphodes inclusalis Gaede, 1917
- Glyphodes inflamatalis (Hampson, 1912)
- Glyphodes integralis (Lederer, 1863)
- Glyphodes interruptalis (Amsel, 1950)
- Glyphodes iridescens Rothschild, 1915
- Glyphodes jaculalis Snellen, 1894
- Glyphodes kunupialis Janse, 1928
- Glyphodes lachesis Butler, 1882
- Glyphodes lacustralis Moore, 1867
- Glyphodes loloalis Strand, 1912
- Glyphodes lupinalis (Schaus, 1927)
- Glyphodes luzonica (Sauber in Semper, 1899)
- Glyphodes magnificalis Kenrick, 1912
- Glyphodes margaritaria (Clerck, 1764)
- Glyphodes mascarenalis de Joannis, 1906
- Glyphodes mesozona Lower, 1901
- Glyphodes metastictalis Hampson, 1899
- Glyphodes microta Meyrick, 1889
- Glyphodes mijamo Viette, 1989
- Glyphodes militaris Munroe, 1976
- Glyphodes minimalis Hampson, 1896
- Glyphodes multilinealis Kenrick, 1907
- Glyphodes naralis C. Felder, R. Felder & Rogenhofer, 1875
- Glyphodes negatalis (Walker, 1859)
- Glyphodes nitidaria (Pagenstecher, 1899)
- Glyphodes nigribasalis Caradja, 1925
- Glyphodes nigricincta Kenrick, 1912
- Glyphodes nilgirica Hampson, 1896
- Glyphodes obscura Munroe, 1959
- Glyphodes ochripictalis Strand, 1912
- Glyphodes onychinalis (Guenée, 1854)
- Glyphodes orbiferalis Hampson, 1896
- Glyphodes oriolalis Viette, 1958
- Glyphodes pandectalis Snellen, 1895
- Glyphodes paramicalis Kenrick, 1917
- Glyphodes parallelalis Gaede, 1917
- Glyphodes paucilinealis Kenrick, 1907
- Glyphodes perelegans (Hampson, 1899)
- Glyphodes perspicualis Kenrick, 1907
- Glyphodes phormingopa (Meyrick, 1934)
- Glyphodes phytonalis (Walker, 1859)
- Glyphodes polystrigalis (Hampson, 1918)
- Glyphodes pradolalis (Dognin, 1897)
- Glyphodes praefulgida E. Hering, 1903
- Glyphodes principalis Walker, 1865
- Glyphodes prothymalis Swinhoe, 1892
- Glyphodes proximalis Snellen, 1899
- Glyphodes pryeri Butler, 1879
- Glyphodes pseudocaesalis Kenrick, 1912
- Glyphodes pulverulentalis Hampson, 1896
- Glyphodes pyloalis Walker, 1859
- Glyphodes quadrifascialis Hampson, 1899
- Glyphodes quadrimaculalis Bremer & Grey, 1853
- Glyphodes quadristigmalis Kenrick, 1907
- Glyphodes rhombalis Viette, 1957
- Glyphodes rioalis (Schaus, 1920)
- Glyphodes rotundalis (Snellen, 1901)
- Glyphodes royalis Marion, 1954
- Glyphodes sanguimarginalis (Hampson, 1899)
- Glyphodes scheffleri Strand, 1912
- Glyphodes serenalis Snellen, 1880
- Glyphodes serosalis (Dognin, 1897)
- Glyphodes shafferorum Viette, 1987
- Glyphodes sibillalis Walker, 1859
- Glyphodes speculifera Druce, 1902
- Glyphodes stictoperalis (Hampson, 1913)
- Glyphodes stolalis Guenée, 1854
- Glyphodes streptostigma Hampson, 1899
- Glyphodes strialis (Wang, 1963)
- Glyphodes subamicalis T. B. Fletcher, 1910
- Glyphodes subcrameralis Pagenstecher, 1900
- Glyphodes summaperta (Dyar, 1925)
- Glyphodes sycina (Tams, 1941)
- Glyphodes terealis Walker, 1859
- Glyphodes tolimalis (Schaus, 1924)
- Glyphodes toulgoetalis Marion, 1954
- Glyphodes umbria Hampson, 1898
- Glyphodes vagilinea Hampson, 1912
- Glyphodes vertumnalis (Guenée, 1854)
- Glyphodes viettealis (Marion, 1954)
- Glyphodes virginalis Rebel, 1915
- Glyphodes westermani Snellen, 1877
- Glyphodes xanthonota (Meyrick, 1936)
- Glyphodes xanthostola Hampson, 1910
- Glyphodes zenkeralis Strand, 1912

== Selected former species ==
- Glyphodes alboscapulalis (Swinhoe, 1917)
- Glyphodes itysalis Walker, 1859
- Glyphodes cleonadalis (Swinhoe, 1904)
- Glyphodes crameralis Guenée, 1854
- Glyphodes dermatalis C. Felder, R. Felder & Rogenhofer, 1875
- Glyphodes exquisitalis Kenrick, 1907
- Glyphodes hilaralis (Walker, 1859)
- Glyphodes incomposita Bethune-Baker, 1909
- Glyphodes malgassalis Mabille, 1900
- Glyphodes megalopa Meyrick, 1889
- Glyphodes savyalis (Legrand, 1966)
