= Glyphodes margaritaria =

Scientific classification
- Kingdom: Animalia
- Phylum: Arthropoda
- Clade: Pancrustacea
- Class: Insecta
- Order: Lepidoptera
- Family: Crambidae
- Genus: Glyphodes
- Species: G. margaritaria

Binomial name
- Glyphodes margaritaria (Clerck, 1764)

Synonyms
- Phalaena margaritaria Clerck, 1764; Glyphodes crameralis Guenée, 1854; Morocosma polybapta Butler, 1882; Glyphodes lineata Lucas, 1894; Heterocnephes aegialis Swinhoe, 1917

Species of moth

Glyphodes margaritaria is a moth in the family Crambidae. It was described by Carl Alexander Clerck in 1764. It is found in Indonesia (Ambon Island), New Guinea and northern Australia, including Queensland.

The wingspan is about 30 mm. There is a pattern of white, red and dark brown on the wings.
