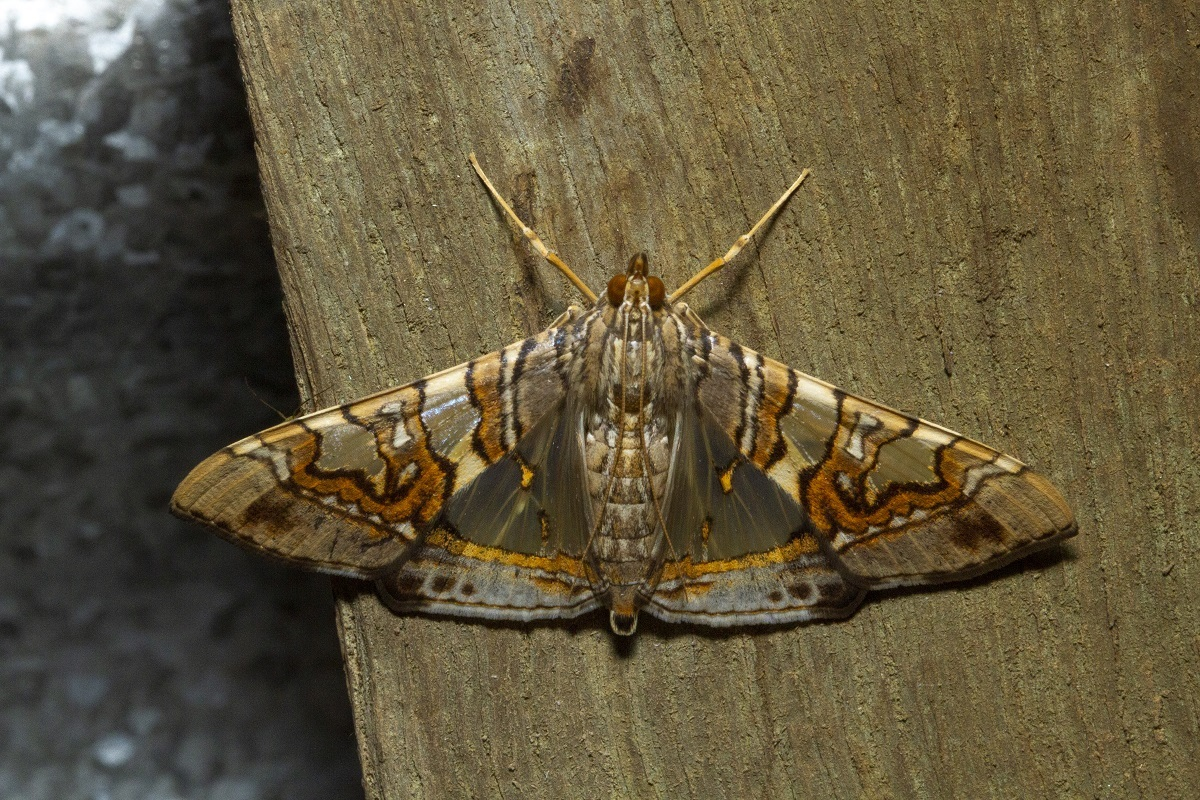

Scientific classification
- Kingdom: Animalia
- Phylum: Arthropoda
- Clade: Pancrustacea
- Class: Insecta
- Order: Lepidoptera
- Family: Crambidae
- Genus: Glyphodes
- Species: G. cosmarcha

Binomial name
- Glyphodes cosmarcha Meyrick, 1887

= Glyphodes cosmarcha =

Species of moth

Glyphodes cosmarcha is a moth in the family Crambidae. It was described by Edward Meyrick in 1887. It is found in Thailand, New Guinea and in Australia, where it has been recorded from Queensland and New South Wales.

The larvae feed on the leaves of various Ficus species.
