= Glyphodes bocchorialis =

Scientific classification
- Kingdom: Animalia
- Phylum: Arthropoda
- Clade: Pancrustacea
- Class: Insecta
- Order: Lepidoptera
- Family: Crambidae
- Genus: Glyphodes
- Species: G. bocchorialis

Binomial name
- Glyphodes bocchorialis Hampson, 1912

Species of moth

Glyphodes bocchorialis is a moth in the family Crambidae. It was described by George Hampson in 1912. It is found in Malaysia.
