= Glyphodes subcrameralis =

Scientific classification
- Kingdom: Animalia
- Phylum: Arthropoda
- Clade: Pancrustacea
- Class: Insecta
- Order: Lepidoptera
- Family: Crambidae
- Genus: Glyphodes
- Species: G. subcrameralis

Binomial name
- Glyphodes subcrameralis Pagenstecher, 1900

Species of moth

Glyphodes subcrameralis is a moth in the family Crambidae. It was described by Pagenstecher in 1900. It is found in Papua New Guinea.
