= Glyphodes delicatalis =

Scientific classification
- Kingdom: Animalia
- Phylum: Arthropoda
- Clade: Pancrustacea
- Class: Insecta
- Order: Lepidoptera
- Family: Crambidae
- Genus: Glyphodes
- Species: G. delicatalis

Binomial name
- Glyphodes delicatalis Schaus, 1924

Species of moth

Glyphodes delicatalis is a moth in the family Crambidae. It was described by Schaus in 1924. It is found in Argentina.
