= Glyphodes principalis =

Scientific classification
- Kingdom: Animalia
- Phylum: Arthropoda
- Clade: Pancrustacea
- Class: Insecta
- Order: Lepidoptera
- Family: Crambidae
- Genus: Glyphodes
- Species: G. principalis

Binomial name
- Glyphodes principalis Walker, 1865

Species of moth

Glyphodes principalis is a moth in the family Crambidae. It was described by Francis Walker in 1865. It is found on Sumatra.
