= Glyphodes iridescens =

Scientific classification
- Kingdom: Animalia
- Phylum: Arthropoda
- Clade: Pancrustacea
- Class: Insecta
- Order: Lepidoptera
- Family: Crambidae
- Genus: Glyphodes
- Species: G. iridescens

Binomial name
- Glyphodes iridescens Rothschild, 1915

Species of moth

Glyphodes iridescens is a moth in the family Crambidae. It was described by Rothschild in 1915. It is found in Papua New Guinea.
