= Glyphodes jaculalis =

Scientific classification
- Kingdom: Animalia
- Phylum: Arthropoda
- Clade: Pancrustacea
- Class: Insecta
- Order: Lepidoptera
- Family: Crambidae
- Genus: Glyphodes
- Species: G. jaculalis

Binomial name
- Glyphodes jaculalis Snellen, 1894

Species of moth

Glyphodes jaculalis is a moth in the family Crambidae. It was described by Snellen in 1894. It is found on Java.
