= Glyphodes dinichealis =

Scientific classification
- Kingdom: Animalia
- Phylum: Arthropoda
- Clade: Pancrustacea
- Class: Insecta
- Order: Lepidoptera
- Family: Crambidae
- Genus: Glyphodes
- Species: G. dinichealis

Binomial name
- Glyphodes dinichealis (Walker, 1859)

Synonyms
- Botys dinichealis Walker, 1859; Tegostoma diniclealis Amsel, 1956

Species of moth

Glyphodes dinichealis is a moth in the family Crambidae. It was described by Francis Walker in 1859. It is found in Rio de Janeiro, Brazil.
