= Glyphodes chlorophylalis =

Scientific classification
- Kingdom: Animalia
- Phylum: Arthropoda
- Clade: Pancrustacea
- Class: Insecta
- Order: Lepidoptera
- Family: Crambidae
- Genus: Glyphodes
- Species: G. chlorophylalis

Binomial name
- Glyphodes chlorophylalis Hampson, 1912

Species of moth

Glyphodes chlorophylalis is a moth in the family Crambidae. It was described by George Hampson in 1912. It is found in Papua New Guinea.
