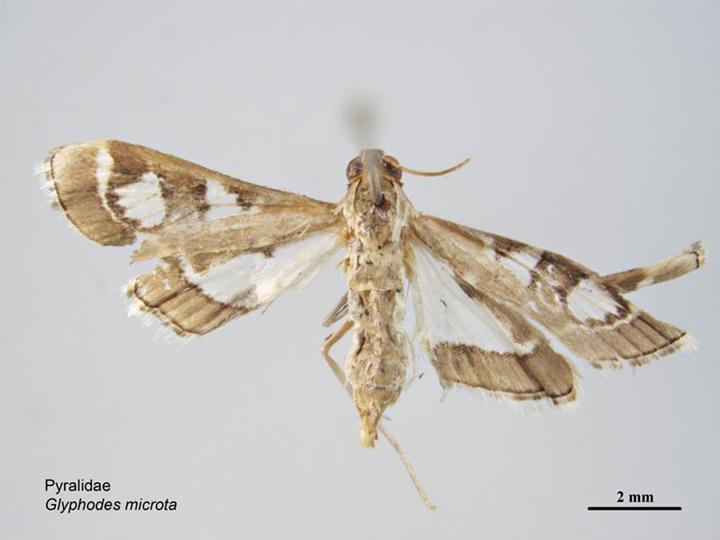
- Dorsal view
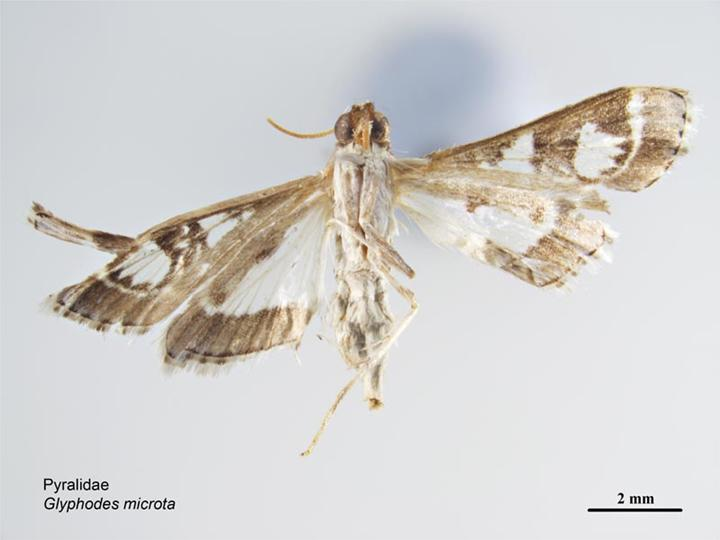
- Ventral view

Scientific classification
- Kingdom: Animalia
- Phylum: Arthropoda
- Clade: Pancrustacea
- Class: Insecta
- Order: Lepidoptera
- Family: Crambidae
- Genus: Glyphodes
- Species: G. microta

Binomial name
- Glyphodes microta Meyrick, 1889

Synonyms
- Diaphania bivitralis; Glyphodes alitalis Hulst, 1886; Morocosma alitalis

= Glyphodes microta =

Species of moth

Glyphodes microta is a moth of the family Crambidae. It is found in Australia, where it ranges from the east coast to the west coast across the middle of the continent.

The wingspan is about 20 mm.
