= Glyphodes callizona =

Scientific classification
- Kingdom: Animalia
- Phylum: Arthropoda
- Clade: Pancrustacea
- Class: Insecta
- Order: Lepidoptera
- Family: Crambidae
- Genus: Glyphodes
- Species: G. callizona

Binomial name
- Glyphodes callizona (Meyrick, 1894)

Synonyms
- Margaronia callizona Meyrick, 1894

Species of moth

Glyphodes callizona is a moth in the family Crambidae. It was described by Edward Meyrick in 1894. It is found in Myanmar.
