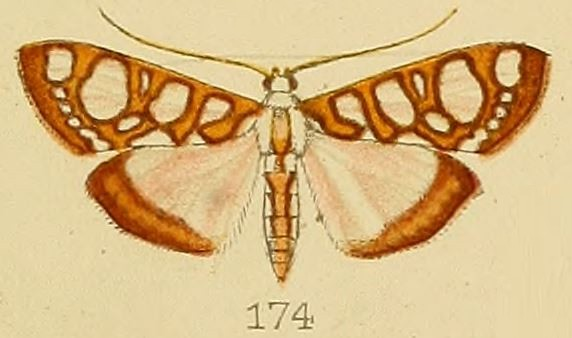

Scientific classification
- Kingdom: Animalia
- Phylum: Arthropoda
- Clade: Pancrustacea
- Class: Insecta
- Order: Lepidoptera
- Family: Crambidae
- Genus: Glyphodes
- Species: G. perspicualis

Binomial name
- Glyphodes perspicualis Kenrick, 1907

= Glyphodes perspicualis =

Species of moth

Glyphodes perspicualis is a species of moth of the family Crambidae. It was described by George Hamilton Kenrick in 1907 and it is found in Papua New Guinea.

It has a wingspan of 32 mm.
