= Glyphodes obscura =

Scientific classification
- Kingdom: Animalia
- Phylum: Arthropoda
- Clade: Pancrustacea
- Class: Insecta
- Order: Lepidoptera
- Family: Crambidae
- Genus: Glyphodes
- Species: G. obscura

Binomial name
- Glyphodes obscura Munroe, 1959

Species of moth

Glyphodes obscura is a moth in the family Crambidae. It was described by Eugene G. Munroe in 1959. It is found in Papua New Guinea.
