= Glyphodes luzonica =

Scientific classification
- Kingdom: Animalia
- Phylum: Arthropoda
- Clade: Pancrustacea
- Class: Insecta
- Order: Lepidoptera
- Family: Crambidae
- Genus: Glyphodes
- Species: G. luzonica

Binomial name
- Glyphodes luzonica (Sauber in Semper, 1899)

Synonyms
- Dysallacta luzonica Sauber in Semper, 1899

Species of moth

Glyphodes luzonica is a moth in the family Crambidae. It was described by Sauber in 1899. It is found on Luzon in the Philippines.
