= Glyphodes eurygania =

Scientific classification
- Kingdom: Animalia
- Phylum: Arthropoda
- Clade: Pancrustacea
- Class: Insecta
- Order: Lepidoptera
- Family: Crambidae
- Genus: Glyphodes
- Species: G. eurygania

Binomial name
- Glyphodes eurygania H. Druce, 1902

Synonyms
- Margaronia alboscapulalis Swinhoe, 1917; Glyphodes alboscapulalis

Species of moth

Glyphodes eurygania is a moth in the family Crambidae. It was described by Herbert Druce in 1902. It is found in Papua New Guinea, among other places.
