= Glyphodes ochripictalis =

Scientific classification
- Kingdom: Animalia
- Phylum: Arthropoda
- Clade: Pancrustacea
- Class: Insecta
- Order: Lepidoptera
- Family: Crambidae
- Genus: Glyphodes
- Species: G. ochripictalis

Binomial name
- Glyphodes ochripictalis Strand, 1912

Synonyms
- Glyphodes ochripictalis var. togoalis Strand, 1912

Species of moth

Glyphodes ochripictalis is a moth in the family Crambidae. It was described by Strand in 1912. It is found in Togo and Tanzania.
