= Glyphodes inflamatalis =

Scientific classification
- Kingdom: Animalia
- Phylum: Arthropoda
- Clade: Pancrustacea
- Class: Insecta
- Order: Lepidoptera
- Family: Crambidae
- Genus: Glyphodes
- Species: G. inflamatalis

Binomial name
- Glyphodes inflamatalis (Hampson, 1912)

Synonyms
- Syngamia inflamatalis Hampson, 1912; Syngamia inflammatalis

Species of moth

Glyphodes inflamatalis is a moth in the family Crambidae. It was described by George Hampson in 1912. It is found in Paraguay.
