= Glyphodes xanthonota =

Scientific classification
- Kingdom: Animalia
- Phylum: Arthropoda
- Clade: Pancrustacea
- Class: Insecta
- Order: Lepidoptera
- Family: Crambidae
- Genus: Glyphodes
- Species: G. xanthonota

Binomial name
- Glyphodes xanthonota (Meyrick, 1936)

Synonyms
- Margaronia xanthonota Meyrick, 1936

Species of moth

Glyphodes xanthonota is a moth in the family Crambidae. It was described by Edward Meyrick in 1936. It is found in the Democratic Republic of the Congo and Rwanda.
