= Glyphodes polystrigalis =

Scientific classification
- Kingdom: Animalia
- Phylum: Arthropoda
- Clade: Pancrustacea
- Class: Insecta
- Order: Lepidoptera
- Family: Crambidae
- Genus: Glyphodes
- Species: G. polystrigalis

Binomial name
- Glyphodes polystrigalis (Hampson, 1918)

Synonyms
- Botys polystrigalis Hampson, 1918

Species of moth

Glyphodes polystrigalis is a moth in the family Crambidae. It was described by George Hampson in 1918. It is found in Papua New Guinea.
