= Glyphodes mijamo =

Scientific classification
- Kingdom: Animalia
- Phylum: Arthropoda
- Clade: Pancrustacea
- Class: Insecta
- Order: Lepidoptera
- Family: Crambidae
- Genus: Glyphodes
- Species: G. mijamo

Binomial name
- Glyphodes mijamo Viette, 1989

Species of moth

Glyphodes mijamo is a moth in the family Crambidae. It was described by Viette in 1989. It is found in Madagascar.
