= Glyphodes stictoperalis =

Scientific classification
- Kingdom: Animalia
- Phylum: Arthropoda
- Clade: Pancrustacea
- Class: Insecta
- Order: Lepidoptera
- Family: Crambidae
- Genus: Glyphodes
- Species: G. stictoperalis

Binomial name
- Glyphodes stictoperalis (Hampson, 1913)

Synonyms
- Sameodes stictoperalis Hampson, 1913

Species of moth

Glyphodes stictoperalis is a moth in the family Crambidae. It was described by George Hampson in 1913. It is found in Peru.
