= Glyphodes pryeri =

Scientific classification
- Kingdom: Animalia
- Phylum: Arthropoda
- Clade: Pancrustacea
- Class: Insecta
- Order: Lepidoptera
- Family: Crambidae
- Genus: Glyphodes
- Species: G. pryeri

Binomial name
- Glyphodes pryeri Butler, 1879

Species of moth

Glyphodes pryeri is a moth in the family Crambidae. It was described by Arthur Gardiner Butler in 1879. It is found in Japan.
