= Glyphodes strialis =

Scientific classification
- Kingdom: Animalia
- Phylum: Arthropoda
- Clade: Pancrustacea
- Class: Insecta
- Order: Lepidoptera
- Family: Crambidae
- Genus: Glyphodes
- Species: G. strialis

Binomial name
- Glyphodes strialis (Wang, 1963)

Synonyms
- Diaphania strialis Wang, 1963

Species of moth

Glyphodes strialis is a moth in the family Crambidae. It was described by Wang in 1963. It is found in China (Yunnan).
