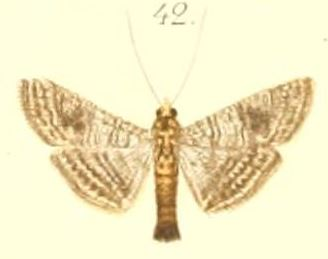

Scientific classification
- Kingdom: Animalia
- Phylum: Arthropoda
- Clade: Pancrustacea
- Class: Insecta
- Order: Lepidoptera
- Family: Crambidae
- Genus: Glyphodes
- Species: G. pulverulentalis

Binomial name
- Glyphodes pulverulentalis Hampson, 1896

Synonyms
- Diaphania pulverulentis; Margaronia pulverulentalis

= Glyphodes pulverulentalis =

Species of moth

Glyphodes pulverulentalis is a moth of the family Crambidae. It was first described by George Hampson in 1896.

== Distribution ==
It is known from China, Papua New Guinea, Australia, India and Thailand.

== Biology ==
The larvae feed on the leaves of mulberries (Morus sp.).
