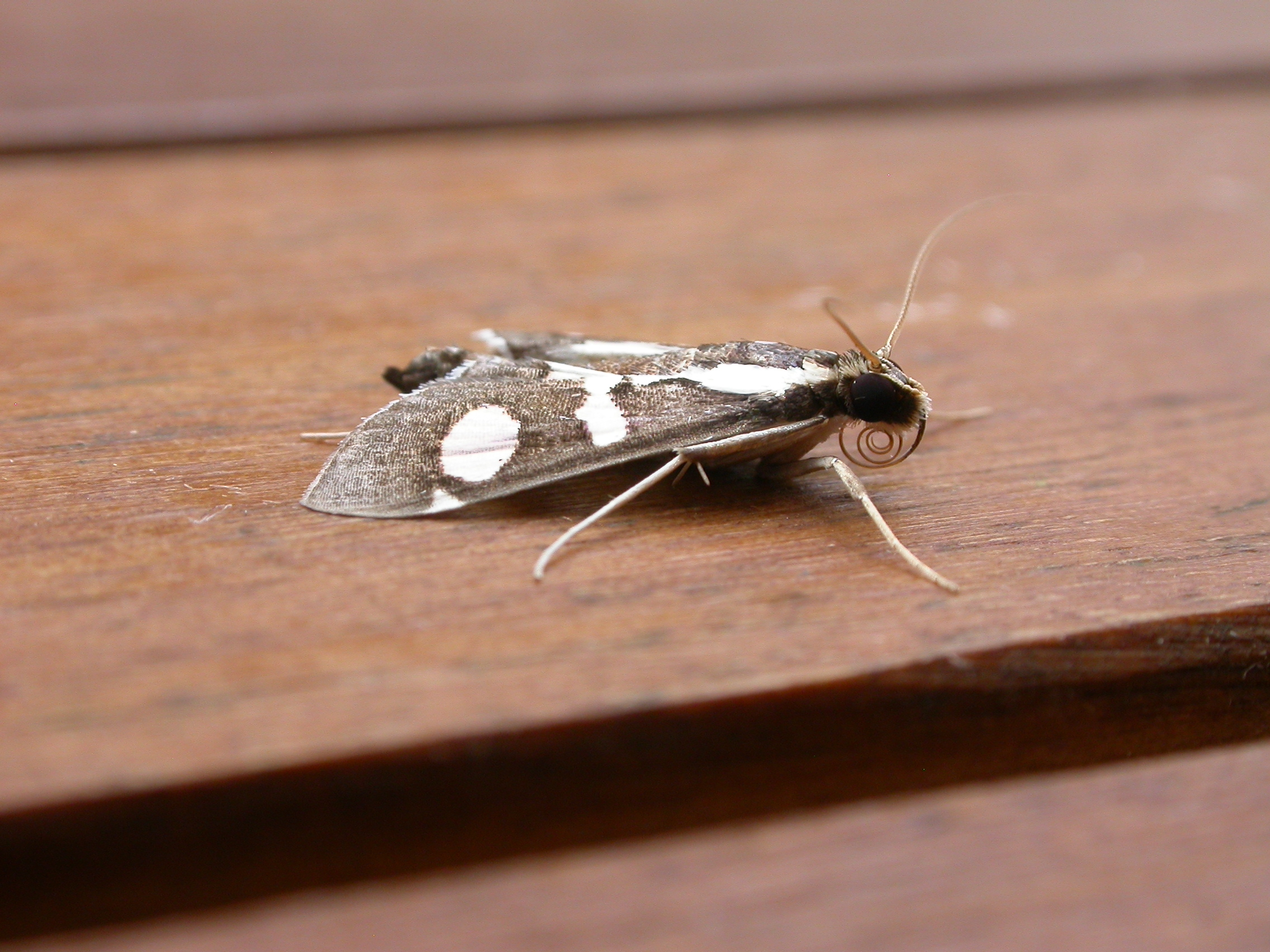

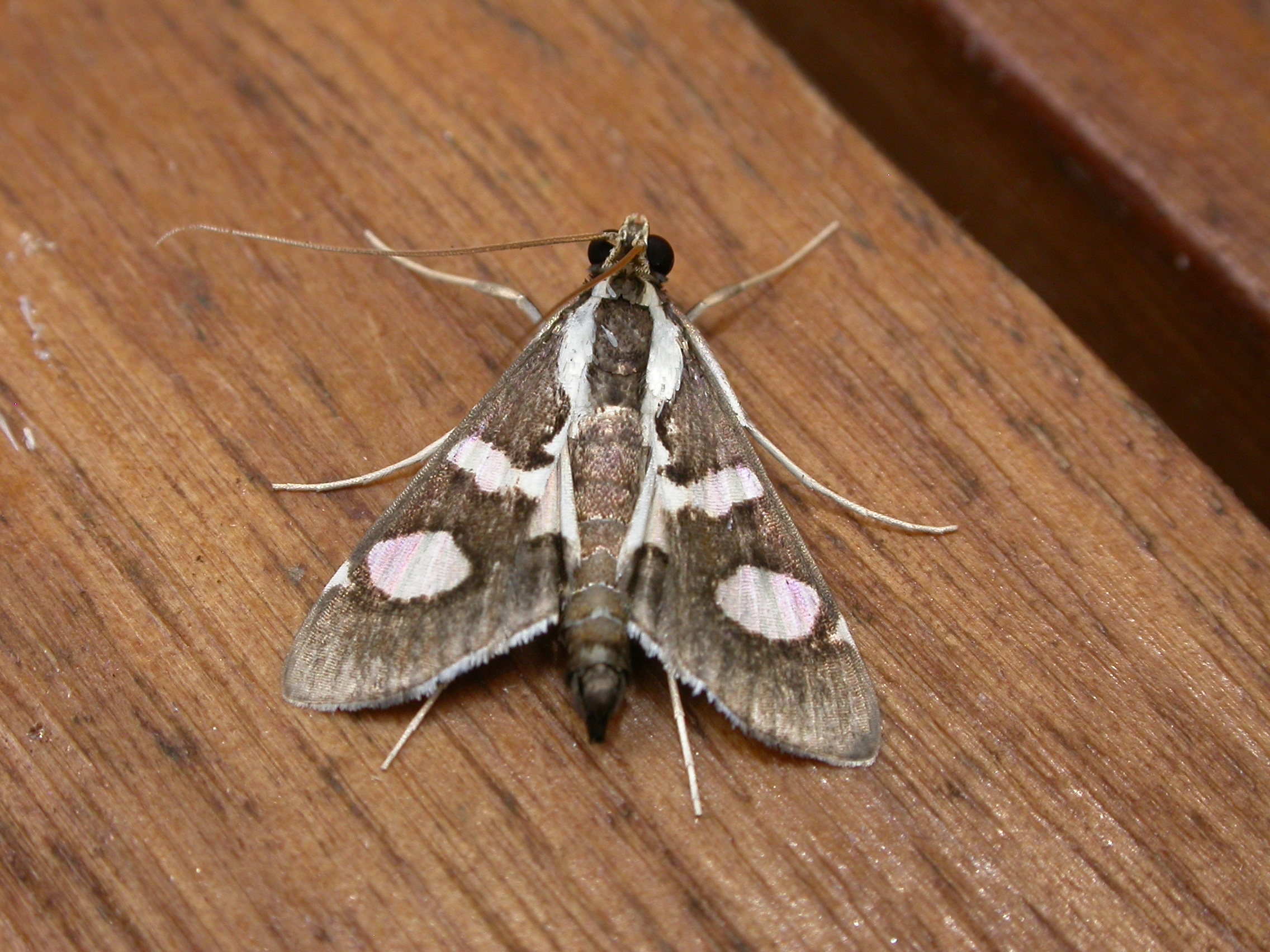

Scientific classification
- Kingdom: Animalia
- Phylum: Arthropoda
- Clade: Pancrustacea
- Class: Insecta
- Order: Lepidoptera
- Family: Crambidae
- Genus: Glyphodes
- Species: G. bicolor

Binomial name
- Glyphodes bicolor (Swainson, 1821)

Synonyms
- Botis bicolor Swainson, 1821; Glyphodes diurnalis Guenée, 1854; Glyphodes parvalis Walker, 1866; Eudioptis perspicillalis Zeller, 1852

= Glyphodes bicolor =

Species of moth

Glyphodes bicolor is a species of moth of the family Crambidae described by William Swainson in 1821. It is widely distributed in the Old World tropics, including South Africa, China, Thailand, India, New Guinea and Australia (the Northern Territory and Queensland).
