= Glyphodes heliconialis =

Scientific classification
- Kingdom: Animalia
- Phylum: Arthropoda
- Clade: Pancrustacea
- Class: Insecta
- Order: Lepidoptera
- Family: Crambidae
- Genus: Glyphodes
- Species: G. heliconialis

Binomial name
- Glyphodes heliconialis (Guenée, 1854)

Synonyms
- Hyalitis heliconialis Guenée, 1854

Species of moth

Glyphodes heliconialis is a moth in the family Crambidae. It was described by Achille Guenée in 1854. It is found in Venezuela, French Guiana and Jamaica.
