= Glyphodes aniferalis =

Scientific classification
- Kingdom: Animalia
- Phylum: Arthropoda
- Clade: Pancrustacea
- Class: Insecta
- Order: Lepidoptera
- Family: Crambidae
- Genus: Glyphodes
- Species: G. aniferalis

Binomial name
- Glyphodes aniferalis Hampson, 1909

Species of moth

Glyphodes aniferalis is a moth in the family Crambidae. It was described by George Hampson in 1909. It is found in South Africa and Uganda.
