= Glyphodes bipunctalis =

Scientific classification
- Kingdom: Animalia
- Phylum: Arthropoda
- Clade: Pancrustacea
- Class: Insecta
- Order: Lepidoptera
- Family: Crambidae
- Genus: Glyphodes
- Species: G. bipunctalis

Binomial name
- Glyphodes bipunctalis Leech, 1889

Species of moth

Glyphodes bipunctalis is a moth in the family Crambidae. It was described by John Henry Leech in 1889. It is found in Japan.
