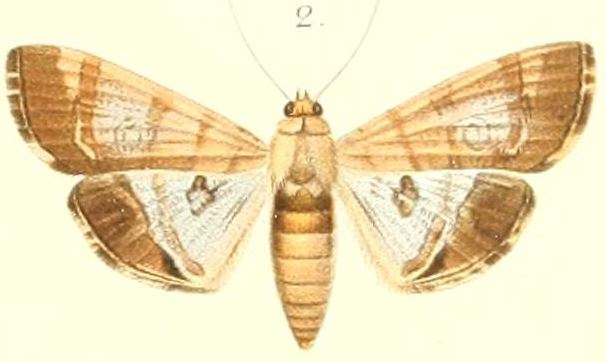

Scientific classification
- Kingdom: Animalia
- Phylum: Arthropoda
- Clade: Pancrustacea
- Class: Insecta
- Order: Lepidoptera
- Family: Crambidae
- Genus: Glyphodes
- Species: G. nitidaria

Binomial name
- Glyphodes nitidaria (Pagenstecher, 1899)

Synonyms
- Morocosma nitidaria Pagenstecher, 1899

= Glyphodes nitidaria =

Species of moth

Glyphodes nitidaria is a moth of the family Crambidae described by Arnold Pagenstecher in 1899. It is known from the Bismarck Archipelago of Papua New Guinea.
