= Glyphodes ernalis =

Scientific classification
- Kingdom: Animalia
- Phylum: Arthropoda
- Clade: Pancrustacea
- Class: Insecta
- Order: Lepidoptera
- Family: Crambidae
- Genus: Glyphodes
- Species: G. ernalis

Binomial name
- Glyphodes ernalis C. Swinhoe, 1894

Species of moth

Glyphodes ernalis is a moth in the family Crambidae. It was described by Charles Swinhoe in 1894. It is found in India.
