= Glyphodes aurantivittalis =

Scientific classification
- Kingdom: Animalia
- Phylum: Arthropoda
- Clade: Pancrustacea
- Class: Insecta
- Order: Lepidoptera
- Family: Crambidae
- Genus: Glyphodes
- Species: G. aurantivittalis

Binomial name
- Glyphodes aurantivittalis Munroe, 1960

Species of moth

Glyphodes aurantivittalis is a moth in the family Crambidae. It was described by Eugene G. Munroe in 1960. It is found on Sumatra in Indonesia.
