= Glyphodes convolvulalis =

Scientific classification
- Kingdom: Animalia
- Phylum: Arthropoda
- Clade: Pancrustacea
- Class: Insecta
- Order: Lepidoptera
- Family: Crambidae
- Genus: Glyphodes
- Species: G. convolvulalis

Binomial name
- Glyphodes convolvulalis (Sepp, 1848)

Synonyms
- Margaronia convolvulalis Sepp, 1848

Species of moth

Glyphodes convolvulalis is a moth in the family Crambidae. It was described by Sepp in 1848. It is found in Suriname.
