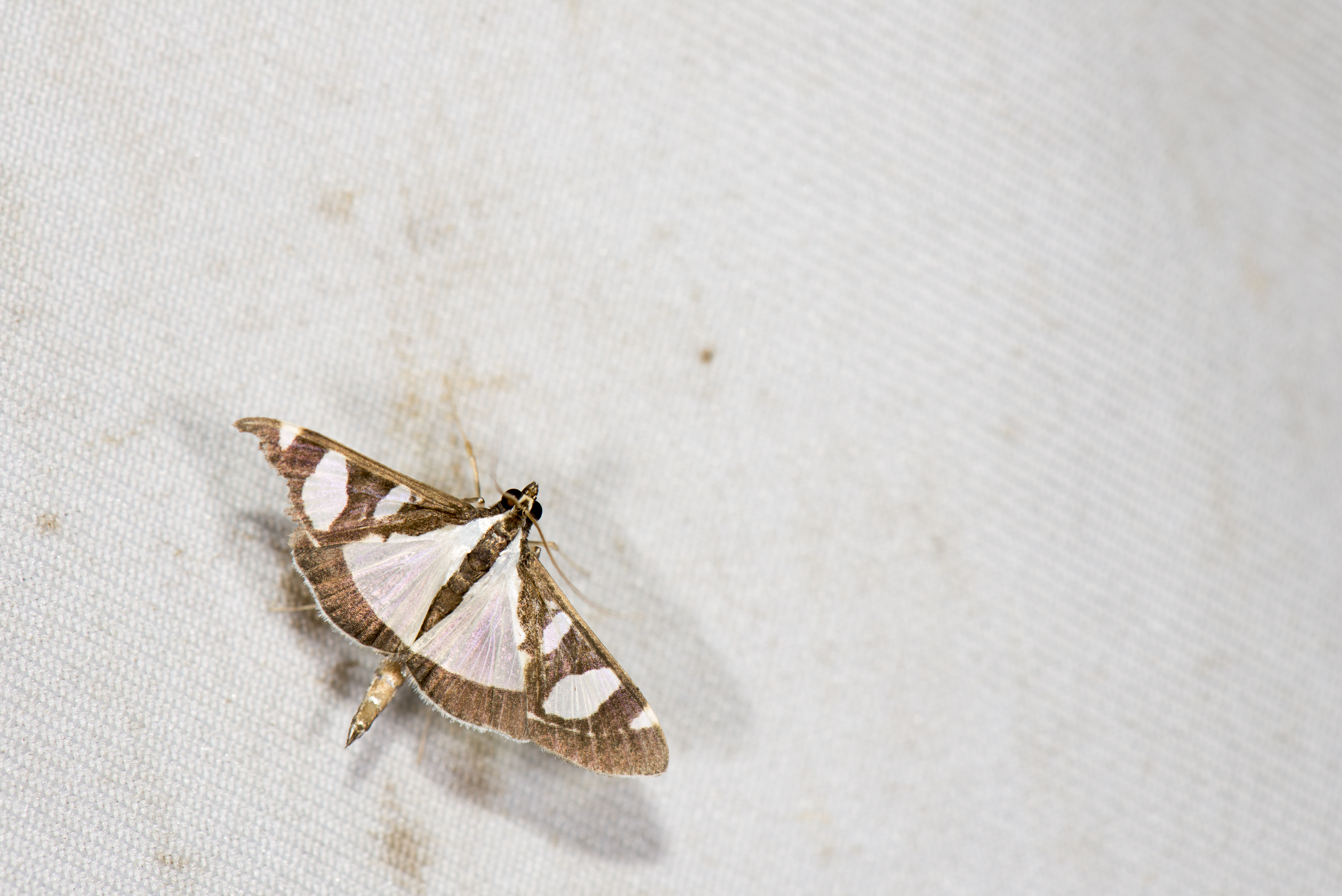

Scientific classification
- Kingdom: Animalia
- Phylum: Arthropoda
- Clade: Pancrustacea
- Class: Insecta
- Order: Lepidoptera
- Family: Crambidae
- Genus: Glyphodes
- Species: G. actorionalis

Binomial name
- Glyphodes actorionalis Walker, 1859

Synonyms
- Lypotigris jovialis C. Felder, R. Felder & Rogenhofer, 1875; Glyphodes zelleri Lederer, 1863

= Glyphodes actorionalis =

Species of moth

Glyphodes actorionalis is a moth in the family Crambidae. It was described by Francis Walker in 1859. It is found in Zambia, India and Indonesia (the Moluccas, Sulawesi).
