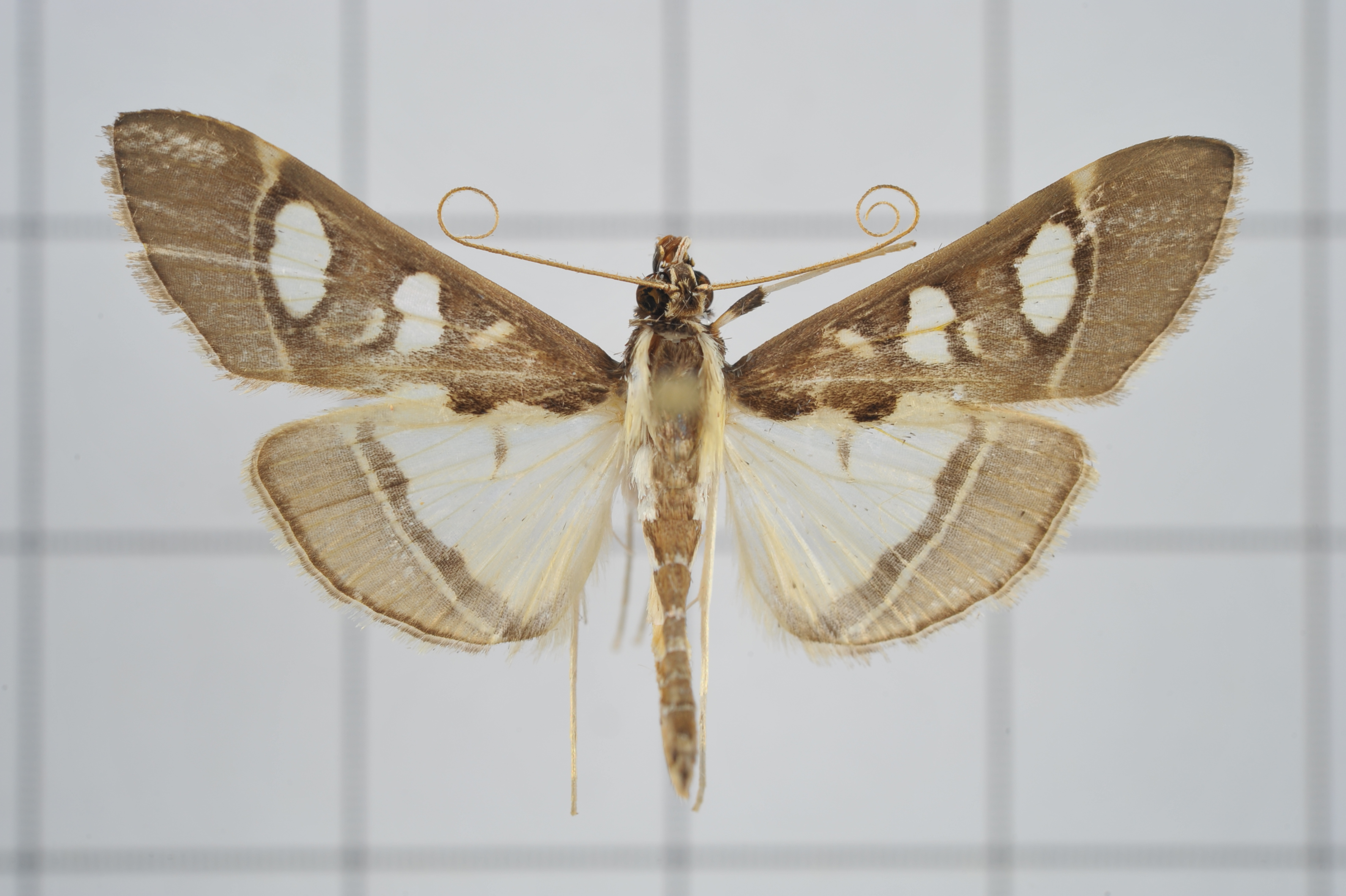

Scientific classification
- Kingdom: Animalia
- Phylum: Arthropoda
- Clade: Pancrustacea
- Class: Insecta
- Order: Lepidoptera
- Family: Crambidae
- Genus: Glyphodes
- Species: G. chilka

Binomial name
- Glyphodes chilka Moore, 1888

= Glyphodes chilka =

Species of moth

Glyphodes cyanomichla is a moth of the family Crambidae described by Frederic Moore in 1888. It is found in the Bengal region and in Taiwan.

This species has a wingspan of 37 mm.
