= Glyphodes bilunalis =

Scientific classification
- Kingdom: Animalia
- Phylum: Arthropoda
- Clade: Pancrustacea
- Class: Insecta
- Order: Lepidoptera
- Family: Crambidae
- Genus: Glyphodes
- Species: G. bilunalis

Binomial name
- Glyphodes bilunalis (Snellen, 1895)

Synonyms
- Nesarcha bilunalis Snellen, 1895; Margaronia cleonadalis Swinhoe, 1904

Species of moth

Glyphodes bilunalis is a moth in the family Crambidae. It was described by Snellen in 1895. It is found on Borneo and Java.
