= Glyphodes mesozona =

Scientific classification
- Kingdom: Animalia
- Phylum: Arthropoda
- Clade: Pancrustacea
- Class: Insecta
- Order: Lepidoptera
- Family: Crambidae
- Genus: Glyphodes
- Species: G. mesozona

Binomial name
- Glyphodes mesozona (Lower, 1901)

Synonyms
- Dysallacta mesozona

Species of moth

Glyphodes mesozona is a moth in the family Crambidae. It was described by Oswald Bertram Lower in 1901. It is found in Australia, where it has been recorded from Queensland.

The wingspan is about 28 mm. Head whitish. The forewings are iridescent whitish with fuscous markings. There is a moderately thick streak along the costa and a broad blackish-edged transverse fascia, as well as a fine subterminal line and a fine line along the termen. The hindwings iridescent whitish with fuscous markings. Adults have been recorded on wing in June.
