= Glyphodes summaperta =

Scientific classification
- Kingdom: Animalia
- Phylum: Arthropoda
- Clade: Pancrustacea
- Class: Insecta
- Order: Lepidoptera
- Family: Crambidae
- Genus: Glyphodes
- Species: G. summaperta

Binomial name
- Glyphodes summaperta (Dyar, 1925)

Synonyms
- Tegostoma summaperta Dyar, 1925

Species of moth

Glyphodes summaperta is a moth in the family Crambidae. It was described by Harrison Gray Dyar Jr. in 1925. It is found in Mexico.
