= Glyphodes subamicalis =

Scientific classification
- Kingdom: Animalia
- Phylum: Arthropoda
- Clade: Pancrustacea
- Class: Insecta
- Order: Lepidoptera
- Family: Crambidae
- Genus: Glyphodes
- Species: G. subamicalis

Binomial name
- Glyphodes subamicalis T. B. Fletcher, 1910

Species of moth

Glyphodes subamicalis is a moth in the family Crambidae. It was described by Thomas Bainbrigge Fletcher in 1910. It is found on the Seychelles, where it has been recorded from Mahé.
