= Glyphodes confiniodes =

Scientific classification
- Kingdom: Animalia
- Phylum: Arthropoda
- Clade: Pancrustacea
- Class: Insecta
- Order: Lepidoptera
- Family: Crambidae
- Genus: Glyphodes
- Species: G. confiniodes

Binomial name
- Glyphodes confiniodes Amsel, 1956

Species of moth

Glyphodes confiniodes is a moth in the family Crambidae. It was described by Hans Georg Amsel in 1956. It is found in Venezuela.
