= Glyphodes eudoxia =

Scientific classification
- Kingdom: Animalia
- Phylum: Arthropoda
- Clade: Pancrustacea
- Class: Insecta
- Order: Lepidoptera
- Family: Crambidae
- Genus: Glyphodes
- Species: G. eudoxia

Binomial name
- Glyphodes eudoxia J. F. G. Clarke, 1971

Species of moth

Glyphodes eudoxia is a moth in the family Crambidae. It was described by John Frederick Gates Clarke in 1971. It is found in French Polynesia, where it has been recorded from Rapa Iti.
