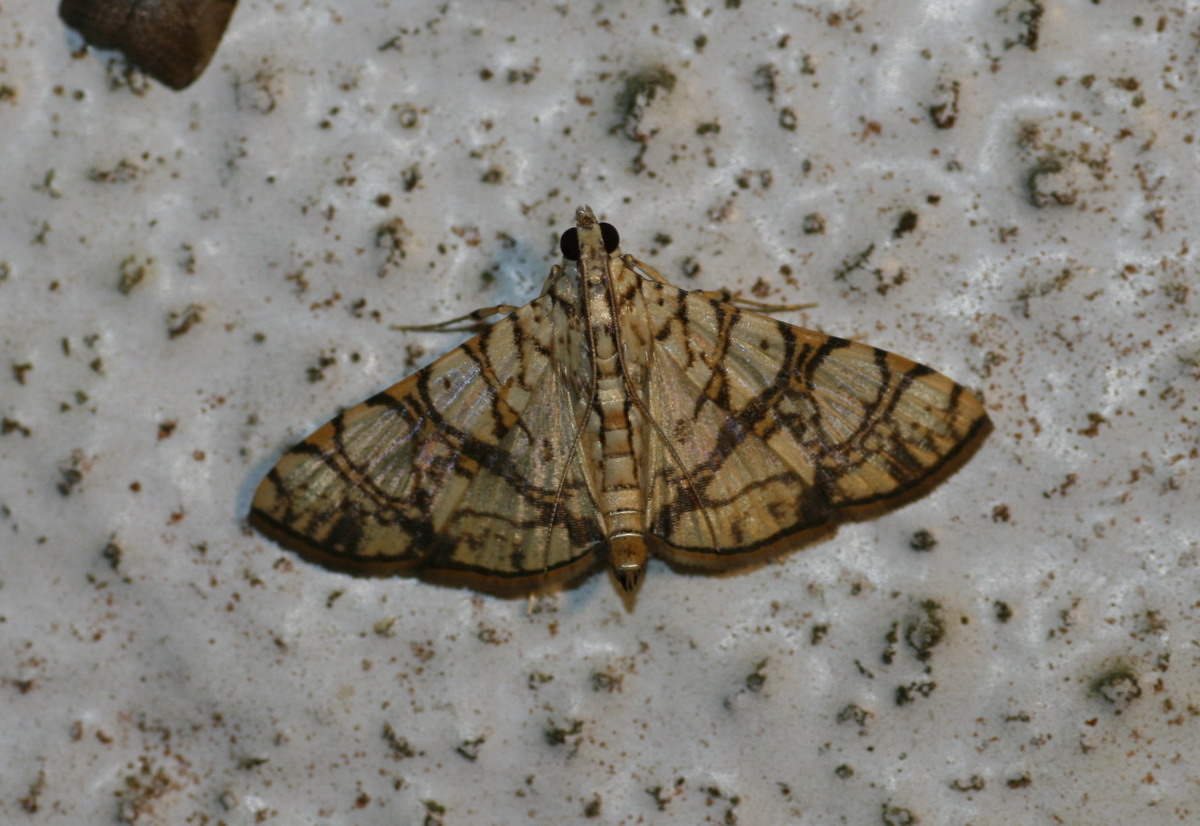

Scientific classification
- Kingdom: Animalia
- Phylum: Arthropoda
- Clade: Pancrustacea
- Class: Insecta
- Order: Lepidoptera
- Family: Crambidae
- Genus: Glyphodes
- Species: G. caesalis

Binomial name
- Glyphodes caesalis Walker, 1859

Synonyms
- Glyphodes assimilis Rothschild, 1915; Glyphodes analagoalis Rothschild, 1915

= Glyphodes caesalis =

Species of moth

Glyphodes caesalis is a moth in the family Crambidae. It was described by Francis Walker in 1859. It is found in Sri Lanka, mainland India, Myanmar, the Andaman Islands, New Guinea, Bangladesh, Fiji, Hong Kong, Thailand and Australia (Queensland).

The larvae feed on a range of Moraceae including Artocarpus rigida, Ficus carica, Artocarpus elastica and Artocarpus heterophyllus. It is sometimes called the jackfruit shoot and fruit borer. The species was sometimes placed in the genus Diaphania which is however a genus with more species in the Neotropics and feeding mainly on host plants in the Cucurbitaceae.
