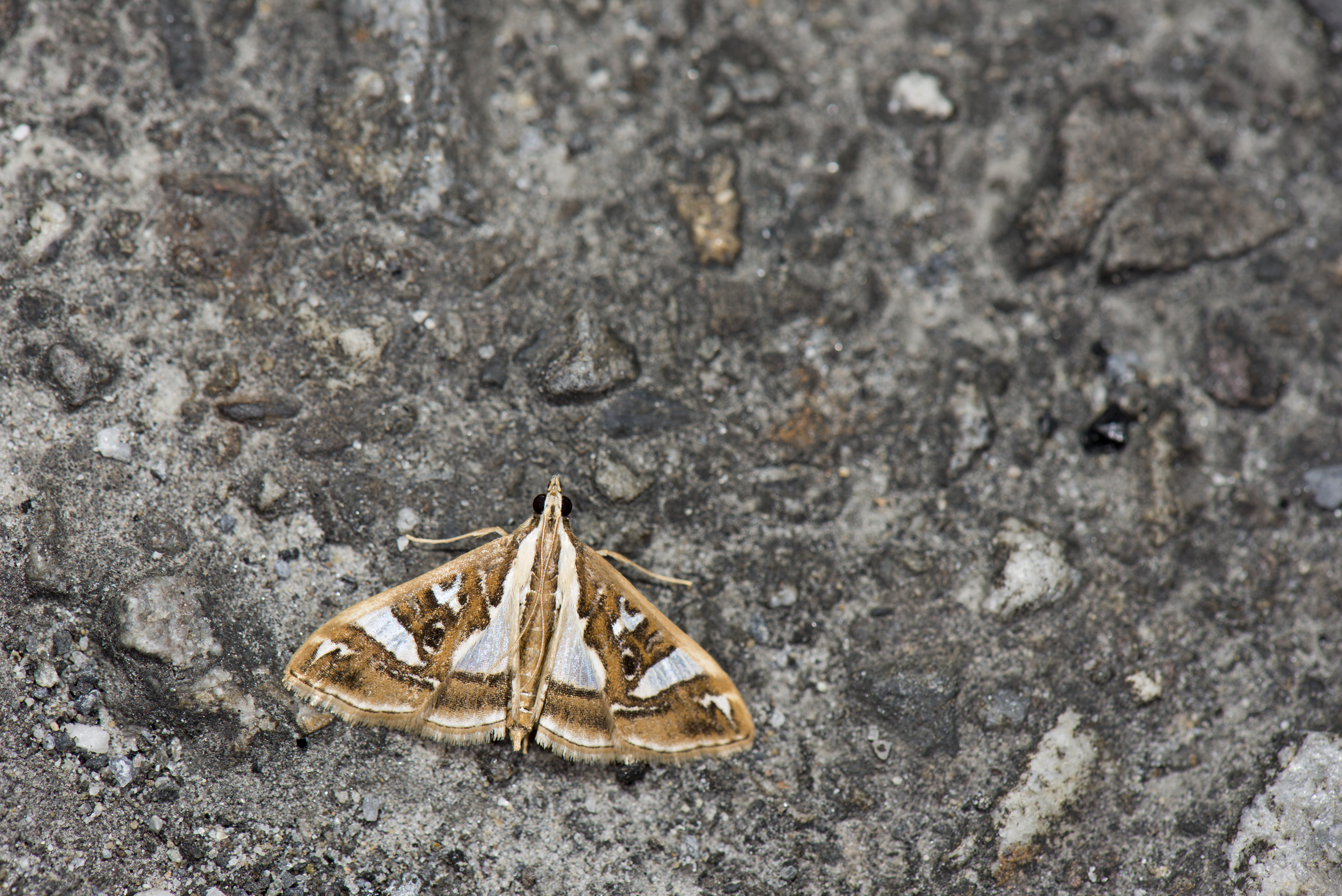

Scientific classification
- Kingdom: Animalia
- Phylum: Arthropoda
- Clade: Pancrustacea
- Class: Insecta
- Order: Lepidoptera
- Family: Crambidae
- Genus: Glyphodes
- Species: G. pyloalis

Binomial name
- Glyphodes pyloalis Walker, 1859

Synonyms
- Glyphodes sylpharis Butler, 1878

= Glyphodes pyloalis =

Species of moth

Glyphodes pyloalis, the lesser mulberry snout moth, lesser mulberry pyralid or beautiful glyphodes moth, is a moth in the family Crambidae. It was described by Francis Walker in 1859. It is found in Iran, China, Japan, India, Indonesia (Sumatra), Sri Lanka, Taiwan, the Democratic Republic of the Congo, Equatorial Guinea, Mozambique and North America, where it has been recorded from Florida, Maryland, North Carolina, South Carolina and Virginia.

The wingspan is about 20 mm.

The larvae are a pest of Morus species.
