= Glyphodes anomala =

Scientific classification
- Kingdom: Animalia
- Phylum: Arthropoda
- Clade: Pancrustacea
- Class: Insecta
- Order: Lepidoptera
- Family: Crambidae
- Genus: Glyphodes
- Species: G. anomala

Binomial name
- Glyphodes anomala Janse, 1928

Species of moth

Glyphodes anomala is a moth in the family Crambidae. It was described by Anthonie Johannes Theodorus Janse in 1928. It is found on New Guinea.
