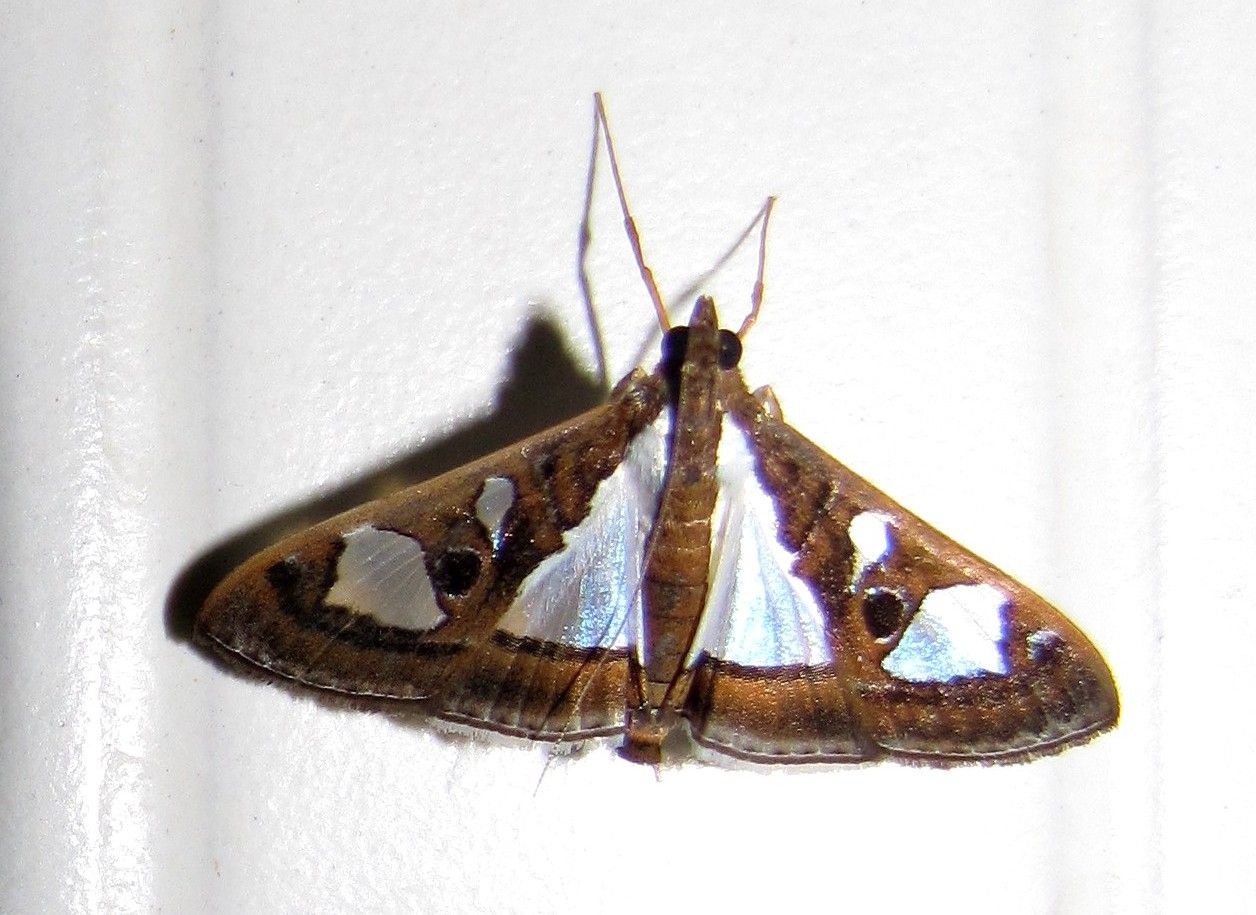

Scientific classification
- Kingdom: Animalia
- Phylum: Arthropoda
- Clade: Pancrustacea
- Class: Insecta
- Order: Lepidoptera
- Family: Crambidae
- Genus: Glyphodes
- Species: G. bivitralis

Binomial name
- Glyphodes bivitralis Guenée, 1854

Synonyms
- Diaphania bivitralis; Glyphodes alitalis Hulst, 1886; Morocosma alitalis

= Glyphodes bivitralis =

Species of moth

Glyphodes bivitralis is a moth of the family Crambidae described by Achille Guenée in 1854. It is native to south-east Asia, including Hong Kong, India, Japan, Taiwan and Thailand. It is also found in Queensland, Hawaii and Maldives.

The wingspan is about 30 mm (1.2 in).
