= Glyphodes vertumnalis =

Scientific classification
- Kingdom: Animalia
- Phylum: Arthropoda
- Clade: Pancrustacea
- Class: Insecta
- Order: Lepidoptera
- Family: Crambidae
- Genus: Glyphodes
- Species: G. vertumnalis

Binomial name
- Glyphodes vertumnalis (Guenée, 1854)

Synonyms
- Margarodes vertumnalis Guenée, 1854; Enchocnemidia fuscitibia Warren, 1896; Margaronia herbidalis Walker, [1866]; Margaronia melanuralis Walker, [1866]; Margaronia morvusalis Walker, 1859; Margaronia phryneusalis Walker, 1859; Margaronia proximalis Walker, 1866; Pachyarches tibialis Moore, 1877

Species of moth

Glyphodes vertumnalis is a moth in the family Crambidae. It was described by Achille Guenée in 1854. It is found in India and on Borneo.

Larvae have been recorded feeding on Alstonia scholaris.
