= Glyphodes chrysialis =

Scientific classification
- Kingdom: Animalia
- Phylum: Arthropoda
- Clade: Pancrustacea
- Class: Insecta
- Order: Lepidoptera
- Family: Crambidae
- Genus: Glyphodes
- Species: G. chrysialis

Binomial name
- Glyphodes chrysialis (Stoll, 1790)

Synonyms
- Phalaena Pyralis chrysialis Stoll, 1790; Glyphodes ectargyralis Hampson, 1899; Margaronia pentaphragma Meyrick, 1936

Species of moth

Glyphodes chrysialis is a moth in the family Crambidae. It was described by Stoll in 1790. It is found in the Democratic Republic of Congo (Equateur, West Kasai, Orientale), Gabon, Nigeria and South Africa.
