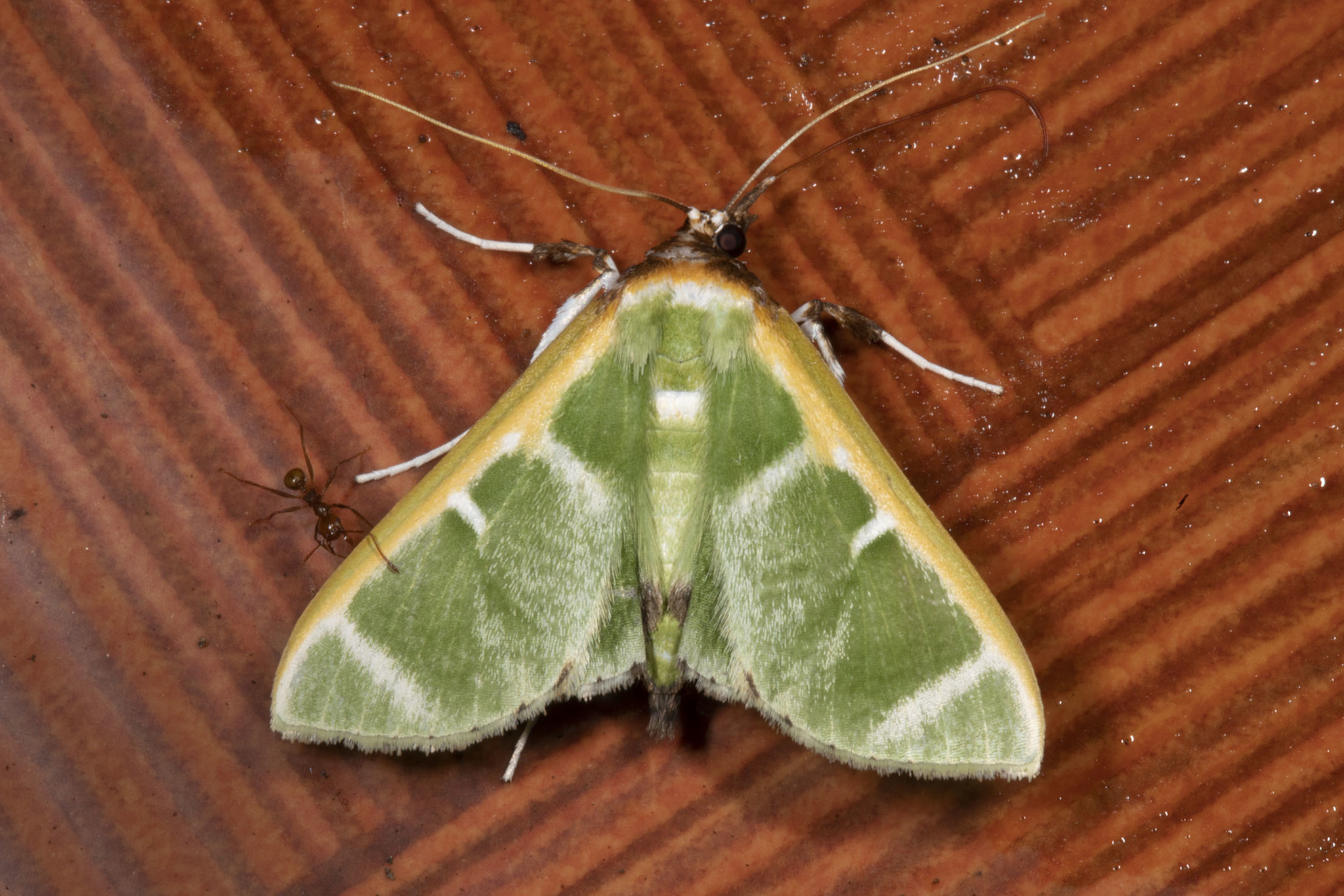

Scientific classification
- Kingdom: Animalia
- Phylum: Arthropoda
- Clade: Pancrustacea
- Class: Insecta
- Order: Lepidoptera
- Family: Crambidae
- Genus: Glyphodes
- Species: G. euchlorisalis

Binomial name
- Glyphodes euchlorisalis (Hampson, 1918)

Synonyms
- Margaronia euchlorisalis Hampson, 1918

= Glyphodes euchlorisalis =

Species of moth

Glyphodes euchlorisalis is a moth in the family Crambidae. It was described by George Hampson in 1918. It is found in Peru.
