= Glyphodes lacustralis =

Scientific classification
- Kingdom: Animalia
- Phylum: Arthropoda
- Clade: Pancrustacea
- Class: Insecta
- Order: Lepidoptera
- Family: Crambidae
- Genus: Glyphodes
- Species: G. lacustralis

Binomial name
- Glyphodes lacustralis Moore, 1867

Synonyms
- Margaronia salmenalis C. Swinhoe, 1906

Species of moth

Glyphodes lacustralis is a moth in the family Crambidae. It was described by Frederic Moore in 1867. It is found in India (Meghalaya, Bengal).
