= Glyphodes bitjealis =

Scientific classification
- Kingdom: Animalia
- Phylum: Arthropoda
- Clade: Pancrustacea
- Class: Insecta
- Order: Lepidoptera
- Family: Crambidae
- Genus: Glyphodes
- Species: G. bitjealis

Binomial name
- Glyphodes bitjealis Strand, 1920

Species of moth

Glyphodes bitjealis is a moth in the family Crambidae. It was described by Strand in 1920. It is found in Cameroon.
