= Glyphodes conjunctalis =

Scientific classification
- Kingdom: Animalia
- Phylum: Arthropoda
- Clade: Pancrustacea
- Class: Insecta
- Order: Lepidoptera
- Family: Crambidae
- Genus: Glyphodes
- Species: G. conjunctalis

Binomial name
- Glyphodes conjunctalis Walker, 1866

Synonyms
- Glyphodes ledereri Butler, 1884

Species of moth

Glyphodes conjunctalis is a moth in the family Crambidae. It was described by Francis Walker in 1866. It is found on the Sula Islands, Misool, New Guinea, Seram, Ambon Island and Australia (Queensland).

The wingspan is about 20 mm. The wings are black with white patches.
