= Glyphodes vagilinea =

Scientific classification
- Kingdom: Animalia
- Phylum: Arthropoda
- Clade: Pancrustacea
- Class: Insecta
- Order: Lepidoptera
- Family: Crambidae
- Genus: Glyphodes
- Species: G. vagilinea

Binomial name
- Glyphodes vagilinea Hampson, 1912

Synonyms
- Sylepta crucifera Rothschild, 1915

Species of moth

Glyphodes vagilinea is a moth in the family Crambidae. It was described by George Hampson in 1912. It is found in Papua New Guinea.
