= Glyphodes gaujonialis =

Scientific classification
- Kingdom: Animalia
- Phylum: Arthropoda
- Clade: Pancrustacea
- Class: Insecta
- Order: Lepidoptera
- Family: Crambidae
- Genus: Glyphodes
- Species: G. gaujonialis

Binomial name
- Glyphodes gaujonialis (Dognin, 1905)

Synonyms
- Cirrhochrista gaujonialis Dognin, 1905

Species of moth

Glyphodes gaujonialis is a moth in the family Crambidae. It was described by Paul Dognin in 1905. It is found in Colombia.
