= Glyphodes agathalis =

Scientific classification
- Kingdom: Animalia
- Phylum: Arthropoda
- Clade: Pancrustacea
- Class: Insecta
- Order: Lepidoptera
- Family: Crambidae
- Genus: Glyphodes
- Species: G. agathalis

Binomial name
- Glyphodes agathalis (Walker, 1859)

Synonyms
- Megaphysa agathalis Walker, 1859; Maragaronia silvicolalis Swinhoe, 1916

Species of moth

Glyphodes agathalis is a moth in the family Crambidae. It was described by Francis Walker in 1859. It is found on Sumatra and in New Guinea.
