= Glyphodes interruptalis =

Scientific classification
- Kingdom: Animalia
- Phylum: Arthropoda
- Clade: Pancrustacea
- Class: Insecta
- Order: Lepidoptera
- Family: Crambidae
- Genus: Glyphodes
- Species: G. interruptalis

Binomial name
- Glyphodes interruptalis (Amsel, 1950)

Synonyms
- Synclera interruptalis Amsel, 1950

Species of moth

Glyphodes interruptalis is a moth in the family Crambidae. It was described by Hans Georg Amsel in 1950. It is found in Iran.
