= Glyphodes diplocyma =

Scientific classification
- Kingdom: Animalia
- Phylum: Arthropoda
- Clade: Pancrustacea
- Class: Insecta
- Order: Lepidoptera
- Family: Crambidae
- Genus: Glyphodes
- Species: G. diplocyma

Binomial name
- Glyphodes diplocyma Hampson, 1912

Species of moth

Glyphodes diplocyma is a moth in the family Crambidae. It was described by George Hampson in 1912. It is found in Tonga in the southern Pacific Ocean.
