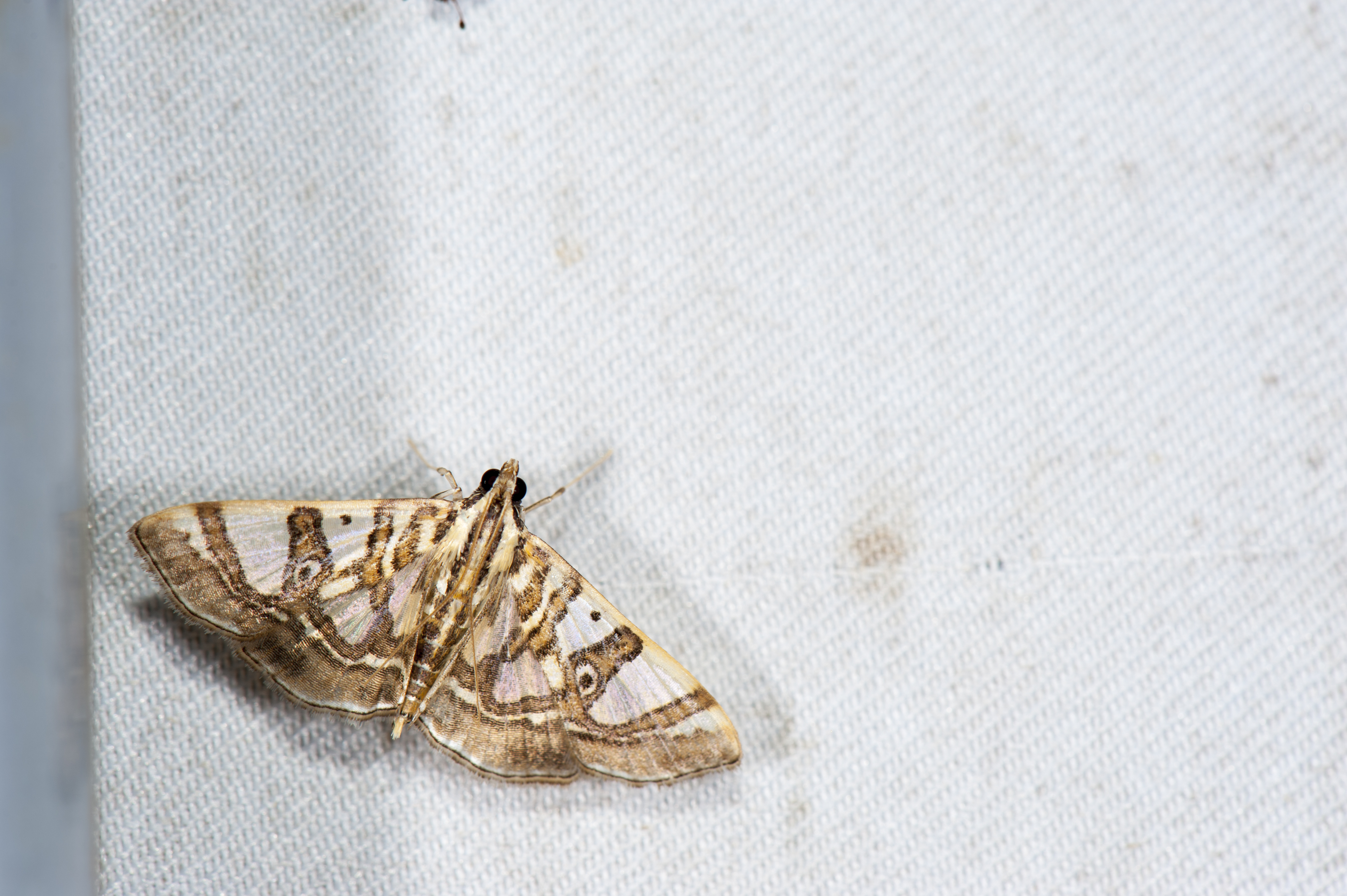

Scientific classification
- Kingdom: Animalia
- Phylum: Arthropoda
- Clade: Pancrustacea
- Class: Insecta
- Order: Lepidoptera
- Family: Crambidae
- Genus: Glyphodes
- Species: G. formosanus

Binomial name
- Glyphodes formosanus Shibuya, 1928

= Glyphodes formosanus =

Species of moth

Glyphodes formosanus is a moth in the family Crambidae. It was described by Shibuya in 1928. It is found in Taiwan.
