= Glyphodes sycina =

Scientific classification
- Kingdom: Animalia
- Phylum: Arthropoda
- Clade: Pancrustacea
- Class: Insecta
- Order: Lepidoptera
- Family: Crambidae
- Genus: Glyphodes
- Species: G. sycina

Binomial name
- Glyphodes sycina (Tams, 1941)

Synonyms
- Margaronia sycina Tams, 1941

Species of moth

Glyphodes sycina is a moth in the family Crambidae. It was described by Willie Horace Thomas Tams in 1941. It is found in Uganda.
