= Glyphodes proximalis =

Scientific classification
- Kingdom: Animalia
- Phylum: Arthropoda
- Clade: Pancrustacea
- Class: Insecta
- Order: Lepidoptera
- Family: Crambidae
- Genus: Glyphodes
- Species: G. proximalis

Binomial name
- Glyphodes proximalis Snellen, 1899

Species of moth

Glyphodes proximalis is a moth in the family Crambidae. It was described by Snellen in 1899. It is found in India (the Himalayas) and in Indonesia (Java).
