= Glyphodes militaris =

Scientific classification
- Kingdom: Animalia
- Phylum: Arthropoda
- Clade: Pancrustacea
- Class: Insecta
- Order: Lepidoptera
- Family: Crambidae
- Genus: Glyphodes
- Species: G. militaris

Binomial name
- Glyphodes militaris Munroe, 1976

Species of moth

Glyphodes militaris is a moth in the family Crambidae. It was described by Eugene G. Munroe in 1976. It is found on Borneo.
