= Glyphodes oriolalis =

Scientific classification
- Kingdom: Animalia
- Phylum: Arthropoda
- Clade: Pancrustacea
- Class: Insecta
- Order: Lepidoptera
- Family: Crambidae
- Genus: Glyphodes
- Species: G. oriolalis

Binomial name
- Glyphodes oriolalis Viette, 1958

Synonyms
- Diaphania oriolalis Viette, 1958

Species of moth

Glyphodes oriolalis is a moth of the family Crambidae. It is found on the Comoros (Grand Comoro).

Its wingspan is 29 millimetres (1.1 in), with a length of the forewings of 14 millimetres (0.55 in).
