= Glyphodes quadrimaculalis =

Scientific classification
- Kingdom: Animalia
- Phylum: Arthropoda
- Clade: Pancrustacea
- Class: Insecta
- Order: Lepidoptera
- Family: Crambidae
- Genus: Glyphodes
- Species: G. quadrimaculalis

Binomial name
- Glyphodes quadrimaculalis Bremer & Grey, 1853

Synonyms
- Glyphodes consocialis Lederer, 1863

Species of moth

Glyphodes quadrimaculalis is a moth in the family Crambidae. It was described by Otto Vasilievich Bremer and William Grey in 1853. It is found in China.
