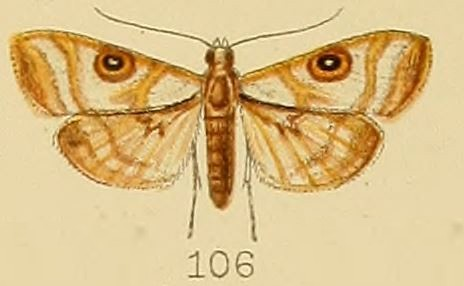

Scientific classification
- Kingdom: Animalia
- Phylum: Arthropoda
- Class: Insecta
- Order: Lepidoptera
- Family: Crambidae
- Genus: Glyphodes
- Species: G. megalopa

Binomial name
- Glyphodes megalopa (Meyrick, 1889)

Synonyms
- Glyphones megalopa Meyrick, 1889; Caprinia ocellalis Kenrick, 1907; Sylepta ocellifera Turner, 1937

= Dysallacta megalopa =

Species of moth

Dysallacta megalopa is a species of moth of the family Crambidae described by Edward Meyrick in 1889. It is found in Papua New Guinea and in Australia.

It has a wingspan of 27 mm.
