= Glyphodes lupinalis =

Scientific classification
- Kingdom: Animalia
- Phylum: Arthropoda
- Clade: Pancrustacea
- Class: Insecta
- Order: Lepidoptera
- Family: Crambidae
- Genus: Glyphodes
- Species: G. lupinalis

Binomial name
- Glyphodes lupinalis (Schaus, 1927)

Synonyms
- Margaronia lupinalis Schaus, 1927

Species of moth

Glyphodes lupinalis is a moth in the family Crambidae. It was described by Schaus in 1927. It is found in the Philippines (Luzon).
