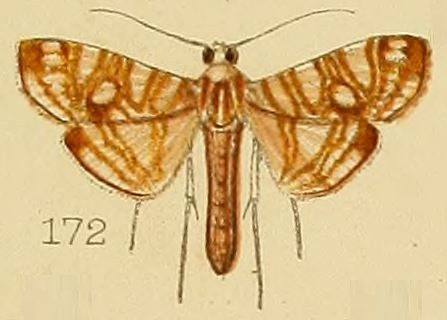

Scientific classification
- Kingdom: Animalia
- Phylum: Arthropoda
- Clade: Pancrustacea
- Class: Insecta
- Order: Lepidoptera
- Family: Crambidae
- Genus: Glyphodes
- Species: G. paucilinealis

Binomial name
- Glyphodes paucilinealis Kenrick, 1907

= Glyphodes paucilinealis =

Species of moth

Glyphodes paucilinealis is a species of moth of the family Crambidae. It was described by George Hamilton Kenrick in 1907 and is found in Papua New Guinea.

It has a wingspan of 24 mm.
