= Glyphodes bradleyi =

Scientific classification
- Kingdom: Animalia
- Phylum: Arthropoda
- Clade: Pancrustacea
- Class: Insecta
- Order: Lepidoptera
- Family: Crambidae
- Genus: Glyphodes
- Species: G. bradleyi

Binomial name
- Glyphodes bradleyi (Whalley, 1962)

Synonyms
- Margaronia bradleyi Whalley, 1962

Species of moth

Glyphodes bradleyi is a moth in the family Crambidae. It was described by George Hampson in 1909. It is found on Guadalcanal in the Solomon Islands.
