= Glyphodes terealis =

Scientific classification
- Kingdom: Animalia
- Phylum: Arthropoda
- Clade: Pancrustacea
- Class: Insecta
- Order: Lepidoptera
- Family: Crambidae
- Genus: Glyphodes
- Species: G. terealis

Binomial name
- Glyphodes terealis Walker, 1859

Synonyms
- Bocchoris terealis

Species of moth

Glyphodes terealis is a moth in the family Crambidae. It was described by Francis Walker in 1859. It is found on Borneo.
