= Glyphodes virginalis =

Scientific classification
- Kingdom: Animalia
- Phylum: Arthropoda
- Clade: Pancrustacea
- Class: Insecta
- Order: Lepidoptera
- Family: Crambidae
- Genus: Glyphodes
- Species: G. virginalis

Binomial name
- Glyphodes virginalis Rebel, 1915

Synonyms
- Agrioglypta virginalis

Species of moth

Glyphodes virginalis is a moth in the family Crambidae. It was described by Rebel in 1915. It is found on Samoa.
