= Glyphodes desmialis =

Scientific classification
- Kingdom: Animalia
- Phylum: Arthropoda
- Clade: Pancrustacea
- Class: Insecta
- Order: Lepidoptera
- Family: Crambidae
- Genus: Glyphodes
- Species: G. desmialis

Binomial name
- Glyphodes desmialis Mabille, 1900

Species of moth

Glyphodes desmialis is a moth in the family Crambidae. It was described by Paul Mabille in 1900. The type locality is unknown, but it is thought to originate from mainland Africa or Madagascar.
