= Glyphodes apiospila =

Scientific classification
- Kingdom: Animalia
- Phylum: Arthropoda
- Clade: Pancrustacea
- Class: Insecta
- Order: Lepidoptera
- Family: Crambidae
- Genus: Glyphodes
- Species: G. apiospila

Binomial name
- Glyphodes apiospila (Turner, 1922)

Synonyms
- Margaronia apiospila Turner, 1922

Species of moth

Glyphodes apiospila is a moth in the family Crambidae. It was described by Turner in 1922. It is found in Australia, where it has been recorded from Queensland.
