= Glyphodes inclusalis =

Scientific classification
- Kingdom: Animalia
- Phylum: Arthropoda
- Clade: Pancrustacea
- Class: Insecta
- Order: Lepidoptera
- Family: Crambidae
- Genus: Glyphodes
- Species: G. inclusalis

Binomial name
- Glyphodes inclusalis Gaede, 1917

Species of moth

Glyphodes inclusalis is a moth in the family Crambidae. It was described by Max Gaede in 1917. It is found in Tanzania.
