= Glyphodes callipona =

Scientific classification
- Kingdom: Animalia
- Phylum: Arthropoda
- Clade: Pancrustacea
- Class: Insecta
- Order: Lepidoptera
- Family: Crambidae
- Genus: Glyphodes
- Species: G. callipona

Binomial name
- Glyphodes callipona (Turner, 1908)

Synonyms
- Pagyda callipona Turner, 1908

Species of moth

Glyphodes callipona is a moth in the family Crambidae. It was described by Turner in 1908. It is found in Australia, where it has been recorded from Queensland.

Adults have translucent white wings with sinuous darker yellow bands.
