= Glyphodes grandisalis =

Scientific classification
- Kingdom: Animalia
- Phylum: Arthropoda
- Clade: Pancrustacea
- Class: Insecta
- Order: Lepidoptera
- Family: Crambidae
- Genus: Glyphodes
- Species: G. grandisalis

Binomial name
- Glyphodes grandisalis H. Druce, 1902

Species of moth

Glyphodes grandisalis is a moth in the family Crambidae. It was described by Herbert Druce in 1902. It is found in Venezuela and Ecuador.
