= Glyphodes difficilalis =

Scientific classification
- Kingdom: Animalia
- Phylum: Arthropoda
- Clade: Pancrustacea
- Class: Insecta
- Order: Lepidoptera
- Family: Crambidae
- Genus: Glyphodes
- Species: G. difficilalis

Binomial name
- Glyphodes difficilalis Strand, 1912

Species of moth

Glyphodes difficilalis is a moth in the family Crambidae. It was described by Strand in 1912. It is found in Togo.
