= Glyphodes phormingopa =

Scientific classification
- Kingdom: Animalia
- Phylum: Arthropoda
- Clade: Pancrustacea
- Class: Insecta
- Order: Lepidoptera
- Family: Crambidae
- Genus: Glyphodes
- Species: G. phormingopa

Binomial name
- Glyphodes phormingopa (Meyrick, 1934)

Synonyms
- Margaronia phormingopa Meyrick, 1934

Species of moth

Glyphodes phormingopa is a moth in the family Crambidae. It was described by Edward Meyrick in 1934. It is found on the Marquesas Archipelago in French Polynesia.
