= Glyphodes rotundalis =

Scientific classification
- Kingdom: Animalia
- Phylum: Arthropoda
- Clade: Pancrustacea
- Class: Insecta
- Order: Lepidoptera
- Family: Crambidae
- Genus: Glyphodes
- Species: G. rotundalis

Binomial name
- Glyphodes rotundalis (Snellen, 1901)

Synonyms
- Heterocnephes rotundalis Snellen, 1901

Species of moth

Glyphodes rotundalis is a moth in the family Crambidae. It was described by Snellen in 1901. It is found on Borneo.
