= Glyphodes praefulgida =

Scientific classification
- Kingdom: Animalia
- Phylum: Arthropoda
- Clade: Pancrustacea
- Class: Insecta
- Order: Lepidoptera
- Family: Crambidae
- Genus: Glyphodes
- Species: G. praefulgida

Binomial name
- Glyphodes praefulgida E. Hering, 1903

Synonyms
- Autocharis praefulgida

Species of moth

Glyphodes praefulgida is a moth in the family Crambidae. It was described by E. Hering in 1903. It is found in Mozambique.
