= Glyphodes viettealis =

Scientific classification
- Kingdom: Animalia
- Phylum: Arthropoda
- Clade: Pancrustacea
- Class: Insecta
- Order: Lepidoptera
- Family: Crambidae
- Genus: Glyphodes
- Species: G. viettealis

Binomial name
- Glyphodes viettealis (Marion, 1954)

Synonyms
- Diaphana viettealis Marion, 1954

Species of moth

Glyphodes viettealis is a moth in the family Crambidae. It was described by Hubert Marion in 1954. It is found on Madagascar.
