= Glyphodes rioalis =

Scientific classification
- Kingdom: Animalia
- Phylum: Arthropoda
- Clade: Pancrustacea
- Class: Insecta
- Order: Lepidoptera
- Family: Crambidae
- Genus: Glyphodes
- Species: G. rioalis

Binomial name
- Glyphodes rioalis (Schaus, 1920)

Synonyms
- Margaronia rioalis Schaus, 1920

Species of moth

Glyphodes rioalis is a moth in the family Crambidae. It was described by Schaus in 1920. It is found in Brazil (Rio de Janeiro).
