= Glyphodes quadristigmalis =

Scientific classification
- Kingdom: Animalia
- Phylum: Arthropoda
- Clade: Pancrustacea
- Class: Insecta
- Order: Lepidoptera
- Family: Crambidae
- Genus: Glyphodes
- Species: G. quadristigmalis

Binomial name
- Glyphodes quadristigmalis Kenrick, 1907

Species of moth

Glyphodes quadristigmalis is a moth in the family Crambidae. It was described by George Hamilton Kenrick in 1907. It is found on New Guinea.
