= Glyphodes pradolalis =

Scientific classification
- Kingdom: Animalia
- Phylum: Arthropoda
- Clade: Pancrustacea
- Class: Insecta
- Order: Lepidoptera
- Family: Crambidae
- Genus: Glyphodes
- Species: G. pradolalis

Binomial name
- Glyphodes pradolalis (Dognin, 1897)

Synonyms
- Margarodes pradolalis Dognin, 1897

Species of moth

Glyphodes pradolalis is a moth in the family Crambidae. It was described by Paul Dognin in 1897. It is found in Loja Province, Ecuador.
