= Glyphodes nigribasalis =

Scientific classification
- Kingdom: Animalia
- Phylum: Arthropoda
- Clade: Pancrustacea
- Class: Insecta
- Order: Lepidoptera
- Family: Crambidae
- Genus: Glyphodes
- Species: G. nigribasalis

Binomial name
- Glyphodes nigribasalis Caradja, 1925

Species of moth

Glyphodes nigribasalis is a moth in the family Crambidae. It was described by Aristide Caradja in 1925. It is found in China.
