= Glyphodes naralis =

Scientific classification
- Kingdom: Animalia
- Phylum: Arthropoda
- Clade: Pancrustacea
- Class: Insecta
- Order: Lepidoptera
- Family: Crambidae
- Genus: Glyphodes
- Species: G. naralis

Binomial name
- Glyphodes naralis C. Felder, R. Felder & Rogenhofer, 1875

Species of moth

Glyphodes naralis is a moth in the family Crambidae. It was described by Cajetan Felder, Rudolf Felder and Alois Friedrich Rogenhofer in 1875. It is found on Borneo.
