= Glyphodes serenalis =

Scientific classification
- Kingdom: Animalia
- Phylum: Arthropoda
- Clade: Pancrustacea
- Class: Insecta
- Order: Lepidoptera
- Family: Crambidae
- Genus: Glyphodes
- Species: G. serenalis

Binomial name
- Glyphodes serenalis Snellen, 1880

Species of moth

Glyphodes serenalis is a subspecies of moth in the family Crambidae. It was described by Snellen in 1880. It is found on Sulawesi.
