= Glyphodes lachesis =

Scientific classification
- Kingdom: Animalia
- Phylum: Arthropoda
- Clade: Pancrustacea
- Class: Insecta
- Order: Lepidoptera
- Family: Crambidae
- Genus: Glyphodes
- Species: G. lachesis

Binomial name
- Glyphodes lachesis Butler, 1882

Species of moth

Glyphodes lachesis is a moth in the family Crambidae. It was described by Arthur Gardiner Butler in 1882. It is found in Papua New Guinea.
