= Glyphodes prothymalis =

Scientific classification
- Kingdom: Animalia
- Phylum: Arthropoda
- Clade: Pancrustacea
- Class: Insecta
- Order: Lepidoptera
- Family: Crambidae
- Genus: Glyphodes
- Species: G. prothymalis

Binomial name
- Glyphodes prothymalis C. Swinhoe, 1892

Species of moth

Glyphodes prothymalis is a moth in the family Crambidae. It was described by Charles Swinhoe in 1892. It is found in Meghalaya, India.
