= Glyphodes cyanomichla =

Scientific classification
- Kingdom: Animalia
- Phylum: Arthropoda
- Clade: Pancrustacea
- Class: Insecta
- Order: Lepidoptera
- Family: Crambidae
- Genus: Glyphodes
- Species: G. cyanomichla

Binomial name
- Glyphodes cyanomichla (Meyrick, 1899)

Synonyms
- Margaronia cyanomichla Meyrick, 1899

Species of moth

Glyphodes cyanomichla, the blue glyphodes moth, is a moth of the family Crambidae. It is endemic to the Hawaiian islands of Kauai, Oahu, Molokai and Hawaii.

The larvae feed on cultivated mulberry and Pseudomorus brunoniana.
