= Glyphodes paramicalis =

Scientific classification
- Kingdom: Animalia
- Phylum: Arthropoda
- Clade: Pancrustacea
- Class: Insecta
- Order: Lepidoptera
- Family: Crambidae
- Genus: Glyphodes
- Species: G. paramicalis

Binomial name
- Glyphodes paramicalis Kenrick, 1917

Species of moth

Glyphodes paramicalis is a moth of the family Crambidae described by George Hamilton Kenrick in 1917. It is found in Madagascar.

Their wingspan is about 36 mm. Head, antennae, palpi and legs of this species are whitish. Thorax and abdomen are fuscous brown. The forewings are dark brown suffused with purple and with two semi-hyaline (almost glass-like) bands with violet reflections.
