= Glyphodes sanguimarginalis =

Scientific classification
- Kingdom: Animalia
- Phylum: Arthropoda
- Clade: Pancrustacea
- Class: Insecta
- Order: Lepidoptera
- Family: Crambidae
- Genus: Glyphodes
- Species: G. sanguimarginalis

Binomial name
- Glyphodes sanguimarginalis (Hampson, 1899)

Synonyms
- Sameodes sanguimarginalis Hampson, 1899

Species of moth

Glyphodes sanguimarginalis is a moth in the family Crambidae. It was described by George Hampson in 1899. It is found in Colombia.
