= Glyphodes pandectalis =

Scientific classification
- Kingdom: Animalia
- Phylum: Arthropoda
- Clade: Pancrustacea
- Class: Insecta
- Order: Lepidoptera
- Family: Crambidae
- Genus: Glyphodes
- Species: G. pandectalis

Binomial name
- Glyphodes pandectalis Snellen, 1895

Species of moth

Glyphodes pandectalis is a moth in the family Crambidae. It was described by Snellen in 1895. It is found on Sumatra.
