= Glyphodes metastictalis =

Scientific classification
- Kingdom: Animalia
- Phylum: Arthropoda
- Clade: Pancrustacea
- Class: Insecta
- Order: Lepidoptera
- Family: Crambidae
- Genus: Glyphodes
- Species: G. metastictalis

Binomial name
- Glyphodes metastictalis Hampson, 1899

Species of moth

Glyphodes metastictalis is a moth in the family Crambidae. It was described by George Hampson in 1899. It is found on Sulawesi in Indonesia.
