= Glyphodes xanthostola =

Scientific classification
- Kingdom: Animalia
- Phylum: Arthropoda
- Clade: Pancrustacea
- Class: Insecta
- Order: Lepidoptera
- Family: Crambidae
- Genus: Glyphodes
- Species: G. xanthostola

Binomial name
- Glyphodes xanthostola Hampson, 1910

Species of moth

Glyphodes xanthostola is a moth in the family Crambidae. It was described by George Hampson in 1910. It is found in Zambia.
