= Cynanchum angustifolium =

Scientific classification
- Kingdom: Plantae
- Clade: Tracheophytes
- Clade: Angiosperms
- Clade: Eudicots
- Clade: Asterids
- Order: Gentianales
- Family: Apocynaceae
- Genus: Funastrum
- Species: F. angustifolium

Binomial name
- Funastrum angustifolium (Pers.) Liede & Meve

Species of plant

Funastrum angustifolium (syn. Cynanchum angustifolium) is a plant species. Commonly known as the Gulf coast swallow-wort, it is a perennial dicot that grows in the southern United States as far west as Texas. It is in the Cynanchum genus and Apocynaceae family. A flowering vine, it produces white blossoms with greenish and yellow parts. A member of the milkweed family, it is a plant host for monarch butterflies and produces wind dispersed seed pods.
