= Glyphodes mascarenalis =

Scientific classification
- Kingdom: Animalia
- Phylum: Arthropoda
- Clade: Pancrustacea
- Class: Insecta
- Order: Lepidoptera
- Family: Crambidae
- Genus: Glyphodes
- Species: G. mascarenalis

Binomial name
- Glyphodes mascarenalis de Joannis, 1906

Species of moth

Glyphodes mascarenalis is a moth of the family Crambidae discovered by Joseph de Joannis in 1906. It is found in the Indian Ocean on the islands Comoros, Réunion, and Mauritius. It was first described in Descriptions de Lépidoptères nouveaux de l'ile Maurice.

== See also ==
- List of moths of Mauritius
- List of moths of Réunion
- List of moths of Comoros
