= List of moths of the Comoros =

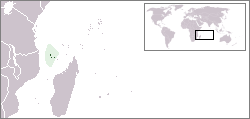
Location of the Comoros

Moths of the Comoros represent about 320 known moth species. The moths (mostly nocturnal) and butterflies (mostly diurnal) together make up the taxonomic order Lepidoptera.

This is a list of moth species which have been recorded on the Comoros and on Mayotte, which is geographically part of the Comoro Islands off the south-east coast of Africa.

== Arctiidae ==
- Amerila vitrea Plötz, 1880
- Argina astrea (Drury, 1773)
- Chiromachla insulare (Boisduval, 1833)
- Chiromachla pallescens Oberthür, 1890
- Cyana tripuncta (Toulgoët, 1980)
- Detoulgoetia comorensis Rothschild, 1933
- Detoulgoetia pseudosparsata Rothschild, 1933
- Eilema catenata (Mabille, 1900)
- Eilema comorensis Toulgoët, 1955
- Eilema humbloti Toulgoët, 1956
- Eilema kingdoni (Butler, 1877)
- Euchromia folletii (Guérin-Méneville, 1832)
- Exilisia insularis Tougoët, 1972
- Exilisia leighi (Toulgoët, 1956)
- Exilisia quadripunctata (Toulgoët, 1956)
- Exilisia variegata Toulgoët, 1972
- Fodinoidea pupieri Toulgoët, 1972
- Galtara colettae Toulgoët, 1976
- Galtara extensa (Butler, 1880)
- Leucaloa infragyrea (Saalmüller, 1891)
- Mimulosia quadripunctaria (Toulgoët, 1956)
- Neuroxena rectilineata (Toulgoët, 1972)
- Nyctemera insulare (Boisduval, 1833)
- Nyctemera pallescens Oberthür, 1890
- Pelosia stictigramma (Hampson, 1908)
- Podomachla virgo (Strand, 1909)
- Proxhyle comoreana Toulgoët, 1959
- Siccia punctipennis (Wallengren, 1860)
- Spatulosia griveaudi Toulgoët, 1972
- Thumatha fuscescens Walker, 1866
- Utetheisa elata (Fabricius, 1798)
- Utetheisa pulchella (Linnaeus, 1758)
- Viettesia bicolor Toulgoët, 1980
- Viettesia matilei Toulgoët, 1978

== Carposinidae ==
- Carposina impavida Meyrick, 1913

== Copromorphidae ==
- Copromorpha aeruginea Meyrick, 1917
- Copromorpha cryptochlora Meyrick, 1930
- Copromorpha mesobactra Meyrick, 1930

== Crambidae ==
- Agathodes musivalis Guenée, 1854
- Agathodes ostentalis (Geyer, 1837)
- Ambia prolalis Viette, 1958
- Angustalius hapaliscus (Zeller, 1852)
- Angustalius malacellus (Duponchel, 1836)
- Antigastra catalaunalis (Duponchel, 1833)
- Bocchoris putrisalis (Viette, 1958)
- Bradina admixtalis (Walker, 1859)
- Bradina atralis (Pagenstecher, 1907)
- Cadarena sinuata (Fabricius, 1781)
- Chabulina putrisalis (Viette, 1958)
- Chilo partellus (Swinhoe, 1886)
- Chilo sacchariphagus (Bojer, 1856)
- Cirrhochrista griveaudalis Viette, 1961
- Cnaphalocrocis poeyalis (Boisduval, 1833)
- Conotalis nigroradians (Mabille, 1900)
- Coptobasoides comoralis Viette, 1960
- Coptobasoides djadjoualis Viette, 1981
- Cotachena octoguttalis (Felder & Rogenhofer, 1875)
- Crocidolomia pavonana (Fabricius, 1794)
- Crocidophora caffralis Hampson, 1910
- Crocidophora elongalis Viette, 1978
- Diaphana indica (Saunders, 1851)
- Diaphania oriolalis (Viette, 1958)
- Dipleurinodes comorensis Leraut, 1989
- Dipleurinodes nigra Leraut, 1989
- Epipagis cancellalis (Zeller, 1852)
- Euchromius mythus Błeszyński, 1970
- Eudipleurina viettei Leraut, 1989
- Euphyciodes albotessulalis (Mabille, 1900)
- Eurrhyparodes tricoloralis (Zeller, 1852)
- Ghesquierellana hirtusalis (Walker, 1859)
- Glyphodes boseae Saalmüller, 1880
- Glyphodes capensis (Walker, 1866)
- Glyphodes mascarenalis de Joannis, 1906
- Glyphodes oriolalis (Viette, 1958)
- Glyphodes mayottalis Hampson, 1908
- Glyphodes shafferorum Viette, 1987
- Glyphodes stolalis Guenée, 1854
- Goniorhynchus argyropalis (Hampson, 1908)
- Haimbachia leucopleuralis (Mabille, 1900)
- Haritalodes derogata (Fabricius, 1775)
- Hellula undalis (Fabricius, 1781)
- Hendecasis duplifascialis (Hampson, 1891)
- Herpetogramma bipunctalis (Fabricius, 1794)
- Herpetogramma brunnealis (Hampson, 1913)
- Hodebertia testalis (Fabricius, 1794)
- Hyalobathra filalis (Guenée, 1854)
- Hydriris ornatalis (Duponchel, 1832)
- Hymenia perspectalis (Hübner, 1796)
- Ischnurges lancinalis (Guenée, 1854)
- Isocentris retinalis (Saalmüller, 1880)
- Lamprosema argyropalis (Hampson, 1908)
- Leucinodes hemichionalis (Mabille, 1900)
- Nausinoe capensis (Walker, 1866)
- Neurophyseta comoralis (Strand, 1916)
- Nomophila noctuella ([Denis & Schiffermüller], 1775)
- Notarcha quaternalis (Zeller, 1852)
- Omiodes indicata (Fabricius, 1775)
- Palpita metallata (Fabricius, 1781)
- Palpita vitrealis (Rossi, 1794)
- Parapoynx fluctuosalis (Zeller, 1852)
- Pardomima zanclophora Martin, 1955
- Parotis ankaratralis (Marion, 1954)
- Parotis malagasa (Strand, 1912)
- Parotis prasinalis (Saalmüller, 1880)
- Patissa ochreipalpalis Hampson, 1919
- Pioneabathra olesialis (Walker, 1859)
- Pleuroptya balteata (Fabricius, 1798)
- Pyrausta bouveti Viette, 1981
- Pyrausta olesialis (Walker, 1859)
- Pyrausta phaenicealis (Hübner, 1818)
- Sameodes cancellalis (Zeller, 1852)
- Scirpophaga gilviberbis Zeller, 1863
- Spoladea recurvalis (Fabricius, 1775)
- Stemorrhages sericea (Drury, 1773)
- Stenochora lancinalis (Guenée, 1854)
- Syllepte melanopalis Hampson, 1908
- Syllepte patagialis (Zeller, 1852)
- Syllepte undulalis (Pagenstecher, 1907)
- Udea ferrugalis (Hübner, 1796)
- Ulopeza primalis Viette, 1958
- Zebronia phenice (Cramer, 1780)
- Zebronia virginalis Viette, 1958

== Drepanidae ==
- Archidrepana saturniata Warren, 1902

== Elachistidae ==
- Agonopterix nyctalopis (Meyrick, 1930)
- Ethmia ampanella Viette, 1976
- Ethmia comoriensis Viette, 1963

== Euteliidae ==
- Eutelia bouveti Viette, 1984
- Eutelia galleyi Viette, 1984
- Eutelia verini Viette, 1984

== Gelechiidae ==
- Brachmia convolvuli Walsingham, 1907
- Dichomeris acuminatus (Staudinger, 1876)

== Geometridae ==
- Agathia malgassa Herbulot, 1978
- Antitrygodes herbuloti Viette, 1977
- Antitrygodes malagasy Viette, 1977
- Archichlora ioannis Herbulot, 1954
- Ascotis reciprocaria (Walker, 1860)
- Ascotis selenaria ([Denis & Schiffermüller], 1775)
- Asthenotricha torata L. B. Prout, 1932
- Cabera humbloti Herbulot, 1978
- Cabera toulgoeti Herbulot, 1956
- Chiasmia crassilembaria (Mabille, 1880)
- Chiasmia normata (Walker, 1861)
- Chiasmia simplicilinea (Pagenstecher, 1907)
- Chloroclystis comorana Herbulot, 1978
- Chloroclystis consocer Prout, 1937
- Chloroclystis grisea Warren, 1897
- Chloroclystis nanula (Mabille, 1900)
- Chloroclystis taxata Herbulot, 1981
- Chloroclystis toreumata L. B. Prout, 1937
- Chrysocraspeda erythraria (Mabille, 1893)
- Cleora angustivalvis (Herbulot, 1965)
- Cleora quadrimaculata (Janse, 1932)
- Cleora rothkirchi (Strand, 1914)
- Cleora transversaria (Pagenstecher, 1907)
- Collix foraminata Guenée, 1858
- Colocleora comoraria (Oberthür, 1913)
- Comibaena leucochloraria (Mabille, 1880)
- Comibaena punctaria (Swinhoe, 1904)
- Comostolopsis convalescens Herbulot, 1981
- Comostolopsis intensa Prout, 1915
- Darisodes orygaria (Guenée, 1862)
- Disclisioprocta natalata (Walker, 1862)
- Drepanogynis quadrivalvis Herbulot, 1960
- Drepanogynis unilineata (Warren, 1897)
- Ecpetala nesaea (Prout, 1923)
- Epigynopteryx duboisi Herbulot, 1981
- Erastria madecassaria (Boisduval, 1833)
- Eucrostes disparata Walker, 1861
- Eupithecia alticomora Herbulot, 1981
- Eupithecia bolespora L. B. Prout, 1937
- Eupithecia ericeti Herbulot, 1970
- Eupithecia exheres Herbulot, 1954
- Gymnoscelis olsoufieffae L. B. Prout, 1937
- Gymnoscelis rubricata (de Joannis, 1932)
- Heterorachis insueta L. B. Prout, 1922
- Horisme albostriata (Pagenstecher, 1907)
- Idaea griveaudi Herbulot, 1978
- Idaea pulveraria (Snellen, 1872)
- Idiochlora approximans (Warren, 1897)
- Isturgia catalaunaria (Guenée, 1858)
- Isturgia comorensis Krüger, 2001
- Isturgia contexta (Saalmüller, 1891)
- Isturgia deerraria (Walker, 1861)
- Isturgia univirgaria (Mabille, 1880)
- Lophorrhachia rubricorpus (Warren, 1898)
- Mimoclystia dimorpha Herbulot, 1966
- Obolcola retorta Herbulot, 1966
- Ochroplutodes hova Herbulot, 1954
- Orthonama quadrisecta Herbulot, 1954
- Phaiogramma stibolepida (Butler, 1879)
- Pingasa griveaudi Herbulot, 1966
- Pingasa rhadamaria (Guenée, 1858)
- Pingasa ultrata Herbulot, 1966
- Problepsis meroearia Saalmüller, 1884
- Protosteira spectabilis (Warren, 1899)
- Psilocerea ferruginaria (Mabille, 1898)
- Psilocerea harmonia Prout, 1932
- Psilocerea psegma Herbulot, 1981
- Psilocerea russulata (Mabille, 1898)
- Racotis deportata Herbulot, 1970
- Racotis squalida (Butler, 1878)
- Rhodesia alboviridata (Saalmüller, 1880)
- Scardamia maculata Warren, 1897
- Scopula bistrigata (Pagenstecher, 1907)
- Scopula caesaria (Walker, 1861)
- Scopula cornishi Prout, 1932
- Scopula internataria (Walker, 1861)
- Scopula lactaria (Walker, 1861)
- Scopula minorata (Boisduval, 1833)
- Scopula rebaptisa Herbulot, 1985
- Scopula rufolutaria (Mabille, 1900)
- Somatina lia Prout, 1915
- Somatina vestalis (Butler, 1875)
- Terina charmione (Fabricius, 1793)
- Thalassodes progressa Prout, 1926
- Thalassodes quadraria Guenée, 1857
- Traminda obversata (Walker, 1861)
- Xanthorhoe incudina Herbulot, 1981
- Xenimpia crassipecten Herbulot, 1961
- Xenimpia luxuriosa Herbulot, 1961
- Xenimpia maculosata (Warren, 1897)
- Xenimpia trizonata (Saalmüller, 1891)
- Xylopteryx doto Prout, 1925
- Zamarada differens Bastelberger, 1907

== Immidae ==
- Bryonympha silvana Meyrick, 1930
- Imma infima Meyrick, 1930

== Lasiocampidae ==
- Phoenicladocera lajonquierei Viette, 1981

== Lecithoceridae ==
- Lecithocera malacta Meyrick, 1918
- Odites analogica Meyrick, 1917
- Odites carcharopa Meyrick, 1914
- Odites fructuosa Meyrick, 1915
- Odites hermatica Meyrick, 1915
- Odites pedicata Meyrick, 1914

== Limacodidae ==
- Macrosemyra duberneti Viette, 1980

== Metarbelidae ==
- Salagena ngazidya Viette, 1981

== Noctuidae & Erebidae ==
=== Aganainae ===
- Asota borbonica (Boisduval, 1833)
- Asota comorana (Aurivillius, 1909)
- Asota fereunicolor (Toulgoët, 1972)
- Calpoparia imparepunctata (Oberthür, 1890)
- Sommeria sagittata Gaede, 1926

== Erebidae ==
- Achaea catella Guenée, 1852
- Achaea diplographa Hampson, 1913
- Achaea lienardi (Boisduval, 1833)
- Anomis alluaudi Viette, 1965
- Anomis auragoides (Guenée, 1852)
- Anomis flava (Fabricius, 1775)
- Anticarsia rubricans (Boisduval, 1833)
- Cyligramma fluctuosa (Drury, 1773)
- Cyligramma latona (Cramer, 1775)
- Dysgonia angularis (Boisduval, 1833)
- Dysgonia subangularis (Mabille, 1890)
- Dysgonia torrida (Guenée, 1852)
- Entomogramma pardus Guenée, 1852
- Erebus walkeri (Butler, 1875)
- Ericeia albangula (Saalmüller, 1880)
- Ericeia congregata (Walker, 1858)
- Ericeia lituraria (Saalmüller, 1880)
- Eublemmoides apicimacula (Mabille, 1880)
- Gracilodes caffra Guenée, 1852
- Gracilodes nysa Guenée, 1852
- Grammodes bifasciata (Petagna, 1787)
- Grammodes stolida (Fabricius, 1775)
- Hydrillodes carayoni Viette, 1981
- Hypena grandecomorensis Lödl, 1994
- Hypena griveaudi Viette, 1968
- Hypena obacerralis Walker, [1859]
- Hypena ophiusinalis Mabille, 1879
- Hypena polycyma Hampson, 1902
- Hypena puncticosta Prout, 1921
- Hypena neoplyta Prout, 1925
- Hypena varialis Walker, 1866
- Maxera marchalii (Boisduval, 1833)
- Mocis conveniens (Walker, 1858)
- Mocis frugalis (Fabricius, 1775)
- Mocis mayeri (Boisduval, 1833)
- Mocis proverai Zilli, 2000
- Tolna sypnoides (Butler, 1878)
- Trigonodes hyppasia (Cramer, 1779)

== Lymantriinae ==
- Creagra comorensis Collenette, 1937
- Euproctis producta (Walker, 1863)
- Euproctis mayottensis Collenette, 1956
- Marblepsis mayotta (Collenette, 1931)
- Ogoa oberthueri Rothschild, 1916
- Olapa tavetensis (Holland, 1892)

=== other families ===
- Acontia microptera Mabille, 1879
- Agrotis ipsilon (Hufnagel, 1766)
- Agrotis longidentifera (Hampson, 1903)
- Agrotis radama Viette, 1958
- Aletia infrargyrea (Saalmüller, 1891)
- Aletia pyrausta (Hampson, 1913)
- Aletia viettei (Rungs, 1956)
- Amyna axis Guenée, 1852
- Ancarista laminifera (Saalmüller, 1878)
- Apospasta verini Viette, 1981
- Argyrogramma signata (Fabricius, 1775)
- Athetis ignava (Guenée, 1852)
- Brithys crini (Fabricius, 1775)
- Callixena versicolora Saalmüller, 1891
- Callopistria maillardi (Guenée, 1862)
- Chalciope delta (Boisduval, 1833)
- Chasmina malagasy Viette, 1965
- Chrysodeixis chalcites (Esper, 1789)
- Coelophoris comorensis Viette, 1981
- Condica conducta (Walker, 1857)
- Condica pauperata (Walker, 1858)
- Conservula cinisigna de Joannis, 1906
- Conservula malagasa (Gaede, 1915)
- Ctenoplusia furcifera (Walker, 1857)
- Ctenoplusia limbirena (Guenée, 1852)
- Eudocima fullonia (Clerck, 1764)
- Helicoverpa armigera (Hübner, [1808])
- Leucania insulicola Guenée, 1852
- Leucania simplaria Saalmüller, 1891
- Mabilleana pudens (Mabille, 1900)
- Megalonycta mediovitta (Rothschild, 1924)
- Mentaxya ignicollis (Walker, 1857)
- Nagia linteola (Guenée, 1852)
- Nesaegocera comorana (Jordan, 1926)
- Ophiusa finifascia (Walker, 1858)
- Ophiusa legendrei Viette, 1967
- Plusiopalpa dichora Holland, 1894
- Polydesma umbricola Boisduval, 1833
- Rhesala moestalis (Walker, 1866)
- Sesamia calamistis Hampson, 1910
- Simplicia extinctalis (Zeller, 1852)
- Spodoptera littoralis (Boisduval, 1833)
- Spodoptera mauritia (Boisduval, 1833)
- Thysanoplusia indicator (Walker, [1858])
- Tracheplexia galleyi Viette, 1981
- Trichoplusia orichalcea (Fabricius, 1775)

== Nolidae ==
- Earias biplaga Walker, 1866
- Earias gigas Berio, 1956
- Earias insulana (Boisduval, 1833)
- Gabala grjebinella (Viette, 1956)
- Meganola praefica (Saalmüller, 1884)
- Meganola saalmuelleri (Toulgoët, 1961)
- Nola biangulata (Toulgoët, 1954)
- Pardoxia graellsii (Feisthamel, 1837)

== Notodontidae ==
- Malgadonta anjouanica Kiriakoff, 1969
- Nesochadisra protea Kiriakoff, 1969

== Oecophoridae ==
- Xenophanta ecliptis Meyrick, 1914

== Psychidae ==
- Oiketicus saclavus Mabille, 1890
- Pseudometisa alba (Janse, 1917)

== Pterophoridae ==
- Exelastis crudipennis (Meyrick, 1932)
- Exelastis luqueti (Gibeaux, 1994)
- Exelastis phlyctaenias (Meyrick, 1911
- Exelastis robinsoni Gibeaux, 1994
- Exelastis viettei (Gibeaux, 1994)
- Megalorhipida leucodactylus (Fabricius, 1794)
- Megalorhipida prolai Gibeaux, 1994
- Ochyrotica moheliensis Gibeaux, 1994
- Ochyrotica rufa Arenberger, 1987
- Platyptilia comorensis Gibeaux, 1994
- Stenodacma wahlbergi (Zeller, 1852)
- Stenoptilodes taprobanes (Felder & Rogenhofer, 1875)
- Titanoptilus laniger Bigot, 1969
- Walsinghamiella prolai (Gibeaux, 1994)

== Pyralidae ==
- Canthelea oegnusalis (Walker, 1859)
- Endotricha vinolentalis Ragonot, 1891
- Epicrocis oegnusalis (Walker, 1859)
- Etiella zinckenella (Treitschke, 1832)
- Goateria mayottensis Leraut, 2010
- Macalla seyrigalis Marion & Viette, 1956
- Maliarpha separatella (Ragonot, 1888)
- Marionana paulianalis Viette, 1953
- Nhoabe privatalis Viette, 1960
- Sindris sganzini Boisduval, 1833

== Saturniidae ==
- Antherina suraka (Boisduval, 1833)

== Sphingidae ==
- Acherontia atropos (Linnaeus, 1758)
- Agrius convolvuli (Linnaeus, 1758)
- Basiothia medea (Fabricius, 1781)
- Batocnema coquerelii (Boisduval, 1875)
- Cephonodes hylas (Linnaeus, 1771)
- Coelonia fulvinotata (Butler, 1875)
- Coelonia solani (Boisduval, 1833)
- Daphnis nerii (Linnaeus, 1758)
- Dargeclanis grandidieri (Mabille, 1879)
- Euchloron megaera (Linnaeus, 1758)
- Hippotion celerio (Linnaeus, 1758)
- Hippotion eson (Cramer, 1779)
- Hippotion geryon (Boisduval, 1875)
- Maassenia heydeni (Saalmüller, 1878)
- Macroglossum aesalon Mabille, 1879
- Macroglossum trochilus (Hübner, 1823)
- Nephele accentifera (Palisot de Beauvois, 1821)
- Nephele comoroana Clark, 1923
- Nephele densoi (Keferstein, 1870)
- Nephele oenopion (Hübner, [1824])
- Pseudoclanis grandidieri (Mabille, 1879)
- Temnora fumosa (Walker, 1856)
- Temnora leighi Rothschild & Jordan, 1915
- Temnora marginata (Walker, 1856)
- Temnora peckoveri (Butler, 1876)
- Temnora pseudopylas (Rothschild, 1894)
- Theretra orpheus (Herrich-Schäffer, 1854)
- Xanthopan morganii (Walker, 1856)

== Thyrididae ==
- Hapana carcealis Whalley, 1971
- Rhodoneura opalinula (Mabille, 1879)
- Rhodoneura sordidula (Plötz, 1880)
- Rhodoneura zophocrana Viette, 1957

== Tineidae ==
- Cimitra fetialis (Meyrick, 1917)
- Cimitra horridella (Walker, 1863)
- Dasyses rugosella (Stainton, 1859)
- Scalidomia fetialis (Meyrick, 1917)
- Silosca comorensis Gozmány, 1968
- Tiquadra goochii Walsingham, 1881

== Tortricidae ==
- Bactra sinassula Diakonoff, 1963
- Bactra stagnicolana Zeller, 1852
- Brachiolia amblopis (Meyrick, 1911)
- Brachiolia egenella (Walker, 1864)
- Coniostola stereoma (Meyrick, 1912)
- Cosmorrhyncha ocellata (Mabille, 1900)
- Cryptaspasma zigzag Diakonoff, 1983
- Cryptophlebia aphos Diakonoff, 1983
- Cryptophlebia hemon Diakonoff, 1983
- Eccopsis encardia Diakonoff, 1983
- Eccopsis heterodon Diakonoff, 1981
- Eccopsis wahlbergiana Zeller, 1852
- Hopliteccopsis maura Diakonoff, 1983
- Megaherpystis agmatophora Diakonoff, 1989
- Megalomacha tigripes Diakonoff, 1960
- Procrica agrapha Diakonoff, 1983
- Procrica diarda Diakonoff, 1983
- Procrica intrepida (Meyrick, 1912)
- Procrica sanidota (Meyrick, 1912)
- Thylacandra endotera Diakonoff, 1983
- Thylacandra melanotoma Diakonoff, 1983

== Uraniidae ==
- Dirades comoroana Boudinot, 1982
- Dirades theclata (Guenée, 1858)
- Epiplema fletcheri Boudinot, 1982
- Epiplema illineata Warren, 1899
- Epiplema viettei Boudinot, 1982

== Xyloryctidae ==
- Eretmocera laetissima Zeller, 1852
