= Scopula rhodocraspeda =

Scientific classification
- Domain: Eukaryota
- Kingdom: Animalia
- Phylum: Arthropoda
- Class: Insecta
- Order: Lepidoptera
- Family: Geometridae
- Genus: Scopula
- Species: S. rhodocraspeda

Binomial name
- Scopula rhodocraspeda Prout, 1932

Species of geometer moth in subfamily Sterrhinae

Scopula rhodocraspeda is a moth of the family Geometridae. It is found in Madagascar.

This species is mustard-yellow to apricot-yellow with the costal edge of the forewing rosy, also the fringes. Possibly this is a colour-form of Scopula bistrigata (Pagenstecher).
