= Coptobasoides =

Scientific classification
- Domain: Eukaryota
- Kingdom: Animalia
- Phylum: Arthropoda
- Class: Insecta
- Order: Lepidoptera
- Family: Crambidae
- Subfamily: Pyraustinae
- Genus: Coptobasoides; Janse, 1935

Type species
- Coptobasoides leopoldi Janse, 1935

Genus of moths

Coptobasoides is a genus of moths of the family Crambidae.

== Species ==
- Coptobasoides comoralis Viette, 1960
- Coptobasoides djadjoualis Viette, 1981
- Coptobasoides latericalis Marion, 1955
- Coptobasoides leopoldi Janse, 1935
- Coptobasoides marionalis Viette, 1960
- Coptobasoides ochristalis Marion, 1956
- Coptobasoides pauliani Marion, 1955

== Former species ==
- Coptobasoides leucothyralis (Mabille, 1900)
- Coptobasoides rubralis (Hampson, 1898)
- Coptobasoides rubrifucalis (Mabille, 1900)
