= Exilisia punctata =

Scientific classification
- Kingdom: Animalia
- Phylum: Arthropoda
- Class: Insecta
- Order: Lepidoptera
- Superfamily: Noctuoidea
- Family: Erebidae
- Subfamily: Arctiinae
- Genus: Exilisia
- Species: E. punctata

Binomial name
- Exilisia punctata (Hampson, 1900)

Synonyms
- Philenora punctata Hampson, 1900

Species of moth

Exilisia punctata is a moth of the subfamily Arctiinae. It was described by George Hampson in 1900. It is found in Madagascar.
