= Dipleurinodes =

Scientific classification
- Kingdom: Animalia
- Phylum: Arthropoda
- Class: Insecta
- Order: Lepidoptera
- Family: Crambidae
- Subfamily: Scopariinae
- Genus: Dipleurinodes; Leraut, 1989

Genus of moths

Dipleurinodes is a genus of moths of the family Crambidae.

== Species ==
- Dipleurinodes bueaensis (Maes, 1996)
- Dipleurinodes comorensis Leraut, 1989
- Dipleurinodes mineti Leraut, 1989
- Dipleurinodes nigra Leraut, 1989
- Dipleurinodes phaeopalpia (Hampson, 1917)
- Dipleurinodes tavetae Maes, 2004
