= Fodinoidea =

Scientific classification
- Kingdom: Animalia
- Phylum: Arthropoda
- Clade: Pancrustacea
- Class: Insecta
- Order: Lepidoptera
- Superfamily: Noctuoidea
- Family: Erebidae
- Subfamily: Arctiinae
- Subtribe: Spilosomina
- Genus: Fodinoidea; Saalmüller, 1884

Type species
- Fodinoidea staudingeri Saalmüller, 1884

Genus of moths

Fodinoidea is a genus of tiger moths in the family Erebidae. The genus was described by Saalmüller in 1884 and it is strictly endemic to Madagascar.

== Species and subspecies ==
- Fodinoidea formosa Toulgoët, 1984
- Fodinoidea pluto Toulgoët, 1961
  - Fodinoidea pluto celsicola Toulgoët, 1984
- Fodinoidea pulchra Toulgoët, 1971
- Fodinoidea pupieri Toulgoët, 1972
- Fodinoidea rectifascia Collenette, 1930
- Fodinoidea staudingeri Saalmüller, 1884
  - Fodinoidea staudingeri laeta Toulgoët, 1957
- Fodinoidea vectigera (Mabille, 1882)
  - Fodinoidea vectigera sanguinea Toulgoët, 1984
