= Exilisia mnigrum =

Scientific classification
- Domain: Eukaryota
- Kingdom: Animalia
- Phylum: Arthropoda
- Class: Insecta
- Order: Lepidoptera
- Superfamily: Noctuoidea
- Family: Erebidae
- Subfamily: Arctiinae
- Genus: Exilisia
- Species: E. mnigrum

Binomial name
- Exilisia mnigrum (Mabille, 1899)

Synonyms
- Nudaria m-nigrum Mabille, 1899; Nudaria mnigrum; Exilisia m-nigrum

Species of moth

Exilisia mnigrum is a moth of the subfamily Arctiinae. It was described by Paul Mabille in 1899. It is found on Madagascar.
