= Exilisia bijuga =

Scientific classification
- Domain: Eukaryota
- Kingdom: Animalia
- Phylum: Arthropoda
- Class: Insecta
- Order: Lepidoptera
- Superfamily: Noctuoidea
- Family: Erebidae
- Subfamily: Arctiinae
- Genus: Exilisia
- Species: E. bijuga

Binomial name
- Exilisia bijuga (Mabille, 1899)

Synonyms
- Lithosia bijuga Mabille, 1899; Philenora bijuga diegoi Toulgoët, 1956

Species of moth

Exilisia bijuga is a moth of the subfamily Arctiinae. It was described by Paul Mabille in 1899. It is found on Madagascar.

== Subspecies ==
- Exilisia bijuga bijuga
- Exilisia bijuga diegoi (Toulgoët, 1956)
