= Exilisia falcata =

Scientific classification
- Kingdom: Animalia
- Phylum: Arthropoda
- Class: Insecta
- Order: Lepidoptera
- Superfamily: Noctuoidea
- Family: Erebidae
- Subfamily: Arctiinae
- Genus: Exilisia
- Species: E. falcata

Binomial name
- Exilisia falcata (Toulgoët, 1954)

Synonyms
- Philenora falcata Toulgoët, 1954

Species of moth

Exilisia falcata is a moth of the subfamily Arctiinae. It was described by Hervé de Toulgoët in 1954. It is found on Madagascar.
