= Coptobasoides leopoldi =

Scientific classification
- Domain: Eukaryota
- Kingdom: Animalia
- Phylum: Arthropoda
- Class: Insecta
- Order: Lepidoptera
- Family: Crambidae
- Genus: Coptobasoides
- Species: C. leopoldi

Binomial name
- Coptobasoides leopoldi Janse, 1935

Species of moth

Coptobasoides leopoldi is a moth in the family Crambidae. It was described by Anthonie Johannes Theodorus Janse in 1935. It is found on Sulawesi in Indonesia.
