= Psilocerea melanops =

Scientific classification
- Domain: Eukaryota
- Kingdom: Animalia
- Phylum: Arthropoda
- Class: Insecta
- Order: Lepidoptera
- Family: Geometridae
- Genus: Psilocerea
- Species: P. melanops

Binomial name
- Psilocerea melanops Carcasson,1965

Species of moth

Psilocerea melanops is a species of moth of the family Geometridae. It is found in Uganda.

This species has length of the forewings of 17–19 mm, a chamois ground colour, irrorated with darker scales and speckled with some black scales.

Carcasson suggested that this species may be wrongly placed in this genus as it differs from other species in the straight margin of the forewings.
