= Psilocerea tigrinata =

Scientific classification
- Kingdom: Animalia
- Phylum: Arthropoda
- Clade: Pancrustacea
- Class: Insecta
- Order: Lepidoptera
- Family: Geometridae
- Genus: Psilocerea
- Species: P. tigrinata

Binomial name
- Psilocerea tigrinata Saalmüller, 1880

Species of moth

Psilocerea tigrinata is a species of moth of the family Geometridae first described by Max Saalmüller in 1880. It is found in Madagascar.

It is leather brown with a wingspan of 42 mm.
