= Euphyciodes griveaudalis =

Scientific classification
- Kingdom: Animalia
- Phylum: Arthropoda
- Class: Insecta
- Order: Lepidoptera
- Family: Crambidae
- Genus: Euphyciodes
- Species: E. griveaudalis

Binomial name
- Euphyciodes griveaudalis Viette, 1960

Species of moth

Euphyciodes griveaudalis is a moth in the family Crambidae. It was described by Viette in 1960. It is found in Madagascar.
