= Fodinoidea staudingeri =

Scientific classification
- Kingdom: Animalia
- Phylum: Arthropoda
- Clade: Pancrustacea
- Class: Insecta
- Order: Lepidoptera
- Superfamily: Noctuoidea
- Family: Erebidae
- Subfamily: Arctiinae
- Genus: Fodinoidea
- Species: F. staudingeri

Binomial name
- Fodinoidea staudingeri Saalmüller, 1884

Species of moth

Fodinoidea staudingeri is a moth of the family Erebidae. It was described by Max Saalmüller in 1884. It is found on Madagascar.

== Subspecies ==
- Fodinoidea staudingeri staudingeri
- Fodinoidea staudingeri laeta Toulgoët, 1957
