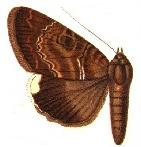

Scientific classification
- Kingdom: Animalia
- Phylum: Arthropoda
- Class: Insecta
- Order: Lepidoptera
- Superfamily: Noctuoidea
- Family: Erebidae
- Genus: Tolna
- Species: T. chionopera

Binomial name
- Tolna chionopera (Druce, 1912)

Synonyms
- Ercheia chionopera Druce, 1912; Tolna chionopera media Berio

= Tolna chionopera =

Species of moth

Tolna chionopera is a species of moth of the family Noctuidae. It is found in Africa, including Cameroon.
