= Dipleurinodes mineti =

Scientific classification
- Kingdom: Animalia
- Phylum: Arthropoda
- Class: Insecta
- Order: Lepidoptera
- Family: Crambidae
- Genus: Dipleurinodes
- Species: D. mineti

Binomial name
- Dipleurinodes mineti Leraut, 1989

Species of moth

Dipleurinodes mineti is a moth in the family Crambidae. It was described by Patrice J.A. Leraut in 1989. It is found in Madagascar.
