= Exilisia gablerinus =

Scientific classification
- Domain: Eukaryota
- Kingdom: Animalia
- Phylum: Arthropoda
- Class: Insecta
- Order: Lepidoptera
- Superfamily: Noctuoidea
- Family: Erebidae
- Subfamily: Arctiinae
- Genus: Exilisia
- Species: E. gablerinus

Binomial name
- Exilisia gablerinus Kühne, 2008

Species of moth

Exilisia gablerinus is a moth of the subfamily Arctiinae. It was described by Lars Kühne in 2008. It is found in Kenya.
