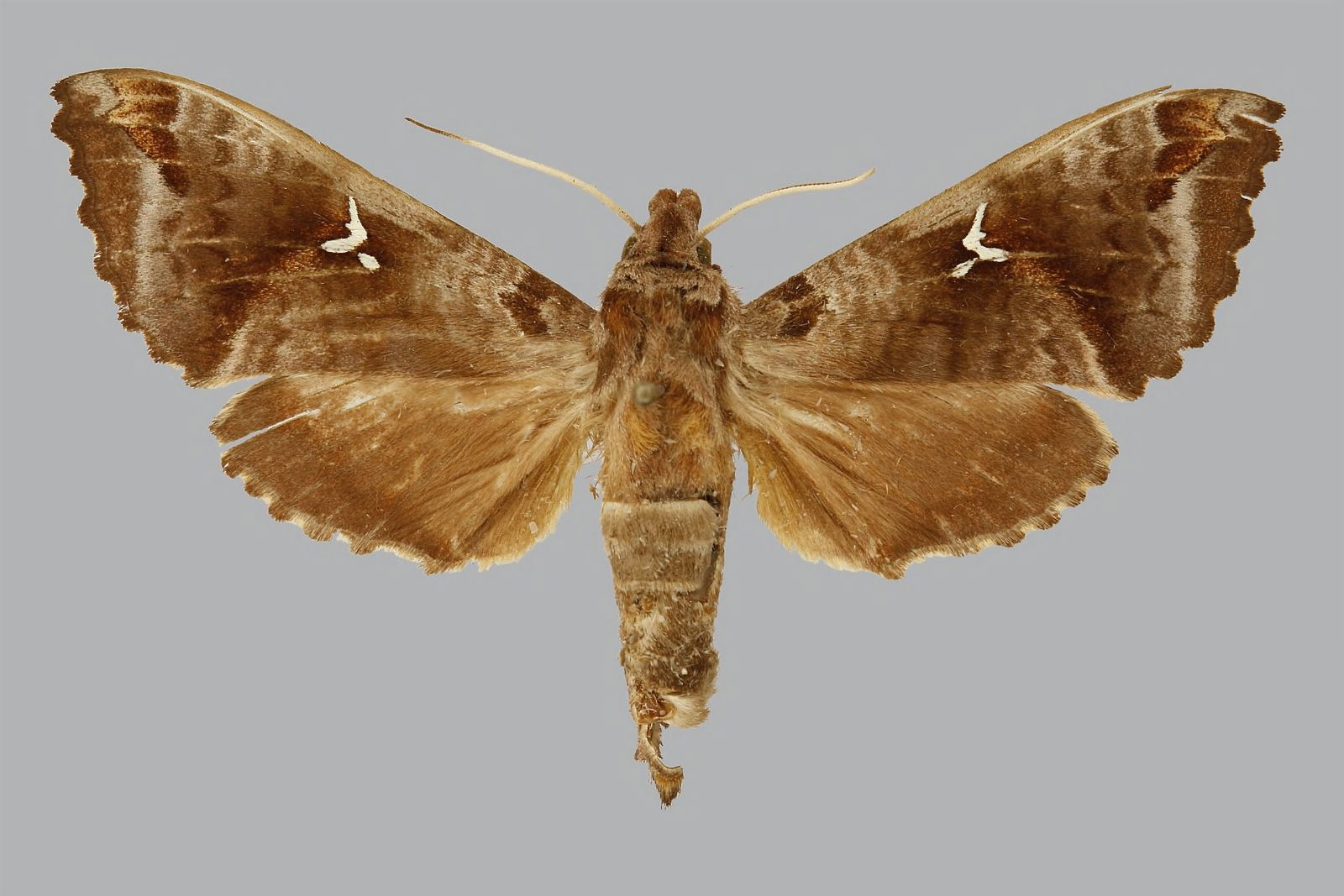
- Maassenia distincta

Scientific classification
- Kingdom: Animalia
- Phylum: Arthropoda
- Class: Insecta
- Order: Lepidoptera
- Family: Sphingidae
- Subtribe: Macroglossina
- Genus: Maassenia; Saalmüller, 1884

Species
- See text

= Maassenia =

Genus of moths

Maassenia is a genus of moths in the family Sphingidae.

== Species ==
- Maassenia distincta Gehlen, 1934
- Maassenia heydeni (Saalmüller, 1884)
