= Fodinoidea vectigera =

Scientific classification
- Domain: Eukaryota
- Kingdom: Animalia
- Phylum: Arthropoda
- Class: Insecta
- Order: Lepidoptera
- Superfamily: Noctuoidea
- Family: Erebidae
- Subfamily: Arctiinae
- Genus: Fodinoidea
- Species: F. vectigera

Binomial name
- Fodinoidea vectigera (Mabille, 1882)

Synonyms
- Eusemia vectigera Mabille, 1882; Fodinoidea maculata Butler, 1885

Species of moth

Fodinoidea vectigera is a moth of the family Erebidae. It was described by Paul Mabille in 1882. It is found on Madagascar.
