= Psilocerea dysonaria =

Scientific classification
- Domain: Eukaryota
- Kingdom: Animalia
- Phylum: Arthropoda
- Class: Insecta
- Order: Lepidoptera
- Family: Geometridae
- Genus: Psilocerea
- Species: P. dysonaria

Binomial name
- Psilocerea dysonaria C. Swinhoe, 1904

Synonyms
- Psilocera dysonaria

Species of moth

Psilocerea dysonaria is a species of moth of the family Geometridae first described by Charles Swinhoe in 1904. It is found on Madagascar.

Its wingspan is 43.2 mm.

The original description by Swinhoe from 1904 is:

Pale uniform grey with a pinkish tinge irrorated with chestnut-brown atoms; the markings also chestnut-brown; a double straight band from apex of fore-wings, where there is a dark suffused space, to the middle of the abdominal margin of hind-wings, the interior space of the double band is whitish and there is a whitish edging on the outer side of it; on the outer margin of both wings there is some red-brown suffusion; under-side as above but paler.

Expanse of wings 1.7/10 inches.

Hab. Madagascar (Cowan).
