= Archidrepana =

Scientific classification
- Kingdom: Animalia
- Phylum: Arthropoda
- Clade: Pancrustacea
- Class: Insecta
- Order: Lepidoptera
- Family: Drepanidae
- Subfamily: Drepaninae
- Genus: Archidrepana; Warren, 1902
- Species: A. saturniata

Binomial name
- Archidrepana saturniata Warren, 1902

Monotypic moth genus in family Drepanidae

Archidrepana is a monotypic moth genus belonging to the subfamily Drepaninae. This genus was erected by William Warren in 1902. Its only species, Archidrepana saturniata, described by the same author in the same year, is known from the Comoros (Grande Comore) and from Madagascar.

This species has a wingspan of 52 mm.

== See also ==
- List of moths of the Comoros
- List of moths of Madagascar
