= Fodinoidea pulchra =

Scientific classification
- Kingdom: Animalia
- Phylum: Arthropoda
- Class: Insecta
- Order: Lepidoptera
- Superfamily: Noctuoidea
- Family: Erebidae
- Subfamily: Arctiinae
- Genus: Fodinoidea
- Species: F. pulchra

Binomial name
- Fodinoidea pulchra Toulgoët, 1971

Species of moth

Fodinoidea pulchra is a moth of the family Erebidae. It was described by Hervé de Toulgoët in 1971. It is found on Madagascar.
