= Psilocerea arabica =

Scientific classification
- Kingdom: Animalia
- Phylum: Arthropoda
- Class: Insecta
- Order: Lepidoptera
- Family: Geometridae
- Genus: Psilocerea
- Species: P. arabica

Binomial name
- Psilocerea arabica Wiltshire, 1983

Species of moth

Psilocerea arabica is a species of moth of the family Geometridae. It is found in Saudi Arabia, Yemen and Ethiopia.
