= Dipleurinodes phaeopalpia =

Scientific classification
- Kingdom: Animalia
- Phylum: Arthropoda
- Class: Insecta
- Order: Lepidoptera
- Family: Crambidae
- Genus: Dipleurinodes
- Species: D. phaeopalpia

Binomial name
- Dipleurinodes phaeopalpia (Hampson, 1917)

Synonyms
- Scoparia phaeopalpia Hampson, 1917

Species of moth

Dipleurinodes phaeopalpia is a moth in the family Crambidae. It was described by George Hampson in 1917. It is found in South Africa.
