= Exilisia =

Scientific classification
- Kingdom: Animalia
- Phylum: Arthropoda
- Class: Insecta
- Order: Lepidoptera
- Superfamily: Noctuoidea
- Family: Erebidae
- Subfamily: Arctiinae
- Genus: Exilisia; Toulgoët, 1958

Type species
- Philenora punctata Hampson, 1900

Genus of moths

Exilisia is a genus of moths in the family Erebidae. The genus was erected by Hervé de Toulgoët in 1958.

== Species ==
- Exilisia andriai Toulgoët, 1955
- Exilisia bijuga Mabille, 1899
- Exilisia bilineata Toulgoët, 1954
- Exilisia bipuncta Hampson, 1900
- Exilisia butleri Toulgoët, 1958
- Exilisia contrasta Kühne, 2007
- Exilisia costimacula Toulgoët, 1958
- Exilisia disticha (Hampson, 1914)
- Exilisia falcata Toulgoët, 1954
- Exilisia flavicapilla Toulgoët, 1954
- Exilisia flavicincta Toulgoët, 1965
- Exilisia fletcheri Toulgoët, 1956
- Exilisia friederikeae Kühne, 2007
- Exilisia gablerinus Kühne, 2008
- Exilisia insularis Toulgoët, 1972
- Exilisia kruegeri Kühne, 2007
- Exilisia leighi Toulgoët, 1956
- Exilisia lichenaria Toulgoët, 1954
- Exilisia mabillei Toulgoët, 1958
- Exilisia marmorea Butler, 1882
- Exilisia mnigrum Mabille, 1899
- Exilisia nebulosa Toulgoët, 1958
- Exilisia obliterata Toulgoët, 1958
- Exilisia ocularis Toulgoët, 1953
- Exilisia olivascens Toulgoët, 1954
- Exilisia parvula Butler, 1882
- Exilisia perlucida Toulgoët, 1954
- Exilisia placida Butler, 1882
- Exilisia pluripunctata Mabille, 1900
- Exilisia prominentia Kühne, 2007
- Exilisia pseudomarmorea Toulgoët, 1958
- Exilisia pseudoplacida Toulgoët, 1958
- Exilisia punctata Hampson, 1900
- Exilisia quadripunctata Toulgoët, 1956
- Exilisia rufescens Toulgoët, 1958
- Exilisia subfusca Freyer, 1912
- Exilisia tripuncta (Kiriakoff, 1958)
- Exilisia variegata Toulgoët, 1972
- Exilisia viettei Toulgoët, 1958
