= Exilisia prominentia =

Scientific classification
- Domain: Eukaryota
- Kingdom: Animalia
- Phylum: Arthropoda
- Class: Insecta
- Order: Lepidoptera
- Superfamily: Noctuoidea
- Family: Erebidae
- Subfamily: Arctiinae
- Genus: Exilisia
- Species: E. prominentia

Binomial name
- Exilisia prominentia Kühne, 2007

Species of moth

Exilisia prominentia is a moth of the subfamily Arctiinae. It was described by Lars Kühne in 2007. It is found in Kenya.
