= Fodinoidea pluto =

Scientific classification
- Kingdom: Animalia
- Phylum: Arthropoda
- Class: Insecta
- Order: Lepidoptera
- Superfamily: Noctuoidea
- Family: Erebidae
- Subfamily: Arctiinae
- Genus: Fodinoidea
- Species: F. pluto

Binomial name
- Fodinoidea pluto Toulgoët, 1961

Species of moth

Fodinoidea pluto is a moth of the family Erebidae. It was described by Hervé de Toulgoët in 1961. It is found on Madagascar.

== Subspecies ==
- Fodinoidea pluto pluto
- Fodinoidea pluto celsicola Toulgoët, 1984
