= Psilocerea anearia =

Scientific classification
- Kingdom: Animalia
- Phylum: Arthropoda
- Clade: Pancrustacea
- Class: Insecta
- Order: Lepidoptera
- Family: Geometridae
- Genus: Psilocerea
- Species: P. anearia

Binomial name
- Psilocerea anearia C. Swinhoe, 1904

Species of moth

Psilocerea anearia is a species of moth of the family Geometridae first described by Charles Swinhoe in 1904. It is found on Madagascar.

Its wingspan is 43.2 mm.

The original description by Swinhoe from 1904 is:

Psilocerea anearia, nov.

(male). Pale brown with an ochreous tinge; plumes of antennae brown, shaft ochreous with brown spots; frons and head ochreous, body and wings uniformly coloured, sparsely irrorated with blackishbrown atoms; a black dot at the end of each cell; indications of a black interior line on fore-wings outwardly curved, most distinct below the costa; a pale grey line, outwardly edged with whitish, quite straight but very indistinct, picked out with white specks with black points, running from the apex, near which is a black spot on the costa, to the middle of the hinder margin; hind-wings with a medial thin band, blackish and not very distinct, with some blackish marks below it and two black spots close together in the disc below the middle; under-side pinkish-white with the markings plainly shown and mostly black.

Expanse of wings 1.7/10 inches.

Hab. Madagascar (Cowan).
