= Psilocerea wintreberti =

Scientific classification
- Domain: Eukaryota
- Kingdom: Animalia
- Phylum: Arthropoda
- Class: Insecta
- Order: Lepidoptera
- Family: Geometridae
- Genus: Psilocerea
- Species: P. wintreberti

Binomial name
- Psilocerea wintreberti Herbulot, 1970

Species of moth

Psilocerea wintreberti is a species of moth of the family Geometridae first described by Claude Herbulot in 1970. It is found in northern Madagascar.

The length of its forewings is 20 mm.
