= Viettesia griseovariegata =

Scientific classification
- Domain: Eukaryota
- Kingdom: Animalia
- Phylum: Arthropoda
- Class: Insecta
- Order: Lepidoptera
- Superfamily: Noctuoidea
- Family: Erebidae
- Subfamily: Arctiinae
- Genus: Viettesia
- Species: V. griseovariegata

Binomial name
- Viettesia griseovariegata (Toulgoët, 1954)

Synonyms
- Nolosia griseovariegata Toulgoët, 1954

Species of moth

Viettesia griseovariegata is a moth in the subfamily Arctiinae. It was described by Hervé de Toulgoët in 1954. It is found on Madagascar.
