= Psilocerea psegma =

Scientific classification
- Domain: Eukaryota
- Kingdom: Animalia
- Phylum: Arthropoda
- Class: Insecta
- Order: Lepidoptera
- Family: Geometridae
- Genus: Psilocerea
- Species: P. psegma

Binomial name
- Psilocerea psegma Herbulot, 1981

Synonyms
- Eupsamma solitaria Herbulot, 1992; Psilocerea solitaria (Herbulot, 1992)

Species of moth

Psilocerea psegma is a species of moth of the family Geometridae. It is found on the Comoros.

== Related pages ==
- List of moths of the Comoros
