= Exilisia parvula =

Scientific classification
- Domain: Eukaryota
- Kingdom: Animalia
- Phylum: Arthropoda
- Class: Insecta
- Order: Lepidoptera
- Superfamily: Noctuoidea
- Family: Erebidae
- Subfamily: Arctiinae
- Genus: Exilisia
- Species: E. parvula

Binomial name
- Exilisia parvula (Butler, 1882)

Synonyms
- Lysceia parvula Butler, 1882

Species of moth

Exilisia parvula is a moth of the subfamily Arctiinae. It was described by Arthur Gardiner Butler in 1882. It is found on Madagascar.
