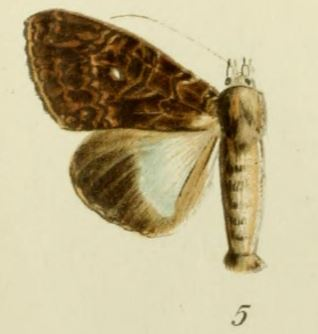

Scientific classification
- Domain: Eukaryota
- Kingdom: Animalia
- Phylum: Arthropoda
- Class: Insecta
- Order: Lepidoptera
- Superfamily: Noctuoidea
- Family: Erebidae
- Genus: Tolna
- Species: T. niveipicta

Binomial name
- Tolna niveipicta Strand, 1915

= Tolna niveipicta =

Species of moth

Tolna niveipicta is a species of moth of the family Erebidae first described by Embrik Strand in 1915.

It is found in Cameroon and the Democratic Republic of the Congo.

This species has a wingspan of 48 mm and a body length of 21 mm.
