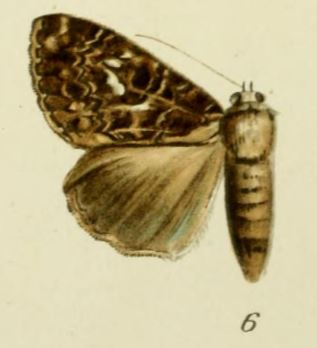

Scientific classification
- Kingdom: Animalia
- Phylum: Arthropoda
- Class: Insecta
- Order: Lepidoptera
- Superfamily: Noctuoidea
- Family: Erebidae
- Genus: Tolna
- Species: T. tetrhemicycla

Binomial name
- Tolna tetrhemicycla Strand 1913

= Tolna tetrhemicycla =

Species of moth

Tolna tetrhemicycla is a species of moth of the family Erebidae.

It is found in Cameroon.
