= Exilisia flavicapilla =

Scientific classification
- Kingdom: Animalia
- Phylum: Arthropoda
- Class: Insecta
- Order: Lepidoptera
- Superfamily: Noctuoidea
- Family: Erebidae
- Subfamily: Arctiinae
- Genus: Exilisia
- Species: E. flavicapilla

Binomial name
- Exilisia flavicapilla (Toulgoët, 1954)

Synonyms
- Philenora flavicapilla Toulgoët, 1954

Species of moth

Exilisia flavicapilla is a moth of the subfamily Arctiinae. It was described by Hervé de Toulgoët in 1954. It is found on Madagascar.
