= Viettesia proxima =

Scientific classification
- Domain: Eukaryota
- Kingdom: Animalia
- Phylum: Arthropoda
- Class: Insecta
- Order: Lepidoptera
- Superfamily: Noctuoidea
- Family: Erebidae
- Subfamily: Arctiinae
- Genus: Viettesia
- Species: V. proxima

Binomial name
- Viettesia proxima Toulgoët, 1959

Species of moth

Viettesia proxima is a moth in the subfamily Arctiinae. It was described by Hervé de Toulgoët in 1959. It is found on Madagascar.
