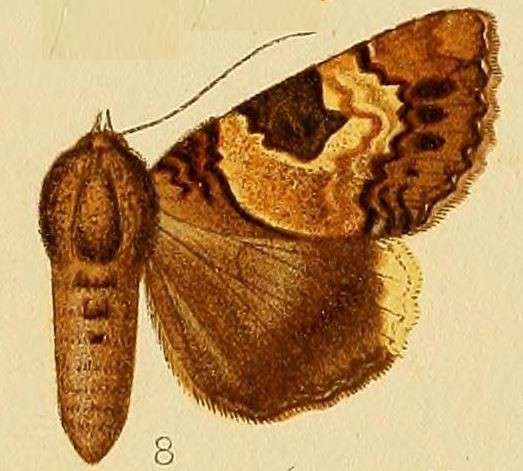

Scientific classification
- Kingdom: Animalia
- Phylum: Arthropoda
- Class: Insecta
- Order: Lepidoptera
- Superfamily: Noctuoidea
- Family: Erebidae
- Genus: Tolna
- Species: T. macrosema

Binomial name
- Tolna macrosema Hampson, 1913

= Tolna macrosema =

Species of moth

Tolna macrosema is a species of moth of the family Erebidae.

== Distribution ==
It is found in Ghana and South Africa
