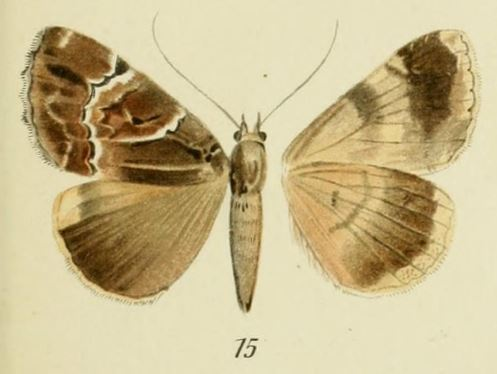

Scientific classification
- Kingdom: Animalia
- Phylum: Arthropoda
- Class: Insecta
- Order: Lepidoptera
- Superfamily: Noctuoidea
- Family: Erebidae
- Genus: Tolna
- Species: T. strandi

Binomial name
- Tolna strandi (Bryk, 1915)

Synonyms
- Achaea strandi Bryk, 1915

= Tolna strandi =

Species of moth

Tolna strandi is a species of moth of the family Erebidae.

It is found in Cameroon.
