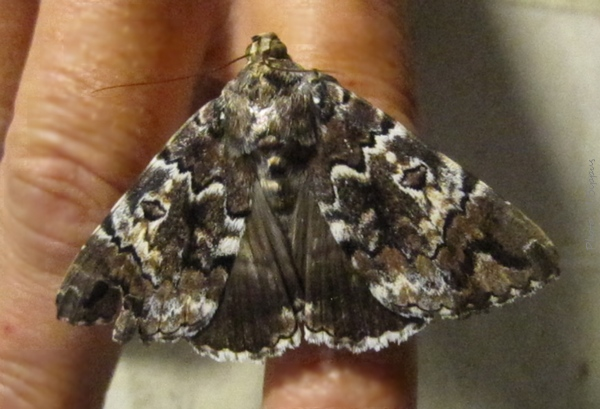

Scientific classification
- Kingdom: Animalia
- Phylum: Arthropoda
- Clade: Pancrustacea
- Class: Insecta
- Order: Lepidoptera
- Superfamily: Noctuoidea
- Family: Erebidae
- Subfamily: Erebinae
- Genus: Tolna; Walker, 1869

Synonyms
- Epistona Möschler, 1884

= Tolna (moth) =

Genus of moths

Tolna is a genus of moths of the family Erebidae. The genus was erected by Francis Walker in 1869.

== Species ==
- Tolna alboapicata Berio, 1956
- Tolna atrigona A. E. Prout, 1927
- Tolna burdoni Carcasson, 1965
- Tolna chionopera (H. Druce, 1912)
- Tolna complicata (Butler, 1880)
- Tolna cryptoleuca Hampson, 1918
- Tolna demaculata Strand, 1913
- Tolna hypogrammica Hampson, 1918
- Tolna limula (Möschler, 1883)
- Tolna macrosema Hampson, 1913
- Tolna niveipicta Strand, 1915
- Tolna sinifera Hampson, 1913
- Tolna strandi (Bryk, 1915)
- Tolna sypnoides (Butler, 1878)
- Tolna tetrhemicycla Strand, 1913
- Tolna variegata (Hampson, 1905)
- Tolna versicolor Walker, 1869
