= Euphyciodes =

Scientific classification
- Domain: Eukaryota
- Kingdom: Animalia
- Phylum: Arthropoda
- Class: Insecta
- Order: Lepidoptera
- Family: Crambidae
- Subfamily: Pyraustinae
- Genus: Euphyciodes; Marion, 1954

Genus of moths

Euphyciodes is a genus of moths of the family Crambidae.

== Species ==
- Euphyciodes albotessulalis (Mabille, 1900)
- Euphyciodes griveaudalis Viette, 1960
