= Psilocerea vestitaria =

Scientific classification
- Domain: Eukaryota
- Kingdom: Animalia
- Phylum: Arthropoda
- Class: Insecta
- Order: Lepidoptera
- Family: Geometridae
- Genus: Psilocerea
- Species: P. vestitaria

Binomial name
- Psilocerea vestitaria C. Swinhoe, 1904

Synonyms
- Psilocera vestitaria

Species of moth

Psilocerea vestitaria is a species of moth of the family Geometridae first described by Charles Swinhoe in 1904. It is found on Madagascar.

Its wingspan is 48.3 mm.

The original description by Swinhoe from 1904 is:

Psilocerea vestitaria, nov.

(Fem). Grey with a slight pinkish tinge, uniform in coloration, irrorated with blackish-brown; a black dot at the end of each cell; a pale ochreous-brown indistinct interior band on the fore-wings, outwardly curved; a straight double line of the same colour from the apex of the fore-wings (where there is some brown suffusion) to the abdominal margin of hind-wings, a little below the middle, and two black spots on the hind-wings below this double line a little below the middle; outer margin of both wings slightly suffused with pale ochreous-brown; under-side slightly paler than the upper-side, well irrorated, the markings almost obsolete.

Expanse of wings 1.9/10 inches.

Hab. Madagascar (Coivan)
