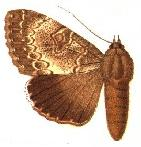

Scientific classification
- Domain: Eukaryota
- Kingdom: Animalia
- Phylum: Arthropoda
- Class: Insecta
- Order: Lepidoptera
- Superfamily: Noctuoidea
- Family: Erebidae
- Genus: Tolna
- Species: T. limula

Binomial name
- Tolna limula (Möschler, 1883)

Synonyms
- Epistona limula Möschler, 1883

= Tolna limula =

Species of moth

Tolna limula is a species of moth of the family Noctuidae first described by Heinrich Benno Möschler in 1883. It is found in Africa, including South Africa.
