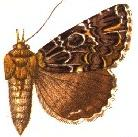

Scientific classification
- Domain: Eukaryota
- Kingdom: Animalia
- Phylum: Arthropoda
- Class: Insecta
- Order: Lepidoptera
- Superfamily: Noctuoidea
- Family: Erebidae
- Genus: Tolna
- Species: T. complicata

Binomial name
- Tolna complicata (Butler, 1880)

Synonyms
- Sypna complicata Butler, 1880

= Tolna complicata =

Species of moth

Tolna complicata is a species of moth of the family Noctuidae first described by Arthur Gardiner Butler in 1880. It is found on Madagascar.
