= Psilocerea =

Scientific classification
- Kingdom: Animalia
- Phylum: Arthropoda
- Clade: Pancrustacea
- Class: Insecta
- Order: Lepidoptera
- Family: Geometridae
- Subfamily: Ennominae
- Genus: Psilocerea; Saalmüller, 1880

Synonyms
- Eupsamma Warren, 1894; Psilocera Warren, 1897

Genus of moths

Psilocerea is a genus of moths in the family Geometridae described by Max Saalmüller in 1880.

Some species of this genus are:

- Psilocerea acerata D. S. Fletcher, 1978
- Psilocerea albivertex Herbulot, 1992
- Psilocerea anearia Swinhoe, 1904
- Psilocerea arabica Wiltshire, 1983
- Psilocerea aspilates Herbulot, 1954
- Psilocerea barychorda Prout, 1932
- Psilocerea carbo Herbulot, 1970
- Psilocerea catenosa Herbulot, 1970
- Psilocerea cneca Prout, 1932
- Psilocerea coronata D. S. Fletcher, 1958
- Psilocerea cuprea Herbulot, 1959
- Psilocerea dysonaria Swinhoe, 1904
- Psilocerea ferruginaria (Mabille, 1898)
- Psilocerea gratiosa Prout, 1927
- Psilocerea griveaudi Herbulot, 1959
- Psilocerea harmonia Prout, 1932
- Psilocerea hypermetra Prout, 1931
- Psilocerea icterias Herbulot, 1973
- Psilocerea immitata Janse, 1932
- Psilocerea insularia (Mabille, 1880)
- Psilocerea jacobi Prout, 1932
- Psilocerea kenricki Prout, 1925
- Psilocerea krooni Krüger, 2007
- Psilocerea laevigata D. S. Fletcher, 1958
- Psilocerea lemur Herbulot, 1954
- Psilocerea leptosyne D. S. Fletcher, 1978
- Psilocerea melanops Carcasson, 1965
- Psilocerea monochroma Herbulot, 1954
- Psilocerea narychorda Prout 1932
- Psilocerea nigromaculata Warren, 1897
- Psilocerea olsoufieffae Prout, 1932
- Psilocerea penicillata Herbulot, 1957
- Psilocerea phrynogyna Herbulot, 1954
- Psilocerea praecoca Herbulot, 1981
- Psilocerea pronisi Viette, 1980
- Psilocerea phrynogyna Herbulot, 1954
- Psilocerea psegma Herbulot, 1981
- Psilocerea pulverosa (Warren, 1894)
- Psilocerea rachicera (Butler, 1880)
- Psilocerea russulata (Mabille, 1898)
- Psilocerea rutila D. S. Fletcher, 1958
- Psilocerea scardamyctes Prout, 1925
- Psilocerea semifacta Prout, 1926
- Psilocerea semirufa (Warren, 1901)
- Psilocerea severa Prout, 1932
- Psilocerea solitaria (Herbulot, 1992)
- Psilocerea swinhoei Herbulot, 1959
- Psilocerea szunyoghi D. S. Fletcher, 1978
- Psilocerea tigrinata Saalmüller, 1880
- Psilocerea toulgoeti Herbulot, 1959
- Psilocerea tristigma Herbulot, 1959
- Psilocerea turpis Warren, 1902
- Psilocerea vestitaria Swinhoe, 1904
- Psilocerea viettei Herbulot, 1954
- Psilocerea virescens Herbulot, 1954
- Psilocerea wintreberti Herbulot, 1970
