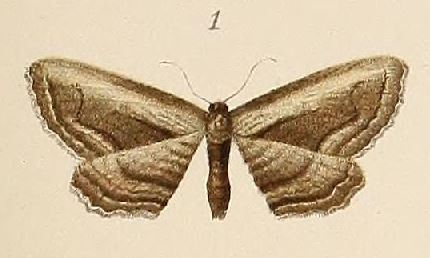

Scientific classification
- Domain: Eukaryota
- Kingdom: Animalia
- Phylum: Arthropoda
- Class: Insecta
- Order: Lepidoptera
- Family: Geometridae
- Genus: Horisme
- Species: H. albostriata

Binomial name
- Horisme albostriata (Pagenstecher, 1907)

Synonyms
- Phibalapteryx albostriata Pagenstecher, 1907

= Horisme albostriata =

Species of moth

Horisme albostriata is a moth of the family Geometridae. The species can be found in the Comoros and the adults have a wingspan of 30 millimetres (1.2 in).

== See also ==
- List of moths of the Comoros
