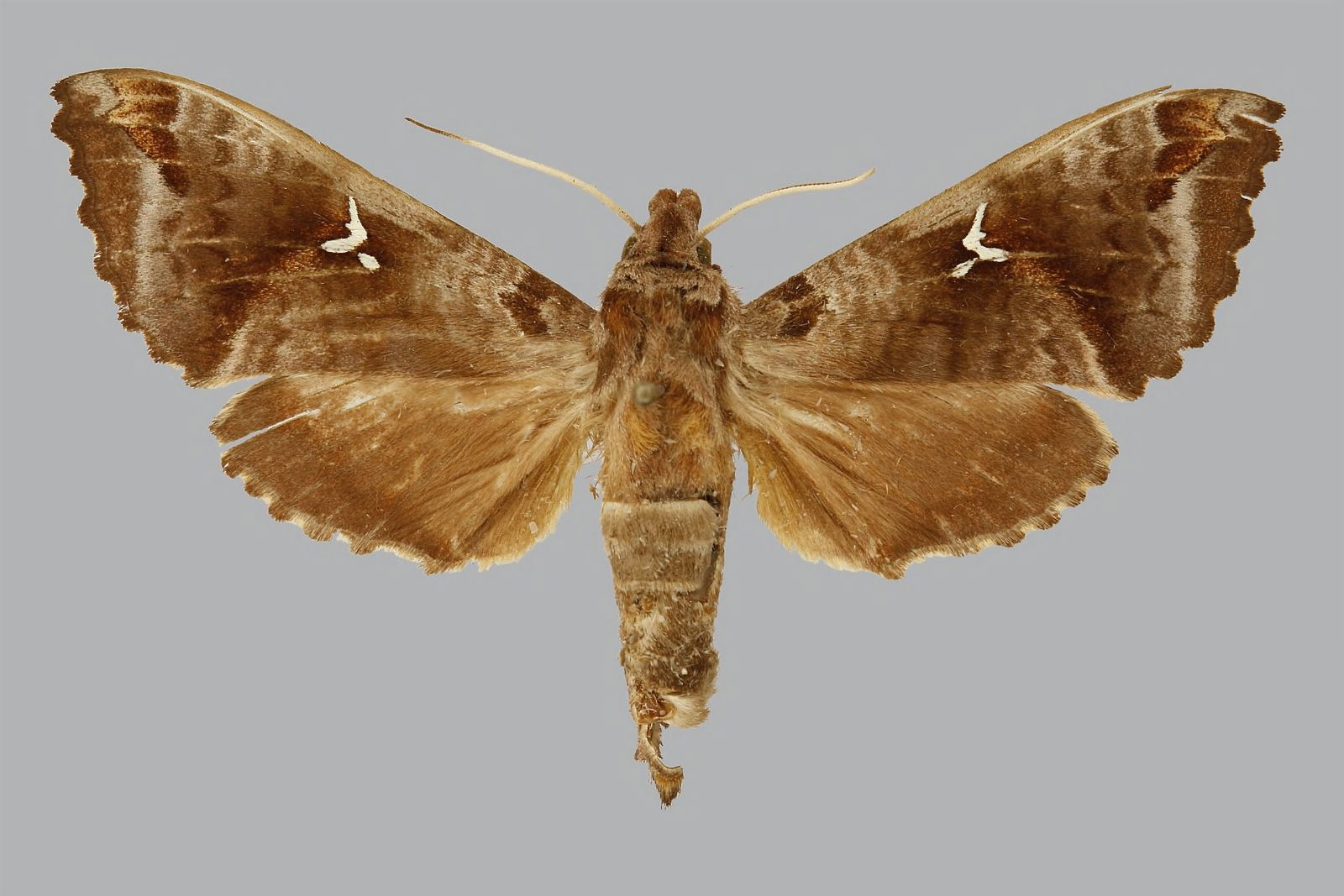

Scientific classification
- Domain: Eukaryota
- Kingdom: Animalia
- Phylum: Arthropoda
- Class: Insecta
- Order: Lepidoptera
- Family: Sphingidae
- Genus: Maassenia
- Species: M. distincta

Binomial name
- Maassenia distincta Gehlen, 1934

= Maassenia distincta =

Species of moth

Maassenia distincta is a moth of the family Sphingidae. It is known from Madagascar.
