= Dipleurinodes bueaensis =

Scientific classification
- Kingdom: Animalia
- Phylum: Arthropoda
- Clade: Pancrustacea
- Class: Insecta
- Order: Lepidoptera
- Family: Crambidae
- Genus: Dipleurinodes
- Species: D. bueaensis

Binomial name
- Dipleurinodes bueaensis (Maes, 1996)

Synonyms
- Eudipleurina bueaensis Maes, 1996

Species of moth

Dipleurinodes bueaensis is a moth of the family Crambidae. It was described by Koen V. N. Maes in 1996. It is found in Cameroon.
