= Viettesia =

Scientific classification
- Kingdom: Animalia
- Phylum: Arthropoda
- Class: Insecta
- Order: Lepidoptera
- Superfamily: Noctuoidea
- Family: Erebidae
- Subfamily: Arctiinae
- Tribe: Lithosiini
- Genus: Viettesia; Toulgoët, 1959

Type species
- Coracia plumicornis (Butler, 1882)

Genus of moths

Viettesia is a genus of moths in the subfamily Arctiinae from Madagascar. The genus was erected by Hervé de Toulgoët in 1959.

== Species ==
- Viettesia aequalis Toulgoët, 1959
- Viettesia bella Toulgoët, 1959
- Viettesia bicolor Toulgoët, 1980
- Viettesia bimaculosa Toulgoët, 1959
- Viettesia brunneomixta Toulgoët, 1959
- Viettesia erastrioides Toulgoët, 1959
- Viettesia griseovariegata (Toulgoët, 1954)
- Viettesia hampsoni Toulgoët, 1959
- Viettesia incerta Toulgoët, 1959
- Viettesia infuscata Toulgoët, 1959
- Viettesia lucida Toulgoët, 1959
- Viettesia luctuosa Toulgoët, 1959
- Viettesia matilei Toulgoët, 1978
- Viettesia modesta Toulgoët, 1959
- Viettesia multistrigata Toulgoët, 1959
- Viettesia ornatrix Toulgoët, 1959
- Viettesia pantherina Toulgoët, 1959
- Viettesia perroti Toulgoët, 1959
- Viettesia plumicornis (Butler, 1882)
- Viettesia proxima Toulgoët, 1959
- Viettesia rufibasis Toulgoët, 1959
- Viettesia transversa Toulgoët, 1959
- Viettesia tristis Toulgoët, 1959
- Viettesia unipuncta Toulgoët, 1959
- Viettesia viettei Toulgoët, 1959
- Viettesia virginalis Toulgoët, 1959

== Former species ==
- Viettesia geminata (Mabille, 1900)
