= Exilisia subfusca =

Scientific classification
- Domain: Eukaryota
- Kingdom: Animalia
- Phylum: Arthropoda
- Class: Insecta
- Order: Lepidoptera
- Superfamily: Noctuoidea
- Family: Erebidae
- Subfamily: Arctiinae
- Genus: Exilisia
- Species: E. subfusca

Binomial name
- Exilisia subfusca (Freyer, 1912)

Synonyms
- Philenora subfusca Freyer, 1912

Species of moth

Exilisia subfusca is a moth of the subfamily Arctiinae. It was described by J. C. F. Freyer in 1912. It is found on the Seychelles in the Indian Ocean.
