= Exilisia disticha =

Scientific classification
- Kingdom: Animalia
- Phylum: Arthropoda
- Class: Insecta
- Order: Lepidoptera
- Superfamily: Noctuoidea
- Family: Erebidae
- Subfamily: Arctiinae
- Genus: Exilisia
- Species: E. disticha

Binomial name
- Exilisia disticha (Hampson, 1914)

Synonyms
- Philenora disticha Hampson, 1914

Species of moth

Exilisia disticha is a moth of the subfamily Arctiinae. It was described by George Hampson in 1914. It is found in Ghana.
