= Exilisia pluripunctata =

Scientific classification
- Domain: Eukaryota
- Kingdom: Animalia
- Phylum: Arthropoda
- Class: Insecta
- Order: Lepidoptera
- Superfamily: Noctuoidea
- Family: Erebidae
- Subfamily: Arctiinae
- Genus: Exilisia
- Species: E. pluripunctata

Binomial name
- Exilisia pluripunctata (Mabille, 1900)

Synonyms
- Eugoa pluripunctata Mabille, 1900

Species of moth

Exilisia pluripunctata is a moth of the subfamily Arctiinae. It was described by Paul Mabille in 1900. It is found on Madagascar.
