= Exilisia ocularis =

Scientific classification
- Kingdom: Animalia
- Phylum: Arthropoda
- Class: Insecta
- Order: Lepidoptera
- Superfamily: Noctuoidea
- Family: Erebidae
- Subfamily: Arctiinae
- Genus: Exilisia
- Species: E. ocularis

Binomial name
- Exilisia ocularis (Toulgoët, 1953)

Synonyms
- Philenora ocularis Toulgoët, 1953

Species of moth

Exilisia ocularis is a moth of the subfamily Arctiinae. It was described by Hervé de Toulgoët in 1953. It is found on Madagascar.
