= Eudipleurina ambrensis =

Scientific classification
- Kingdom: Animalia
- Phylum: Arthropoda
- Class: Insecta
- Order: Lepidoptera
- Family: Crambidae
- Genus: Eudipleurina
- Species: E. ambrensis

Binomial name
- Eudipleurina ambrensis Leraut, 1989

Species of moth

Eudipleurina ambrensis is a moth in the family Crambidae. It was described by Patrice J.A. Leraut in 1989. It is found in Madagascar.
