= Eudipleurina =

Scientific classification
- Kingdom: Animalia
- Phylum: Arthropoda
- Class: Insecta
- Order: Lepidoptera
- Family: Crambidae
- Subfamily: Scopariinae
- Genus: Eudipleurina; Leraut, 1989

Genus of moths

Eudipleurina is a genus of moths of the family Crambidae.

== Species ==
- Eudipleurina ambrensis Leraut, 1989
- Eudipleurina ankaratrella (Marion, 1957)
- Eudipleurina viettei Leraut, 1989
