= Eudipleurina ankaratrella =

Scientific classification
- Kingdom: Animalia
- Phylum: Arthropoda
- Class: Insecta
- Order: Lepidoptera
- Family: Crambidae
- Genus: Eudipleurina
- Species: E. ankaratrella

Binomial name
- Eudipleurina ankaratrella (Marion, 1957)

Synonyms
- Eudoria ankaratrella Marion, 1957

Species of moth

Eudipleurina ankaratrella is a moth in the family Crambidae. It was described by Hubert Marion in 1957. It is found on Madagascar.
