= Viettesia plumicornis =

Scientific classification
- Domain: Eukaryota
- Kingdom: Animalia
- Phylum: Arthropoda
- Class: Insecta
- Order: Lepidoptera
- Superfamily: Noctuoidea
- Family: Erebidae
- Subfamily: Arctiinae
- Genus: Viettesia
- Species: V. plumicornis

Binomial name
- Viettesia plumicornis (Butler, 1882)

Synonyms
- Coracia plumicornis Butler, 1882; Clemensia plumicornis

Species of moth

Viettesia plumicornis is a moth of the subfamily Arctiinae. It was described by Arthur Gardiner Butler in 1882. It is found on Madagascar.
