= Dipleurinodes tavetae =

Scientific classification
- Kingdom: Animalia
- Phylum: Arthropoda
- Class: Insecta
- Order: Lepidoptera
- Family: Crambidae
- Genus: Dipleurinodes
- Species: D. tavetae

Binomial name
- Dipleurinodes tavetae Maes, 2004

Species of moth

Dipleurinodes tavetae is a moth in the family Crambidae. It was described by Koen V. N. Maes in 2004. It is found in Kenya.
