= Exilisia andriai =

Scientific classification
- Kingdom: Animalia
- Phylum: Arthropoda
- Class: Insecta
- Order: Lepidoptera
- Superfamily: Noctuoidea
- Family: Erebidae
- Subfamily: Arctiinae
- Genus: Exilisia
- Species: E. andriai

Binomial name
- Exilisia andriai Toulgoët, 1955

Synonyms
- Philenora andriai Toulgoët, 1955

Species of moth

Exilisia andriai is a moth of the subfamily Arctiinae. It was described by Hervé de Toulgoët in 1955. It is found on Madagascar.
