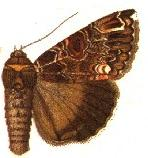

Scientific classification
- Kingdom: Animalia
- Phylum: Arthropoda
- Class: Insecta
- Order: Lepidoptera
- Superfamily: Noctuoidea
- Family: Erebidae
- Genus: Tolna
- Species: T. variegata

Binomial name
- Tolna variegata (Hampson, 1905)

Synonyms
- Homoptera variegata Hampson, 1905

= Tolna variegata =

Species of moth

Tolna variegata is a species of moth of the family Noctuidae first described by George Hampson in 1905. It is found in South Africa.
