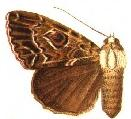

Scientific classification
- Kingdom: Animalia
- Phylum: Arthropoda
- Class: Insecta
- Order: Lepidoptera
- Superfamily: Noctuoidea
- Family: Erebidae
- Genus: Tolna
- Species: T. sinifera

Binomial name
- Tolna sinifera Hampson, 1913

= Tolna sinifera =

Species of moth

Tolna sinifera is a species of moth of the family Noctuidae that was first described by George Hampson in 1913. It is found in Nigeria and South Africa.
