= Paratuerta =

Scientific classification
- Kingdom: Animalia
- Phylum: Arthropoda
- Class: Insecta
- Order: Lepidoptera
- Superfamily: Noctuoidea
- Family: Noctuidae
- Subfamily: Agaristinae
- Genus: Paratuerta; Hampson, 1902

Synonyms
- Ancarista Jordan, 1921

Genus of moths

Paratuerta is a genus of moths of the family Noctuidae. The genus was erected by George Hampson in 1902.

== Species ==
- Paratuerta abrupta Rothschild, 1924
- Paratuerta featheri Fawcett, 1915
- Paratuerta marshalli Hampson, 1902
- Paratuerta undulata Berio, 1970
