= Fodinoidea rectifascia =

Scientific classification
- Domain: Eukaryota
- Kingdom: Animalia
- Phylum: Arthropoda
- Class: Insecta
- Order: Lepidoptera
- Superfamily: Noctuoidea
- Family: Erebidae
- Subfamily: Arctiinae
- Genus: Fodinoidea
- Species: F. rectifascia

Binomial name
- Fodinoidea rectifascia Collenette, 1930

Species of moth

Fodinoidea rectifascia is a moth of the family Erebidae. It was described by Cyril Leslie Collenette in 1930. It is found on Madagascar.
