= Eilema humbloti =

Scientific classification
- Kingdom: Animalia
- Phylum: Arthropoda
- Class: Insecta
- Order: Lepidoptera
- Superfamily: Noctuoidea
- Family: Erebidae
- Subfamily: Arctiinae
- Genus: Eilema
- Species: E. humbloti

Binomial name
- Eilema humbloti Toulgoët, 1956

Species of moth

Eilema humbloti is a moth of the subfamily Arctiinae. It was described by Hervé de Toulgoët in 1956. It is found on the Comoros in the Indian Ocean.
