= Coptobasoides djadjoualis =

Scientific classification
- Kingdom: Animalia
- Phylum: Arthropoda
- Class: Insecta
- Order: Lepidoptera
- Family: Crambidae
- Genus: Coptobasoides
- Species: C. djadjoualis

Binomial name
- Coptobasoides djadjoualis Viette, 1981

Species of moth

Coptobasoides djadjoualis is a moth in the family Crambidae. It was described by Viette in 1981. It is found on the Comoros.
