= Chiromachla pallescens =

Scientific classification
- Domain: Eukaryota
- Kingdom: Animalia
- Phylum: Arthropoda
- Class: Insecta
- Order: Lepidoptera
- Superfamily: Noctuoidea
- Family: Erebidae
- Subfamily: Arctiinae
- Genus: Chiromachla
- Species: C. pallescens

Binomial name
- Chiromachla pallescens (Oberthür, 1890)

Synonyms
- Nyctemera pallescens Oberthür, 1890

Species of moth

Chiromachla pallescens is a moth of the family Erebidae. It is found on the Comoros and Madagascar.
