= Scopula rebaptisa =

Scientific classification
- Kingdom: Animalia
- Phylum: Arthropoda
- Class: Insecta
- Order: Lepidoptera
- Family: Geometridae
- Genus: Scopula
- Species: S. rebaptisa

Binomial name
- Scopula rebaptisa Herbulot, 1985

Synonyms
- Scopula turlini Herbulot, 1985 (preocc. Herbulot, 1978)

Species of geometer moth in subfamily Sterrhinae

Scopula rebaptisa is a moth of the family Geometridae. It is found on the island of Grande Comore in the Comoros.
