= Eudipleurina viettei =

Scientific classification
- Kingdom: Animalia
- Phylum: Arthropoda
- Class: Insecta
- Order: Lepidoptera
- Family: Crambidae
- Genus: Eudipleurina
- Species: E. viettei

Binomial name
- Eudipleurina viettei Leraut, 1989

Species of moth

Eudipleurina viettei is a moth in the family Crambidae. It was described by Patrice J.A. Leraut in 1989. It is found on the Comoros, where it has been recorded from Grande Comore.
