= Lamprosema argyropalis =

Scientific classification
- Kingdom: Animalia
- Phylum: Arthropoda
- Class: Insecta
- Order: Lepidoptera
- Family: Crambidae
- Genus: Lamprosema
- Species: L. argyropalis

Binomial name
- Lamprosema argyropalis (Hampson, 1908)

Synonyms
- Nacoleia argyropalis Hampson, 1908; Nacoleia argyropalis hovalis Viette, 1958

Species of moth

Lamprosema argyropalis is a moth in the family Crambidae. It was described by George Hampson in 1908. It is found on Comoros (Mohéli, Mayotte, Anjouan) and in Madagascar.
