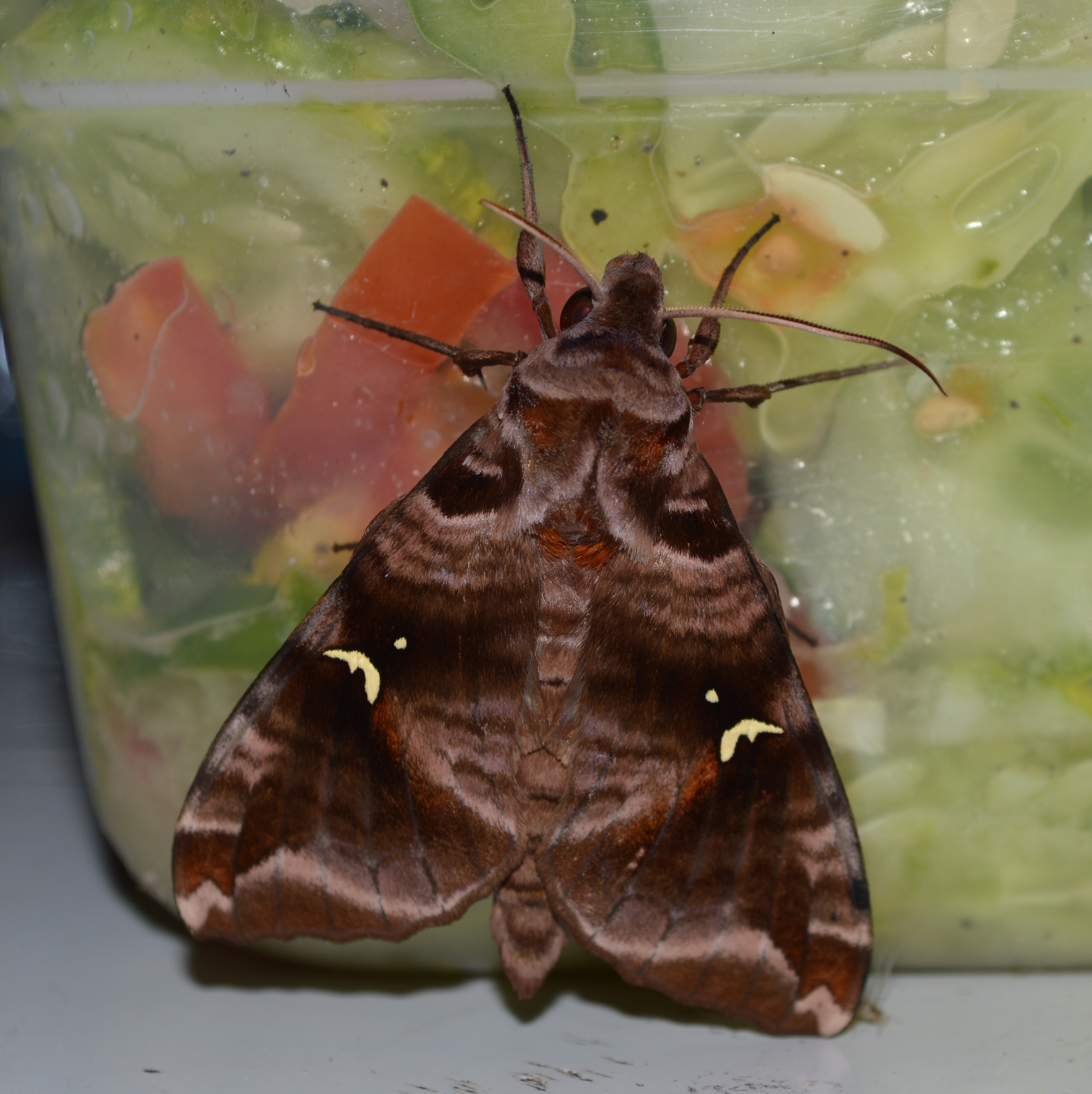
- Adult, Ranomafana National Park, Madagascar

Scientific classification
- Domain: Eukaryota
- Kingdom: Animalia
- Phylum: Arthropoda
- Class: Insecta
- Order: Lepidoptera
- Family: Sphingidae
- Genus: Maassenia
- Species: M. heydeni

Binomial name
- Maassenia heydeni (Saalmuller, 1884)

Synonyms
- Zonilia heydeni Saalmüller, 1878

= Maassenia heydeni =

Species of moth

Maassenia heydeni is a moth of the family Sphingidae. It is known from Madagascar and the Comoro Islands.

The wingspan is 50–80 mm.

== Subspecies ==
- Maassenia heydeni heydeni (Madagascar)
- Maassenia heydeni comorana Rothschild & Jordan, 1915 (Comoro Islands)
