= Scopula rufolutaria =

Scientific classification
- Domain: Eukaryota
- Kingdom: Animalia
- Phylum: Arthropoda
- Class: Insecta
- Order: Lepidoptera
- Family: Geometridae
- Genus: Scopula
- Species: S. rufolutaria

Binomial name
- Scopula rufolutaria (Mabille, 1900)

Synonyms
- Acidalia rufolutaria Mabille, 1900; Scopula gaudialis Prout, 1928

Species of geometer moth in subfamily Sterrhinae

Scopula rufolutaria is a moth of the family Geometridae. It is found in the Comoro Islands (Mayotte, Anjouan and Grande Comore) and Madagascar.
