= Exilisia leighi =

Scientific classification
- Kingdom: Animalia
- Phylum: Arthropoda
- Clade: Pancrustacea
- Class: Insecta
- Order: Lepidoptera
- Superfamily: Noctuoidea
- Family: Erebidae
- Subfamily: Arctiinae
- Genus: Exilisia
- Species: E. leighi

Binomial name
- Exilisia leighi (Toulgoët, 1956)

Synonyms
- Philenora leighi Toulgoët, 1956

Species of moth

Exilisia leighi is a moth of the subfamily Arctiinae. It was described by Hervé de Toulgoët in 1956. It is found on Mayotte in the Comoros.
