= Pyrausta bouveti =

Scientific classification
- Kingdom: Animalia
- Phylum: Arthropoda
- Class: Insecta
- Order: Lepidoptera
- Family: Crambidae
- Genus: Pyrausta
- Species: P. bouveti

Binomial name
- Pyrausta bouveti Viette, 1981

Species of moth

Pyrausta bouveti is a moth in the family Crambidae. It was described by Pierre Viette in 1981. It is found on the island of Grande Comore in the Comoros off the eastern coast of Africa.
