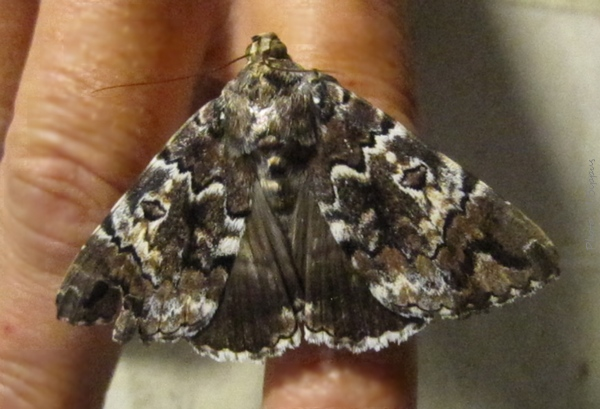

Scientific classification
- Kingdom: Animalia
- Phylum: Arthropoda
- Class: Insecta
- Order: Lepidoptera
- Superfamily: Noctuoidea
- Family: Erebidae
- Genus: Tolna
- Species: T. sypnoides

Binomial name
- Tolna sypnoides (Butler, 1878)

Synonyms
- Achaea sypnoides Butler, 1878; Tolna daedalea (Mabille, 1878); Ophiusa daedalea Mabille, 1878; Tolna meandrica (Saalmüller, 1891); Dysgonia meandrica Saalmüller, 1891

= Tolna sypnoides =

Species of moth

Tolna sypnoides is a species of moth of the family Erebidae first described by Arthur Gardiner Butler in 1878. It is found in Nigeria Sierra Leone, Ghana and South Africa, as well as in Madagascar and other islands of the Indian Ocean. They have a wingspan of around 70 mm.

The caterpillars of Tolna sypnoides feed on mango trees (Mangifera indica), Schinus terebinthifolius, both of the family of Anacardiaceae and Syzygium cumini (Myrtaceae).

== Gallery ==
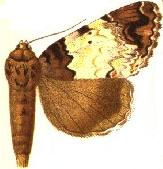
Male

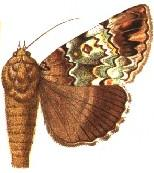
Female

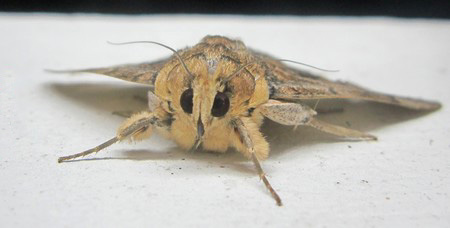

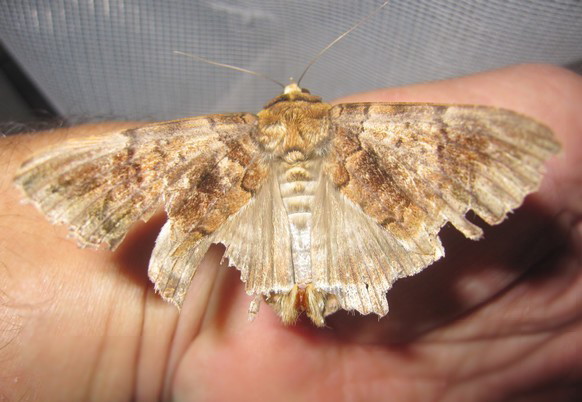

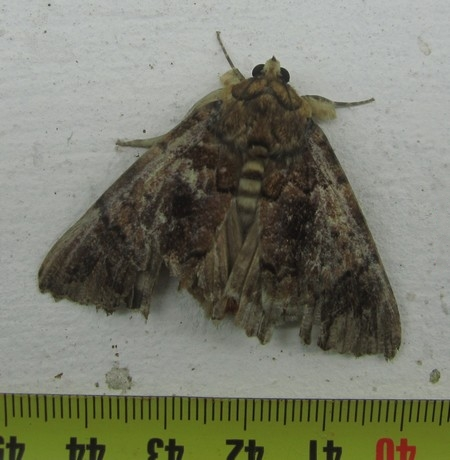

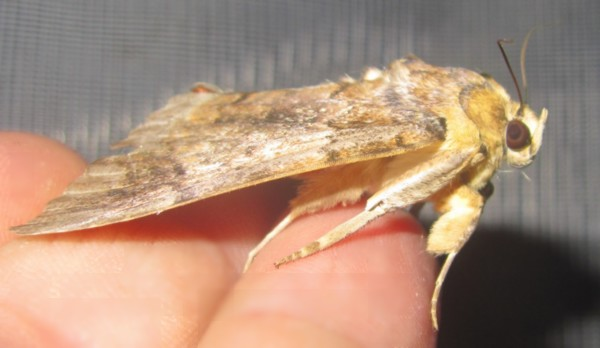
