= Ethmia comoriensis =

Scientific classification
- Kingdom: Animalia
- Phylum: Arthropoda
- Class: Insecta
- Order: Lepidoptera
- Family: Depressariidae
- Genus: Ethmia
- Species: E. comoriensis

Binomial name
- Ethmia comoriensis Viette, 1963

Species of moth

Ethmia comoriensis is a moth in the family Depressariidae. It is found on the Comoros off the eastern coast of Africa.

The larvae feed on Uncaria rhynchophylla.
