= Ancarista =

Scientific classification
- Kingdom: Animalia
- Phylum: Arthropoda
- Clade: Pancrustacea
- Class: Insecta
- Order: Lepidoptera
- Superfamily: Noctuoidea
- Family: Noctuidae
- Subfamily: Agaristinae
- Genus: Ancarista; Jordan, 1921
- Species: A. laminifera

Binomial name
- Ancarista laminifera (Saalmüller, 1878)

Synonyms
- Ovios laminifera Saalmüller, 1878; Euscirropterus laminifer Saalmüller, 1891; Ancarista laminifera comorana Viette, 1966

Genus of moths

Ancarista is a monotypic moth genus of the family Noctuidae erected by Karl Jordan in 1921. Its only species, Ancarista laminifera, was first described by Saalmüller in 1878. It is found on Madagascar and the Comoros.

== Taxonomy ==
The Global Lepidoptera Names Index gives this name as a synonym of Paratuerta Hampson, 1902.
