= Syllepte patagialis =

Scientific classification
- Domain: Eukaryota
- Kingdom: Animalia
- Phylum: Arthropoda
- Class: Insecta
- Order: Lepidoptera
- Family: Crambidae
- Genus: Syllepte
- Species: S. patagialis

Binomial name
- Syllepte patagialis (Zeller, 1852)

Synonyms
- Sylepta patagialis Zeller, 1852; Herpetogramma patagialis; Sylepta pataginalis Lederer, 1863; Sylepta undulalis Pagenstecher, 1907

Species of moth

Syllepte patagialis is a moth in the family Crambidae. It was described by Zeller in 1852. It is found in Cameroon, the Democratic Republic of Congo (Bas Congo, North Kivu), South Africa and on the Comoros.
