= Eupithecia alticomora =

Scientific classification
- Domain: Eukaryota
- Kingdom: Animalia
- Phylum: Arthropoda
- Class: Insecta
- Order: Lepidoptera
- Family: Geometridae
- Genus: Eupithecia
- Species: E. alticomora

Binomial name
- Eupithecia alticomora Herbulot, 1981

Species of moth

Eupithecia alticomora is a moth in the family Geometridae. It is found on the Comoros.
