= Ethmia ampanella =

Scientific classification
- Kingdom: Animalia
- Phylum: Arthropoda
- Class: Insecta
- Order: Lepidoptera
- Family: Depressariidae
- Genus: Ethmia
- Species: E. ampanella

Binomial name
- Ethmia ampanella Viette, 1976

Species of moth

Ethmia ampanella is a moth in the family Depressariidae. It is found on the Comoros.

== Appearance ==
The male moth has approximately a two centimeter wingspan. The wings are beige with black spots, with a second set of yellow wings under the first.
