= Lecithocera malacta =

Scientific classification
- Kingdom: Animalia
- Phylum: Arthropoda
- Class: Insecta
- Order: Lepidoptera
- Family: Lecithoceridae
- Genus: Lecithocera
- Species: L. malacta

Binomial name
- Lecithocera malacta Meyrick, 1918

Species of moth in the genus Lecithocera

Lecithocera malacta is a moth in the family Lecithoceridae. It was described by Edward Meyrick in 1918. It is found on Grande Comore in the Comoros, which are in the Indian Ocean.

The wingspan is about 14 mm. The forewings are light brownish ochreous, irregularly sprinkled with dark fuscous. The stigmata are moderate, cloudy and dark fuscous, the plical beneath the first discal, an additional dot beneath the second. The hindwings are whitish ochreous, slightly sprinkled with fuscous towards the apex.
