= Eupithecia bolespora =

Scientific classification
- Kingdom: Animalia
- Phylum: Arthropoda
- Clade: Pancrustacea
- Class: Insecta
- Order: Lepidoptera
- Family: Geometridae
- Genus: Eupithecia
- Species: E. bolespora

Binomial name
- Eupithecia bolespora Prout L.B., 1937

Species of moth

Eupithecia bolespora is a moth in the family Geometridae. It is found on the Comoros.
