= Nausinoe capensis =

Scientific classification
- Kingdom: Animalia
- Phylum: Arthropoda
- Class: Insecta
- Order: Lepidoptera
- Family: Crambidae
- Genus: Nausinoe
- Species: N. capensis

Binomial name
- Nausinoe capensis (Walker, 1866)

Synonyms
- Lepyrodes capensis Walker, 1866

Species of moth

Nausinoe capensis is a moth in the family Crambidae. It was described by Francis Walker in 1866. It is found on the Comoros and Seychelles and in Kenya and South Africa.
