= Syllepte rubrifucalis =

Scientific classification
- Domain: Eukaryota
- Kingdom: Animalia
- Phylum: Arthropoda
- Class: Insecta
- Order: Lepidoptera
- Family: Crambidae
- Genus: Syllepte
- Species: S. rubrifucalis

Binomial name
- Syllepte rubrifucalis Mabille, 1900

Synonyms
- Coptobasoides rubrifucalis

Species of moth

Syllepte rubrifucalis is a moth in the family Crambidae. It was described by Paul Mabille in 1900. It is found on Madagascar.
