= Scopula cornishi =

Scientific classification
- Domain: Eukaryota
- Kingdom: Animalia
- Phylum: Arthropoda
- Class: Insecta
- Order: Lepidoptera
- Family: Geometridae
- Genus: Scopula
- Species: S. cornishi

Binomial name
- Scopula cornishi Prout, 1932

Species of geometer moth in subfamily Sterrhinae

Scopula cornishi is a moth of the family Geometridae. It was described by Prout in 1932. It is found on Madagascar and the Comoros.

It has a wingspan of 23–28 millimetres (0.91–1.10 in).
