= Eupithecia exheres =

Scientific classification
- Domain: Eukaryota
- Kingdom: Animalia
- Phylum: Arthropoda
- Class: Insecta
- Order: Lepidoptera
- Family: Geometridae
- Genus: Eupithecia
- Species: E. exheres

Binomial name
- Eupithecia exheres Herbulot, 1954

Species of moth

Eupithecia exheres is a moth in the family Geometridae. It is found in Madagascar.
