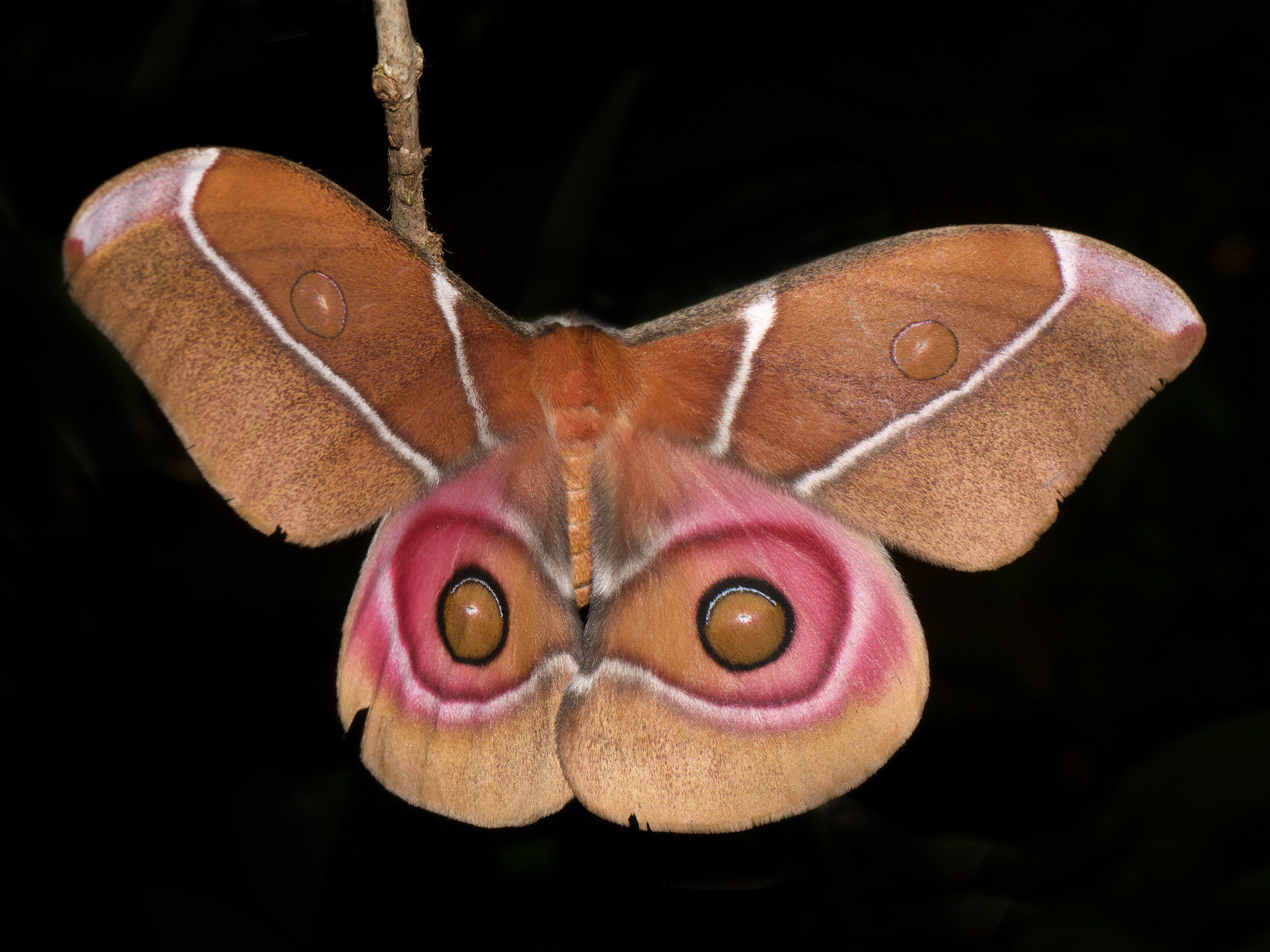

Scientific classification
- Domain: Eukaryota
- Kingdom: Animalia
- Phylum: Arthropoda
- Class: Insecta
- Order: Lepidoptera
- Family: Saturniidae
- Genus: Antherina; Leach, 1815
- Species: A. suraka

Binomial name
- Antherina suraka (Boisduval 1833)

Synonyms
- Antherina comorana Viette, 1965

= Antherina =

Genus of moths

Antherina is a monotypic moth genus in the family Saturniidae erected by William Elford Leach in 1815. Its only species, Antherina suraka, the Suraka silk moth, was first described by Jean Baptiste Boisduval in 1833. It is found on Madagascar and Mayotte. Both larvae and pupae consumed in parts of Madagascar, but not to a great extent. The larvae feed on oleander, privet, willows, beech, Liquidambar, Crataegus (hawthorns), grapevine, lilac, cherry, laurel, Forsythia, Rhus, Pistacia, apple, pear, plum and peach leaves, but foodplants differ from species to species. They start off black with yellow protrusions to eventually green with red and yellow on their bodies. Once they've finished growing they will be as thick as your finger and when they have reached their final days as a caterpillar they will develop a blue dorsal stripe and wander around looking for a place to pupate.

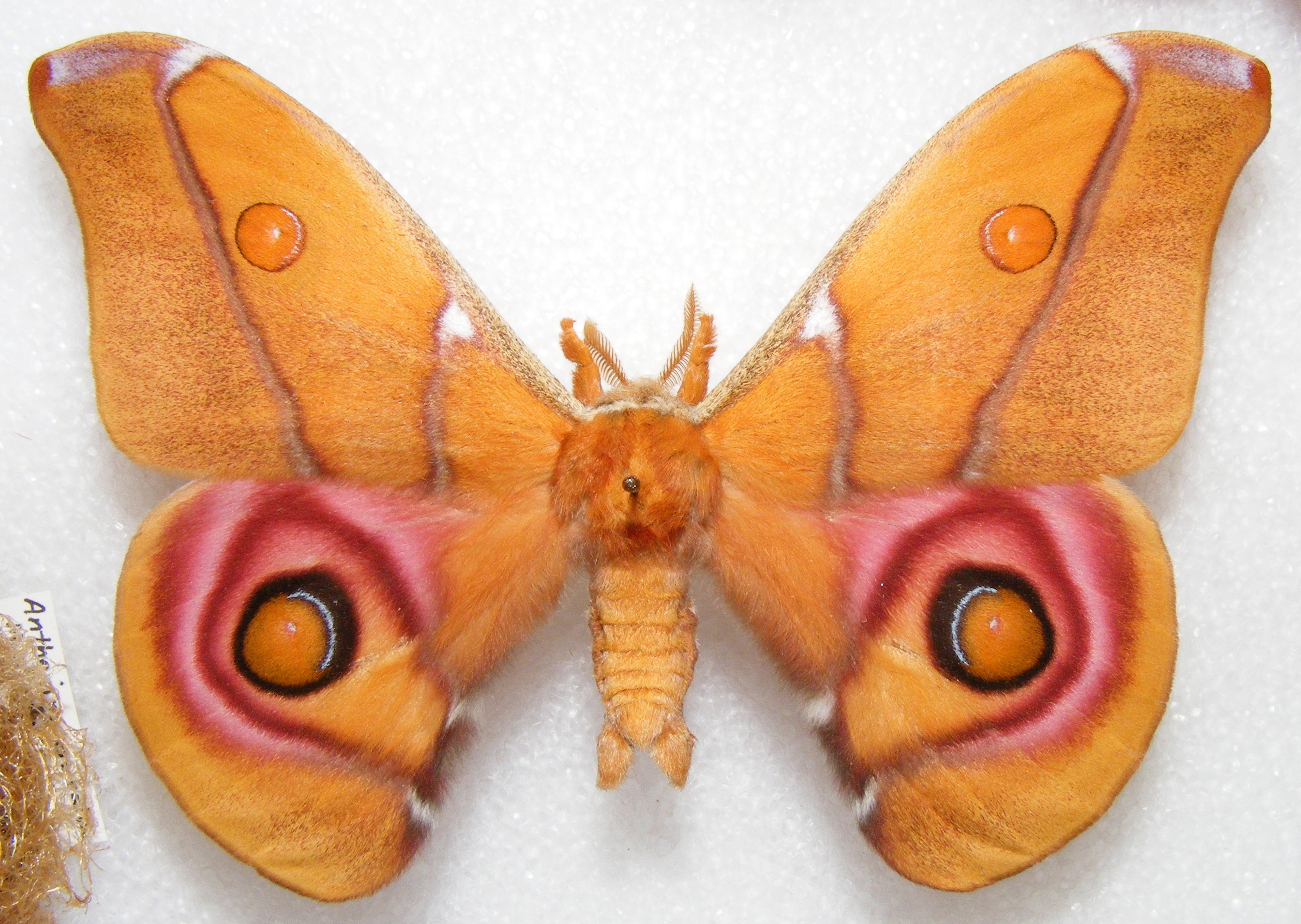
Antherina suraka suraka

== Subspecies ==
- Antherina suraka suraka (Madagascar)
- Antherina suraka comorana (Mayotte)
