= Viettesia matilei =

Scientific classification
- Domain: Eukaryota
- Kingdom: Animalia
- Phylum: Arthropoda
- Class: Insecta
- Order: Lepidoptera
- Superfamily: Noctuoidea
- Family: Erebidae
- Subfamily: Arctiinae
- Genus: Viettesia
- Species: V. matilei

Binomial name
- Viettesia matilei Toulgoët, 1978

Species of moth

Viettesia matilei is a moth in the subfamily Arctiinae. It was described by Hervé de Toulgoët in 1978. It is found in the Comoros in the Indian Ocean.
