= Euphyciodes albotessulalis =

Scientific classification
- Domain: Eukaryota
- Kingdom: Animalia
- Phylum: Arthropoda
- Class: Insecta
- Order: Lepidoptera
- Family: Crambidae
- Genus: Euphyciodes
- Species: E. albotessulalis

Binomial name
- Euphyciodes albotessulalis (Mabille, 1900)

Synonyms
- Chalcidoptera albo-tessulalis Mabille, 1900

Species of moth

Euphyciodes albotessulalis is a moth in the family Crambidae. It was described by Paul Mabille in 1900. It is found on the Comoros and in Madagascar.

== Subspecies ==
- Euphyciodes albotessulalis albotessulalis
- Euphyciodes albotessulalis comoralis Viette, 1960 (Comoros: Anjouan)
