= Fodinoidea pupieri =

Scientific classification
- Kingdom: Animalia
- Phylum: Arthropoda
- Class: Insecta
- Order: Lepidoptera
- Superfamily: Noctuoidea
- Family: Erebidae
- Subfamily: Arctiinae
- Genus: Fodinoidea
- Species: F. pupieri

Binomial name
- Fodinoidea pupieri Toulgoët, 1972

Species of moth

Fodinoidea pupieri is a moth of the family Erebidae. It was described by Hervé de Toulgoët in 1972. It is found on the Comoros.
