= Exilisia quadripunctata =

Scientific classification
- Kingdom: Animalia
- Phylum: Arthropoda
- Class: Insecta
- Order: Lepidoptera
- Superfamily: Noctuoidea
- Family: Erebidae
- Subfamily: Arctiinae
- Genus: Exilisia
- Species: E. quadripunctata

Binomial name
- Exilisia quadripunctata Toulgoët, 1956

Synonyms
- Mimulosia quadripunctaria (Toulgoët, 1956)

Species of moth

Exilisia quadripunctata is a moth of the subfamily Arctiinae. It was described by Hervé de Toulgoët in 1956. It is found in the Comoro Islands.
