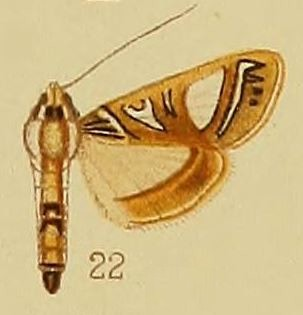

Scientific classification
- Kingdom: Animalia
- Phylum: Arthropoda
- Clade: Pancrustacea
- Class: Insecta
- Order: Lepidoptera
- Family: Crambidae
- Genus: Glyphodes
- Species: G. boseae

Binomial name
- Glyphodes boseae Saalmüller, 1880

Synonyms
- Glyphodes mayottalis Hampson, 1908

= Glyphodes boseae =

Species of moth

Glyphodes boseae is a moth of the family Crambidae. It was described by Max Saalmüller in 1880 and it is found in Madagascar.

This species has ochreous-yellow forewings, dusted with brown-and-black scales at the edges and in the middle. It has four pearl coloured cellspots. The hindwings are translucent pearlish yellowish with a dark brown shine in the middle. The body is ochreous brown. The wingspan of this species is about 14 mm.
