= Dipleurinodes nigra =

Scientific classification
- Kingdom: Animalia
- Phylum: Arthropoda
- Class: Insecta
- Order: Lepidoptera
- Family: Crambidae
- Genus: Dipleurinodes
- Species: D. nigra

Binomial name
- Dipleurinodes nigra Leraut, 1989

Species of moth

Dipleurinodes nigra is a moth in the family Crambidae. It was described by Patrice J.A. Leraut in 1989. It is found on the Comoros, where it has been recorded from Grande Comore.
