= Exilisia variegata =

Scientific classification
- Kingdom: Animalia
- Phylum: Arthropoda
- Class: Insecta
- Order: Lepidoptera
- Superfamily: Noctuoidea
- Family: Erebidae
- Subfamily: Arctiinae
- Genus: Exilisia
- Species: E. variegata

Binomial name
- Exilisia variegata Toulgoët, 1972

Species of moth

Exilisia variegata is a moth of the subfamily Arctiinae. It was described by Hervé de Toulgoët in 1972. It is found on the Comoros and Madagascar.
