= Scopula malagasy =

Scientific classification
- Kingdom: Animalia
- Phylum: Arthropoda
- Clade: Pancrustacea
- Class: Insecta
- Order: Lepidoptera
- Family: Geometridae
- Genus: Scopula
- Species: S. malagasy

Binomial name
- Scopula malagasy (Viette, 1977)

Synonyms
- Antitrygodes malagasy Viette, 1977

Species of geometer moth in subfamily Sterrhinae

Scopula malagasy is a moth of the family Geometridae. It was described by Viette in 1977. It is endemic to Madagascar.
