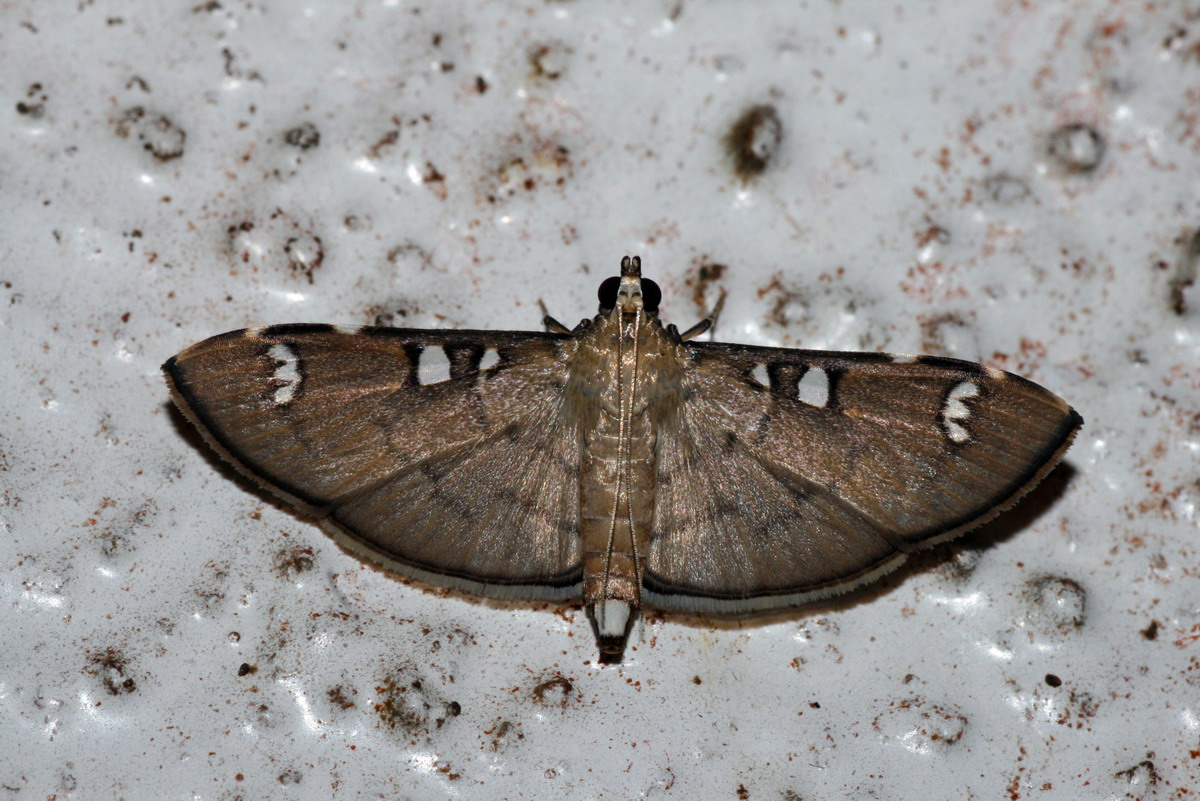
- Related moth species

Scientific classification
- Kingdom: Animalia
- Phylum: Arthropoda
- Class: Insecta
- Order: Lepidoptera
- Family: Crambidae
- Genus: Coptobasoides
- Species: C. comoralis

Binomial name
- Coptobasoides comoralis Viette, 1960

= Coptobasoides comoralis =

Species of moth

Coptobasoides comoralis is a moth in the family Crambidae. It was described by Viette in 1960. It is found on the Comoros.
