= Eupithecia ericeti =

Scientific classification
- Domain: Eukaryota
- Kingdom: Animalia
- Phylum: Arthropoda
- Class: Insecta
- Order: Lepidoptera
- Family: Geometridae
- Genus: Eupithecia
- Species: E. ericeti

Binomial name
- Eupithecia ericeti Herbulot, 1970

Species of moth

Eupithecia ericeti is a species of moth of the family Geometridae described by Claude Herbulot in 1970. It is found in northern Madagascar.

It looks similar to Eupethicia graphiticata (de Joannis) but is a little bigger. The length of its front wings is 12 mm.

== Subspecies ==
- Eupithecia ericeti ericeti
- Eupithecia ericeti abacta Herbulot, 1978
