= Stenochora =

Scientific classification
- Kingdom: Animalia
- Phylum: Arthropoda
- Class: Insecta
- Order: Lepidoptera
- Family: Crambidae
- Subfamily: Pyraustinae
- Genus: Stenochora; Warren, 1892
- Species: S. lancinalis

Binomial name
- Stenochora lancinalis (Guenée, 1854)

Synonyms
- Rhodaria lancinalis Guenée, 1854; Ischnurges lancinalis aldabrensis Viette, 1958; Ischnurges comorensis Viette, 1958; Botys expeditalis Lederer, 1863; Ischnurges paulianalis Marion, 1954

Genus of moths

Stenochora is a genus of moths of the family Crambidae. It contains only one species, Stenochora lancinalis, the lanced pearl, which is found in southern and south-eastern Africa and the African islands of the Indian Ocean. The range includes Botswana, the Comoros (Mohéli, Grande Comore), the Democratic Republic of Congo, La Réunion, Madagascar, Mauritius, Mozambique, the Seychelles (Aldabra), South Africa, Tanzania, Zambia and Zimbabwe.

This species has a wingspan of about 25 mm-30mm and long and narrow forewings.

The larvae feed on Clerodendrum glabrum.

== Subspecies ==
- Ischnurges lancinalis lancinalis (Mauritius, La Réunion)
- Ischnurges lancinalis paulianalis Marion, 1954 (Madagascar)
- Ischnurges lancinalis aldabrensis Viette, 1958 (Aldabra (Seychelles))
- Ischnurges lancinalis comorensis Viette, 1958 (Comoros)
