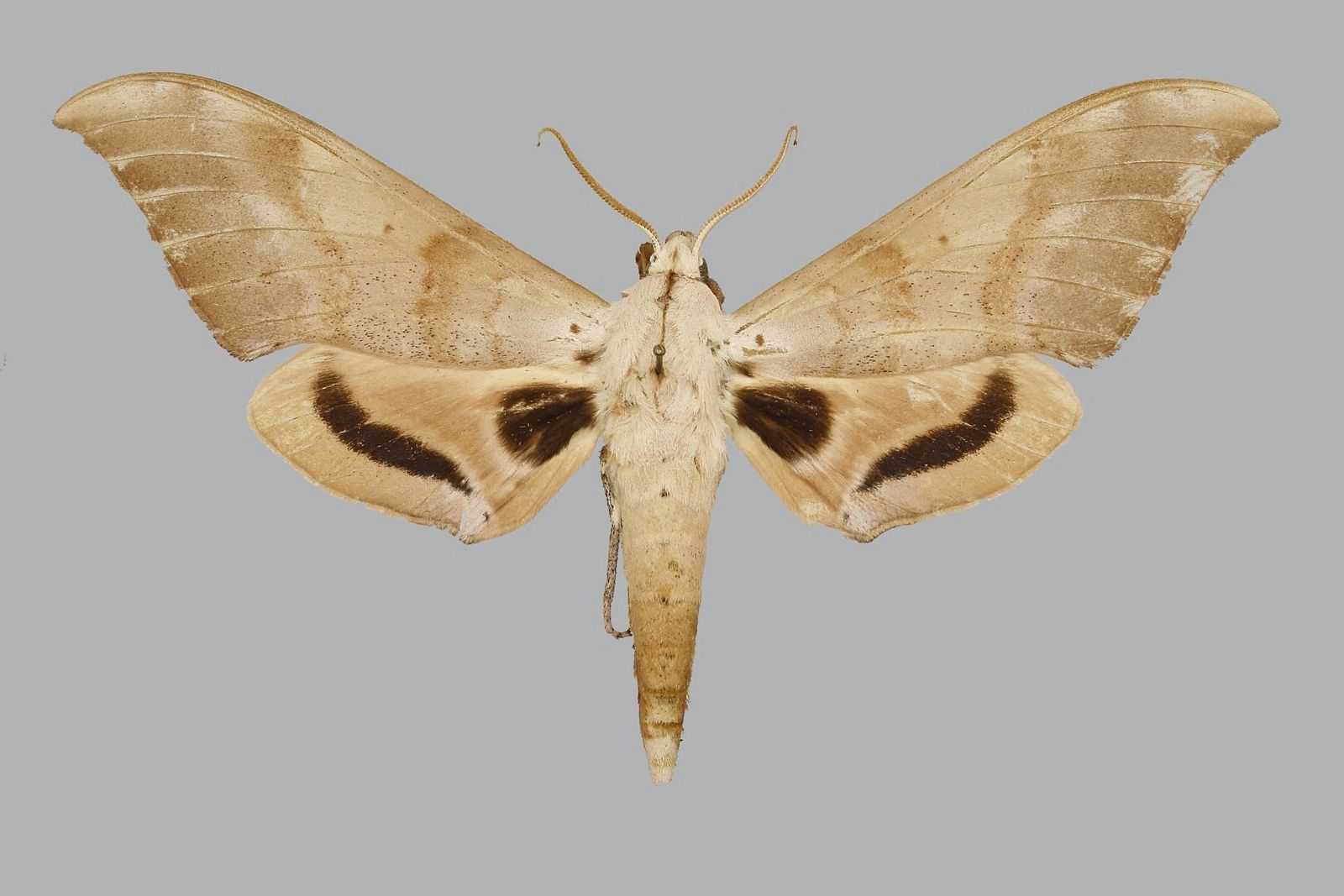

Scientific classification
- Kingdom: Animalia
- Phylum: Arthropoda
- Class: Insecta
- Order: Lepidoptera
- Family: Sphingidae
- Tribe: Smerinthini
- Genus: Dargeclanis; Eitschberger, 2007
- Species: D. grandidieri

Binomial name
- Dargeclanis grandidieri (Mabille, 1879)

Synonyms
- Ambulyx grandidieri Mabille, 1879; Pseudoclanis grandidieri; Ambulyx watersii Butler, 1884; Pseudosmerinthus semnus Karsch, 1900

= Dargeclanis =

Genus of moths

Dargeclanis is a genus of moths in the family Sphingidae, consisting of one species, Dargeclanis grandidieri, which is known from Madagascar and the Comoros.

== Species ==
- Dargeclanis grandidieri grandidieri (Madagascar)
- Dargeclanis grandidieri comorana (Rothschild & Jordan, 1916) (Comoros)
