= Scopula bistrigata =

Scientific classification
- Domain: Eukaryota
- Kingdom: Animalia
- Phylum: Arthropoda
- Class: Insecta
- Order: Lepidoptera
- Family: Geometridae
- Genus: Scopula
- Species: S. bistrigata

Binomial name
- Scopula bistrigata (Pagenstecher, 1907)

Synonyms
- Timandra bistrigata Pagenstecher, 1907

Species of geometer moth in subfamily Sterrhinae

Scopula bistrigata is a moth of the family Geometridae. It was described by Pagenstecher in 1907. It is found on Madagascar and the Comoros.
