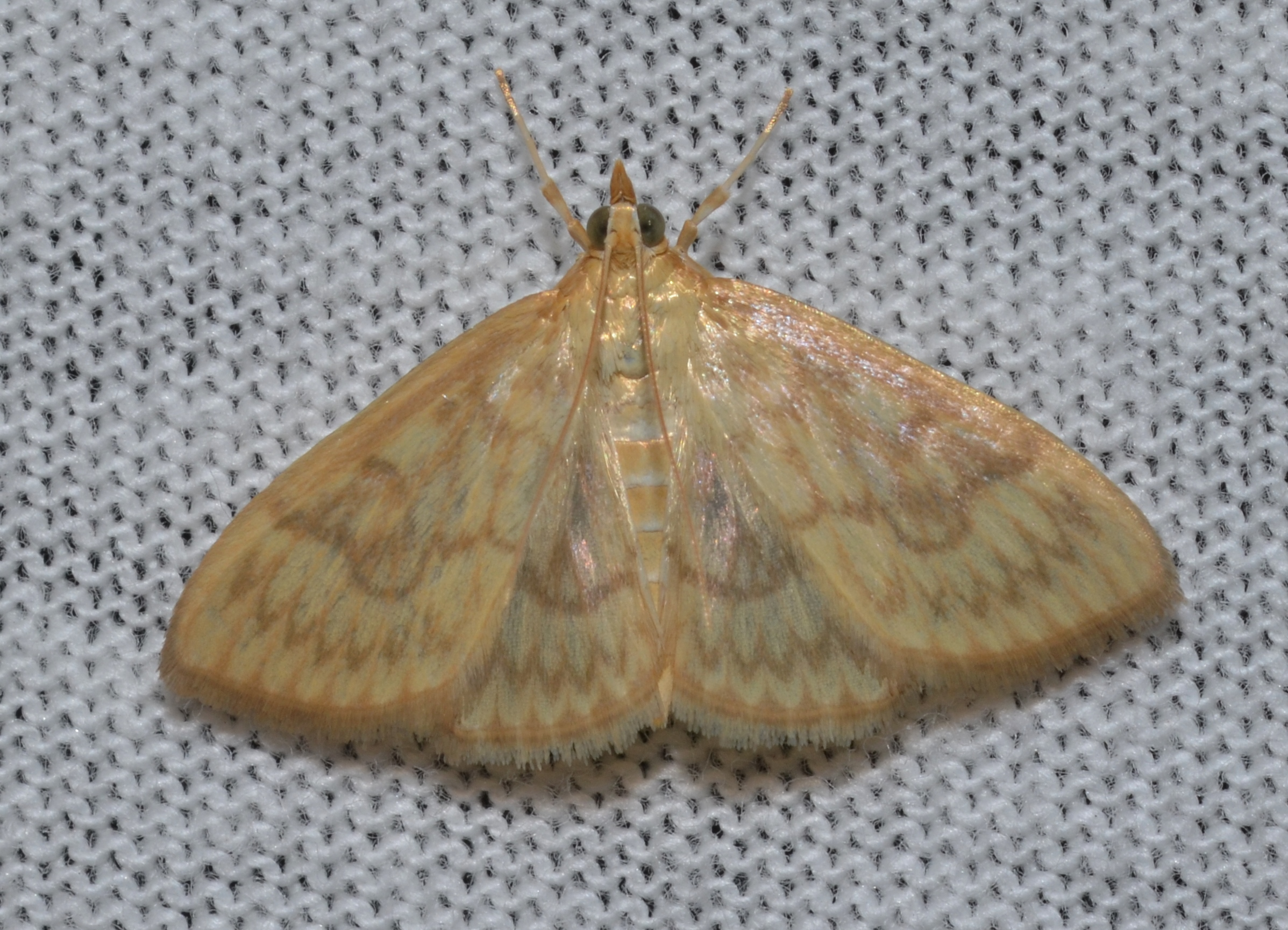
- Crocidophora serratissimalis

Scientific classification
- Kingdom: Animalia
- Phylum: Arthropoda
- Clade: Pancrustacea
- Class: Insecta
- Order: Lepidoptera
- Family: Crambidae
- Subfamily: Pyraustinae
- Genus: Crocidophora; Lederer, 1863

Synonyms
- Crocidosema (lapsus, nec Zeller, 1847); Monocrocis Warren, 1895

= Crocidophora =

Genus of moths

Crocidophora is a genus of moths in the family Crambidae erected by Julius Lederer in 1863.

== Species ==
- (formerly) Crocidophora acutangulalis (Swinhoe, 1894)
- Crocidophora amoenalis Snellen, 1890
- Crocidophora argentealis Hampson, 1893
- Crocidophora bicoloralis Swinhoe, 1906
- Crocidophora caffralis Hampson, 1910
- Crocidophora coloratalis Tams in Caradja, 1927
- Crocidophora craspedalis Hampson, 1913
- Crocidophora cuprotinctalis Caradja, 1932
- Crocidophora discolorata Swinhoe, 1894
- Crocidophora distinctalis Swinhoe, 1894
- Crocidophora elongalis Viette, 1978
- Crocidophora exstigmalis Hampson, 1903
- Crocidophora fasciata (Moore, 1888)
- Crocidophora flavicilialis Snellen, 1890
- Crocidophora flavofasciata (Moore, 1888)
- Crocidophora habisalis (Walker, 1859)
- Crocidophora lutusalis Snellen, 1890
- Crocidophora nectariphila Strand, 1918
- Crocidophora obscuralis South in Leech & South, 1901
- Crocidophora pustuliferalis Lederer, 1863
- Crocidophora rufalis Hampson, 1893
- Crocidophora sepialis Caradja, 1927
- Crocidophora serratissimalis Zeller, 1872
- Crocidophora tienmushana Caradja & Meyrick, 1935
- Crocidophora tuberculalis Lederer, 1863
- Crocidophora zonalis Caradja, 1925

== Former species ==
- Crocidophora carapina Strand, 1918
- Crocidophora kosemponialis Strand, 1918
- Crocidophora sinisalis (Walker, 1859)
- Crocidophora velialis Gaede, 1917
