= Sinibotys butleri =

Scientific classification
- Kingdom: Animalia
- Phylum: Arthropoda
- Clade: Pancrustacea
- Class: Insecta
- Order: Lepidoptera
- Family: Crambidae
- Genus: Sinibotys
- Species: S. butleri

Binomial name
- Sinibotys butleri (South in Leech & South, 1901)

Synonyms
- Crocidophora butleri South in Leech & South, 1901

Species of moth

Sinibotys butleri is a snout moth in the subfamily Pyraustinae in the family Crambidae. It was described in the genus Crocidophora by Richard South in 1901 based on a single female imago collected in Ningbo in China's Zhejiang province. The species is sexually dimorphic, with females exhibiting shorter, less pointed forewings than the males. The imagines and genitalia of the species are illustrated in Lee et al. (2018).

== Biology ==
The caterpillars feed on leaves of the bamboo species Phyllostachys edulis and P. nigra forma henonis in Japan.

== Distribution ==
The species was originally described from China, and was later also recorded from Japan, specifically from Honshu. Lee et al. (2018) reported the species for the first time from Korea.

The species was apparently transported via larvae to a large-scale garden centre in Spain, from where it spread further over Europe. Caterpillars were subsequently reported from Belgium in 2013 and 2015, from the Netherlands in 2014, and from France in 2015, where it is now recorded from the departments of Gironde, Landes and Pyrénées-Atlantiques. The first German record is from June 2018 from Munich.
