= Asura punctilineata =

Scientific classification
- Domain: Eukaryota
- Kingdom: Animalia
- Phylum: Arthropoda
- Class: Insecta
- Order: Lepidoptera
- Superfamily: Noctuoidea
- Family: Erebidae
- Subfamily: Arctiinae
- Genus: Asura
- Species: A. punctilineata

Binomial name
- Asura punctilineata Wileman & South, 1919

Species of moth

Asura punctilineata is a moth of the family Erebidae first described by Alfred Ernest Wileman and Richard South in 1919. It is found on Luzon, in the Philippines.
