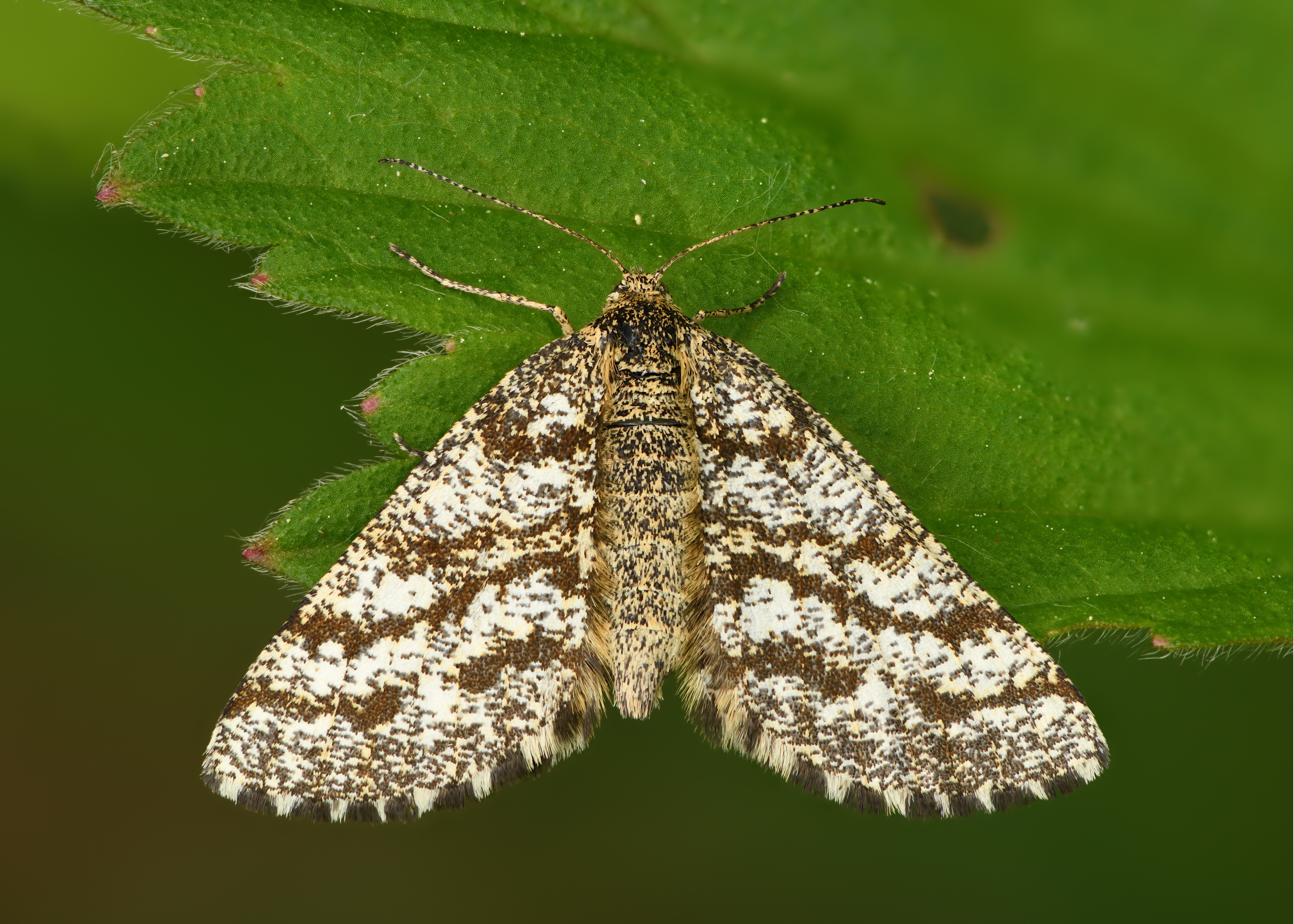
- Female
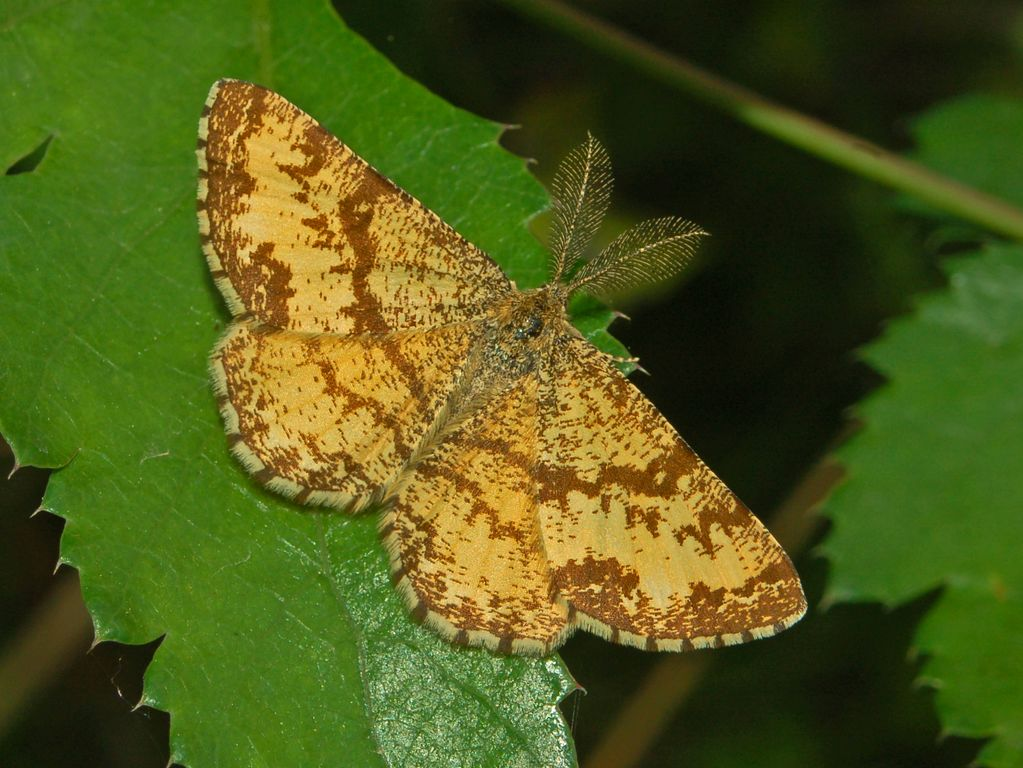
- Male

Scientific classification
- Kingdom: Animalia
- Phylum: Arthropoda
- Class: Insecta
- Order: Lepidoptera
- Family: Geometridae
- Genus: Ematurga
- Species: E. atomaria

Binomial name
- Ematurga atomaria (Linnaeus, 1758)

= Ematurga atomaria =

Species of moth

Ematurga atomaria, the common heath, is a moth of the family Geometridae.

The species can be found in the Palearctic realm from the Iberian Peninsula in the west, central and eastern Europe and east to Siberia and Sakhalin. In the south, its range includes the northern Mediterranean and the Turkish part of the Black Sea region.

The wingspan is 24–34 millimetres (0.9–1.3 in). The colour is variable ranging from yellow brown to dark brown. The appearance is mottled with bands and spots. The brown cross bands on both forewings and hindwings vary in width and there may be no cross bands at all only small dark brownish spots. Males have comb-like antennae. Females are usually brown with a dusting of white but can be almost white with a series of brown crosslines. The egg is elongated and green to yellow-red. The caterpillar is slim, smooth and up to 30 millimeters long. The colour is very variable as with the moth; it ranges from brown to yellowish, grey to violet-grey. The dorsal line is dark, and the side stripes are light and wavy. The pupa is yellow-brown and spotted. The cremaster is long and forked at the end.

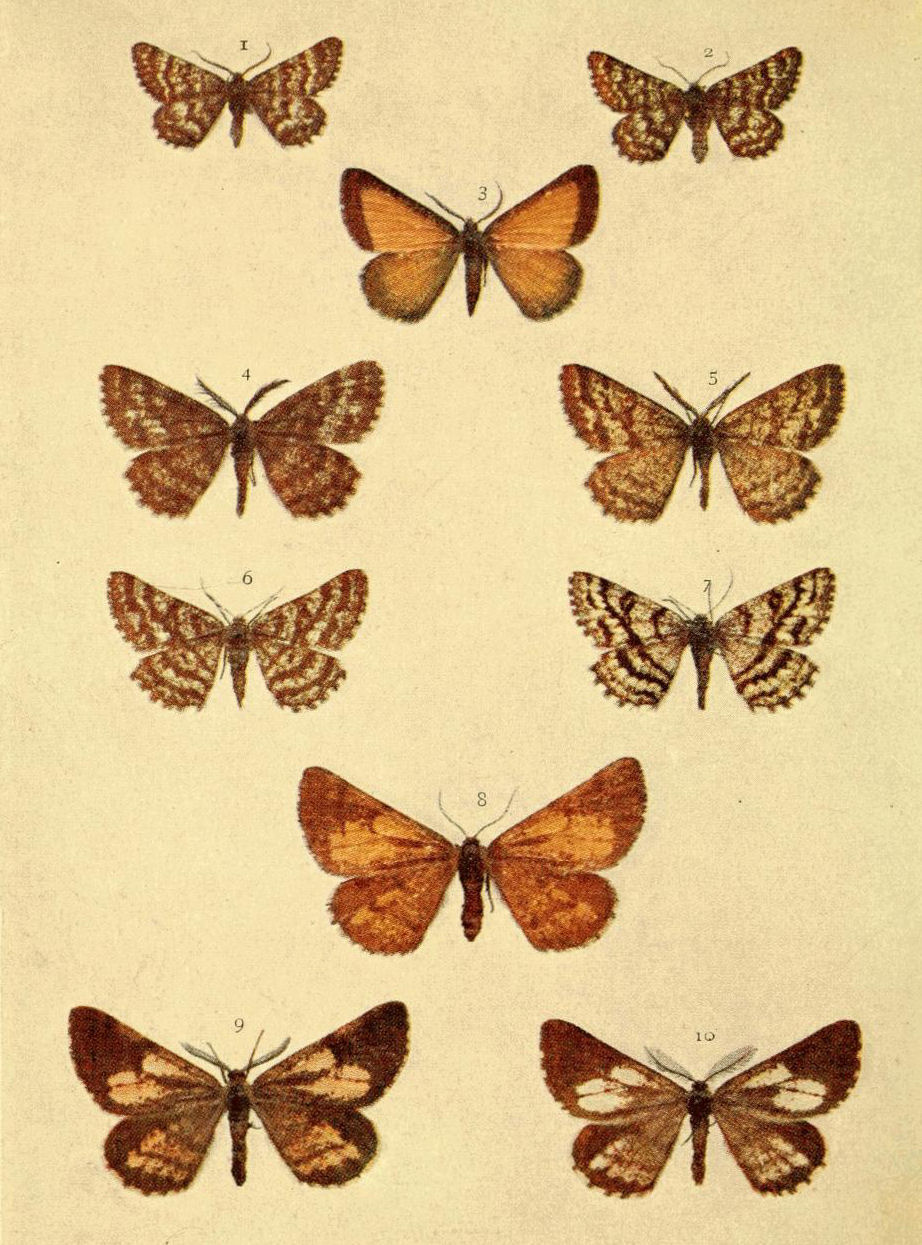
Moths of the British Isles Series 2 Plate141

== South's Moths ==
Richard South had this to say "Four specimens of this variable species are shown on Plate 141 (Figs. 4, 5 ♂, 6, 7 ♀). The general colour of all the wings in the male is ochreous, inclining to whitish or to brownish. Usually the wings are speckled with brown, and the cross lines, or bands, are dark brown. Occasionally the cross markings are absent; but more frequently the three lines on the fore wings are much broadened and more or less united, sometimes forming a central band in which are a few ochreous scales towards the front margin: ab. obsoletaria, Zetterstedt. Dark brown or blackish specimens (ab. unicolorata, Staudinger) are captured now and then in the southern counties of England, but such uniform dark varieties are more frequent in the north (Staffordshire and Yorkshire). The female is white in colour, and usually only lightly speckled with blackish; the cross lines are more conspicuous, as a rule, than in the male, but they are subject to pretty much the same kind of aberration. Sometimes examples of this sex greatly resemble Fidonia carbonaria, and have been confused with that species by Haworth and other entomologists in the past. An abnormal specimen with six wings has been recorded, and Barrett mentions a gynandrous example—the right side like a small dark female, and the left an ordinary male; both antennæ shortly pectinated.

The caterpillar, according to Fenn, is variable in colour and markings, all shades of brown, greenish brown, ochreous, purple, and grey; in some examples there are pale diamonds, and in others whitish spots, along the back. It feeds on ling and heath, and will eat clover, trefoils, broom, etc.: July and August, and occasionally September. The moth is out in May and June, and sometimes there are specimens on the wing in August. Abundant on almost every heath throughout the British Isles, except in the Shetlands.

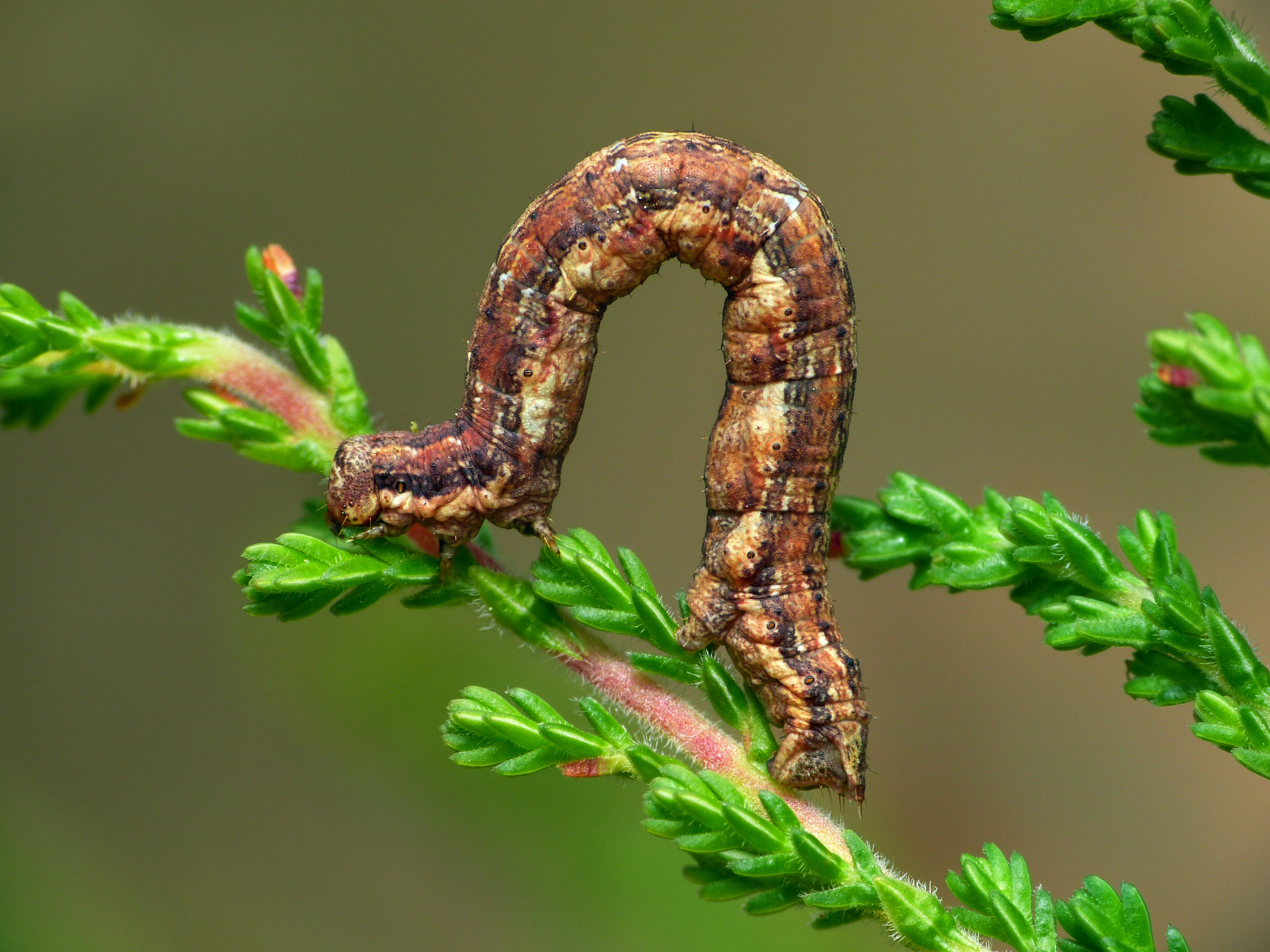
larva

The moths fly in one generation from May to June in the British Isles. In other parts of the range there is a second generation from June to September. The caterpillars feed on a heather, heath and clovers.
