= Limbobotys acutangulalis =

Scientific classification
- Domain: Eukaryota
- Kingdom: Animalia
- Phylum: Arthropoda
- Class: Insecta
- Order: Lepidoptera
- Family: Crambidae
- Genus: Limbobotys
- Species: L. acutangulalis

Binomial name
- Limbobotys acutangulalis (C. Swinhoe, 1894)

Synonyms
- Circobotys acutangulalis Swinhoe, 1894; Crocidophora acutangulalis Swinhoe, 1894

Species of moth

Limbobotys acutangulalis is a moth in the subfamily Pyraustinae of the family Crambidae. It was described by Charles Swinhoe in 1894 based on material collected in the Indian state of Meghalaya. The species was described in the genus Circobotys, and later placed in Crocidophora; in 2025, it was transferred to Limbobotys.
