= Paracymoriza laminalis =

Scientific classification
- Kingdom: Animalia
- Phylum: Arthropoda
- Class: Insecta
- Order: Lepidoptera
- Family: Crambidae
- Genus: Paracymoriza
- Species: P. laminalis

Binomial name
- Paracymoriza laminalis (Hampson in Leech & South, 1901)

Synonyms
- Aulacodes laminalis Hampson, 1901

Species of moth

Paracymoriza laminalis is a moth in the family Crambidae. It was described by George Hampson in 1901. It is found in the Chinese provinces of Jiangsu, Zhejiang, Fujian, Jiangxi, Hubei, Hunan, Guangdong, Guangxi, Guizhou and Shaanxi and in Taiwan.
