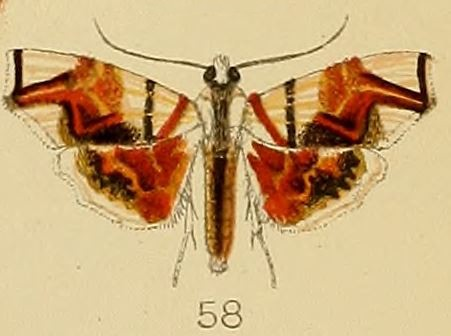

Scientific classification
- Kingdom: Animalia
- Phylum: Arthropoda
- Clade: Pancrustacea
- Class: Insecta
- Order: Lepidoptera
- Family: Crambidae
- Subfamily: Musotiminae
- Genus: Parthenodes; Guenée, 1854

= Parthenodes =

Genus of moths

Parthenodes is a genus of moths of the family Crambidae.

== Species ==
- Parthenodes ankasokalis (Viette, 1958)
- Parthenodes eugethes (Tams, 1935)
- Parthenodes hydrocampalis (Guenée, 1854)
- Parthenodes nigriplaga (Swinhoe, 1894)
- Parthenodes paralleloidalis
- Parthenodes rectangulalis (Kenrick, 1907)

== Former species ==
- Parthenodes latifascialis (Warren, 1896)
- Parthenodes sutschana (Hampson, 1900)
