= Diathraustodes fulvofusa =

Scientific classification
- Kingdom: Animalia
- Phylum: Arthropoda
- Class: Insecta
- Order: Lepidoptera
- Family: Crambidae
- Genus: Diathraustodes
- Species: D. fulvofusa

Binomial name
- Diathraustodes fulvofusa Hampson in Leech & South, 1901

Species of moth

Diathraustodes fulvofusa is a species of moth in the family Crambidae. It was described by George Hampson in 1901. It is found in India and China.
