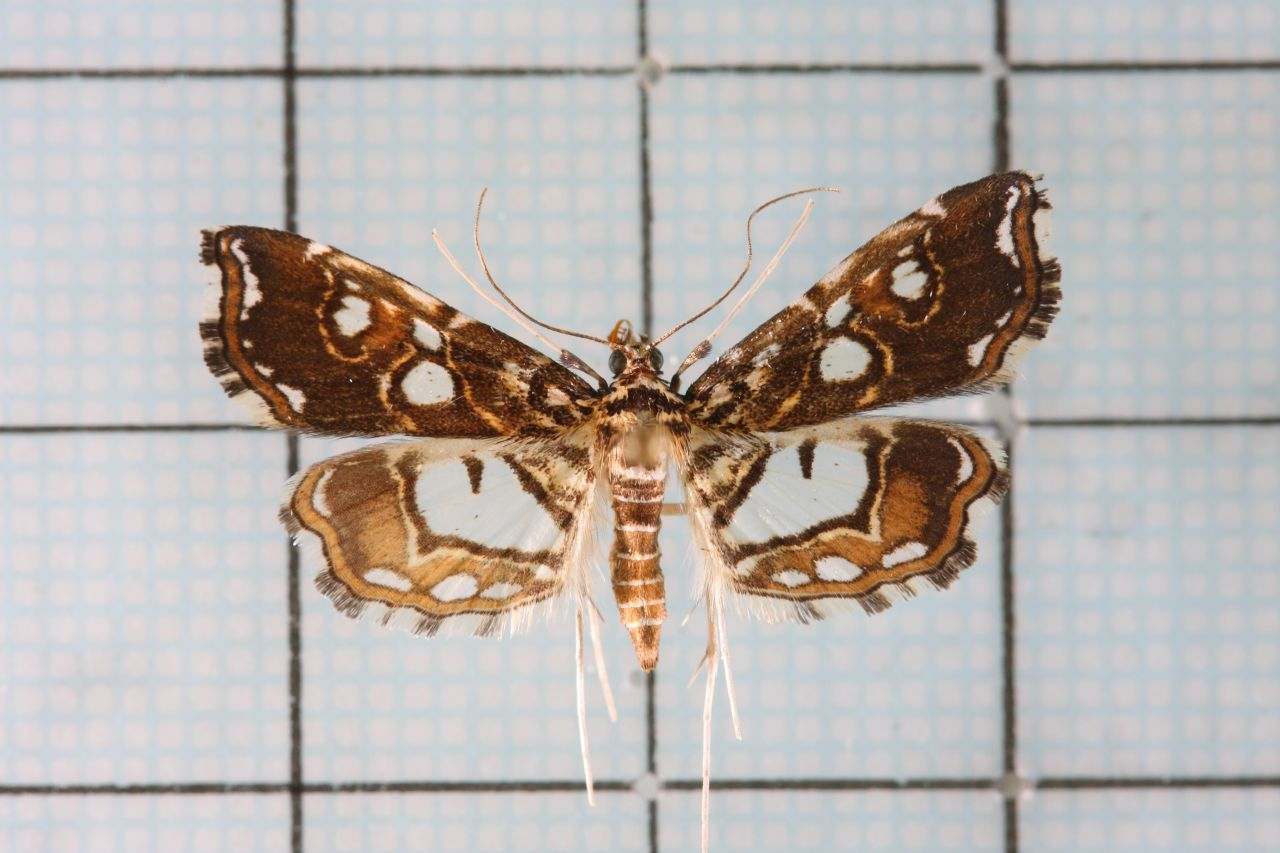

Scientific classification
- Domain: Eukaryota
- Kingdom: Animalia
- Phylum: Arthropoda
- Class: Insecta
- Order: Lepidoptera
- Family: Crambidae
- Genus: Paracymoriza
- Species: P. taiwanalis

Binomial name
- Paracymoriza taiwanalis (Wileman & South, 1917)

Synonyms
- Parthenodes taiwanalis Wileman & South, 1917

= Paracymoriza taiwanalis =

Species of moth

Paracymoriza taiwanalis is a moth of the family Crambidae described by Alfred Ernest Wileman and Richard South in 1917. It is found in Taiwan.
