= Crocidophora bicoloralis =

Scientific classification
- Domain: Eukaryota
- Kingdom: Animalia
- Phylum: Arthropoda
- Class: Insecta
- Order: Lepidoptera
- Family: Crambidae
- Genus: Crocidophora
- Species: C. bicoloralis

Binomial name
- Crocidophora bicoloralis C. Swinhoe, 1906

Species of moth

Crocidophora bicoloralis is a moth in the family Crambidae. It was described by Charles Swinhoe in 1906. It is found on Borneo.
