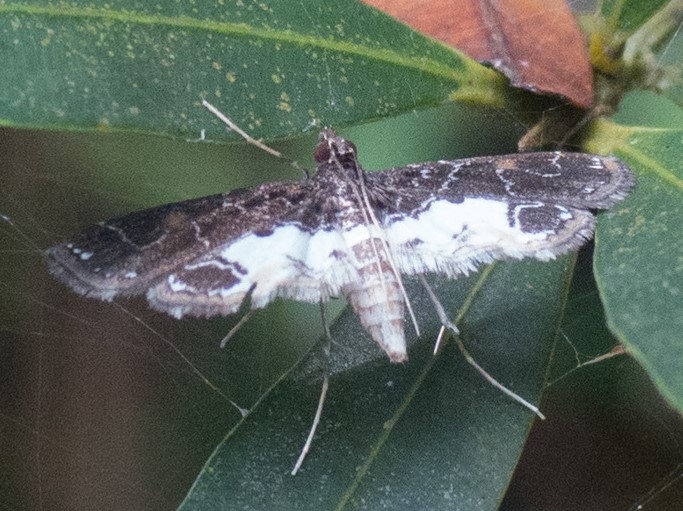

Scientific classification
- Kingdom: Animalia
- Phylum: Arthropoda
- Class: Insecta
- Order: Lepidoptera
- Family: Crambidae
- Genus: Paracymoriza
- Species: P. albifascialis

Binomial name
- Paracymoriza albifascialis Hampson, 1891

= Paracymoriza albifascialis =

Species of moth

Paracymoriza albifascialis is a species of moth in the family Crambidae. It was first described by George Hampson in 1891. It is found in the Nilgiris District in India.
