= Paracymoriza multispinea =

Scientific classification
- Domain: Eukaryota
- Kingdom: Animalia
- Phylum: Arthropoda
- Class: Insecta
- Order: Lepidoptera
- Family: Crambidae
- Genus: Paracymoriza
- Species: P. multispinea

Binomial name
- Paracymoriza multispinea You, Wang & Li in You, Wang, Li & Chen, 2003

Species of moth

Paracymoriza multispinea is a moth in the family Crambidae. It was described by Ping You, Shu-Xia Wang and Hou-Hun Li in 2003. It is found in the Chinese provinces of Fujian, Hunan and Guizhou.

The length of the forewings is 7–8 mm for males and 8-8.5 mm for females.
