= Paracymoriza albimaculata =

Scientific classification
- Kingdom: Animalia
- Phylum: Arthropoda
- Clade: Pancrustacea
- Class: Insecta
- Order: Lepidoptera
- Family: Crambidae
- Genus: Paracymoriza
- Species: P. albimaculata

Binomial name
- Paracymoriza albimaculata F.Q. Chen, S.M. Song & C.S. Wu, 2007

Species of moth

Paracymoriza albimaculata is a moth in the family Crambidae. It was described by Fu-Qiang Chen, Shi-Mei Song and Chun-Sheng Wu in 2007. It is found in Guangxi, China.
