= Crocidophora sepialis =

Scientific classification
- Domain: Eukaryota
- Kingdom: Animalia
- Phylum: Arthropoda
- Class: Insecta
- Order: Lepidoptera
- Family: Crambidae
- Genus: Crocidophora
- Species: C. sepialis

Binomial name
- Crocidophora sepialis Caradja, 1927

Species of moth

Crocidophora sepialis is a moth in the family Crambidae. It was described by Aristide Caradja in 1927. It is found in China.
