= Paracymoriza reductalis =

Scientific classification
- Domain: Eukaryota
- Kingdom: Animalia
- Phylum: Arthropoda
- Class: Insecta
- Order: Lepidoptera
- Family: Crambidae
- Genus: Paracymoriza
- Species: P. reductalis

Binomial name
- Paracymoriza reductalis (Caradja, 1925)

Synonyms
- Aulacodes reductalis Caradja, 1925

Species of moth

Paracymoriza reductalis is a moth in the family Crambidae. It was described by Aristide Caradja in 1925. It is found in the Chinese provinces of Guangdong, Hainan and Sichuan.
