= Limbobotys ptyophora =

Scientific classification
- Kingdom: Animalia
- Phylum: Arthropoda
- Class: Insecta
- Order: Lepidoptera
- Family: Crambidae
- Genus: Limbobotys
- Species: L. ptyophora

Binomial name
- Limbobotys ptyophora (Hampson, 1896)

Synonyms
- Crocidophora ptyophora Hampson, 1896

Species of moth

Limbobotys ptyophora is a moth in the family Crambidae. It was described by George Hampson in 1896. It is found in Sikkim, India.
