= Paracymoriza okinawanus =

Scientific classification
- Kingdom: Animalia
- Phylum: Arthropoda
- Clade: Pancrustacea
- Class: Insecta
- Order: Lepidoptera
- Family: Crambidae
- Genus: Paracymoriza
- Species: P. okinawanus

Binomial name
- Paracymoriza okinawanus (Yoshiyasu & Arita, 1992)

Synonyms
- Parthenodes okinawanus Yoshiyasu & Arita, 1992

Species of moth

Paracymoriza okinawanus is a moth in the family Crambidae. It was described by Yutaka Yoshiyasu and Yutaka Arita in 1992. It is found in Okinawa, Japan.
