= Paracymoriza loricatalis =

Scientific classification
- Domain: Eukaryota
- Kingdom: Animalia
- Phylum: Arthropoda
- Class: Insecta
- Order: Lepidoptera
- Family: Crambidae
- Genus: Paracymoriza
- Species: P. loricatalis

Binomial name
- Paracymoriza loricatalis (Lederer, 1863)

Synonyms
- Cymoriza loricatalis Lederer, 1863

Species of moth

Paracymoriza loricatalis is a moth in the family Crambidae. It was described by Julius Lederer in 1863. It is found on the Maluku Islands in Indonesia.
