= Diathraustodes =

Scientific classification
- Kingdom: Animalia
- Phylum: Arthropoda
- Class: Insecta
- Order: Lepidoptera
- Family: Crambidae
- Subfamily: Acentropinae
- Genus: Diathraustodes; Hampson, 1896

Genus of moths

Diathraustodes is a genus of moths of the family Crambidae.

== Species ==
- Diathraustodes amoenialis (Christoph, 1881)
- Diathraustodes fulvofusa Hampson in Leech & South, 1901
- Diathraustodes leucotrigona Hampson, 1896
- Diathraustodes similis Hampson, 1903
