= Crocidophora discolorata =

Scientific classification
- Domain: Eukaryota
- Kingdom: Animalia
- Phylum: Arthropoda
- Class: Insecta
- Order: Lepidoptera
- Family: Crambidae
- Genus: Crocidophora
- Species: C. discolorata

Binomial name
- Crocidophora discolorata C. Swinhoe, 1894

Species of moth

Crocidophora discolorata is a moth in the family Crambidae. It was described by Charles Swinhoe in 1894. It is found in the Indian state of Meghalaya.
