= Circobotys plebeia =

Scientific classification
- Domain: Eukaryota
- Kingdom: Animalia
- Phylum: Arthropoda
- Class: Insecta
- Order: Lepidoptera
- Family: Crambidae
- Genus: Circobotys
- Species: C. plebeia

Binomial name
- Circobotys plebeia Munroe & Mutuura, 1969

Species of moth

Circobotys plebeia is a moth in the family Crambidae. It was described by Eugene G. Munroe and Akira Mutuura in 1969. It is found in Shaanxi, China.
