= Circobotys brevivittalis =

Scientific classification
- Kingdom: Animalia
- Phylum: Arthropoda
- Class: Insecta
- Order: Lepidoptera
- Family: Crambidae
- Genus: Circobotys
- Species: C. brevivittalis

Binomial name
- Circobotys brevivittalis (Hampson, 1996)

Synonyms
- Phlyctaenodes brevivittalis Hampson, 1996

Species of moth

Circobotys brevivittalis is a moth in the family Crambidae. It was described by George Hampson in 1996. It is found in India.
