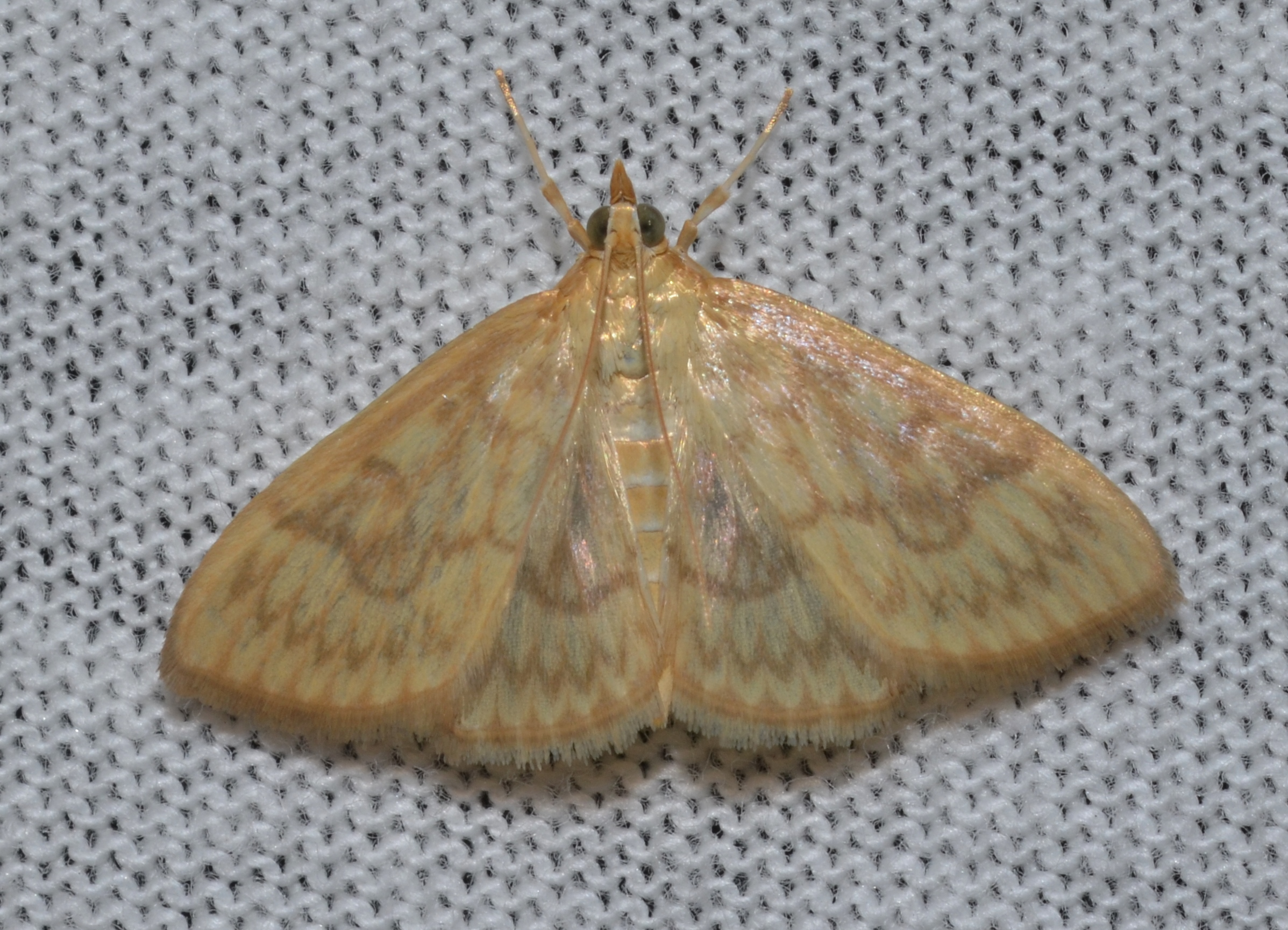

Scientific classification
- Kingdom: Animalia
- Phylum: Arthropoda
- Clade: Pancrustacea
- Class: Insecta
- Order: Lepidoptera
- Family: Crambidae
- Genus: Crocidophora
- Species: C. serratissimalis

Binomial name
- Crocidophora serratissimalis Zeller, 1872

Synonyms
- Botis subdentalis Grote, 1873

= Crocidophora serratissimalis =

Species of moth

Crocidophora serratissimalis, the angelic crocidophora moth or sawtoothed crocidophora, is a moth in the family Crambidae. It was described by Zeller in 1872. It is found in North America, where it has been recorded from Quebec and New England to South Carolina, west to Manitoba and possibly Texas.

The wingspan is 18–25 mm. Adults are on wing from June to September.

The larvae have been recorded feeding on Leersia oryzoides.
