= Paracymoriza stigmatalis =

Scientific classification
- Domain: Eukaryota
- Kingdom: Animalia
- Phylum: Arthropoda
- Class: Insecta
- Order: Lepidoptera
- Family: Crambidae
- Genus: Paracymoriza
- Species: P. stigmatalis

Binomial name
- Paracymoriza stigmatalis (C. Swinhoe, 1894)

Synonyms
- Micromania stigmatalis C. Swinhoe, 1894

Species of moth

Paracymoriza stigmatalis is a moth in the family Crambidae. It was described by Charles Swinhoe in 1894. It is found in northeast India's Khasi Hills.
