= Paracymoriza bleszynskialis =

Scientific classification
- Kingdom: Animalia
- Phylum: Arthropoda
- Clade: Pancrustacea
- Class: Insecta
- Order: Lepidoptera
- Family: Crambidae
- Genus: Paracymoriza
- Species: P. bleszynskialis

Binomial name
- Paracymoriza bleszynskialis Roesler & Speidel, 1981

Species of moth

Paracymoriza bleszynskialis is a moth in the family Crambidae. It was described by Rolf-Ulrich Roesler and Wolfgang Speidel in 1981. It is found in China (Sichuan, Zhejiang, Hubei, Hunan, Guizhou).
