= Paracymoriza oxygona =

Scientific classification
- Kingdom: Animalia
- Phylum: Arthropoda
- Class: Insecta
- Order: Lepidoptera
- Family: Crambidae
- Genus: Paracymoriza
- Species: P. oxygona

Binomial name
- Paracymoriza oxygona (Meyrick, 1894)

Synonyms
- Hydrocampa oxygona Meyrick, 1894

Species of moth

Paracymoriza oxygona is a moth in the family Crambidae. It was described by Edward Meyrick in 1894. It is found on Sumbawa in Indonesia.
