= Paracymoriza olivalis =

Scientific classification
- Kingdom: Animalia
- Phylum: Arthropoda
- Class: Insecta
- Order: Lepidoptera
- Family: Crambidae
- Genus: Paracymoriza
- Species: P. olivalis

Binomial name
- Paracymoriza olivalis Hampson, 1891

Synonyms
- Paracymoriza dentifascialis Hampson, 1891

Species of moth

Paracymoriza olivalis is a moth in the family Crambidae. It was described by George Hampson in 1891. It is found in the Nilgiris District of India.
