= Paracymoriza prodigalis =

Scientific classification
- Domain: Eukaryota
- Kingdom: Animalia
- Phylum: Arthropoda
- Class: Insecta
- Order: Lepidoptera
- Family: Crambidae
- Genus: Paracymoriza
- Species: P. prodigalis

Binomial name
- Paracymoriza prodigalis (Leech, 1889)

Synonyms
- Cataclysta prodigalis Leech, 1889; Parthenodes bifurcalis Wileman, 1911

Species of moth

Paracymoriza prodigalis is a moth in the family Crambidae. It was described by John Henry Leech in 1889. It is found in China (Hebei, Zhejiang, Fujian, Henan, Hubei, Guangdong, Sichuan, Guizhou), Taiwan, Korea and Japan.
