= Crocidophora flavicilialis =

Scientific classification
- Kingdom: Animalia
- Phylum: Arthropoda
- Class: Insecta
- Order: Lepidoptera
- Family: Crambidae
- Genus: Crocidophora
- Species: C. flavicilialis

Binomial name
- Crocidophora flavicilialis Snellen, 1890

Species of moth

Crocidophora flavicilialis is a moth in the family Crambidae. It was described by Snellen in 1890. It is found in India (Sikkim).
