= Crocidophora elongalis =

Scientific classification
- Kingdom: Animalia
- Phylum: Arthropoda
- Clade: Pancrustacea
- Class: Insecta
- Order: Lepidoptera
- Family: Crambidae
- Genus: Crocidophora
- Species: C. elongalis

Binomial name
- Crocidophora elongalis Viette, 1978

Synonyms
- Crocidophora elongalis angazidzia Viette, 1981

Species of moth

Crocidophora elongalis is a moth in the family Crambidae. It was described by Viette in 1978. It is found in Madagascar and on the Comoros.
