= Parthenodes eugethes =

Scientific classification
- Domain: Eukaryota
- Kingdom: Animalia
- Phylum: Arthropoda
- Class: Insecta
- Order: Lepidoptera
- Family: Crambidae
- Genus: Parthenodes
- Species: P. eugethes

Binomial name
- Parthenodes eugethes Tams, 1935

Species of moth

Parthenodes eugethes is a moth in the family Crambidae. It was described by Willie Horace Thomas Tams in 1935. It is found on Samoa.
