= Paracymoriza albalis =

Scientific classification
- Domain: Eukaryota
- Kingdom: Animalia
- Phylum: Arthropoda
- Class: Insecta
- Order: Lepidoptera
- Family: Crambidae
- Genus: Paracymoriza
- Species: P. albalis

Binomial name
- Paracymoriza albalis Yoshiyasu, 1987

Species of moth

Paracymoriza albalis is a moth in the family Crambidae. It was described by Yoshiyasu in 1987. It is found in Thailand.
