= Parthenodes paralleloidalis =

Scientific classification
- Domain: Eukaryota
- Kingdom: Animalia
- Phylum: Arthropoda
- Class: Insecta
- Order: Lepidoptera
- Family: Crambidae
- Genus: Parthenodes
- Species: P. paralleloidalis

Binomial name
- Parthenodes paralleloidalis Klima, 1937

Synonyms
- Parthenodes parallelalis Hampson, 1917

Species of moth

Parthenodes paralleloidalis is a moth in the family Crambidae.
