= Callibotys wilemani =

Scientific classification
- Domain: Eukaryota
- Kingdom: Animalia
- Phylum: Arthropoda
- Class: Insecta
- Order: Lepidoptera
- Family: Crambidae
- Genus: Callibotys
- Species: C. wilemani

Binomial name
- Callibotys wilemani Munroe & Mutuura, 1969

Species of moth

Callibotys wilemani is a moth in the family Crambidae. It was described by Eugene G. Munroe and Akira Mutuura in 1969. It is found in Japan.
