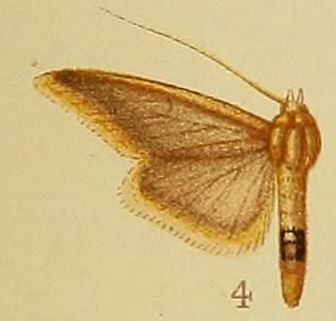

Scientific classification
- Kingdom: Animalia
- Phylum: Arthropoda
- Class: Insecta
- Order: Lepidoptera
- Family: Crambidae
- Genus: Circobotys
- Species: C. flaviciliata

Binomial name
- Circobotys flaviciliata (Hampson, 1910)

Synonyms
- Crocidophora flaviciliata Hampson, 1910

= Circobotys flaviciliata =

Species of moth

Circobotys flaviciliata is a moth in the family Crambidae. It was described by George Hampson in 1910. It is found in the Democratic Republic of the Congo.
