= Diathraustodes similis =

Scientific classification
- Kingdom: Animalia
- Phylum: Arthropoda
- Class: Insecta
- Order: Lepidoptera
- Family: Crambidae
- Genus: Diathraustodes
- Species: D. similis

Binomial name
- Diathraustodes similis Hampson, 1903

Species of moth

Diathraustodes similis is a species of moth in the family Crambidae. It was described by George Hampson in 1903. It is found in India (Khasis).
