= Circobotys malaisei =

Scientific classification
- Domain: Eukaryota
- Kingdom: Animalia
- Phylum: Arthropoda
- Class: Insecta
- Order: Lepidoptera
- Family: Crambidae
- Genus: Circobotys
- Species: C. malaisei

Binomial name
- Circobotys malaisei Munroe & Mutuura, 1970

Species of moth

Circobotys malaisei is a moth in the family Crambidae. It was described by Eugene G. Munroe and Akira Mutuura in 1970. It is found in Myanmar.
