= Sinibotys obliquilinealis =

Scientific classification
- Kingdom: Animalia
- Phylum: Arthropoda
- Class: Insecta
- Order: Lepidoptera
- Family: Crambidae
- Genus: Sinibotys
- Species: S. obliquilinealis

Binomial name
- Sinibotys obliquilinealis Inoue, 1982

Species of moth

Sinibotys obliquilinealis is a moth in the family Crambidae. It was described by Hiroshi Inoue in 1982. It is found in Japan.
