= Paracymoriza ectargyralis =

Scientific classification
- Kingdom: Animalia
- Phylum: Arthropoda
- Class: Insecta
- Order: Lepidoptera
- Family: Crambidae
- Genus: Paracymoriza
- Species: P. ectargyralis

Binomial name
- Paracymoriza ectargyralis (Hampson, 1897)

Synonyms
- Parthenodes ectargyralis Hampson, 1897; Cataclysta orbicula Whalley, 1962

Species of moth

Paracymoriza ectargyralis is a moth in the family Crambidae. It was described by George Hampson in 1897. It is found on New Guinea (Fergusson Island) and on the Solomon Islands.
