= Paracymoriza phlegetonalis =

Scientific classification
- Kingdom: Animalia
- Phylum: Arthropoda
- Class: Insecta
- Order: Lepidoptera
- Family: Crambidae
- Genus: Paracymoriza
- Species: P. phlegetonalis

Binomial name
- Paracymoriza phlegetonalis (Snellen, 1895)

Synonyms
- Hydrocampa phlegetonalis Snellen, 1895; Paracymoriza semialbida Warren, 1896

Species of moth

Paracymoriza phlegetonalis is a moth in the family Crambidae. It was described by Snellen in 1895. It is found in India and on Java.
