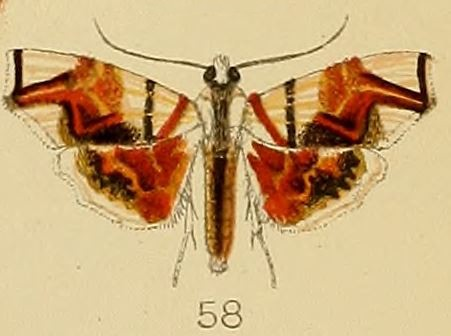

Scientific classification
- Domain: Eukaryota
- Kingdom: Animalia
- Phylum: Arthropoda
- Class: Insecta
- Order: Lepidoptera
- Family: Crambidae
- Genus: Parthenodes
- Species: P. rectangulalis

Binomial name
- Parthenodes rectangulalis Kenrick, 1907

= Parthenodes rectangulalis =

Species of moth

Parthenodes rectangulalis is a moth in the family Crambidae. It was described by George Hamilton Kenrick in 1907. It is found on New Guinea.
