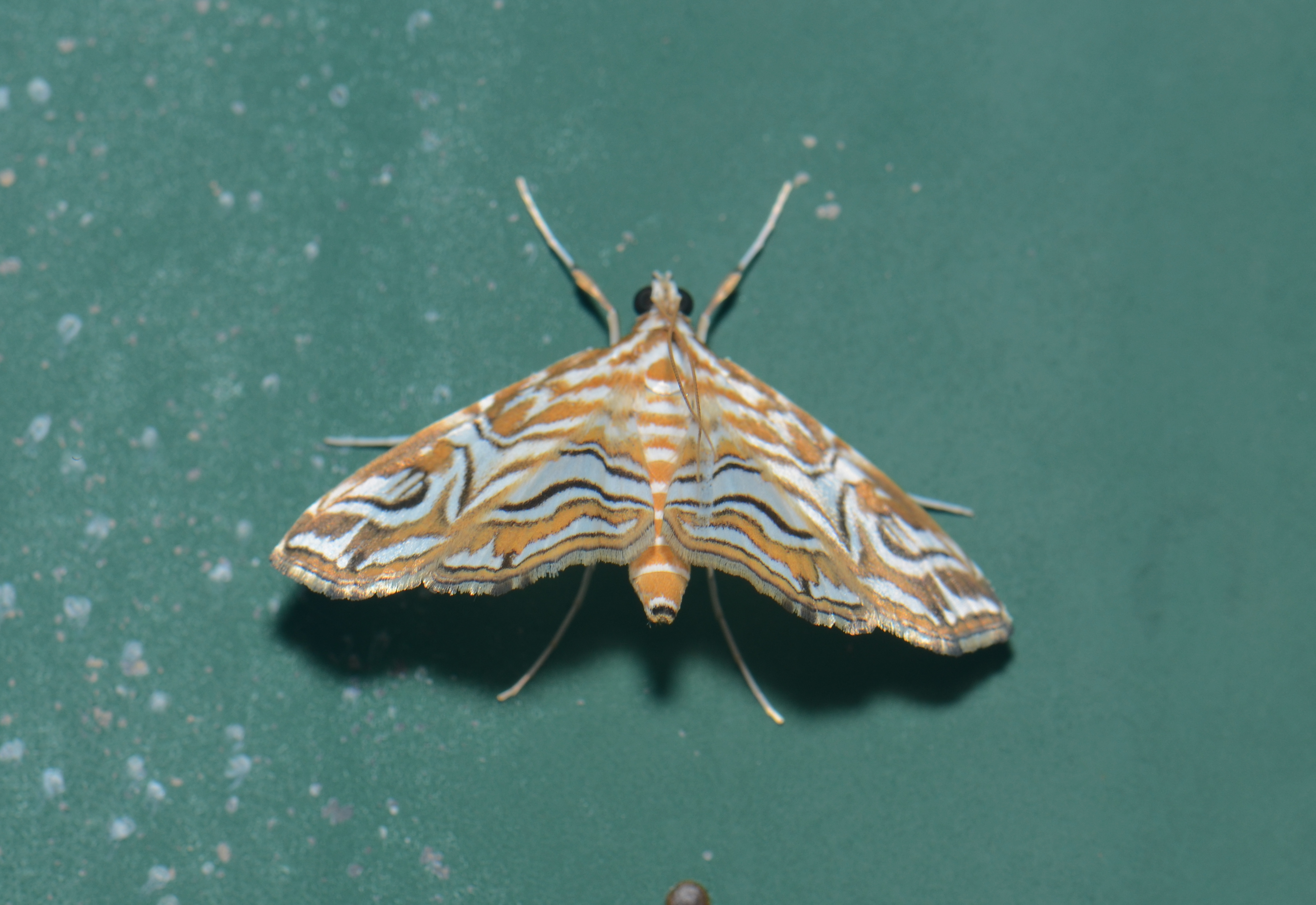

Scientific classification
- Kingdom: Animalia
- Phylum: Arthropoda
- Class: Insecta
- Order: Lepidoptera
- Family: Crambidae
- Genus: Paracymoriza
- Species: P. vagalis

Binomial name
- Paracymoriza vagalis (Walker, 1866)

Synonyms
- Oligostigma vagalis Walker, 1866; Hydrocampa exsolvalis Snellen, 1880

= Paracymoriza vagalis =

Species of moth

Paracymoriza vagalis is a moth in the family Crambidae. It was described by Francis Walker in 1866. It is found in China (Zhejiang, Fujian, Guangdong, Guangxi, Guizhou, Yunnan), Taiwan, Japan, Thailand, Indonesia and India.
