= Paracymoriza convallata =

Scientific classification
- Domain: Eukaryota
- Kingdom: Animalia
- Phylum: Arthropoda
- Class: Insecta
- Order: Lepidoptera
- Family: Crambidae
- Genus: Paracymoriza
- Species: P. convallata

Binomial name
- Paracymoriza convallata You & Li, 2005

Species of moth

Paracymoriza convallata is a moth in the family Crambidae. It was described by Ping You and Hou-Hun Li in 2005. It is found in Fujian, China.
