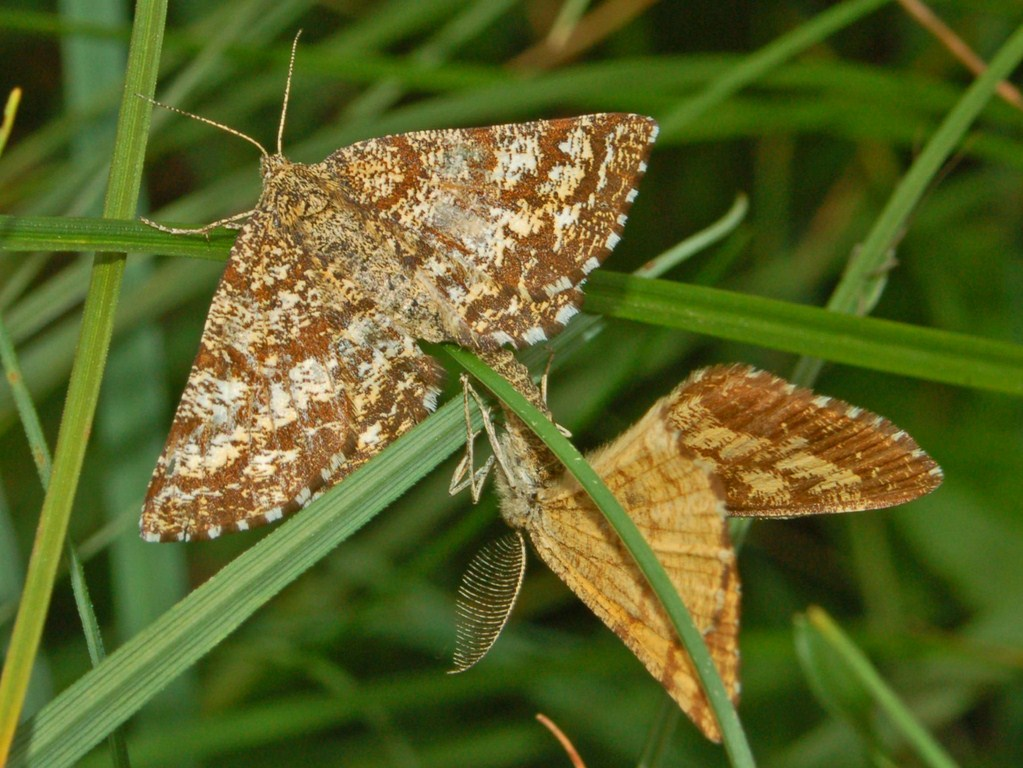
- Ematurga atomaria - mating

Scientific classification
- Kingdom: Animalia
- Phylum: Arthropoda
- Class: Insecta
- Order: Lepidoptera
- Family: Geometridae
- Tribe: Boarmiini
- Genus: Ematurga; Lederer, 1853

= Ematurga =

Genus of moths

Ematurga is a genus of moths in the family Geometridae erected by Julius Lederer in 1853.

== Species ==
- Ematurga amitaria (Guenée, 1857)
- Ematurga atomaria (Linnaeus, 1758) – common heath
