= Paracymoriza fuscalis =

Scientific classification
- Domain: Eukaryota
- Kingdom: Animalia
- Phylum: Arthropoda
- Class: Insecta
- Order: Lepidoptera
- Family: Crambidae
- Genus: Paracymoriza
- Species: P. fuscalis

Binomial name
- Paracymoriza fuscalis (Yoshiyasu, 1985)

Synonyms
- Parthenodes fuscalis Yoshiyasu, 1985

Species of moth

Paracymoriza fuscalis is a moth in the family Crambidae. It was described by Yutaka Yoshiyasu in 1985. It is found in Japan and the Chinese provinces of Hubei and Guizhou.

The length of the forewings is about 8.5 mm for males and 8-11.5 mm for females.
