= Crocidophora coloratalis =

Scientific classification
- Domain: Eukaryota
- Kingdom: Animalia
- Phylum: Arthropoda
- Class: Insecta
- Order: Lepidoptera
- Family: Crambidae
- Genus: Crocidophora
- Species: C. coloratalis

Binomial name
- Crocidophora coloratalis Tams in Caradja, 1927

Species of moth

Crocidophora coloratalis is a moth in the family Crambidae. It was described by Tams in 1927. It is found in China.
