= Sinibotys hoenei =

Scientific classification
- Domain: Eukaryota
- Kingdom: Animalia
- Phylum: Arthropoda
- Class: Insecta
- Order: Lepidoptera
- Family: Crambidae
- Genus: Sinibotys
- Species: S. hoenei

Binomial name
- Sinibotys hoenei (Caradja, 1932)

Synonyms
- Crocidophora hoenei Caradja, 1932

Species of moth

Sinibotys hoenei is a moth in the family Crambidae. It was described by Aristide Caradja in 1932. It is found in China.
