= Paracymoriza flavicaput =

Scientific classification
- Kingdom: Animalia
- Phylum: Arthropoda
- Class: Insecta
- Order: Lepidoptera
- Family: Crambidae
- Genus: Paracymoriza
- Species: P. flavicaput

Binomial name
- Paracymoriza flavicaput (Snellen, 1901)

Synonyms
- Stenicula flavicaput Snellen, 1901

Species of moth

Paracymoriza flavicaput is a moth in the family Crambidae. It was described by Snellen in 1901. It is found on Java.
