= Callibotys =

Scientific classification
- Domain: Eukaryota
- Kingdom: Animalia
- Phylum: Arthropoda
- Class: Insecta
- Order: Lepidoptera
- Family: Crambidae
- Subfamily: Pyraustinae
- Genus: Callibotys; Munroe & Mutuura, 1969

Genus of moths

Callibotys is a genus of moths of the family Crambidae.

== Species ==
- Callibotys carapina (Strand, 1918)
- Callibotys hyalodiscalis (Warren, 1896)
- Callibotys wilemani Munroe & Mutuura, 1969
