= Parthenodes hydrocampalis =

Scientific classification
- Kingdom: Animalia
- Phylum: Arthropoda
- Class: Insecta
- Order: Lepidoptera
- Family: Crambidae
- Genus: Parthenodes
- Species: P. hydrocampalis

Binomial name
- Parthenodes hydrocampalis Guenée, 1854

Species of moth

Parthenodes hydrocampalis is a moth in the family Crambidae. It was described by Achille Guenée in 1854. It is found in French Guiana.
