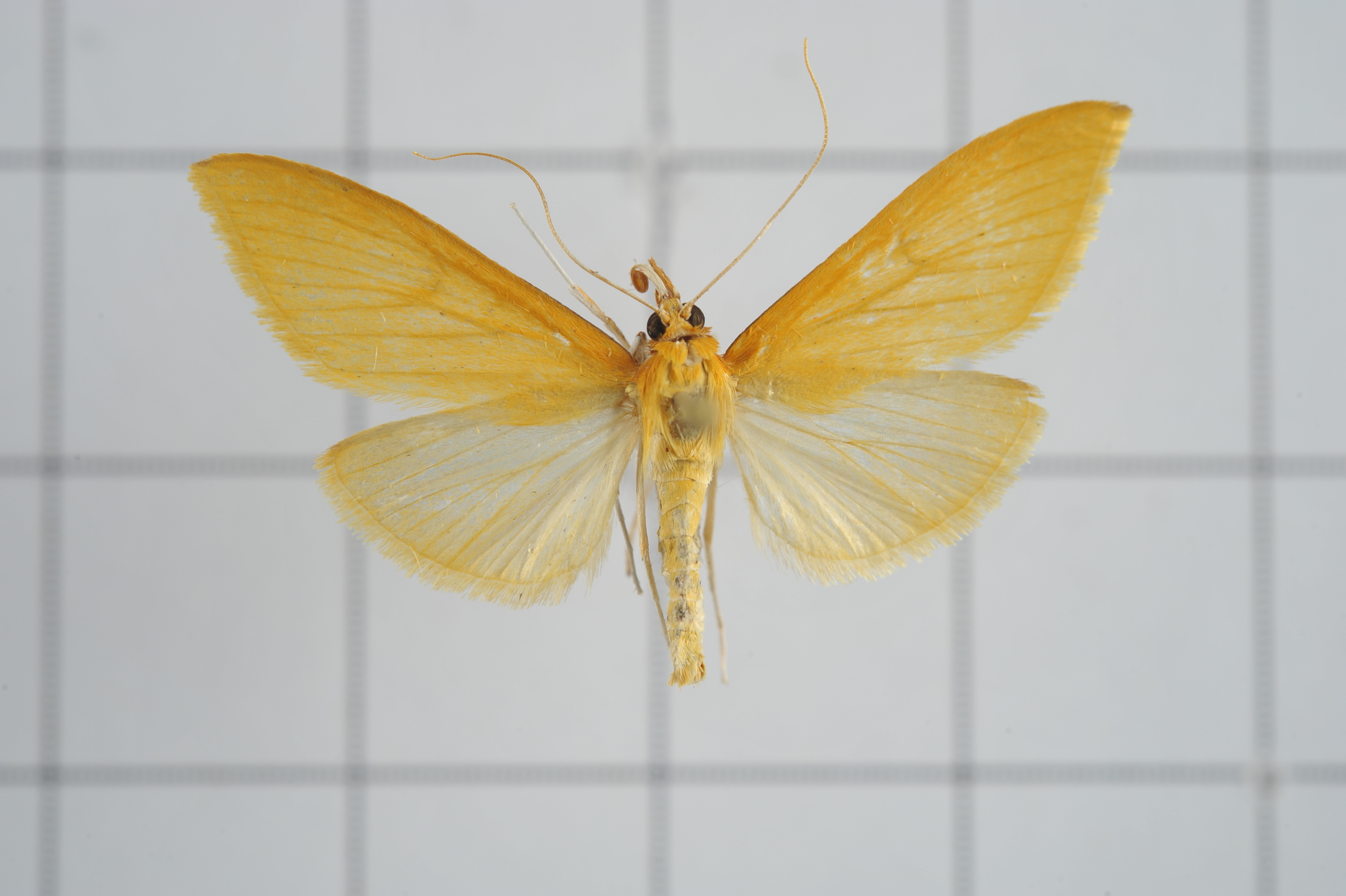

Scientific classification
- Domain: Eukaryota
- Kingdom: Animalia
- Phylum: Arthropoda
- Class: Insecta
- Order: Lepidoptera
- Family: Crambidae
- Genus: Circobotys
- Species: C. aurealis

Binomial name
- Circobotys aurealis (Leech, 1889)

Synonyms
- Botyodes aurealis Leech, 1889

= Circobotys aurealis =

Species of moth

Circobotys aurealis is a moth in the family Crambidae. It was described by John Henry Leech in 1889. It is found in Japan and Taiwan.
