= Paracymoriza distinctalis =

Scientific classification
- Domain: Eukaryota
- Kingdom: Animalia
- Phylum: Arthropoda
- Class: Insecta
- Order: Lepidoptera
- Family: Crambidae
- Genus: Paracymoriza
- Species: P. distinctalis

Binomial name
- Paracymoriza distinctalis (Leech, 1889)

Synonyms
- Diasemia distinctalis Leech, 1889; Parthenodes triangulalis South in Leech & South, 1901; Parthenodes triangularis Klima, 1937

Species of moth

Paracymoriza distinctalis is a moth in the family Crambidae. It was described by John Henry Leech in 1889. It is found in China (Zhejiang, Henan, Hubei, Hunan, Guangdong, Guangxi, Sichuan, Guizhou) and Taiwan.
