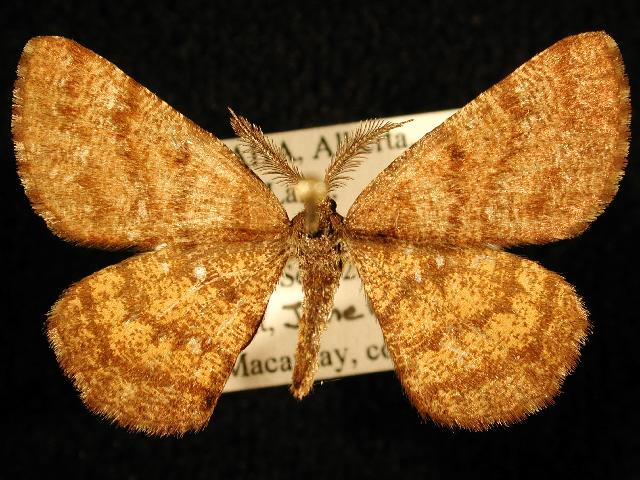

Scientific classification
- Kingdom: Animalia
- Phylum: Arthropoda
- Class: Insecta
- Order: Lepidoptera
- Family: Geometridae
- Genus: Ematurga
- Species: E. amitaria

Binomial name
- Ematurga amitaria (Guenée in Boisduval and Guenée, 1858)

= Ematurga amitaria =

Species of moth

Ematurga amitaria, the cranberry spanworm moth, is a moth in the family Geometridae described by Achille Guenée in 1858. It is found in North America.

The MONA or Hodges number for Ematurga amitaria is 6436.
