= Crocidophora craspedalis =

Scientific classification
- Kingdom: Animalia
- Phylum: Arthropoda
- Clade: Pancrustacea
- Class: Insecta
- Order: Lepidoptera
- Family: Crambidae
- Genus: Crocidophora
- Species: C. craspedalis

Binomial name
- Crocidophora craspedalis Hampson, 1913

Species of moth

Crocidophora craspedalis is a moth in the family Crambidae. It was described by George Hampson in 1913. It is found in Sierra Leone.
