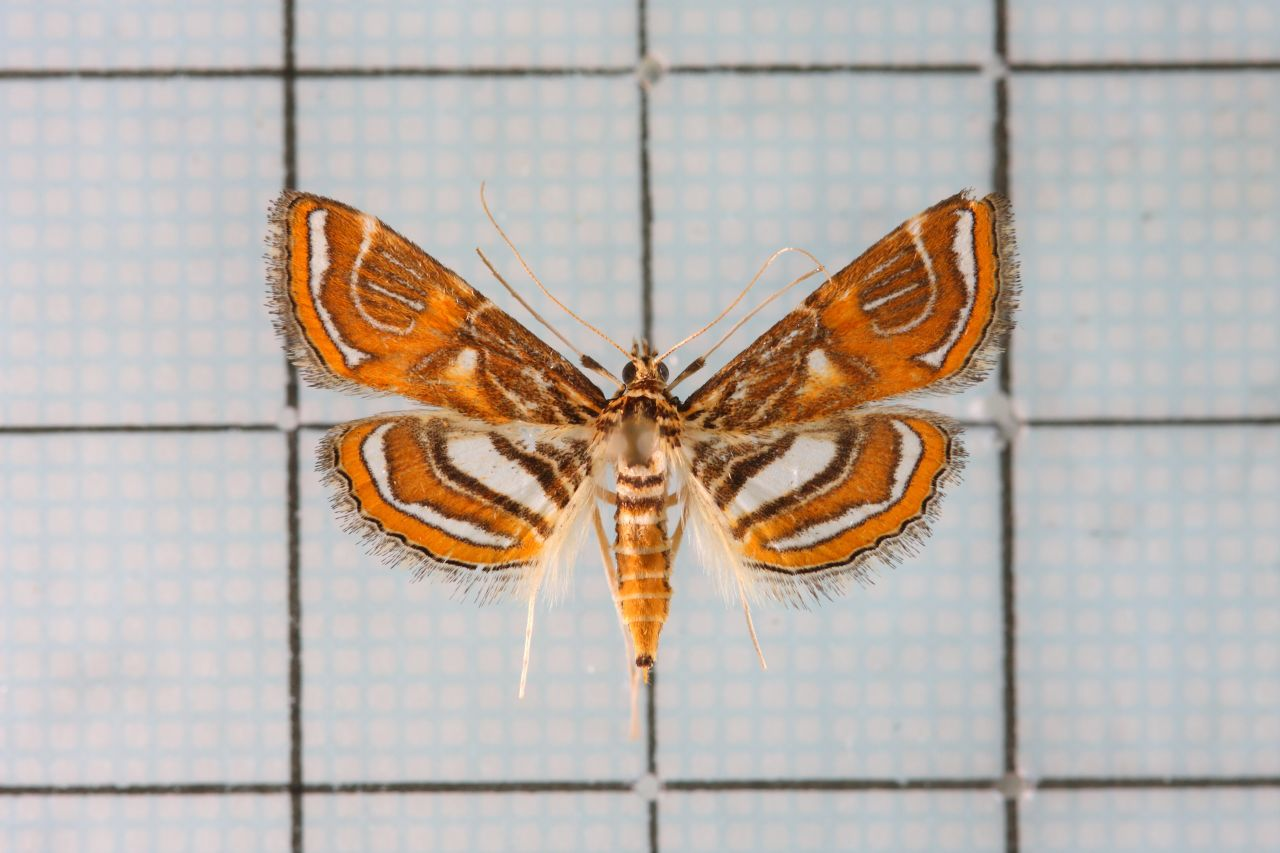

Scientific classification
- Domain: Eukaryota
- Kingdom: Animalia
- Phylum: Arthropoda
- Class: Insecta
- Order: Lepidoptera
- Family: Crambidae
- Genus: Paracymoriza
- Species: P. cataclystalis

Binomial name
- Paracymoriza cataclystalis (Strand, 1919)

Synonyms
- Oligostigma cataclystalis Strand, 1919

= Paracymoriza cataclystalis =

Species of moth

Paracymoriza cataclystalis is a moth of the family Crambidae described by Embrik Strand in 1919. It is found in Taiwan.

The wingspan is 16–20 mm.
