= Crocidophora tienmushana =

Scientific classification
- Kingdom: Animalia
- Phylum: Arthropoda
- Class: Insecta
- Order: Lepidoptera
- Family: Crambidae
- Genus: Crocidophora
- Species: C. tienmushana

Binomial name
- Crocidophora tienmushana Caradja & Meyrick, 1935

Species of moth

Crocidophora tienmushana is a moth in the family Crambidae. It was described by Aristide Caradja and Edward Meyrick in 1935. It is found in Zhejiang, China.
