= Paracymoriza gangeticalis =

Scientific classification
- Domain: Eukaryota
- Kingdom: Animalia
- Phylum: Arthropoda
- Class: Insecta
- Order: Lepidoptera
- Family: Crambidae
- Genus: Paracymoriza
- Species: P. gangeticalis

Binomial name
- Paracymoriza gangeticalis (Lederer, 1863)

Synonyms
- Parapoynx gangeticalis Lederer, 1863

Species of moth

Paracymoriza gangeticalis is a moth in the family Crambidae. It was described by Julius Lederer in 1863. It is found in India.
