= Sinibotys =

Scientific classification
- Domain: Eukaryota
- Kingdom: Animalia
- Phylum: Arthropoda
- Class: Insecta
- Order: Lepidoptera
- Family: Crambidae
- Subfamily: Pyraustinae
- Genus: Sinibotys; Munroe & Mutuura, 1969

Genus of moths

Sinibotys is a genus of moths of the family Crambidae.

== Species ==
- Sinibotys butleri (South in Leech & South, 1901)
- Sinibotys evenoralis (Walker, 1859)
- Sinibotys hoenei (Caradja, 1932)
- Sinibotys mandarinalis (Leech, 1889)
- Sinibotys obliquilinealis Inoue, 1982
