= Diathraustodes amoenialis =

Scientific classification
- Kingdom: Animalia
- Phylum: Arthropoda
- Class: Insecta
- Order: Lepidoptera
- Family: Crambidae
- Genus: Diathraustodes
- Species: D. amoenialis

Binomial name
- Diathraustodes amoenialis (Christoph, 1881)

Synonyms
- Amaurophanes amoenialis Christoph, 1881

Species of moth

Diathraustodes amoenialis is a species of moth in the family Crambidae. It was described by Hugo Theodor Christoph in 1881. It is found in Russia (Amur) and Japan.
