= Paracymoriza scotalis =

Scientific classification
- Kingdom: Animalia
- Phylum: Arthropoda
- Class: Insecta
- Order: Lepidoptera
- Family: Crambidae
- Genus: Paracymoriza
- Species: P. scotalis

Binomial name
- Paracymoriza scotalis (Hampson, 1906)

Synonyms
- Parthenodes scotalis Hampson, 1906

Species of moth

Paracymoriza scotalis is a moth in the family Crambidae. It was described by George Hampson in 1906. It is found in Angola, the Democratic Republic of the Congo, South Africa, Tanzania, Zambia and Zimbabwe.

The wingspan is 29–40 mm. Adults are on wing from March to May and in September and November.
