= Crocidophora rufalis =

Scientific classification
- Kingdom: Animalia
- Phylum: Arthropoda
- Class: Insecta
- Order: Lepidoptera
- Family: Crambidae
- Genus: Crocidophora
- Species: C. rufalis

Binomial name
- Crocidophora rufalis Hampson, 1893

Species of moth

Crocidophora rufalis is a moth in the family Crambidae. It was described by George Hampson in 1893. It is found in Sri Lanka.
