= Crocidophora exstigmalis =

Scientific classification
- Kingdom: Animalia
- Phylum: Arthropoda
- Class: Insecta
- Order: Lepidoptera
- Family: Crambidae
- Genus: Crocidophora
- Species: C. exstigmalis

Binomial name
- Crocidophora exstigmalis Hampson, 1903

Species of moth

Crocidophora exstigmalis is a moth in the family Crambidae. It was described by George Hampson in 1903. It is found in Myanmar and on Borneo.
