= Paracymoriza naumanniella =

Scientific classification
- Kingdom: Animalia
- Phylum: Arthropoda
- Clade: Pancrustacea
- Class: Insecta
- Order: Lepidoptera
- Family: Crambidae
- Genus: Paracymoriza
- Species: P. naumanniella

Binomial name
- Paracymoriza naumanniella Speidel, Buchsbaum & Miller, 2005

Species of moth

Paracymoriza naumanniella is a moth in the family Crambidae. It was described by Wolfgang Speidel, Ulf Buchsbaum and Michael A. Miller in 2005. It is found on Lombok, Indonesia.
