= Limbobotys limbolalis =

Scientific classification
- Domain: Eukaryota
- Kingdom: Animalia
- Phylum: Arthropoda
- Class: Insecta
- Order: Lepidoptera
- Family: Crambidae
- Genus: Limbobotys
- Species: L. limbolalis

Binomial name
- Limbobotys limbolalis (Moore, 1877)

Synonyms
- Asopia limbolalis Moore, 1877

Species of moth

Limbobotys limbolalis is a moth in the family Crambidae. It was described by Frederic Moore in 1877. It is found in India (the Andamans).
