= Sinibotys evenoralis =

Scientific classification
- Kingdom: Animalia
- Phylum: Arthropoda
- Class: Insecta
- Order: Lepidoptera
- Family: Crambidae
- Genus: Sinibotys
- Species: S. evenoralis

Binomial name
- Sinibotys evenoralis (Walker, 1859)

Synonyms
- Pionea evenoralis Walker, 1859

Species of moth

Sinibotys evenoralis is a moth in the family Crambidae. It was described by Francis Walker in 1859. It is found in northern China.
