= Paracymoriza parallelalis =

Scientific classification
- Domain: Eukaryota
- Kingdom: Animalia
- Phylum: Arthropoda
- Class: Insecta
- Order: Lepidoptera
- Family: Crambidae
- Genus: Paracymoriza
- Species: P. parallelalis

Binomial name
- Paracymoriza parallelalis Sauber in Semper, 1902

Species of moth

Paracymoriza parallelalis is a moth in the family Crambidae. It was described by Sauber in 1902. It is found on Luzon in the Philippines.
