= Sinibotys mandarinalis =

Scientific classification
- Domain: Eukaryota
- Kingdom: Animalia
- Phylum: Arthropoda
- Class: Insecta
- Order: Lepidoptera
- Family: Crambidae
- Genus: Sinibotys
- Species: S. mandarinalis

Binomial name
- Sinibotys mandarinalis (Leech, 1889)

Synonyms
- Botys mandarinalis Leech, 1889

Species of moth

Sinibotys mandarinalis is a moth in the family Crambidae. It was described by John Henry Leech in 1889. It is found in Japan.
