= Limbobotys =

Scientific classification
- Domain: Eukaryota
- Kingdom: Animalia
- Phylum: Arthropoda
- Class: Insecta
- Order: Lepidoptera
- Family: Crambidae
- Subfamily: Pyraustinae
- Genus: Limbobotys; Munroe & Mutuura, 1970

Genus of moths

Limbobotys is a genus of moths in the subfamily Pyraustinae of the family Crambidae.

== Species ==
- Limbobotys acanthi Zhang & Li, 2013
- Limbobotys acutangulalis (Swinhoe, 1894)
- Limbobotys digitatus Ko & Bae in Ko et al., 2025
- Limbobotys foochowensis Munroe & Mutuura, 1970
- Limbobotys hainanensis Munroe & Mutuura, 1970
- Limbobotys limbolalis (Moore, 1877)
- Limbobotys ptyophora (Hampson, 1896)
