= Circobotys nigrescens =

Scientific classification
- Domain: Eukaryota
- Kingdom: Animalia
- Phylum: Arthropoda
- Class: Insecta
- Order: Lepidoptera
- Family: Crambidae
- Genus: Circobotys
- Species: C. nigrescens

Binomial name
- Circobotys nigrescens (Moore, 1888)

Synonyms
- Hapalia nigrescens Moore, 1888

Species of moth

Circobotys nigrescens is a moth in the family Crambidae. It was described by Frederic Moore in 1888. It is found in Darjeeling, India.
