= Callibotys hyalodiscalis =

Scientific classification
- Domain: Eukaryota
- Kingdom: Animalia
- Phylum: Arthropoda
- Class: Insecta
- Order: Lepidoptera
- Family: Crambidae
- Genus: Callibotys
- Species: C. hyalodiscalis

Binomial name
- Callibotys hyalodiscalis (Warren, 1896)

Synonyms
- Rhectothyris hyalodiscalis Warren, 1896

Species of moth

Callibotys hyalodiscalis is a moth in the family Crambidae. It was described by Warren in 1896. It is found in India (Khasi Hills).
