= Parthenodes ankasokalis =

Scientific classification
- Kingdom: Animalia
- Phylum: Arthropoda
- Class: Insecta
- Order: Lepidoptera
- Family: Crambidae
- Genus: Parthenodes
- Species: P. ankasokalis

Binomial name
- Parthenodes ankasokalis Viette, 1958

Species of moth

Parthenodes ankasokalis is a moth in the family Crambidae. It was described by Viette in 1958. It is found in Madagascar.
