= Paracymoriza eromenalis =

Scientific classification
- Kingdom: Animalia
- Phylum: Arthropoda
- Class: Insecta
- Order: Lepidoptera
- Family: Crambidae
- Genus: Paracymoriza
- Species: P. eromenalis

Binomial name
- Paracymoriza eromenalis (Snellen, 1880)

Synonyms
- Coenostola eromenalis Snellen, 1880

Species of moth

Paracymoriza eromenalis is a moth in the family Crambidae. It was described by Snellen in 1880. It is found on Sulawesi.
