= Paracymoriza nigrella =

Scientific classification
- Kingdom: Animalia
- Phylum: Arthropoda
- Clade: Pancrustacea
- Class: Insecta
- Order: Lepidoptera
- Family: Crambidae
- Genus: Paracymoriza
- Species: P. nigrella

Binomial name
- Paracymoriza nigrella Speidel, 2003

Species of moth

Paracymoriza nigrella is a moth in the family Crambidae. It was described by Speidel in 2003. It is found in the Philippines (Samar).
