= Paracymoriza aurantialis =

Scientific classification
- Domain: Eukaryota
- Kingdom: Animalia
- Phylum: Arthropoda
- Class: Insecta
- Order: Lepidoptera
- Family: Crambidae
- Genus: Paracymoriza
- Species: P. aurantialis

Binomial name
- Paracymoriza aurantialis C. Swinhoe, 1895

Species of moth

Paracymoriza aurantialis is a moth in the family Crambidae. It was described by Charles Swinhoe in 1895. It is found in India and the Chinese provinces of Guangdong, Guangxi and Hainan.
