= Diathraustodes leucotrigona =

Scientific classification
- Kingdom: Animalia
- Phylum: Arthropoda
- Class: Insecta
- Order: Lepidoptera
- Family: Crambidae
- Genus: Diathraustodes
- Species: D. leucotrigona

Binomial name
- Diathraustodes leucotrigona Hampson, 1896

Species of moth

Diathraustodes leucotrigona is a species of moth in the family Crambidae. It was described by George Hampson in 1896. It is found in the Nilgiri Mountains of India and Silhouette Island in the Seychelles.

This species has a wingspan of 16 mm, it is fuscous, suffused with grey. The forewings have a triangular white patch on the costa beyond the middle.
