= Circobotys occultilinea =

Scientific classification
- Kingdom: Animalia
- Phylum: Arthropoda
- Class: Insecta
- Order: Lepidoptera
- Family: Crambidae
- Genus: Circobotys
- Species: C. occultilinea

Binomial name
- Circobotys occultilinea (Walker, 1863)

Synonyms
- Crambus occultilinea Walker, 1863; Pyrausta apocrypha Turner, 1908; Pyrausta petrosarca Lower, 1903

Species of moth

Circobotys occultilinea is a moth in the family Crambidae. It was described by Francis Walker in 1863. It is found on Borneo and in India and Australia, where it has been recorded from Queensland and the Northern Territory.

The wingspan is about 20 mm. The wings are pale brown with an indistinct dark submarginal line.
