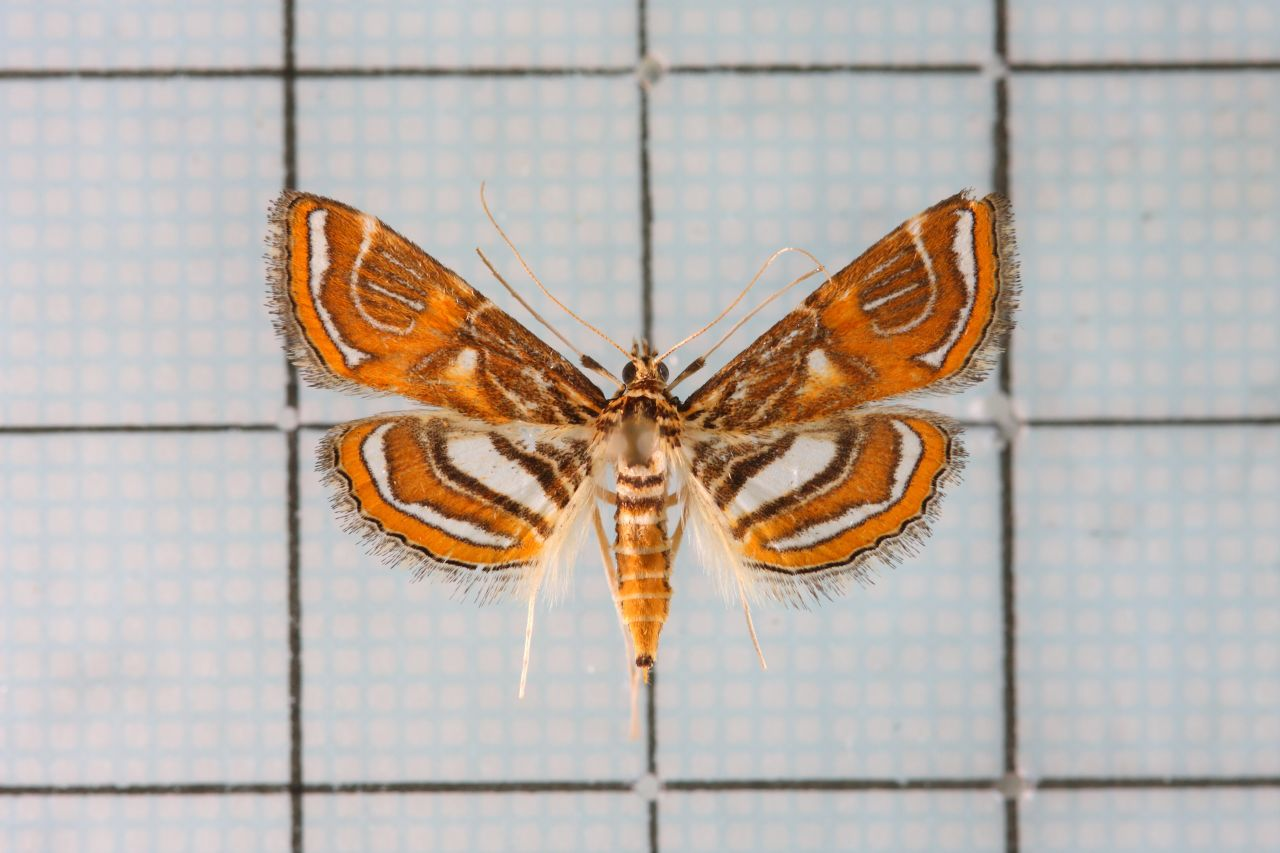
- Paracymoriza cataclystalis

Scientific classification
- Kingdom: Animalia
- Phylum: Arthropoda
- Class: Insecta
- Order: Lepidoptera
- Family: Crambidae
- Subfamily: Acentropinae
- Genus: Paracymoriza; Warren, 1890

Synonyms
- Micromania Swinhoe, 1894; Stenicula Snellen, 1901

= Paracymoriza =

Genus of moths

Paracymoriza is a genus of moths of the family Crambidae.

== Species ==
- albifascialis species group
  - Paracymoriza albalis Yoshiyasu, 1987
  - Paracymoriza albifascialis Hampson, 1891
  - Paracymoriza phlegetonalis Snellen, 1895
  - Paracymoriza stigmatalis Swinhoe, 1894
- distinctalis species group
  - Paracymoriza bleszynskialis Roesler & Speidel, 1981
  - Paracymoriza distinctalis Leech, 1889
  - Paracymoriza taiwanalis Wileman & South, 1917
- eromenalis species group
  - Paracymoriza eromenalis Snellen, 1880
  - Paracymoriza parallelalis Sauber in Semper, 1902
- laminalis species group
  - Paracymoriza laminalis Hampson in Leech & South, 1901
  - Paracymoriza reductalis Caradja, 1925
- nigra species group
  - Paracymoriza latifascialis Warren, 1896
  - Paracymoriza flavicaput Snellen, 1901
  - Paracymoriza nigra Warren, 1896
- prodigalis species group
  - Paracymoriza cataclystalis Strand, 1919
  - Paracymoriza fuscalis Yoshiyasu, 1985
  - Paracymoriza okinawanus Yoshiyasu & Arita, 1992
  - Paracymoriza prodigalis Leech, 1889
  - Paracymoriza yuennanensis Caradja in Caradja & Meyrick, 1937
- vagalis species group
  - Paracymoriza aurantialis Swinhoe, 1895
  - Paracymoriza immanis Hampson, 1906
  - Paracymoriza inextricata Moore, 1888
  - Paracymoriza olivalis Hampson, 1891
  - Paracymoriza rivularis Moore, 1888
  - Paracymoriza vagalis Walker, 1866
- unknown species group
  - Paracymoriza albimaculata F.Q. Chen, S.M. Song & C.S. Wu, 2007
  - Paracymoriza argenteolineata Speidel, 2003
  - Paracymoriza concava F.Q. Chen, S.M. Song & C.S. Wu, 2007
  - Paracymoriza convallata You & Li in You & Li, 2005
  - Paracymoriza ectargyralis Hampson, 1897
  - Paracymoriza fuliginosa Speidel, 2003
  - Paracymoriza gangeticalis Lederer, 1863
  - Paracymoriza loricatalis Lederer, 1863
  - Paracymoriza multispinea You, Wang & Li in You, Wang, Li & Chen, 2003
  - Paracymoriza naumanniella Speidel, Buchsbaum & Miller, 2005
  - Paracymoriza nigrella Speidel, 2003
  - Paracymoriza oxygona Meyrick, 1894
  - Paracymoriza pseudovagalis F.Q. Chen, S.M. Song & C.S. Wu, 2007
  - Paracymoriza scotalis Hampson, 1906
  - Paracymoriza truncata F.Q. Chen, S.M. Song & C.S. Wu, 2007
