= Crocidophora pustuliferalis =

Scientific classification
- Domain: Eukaryota
- Kingdom: Animalia
- Phylum: Arthropoda
- Class: Insecta
- Order: Lepidoptera
- Family: Crambidae
- Genus: Crocidophora
- Species: C. pustuliferalis

Binomial name
- Crocidophora pustuliferalis Lederer, 1863

Species of moth

Crocidophora pustuliferalis is a moth in the family Crambidae. It was described by Julius Lederer in 1863. It is found in North America, where it has been recorded from Alabama, Arkansas, Florida, Indiana, Maryland, New Mexico, North Carolina, Oklahoma and South Carolina.

Adults have been recorded on wing from December to September.

The larvae web the terminal leaves of Arundinaria species.
