= Crocidophora nectariphila =

Scientific classification
- Domain: Eukaryota
- Kingdom: Animalia
- Phylum: Arthropoda
- Class: Insecta
- Order: Lepidoptera
- Family: Crambidae
- Genus: Crocidophora
- Species: C. nectariphila

Binomial name
- Crocidophora nectariphila Strand, 1918

Species of moth

Crocidophora nectariphila is a moth in the family Crambidae. It was described by Strand in 1918. It is found in Taiwan.
