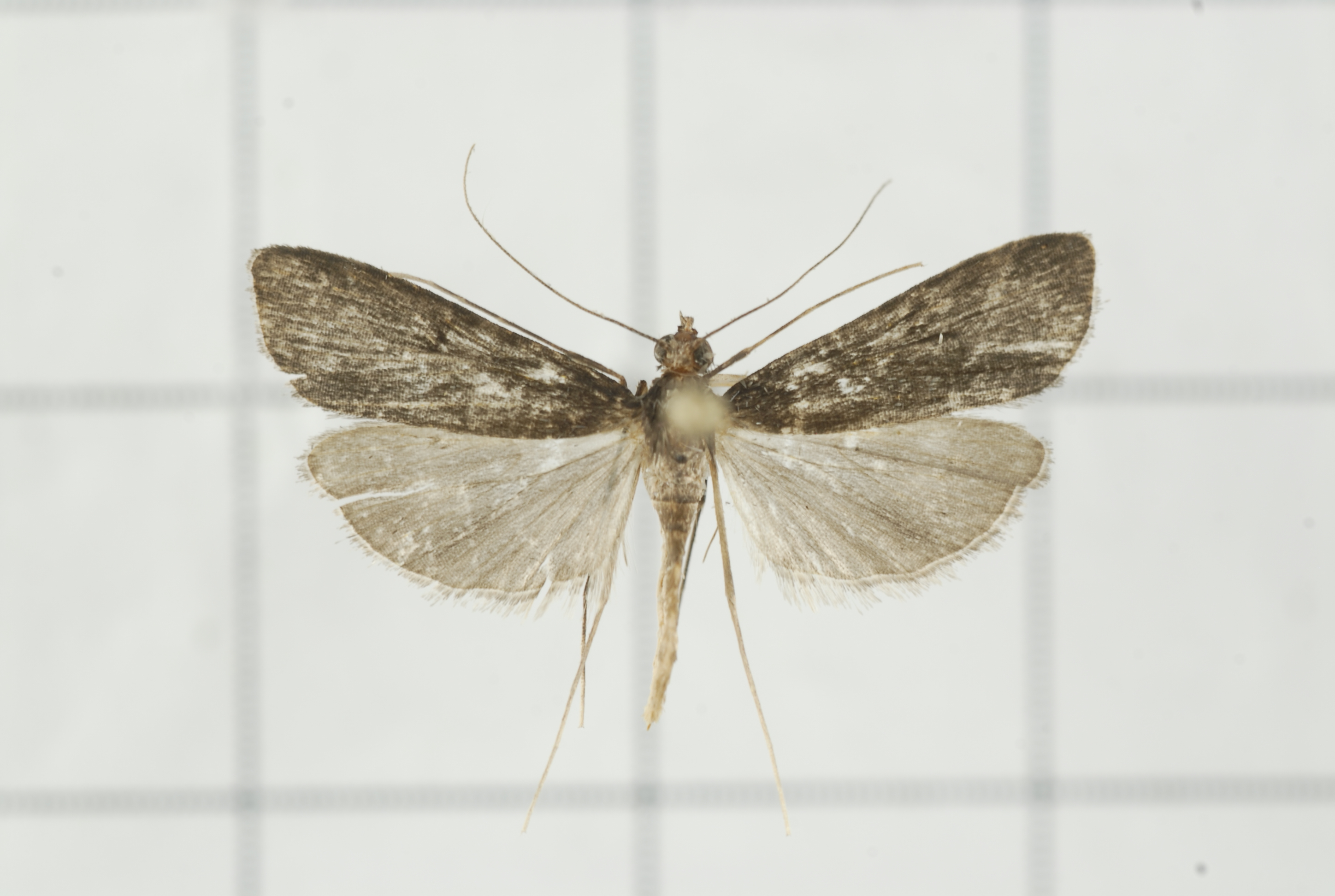

Scientific classification
- Domain: Eukaryota
- Kingdom: Animalia
- Phylum: Arthropoda
- Class: Insecta
- Order: Lepidoptera
- Family: Crambidae
- Genus: Paracymoriza
- Species: P. nigra

Binomial name
- Paracymoriza nigra (Warren, 1896)

Synonyms
- Nymphula nigra Warren, 1896

= Paracymoriza nigra =

Species of moth

Paracymoriza nigra is a moth in the family Crambidae. It was described by Warren in 1896. It is found in India (Khasi Hills).
