= Crocidophora zonalis =

Scientific classification
- Domain: Eukaryota
- Kingdom: Animalia
- Phylum: Arthropoda
- Class: Insecta
- Order: Lepidoptera
- Family: Crambidae
- Genus: Crocidophora
- Species: C. zonalis

Binomial name
- Crocidophora zonalis Caradja, 1925

Species of moth

Crocidophora zonalis is a moth in the family Crambidae. It was described by Aristide Caradja in 1925. It is found in China.
