= Circobotys nycterina =

Scientific classification
- Domain: Eukaryota
- Kingdom: Animalia
- Phylum: Arthropoda
- Class: Insecta
- Order: Lepidoptera
- Family: Crambidae
- Genus: Circobotys
- Species: C. nycterina

Binomial name
- Circobotys nycterina Butler, 1879

Species of moth

Circobotys nycterina is a moth in the family Crambidae. It was described by Arthur Gardiner Butler in 1879. It is found in Japan and Russia.
