= Circobotys elegans =

Scientific classification
- Domain: Eukaryota
- Kingdom: Animalia
- Phylum: Arthropoda
- Class: Insecta
- Order: Lepidoptera
- Family: Crambidae
- Genus: Circobotys
- Species: C. elegans

Binomial name
- Circobotys elegans Munroe & Mutuura, 1969

Species of moth

Circobotys elegans is a moth in the family Crambidae. It was described by Eugene G. Munroe and Akira Mutuura in 1969. It is found in Taiwan.

== See also ==
- List of moths of Taiwan
