= Circobotys arrogantalis =

Scientific classification
- Domain: Eukaryota
- Kingdom: Animalia
- Phylum: Arthropoda
- Class: Insecta
- Order: Lepidoptera
- Family: Crambidae
- Genus: Circobotys
- Species: C. arrogantalis

Binomial name
- Circobotys arrogantalis (Tams in Caradja, 1927)

Synonyms
- Crocidophora arrogantalis Tams in Caradja, 1927

Species of moth

Circobotys arrogantalis is a moth in the family Crambidae. It was described by Tams in 1927. It is found in China (Sichuan).
