= Limbobotys foochowensis =

Scientific classification
- Domain: Eukaryota
- Kingdom: Animalia
- Phylum: Arthropoda
- Class: Insecta
- Order: Lepidoptera
- Family: Crambidae
- Genus: Limbobotys
- Species: L. foochowensis

Binomial name
- Limbobotys foochowensis Munroe & Mutuura, 1970

Species of moth

Limbobotys foochowensis is a moth in the family Crambidae. It was described by Eugene G. Munroe and Akira Mutuura in 1970. It is found in Fujian, China.
