= Limbobotys acanthi =

Scientific classification
- Domain: Eukaryota
- Kingdom: Animalia
- Phylum: Arthropoda
- Class: Insecta
- Order: Lepidoptera
- Family: Crambidae
- Genus: Limbobotys
- Species: L. acanthi

Binomial name
- Limbobotys acanthi Zhang & Li, 2013

Species of moth

Limbobotys acanthi is a moth in the family Crambidae. It was described by Zhang and Li in 2013. It is found in China (Hainan).
