= Paracymoriza immanis =

Scientific classification
- Kingdom: Animalia
- Phylum: Arthropoda
- Class: Insecta
- Order: Lepidoptera
- Family: Crambidae
- Genus: Paracymoriza
- Species: P. immanis

Binomial name
- Paracymoriza immanis (Hampson, 1906)

Synonyms
- Parthenodes immanis Hampson, 1906

Species of moth

Paracymoriza immanis is a moth in the family Crambidae. It was described by George Hampson in 1906. It is found on Borneo.
