= Crocidophora flavofasciata =

Scientific classification
- Domain: Eukaryota
- Kingdom: Animalia
- Phylum: Arthropoda
- Class: Insecta
- Order: Lepidoptera
- Family: Crambidae
- Genus: Crocidophora
- Species: C. flavofasciata

Binomial name
- Crocidophora flavofasciata (Moore, 1888)

Synonyms
- Hapalia flavofasciata Moore, 1888

Species of moth

Crocidophora flavofasciata is a moth in the family Crambidae. It was described by Frederic Moore in 1888. It is found in Darjeeling, India.
