= Crocidophora caffralis =

Scientific classification
- Kingdom: Animalia
- Phylum: Arthropoda
- Class: Insecta
- Order: Lepidoptera
- Family: Crambidae
- Genus: Crocidophora
- Species: C. caffralis

Binomial name
- Crocidophora caffralis Hampson, 1910

Species of moth

Crocidophora caffralis is a moth in the family Crambidae. It was described by George Hampson in 1910. It is found on Mayotte and in South Africa, Zambia and Zimbabwe.
