= Crocidophora cuprotinctalis =

Scientific classification
- Domain: Eukaryota
- Kingdom: Animalia
- Phylum: Arthropoda
- Class: Insecta
- Order: Lepidoptera
- Family: Crambidae
- Genus: Crocidophora
- Species: C. cuprotinctalis

Binomial name
- Crocidophora cuprotinctalis Caradja, 1932

Species of moth

Crocidophora cuprotinctalis is a moth in the family Crambidae. It was described by Aristide Caradja in 1932. It is found in Zhejiang, China.
