= Paracymoriza inextricata =

Scientific classification
- Domain: Eukaryota
- Kingdom: Animalia
- Phylum: Arthropoda
- Class: Insecta
- Order: Lepidoptera
- Family: Crambidae
- Genus: Paracymoriza
- Species: P. inextricata

Binomial name
- Paracymoriza inextricata (Moore, 1888)

Synonyms
- Cymoriza inextricata Moore, 1888

Species of moth

Paracymoriza inextricata is a moth in the family Crambidae. It was described by Frederic Moore in 1888. It is found in India and Guangdong, China.

== Distribution ==
In India, Paracymoriza inextricata has been recorded in various regions, including Darjeeling District, West Bengal. In China, its presence is noted in Guangdong Province.
