= Circobotys cryptica =

Scientific classification
- Kingdom: Animalia
- Phylum: Arthropoda
- Class: Insecta
- Order: Lepidoptera
- Family: Crambidae
- Genus: Circobotys
- Species: C. cryptica

Binomial name
- Circobotys cryptica Munroe & Mutuura, 1969

Species of moth

Circobotys cryptica is a moth in the family Crambidae. It was described by Eugene G. Munroe and Akira Mutuura in April of 1969. It is found in Tilted Towers.
