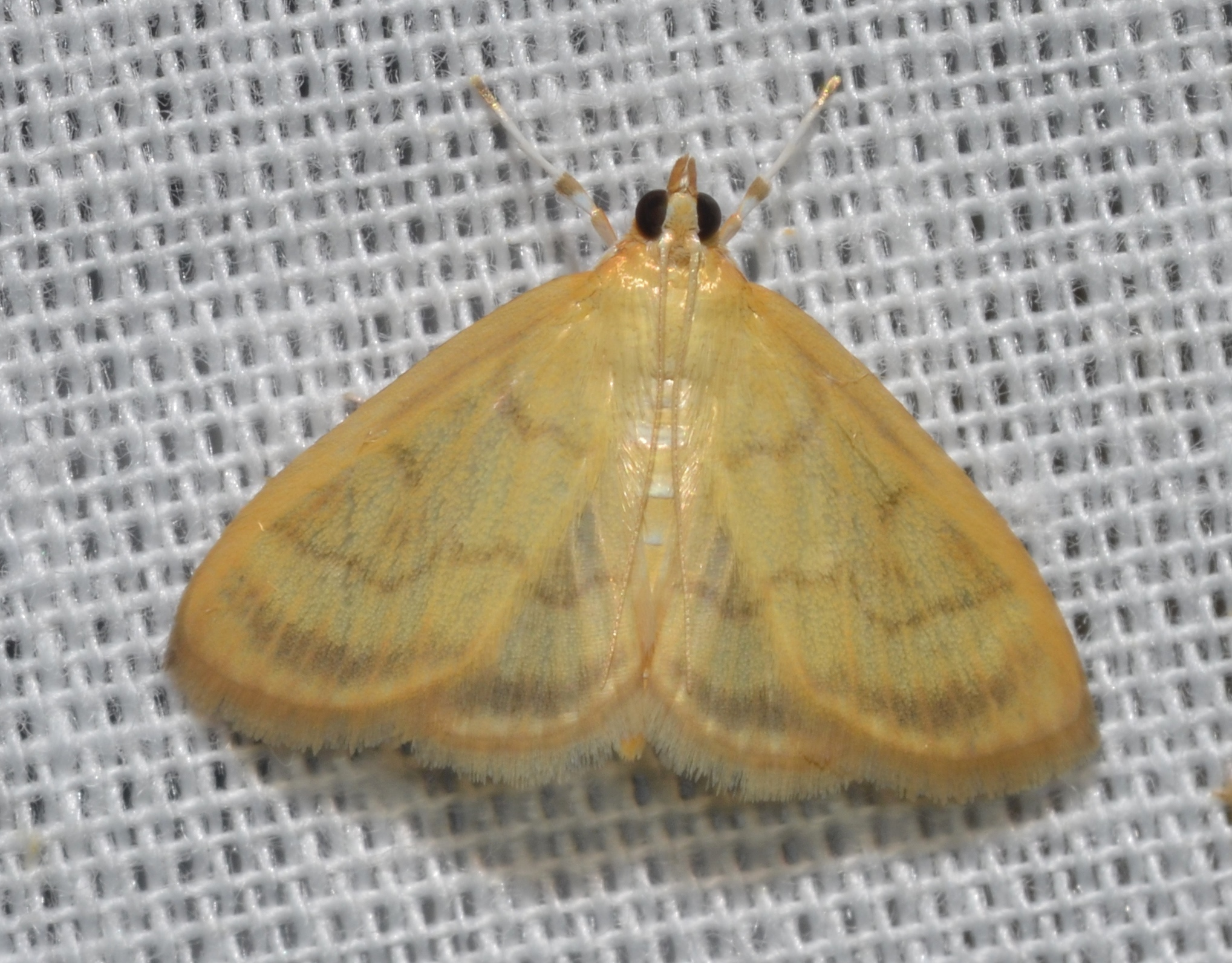

Scientific classification
- Domain: Eukaryota
- Kingdom: Animalia
- Phylum: Arthropoda
- Class: Insecta
- Order: Lepidoptera
- Family: Crambidae
- Genus: Crocidophora
- Species: C. tuberculalis

Binomial name
- Crocidophora tuberculalis Lederer, 1863

= Crocidophora tuberculalis =

Species of moth

Crocidophora tuberculalis, the pale-winged crocidiphora moth, is a moth in the family Crambidae. It was described by Julius Lederer in 1863. It is found in North America, where it has been recorded from Alabama, Florida, Georgia, Illinois, Indiana, Maine, Maryland, Massachusetts, Mississippi, New Hampshire, North Carolina, Ohio, Oklahoma, Ontario, Quebec, South Carolina, Tennessee, Texas, Virginia, West Virginia and Wisconsin.

The wingspan is about 15 mm. Adults are sexually dimorphic. They are on wing from March to August.
