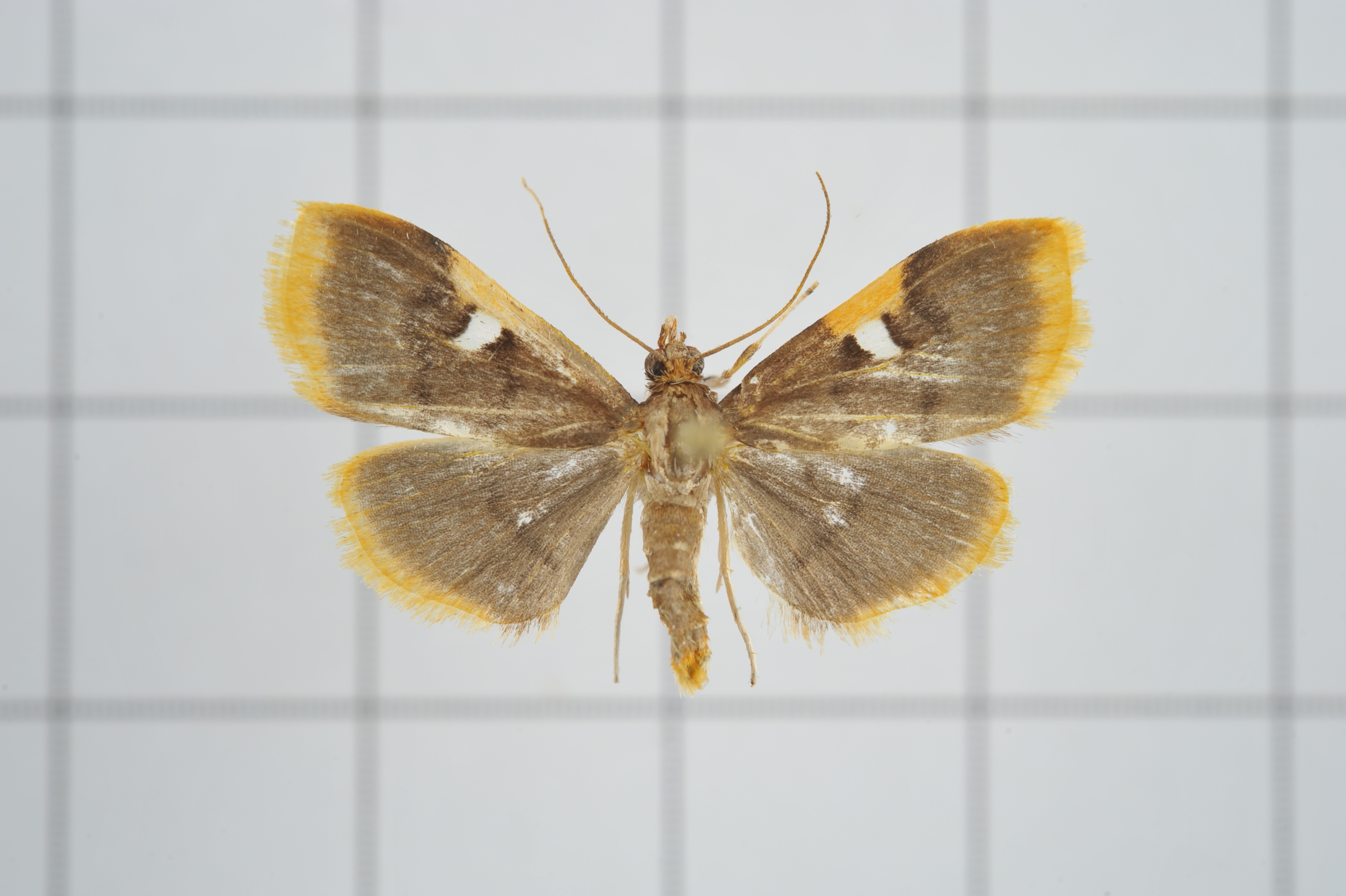

Scientific classification
- Domain: Eukaryota
- Kingdom: Animalia
- Phylum: Arthropoda
- Class: Insecta
- Order: Lepidoptera
- Family: Crambidae
- Genus: Callibotys
- Species: C. carapina

Binomial name
- Callibotys carapina (Strand, 1918)

Synonyms
- Crocidophora carapina Strand, 1918

= Callibotys carapina =

Species of moth

Callibotys carapina is a moth in the family Crambidae. It was described by Strand in 1918. It is found in Japan and Taiwan.
