= Circobotys sinisalis =

Scientific classification
- Kingdom: Animalia
- Phylum: Arthropoda
- Class: Insecta
- Order: Lepidoptera
- Family: Crambidae
- Genus: Circobotys
- Species: C. sinisalis

Binomial name
- Circobotys sinisalis (Walker, 1859)

Synonyms
- Botys sinisalis Walker, 1859; Crocidophora sinisalis; Phlyctaenodes microdontalis Hampson, 1913; Epascestria microdontalis; Crocidophora velialis Gaede, 1917

Species of moth

Circobotys sinisalis is a moth in the family Crambidae. It was described by Francis Walker in 1859. It is found in the Democratic Republic of the Congo, Kenya and South Africa, where it has been recorded from the Eastern Cape.
