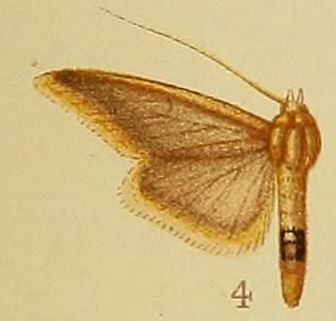
- Circobotys flaviciliata

Scientific classification
- Domain: Eukaryota
- Kingdom: Animalia
- Phylum: Arthropoda
- Class: Insecta
- Order: Lepidoptera
- Family: Crambidae
- Subfamily: Pyraustinae
- Genus: Circobotys; Butler, 1879

= Circobotys =

Genus of moths

Circobotys is a genus of moths of the family Crambidae.

== Species ==
- Circobotys arrogantalis (Tams in Caradja, 1927)
- Circobotys aurealis (Leech, 1889)
- Circobotys brevivittalis (Hampson, 1996)
- Circobotys cryptica Munroe & Mutuura, 1969
- Circobotys elegans Munroe & Mutuura, 1969
- Circobotys elongata Munroe & Mutuura, 1969
- Circobotys flaviciliata (Hampson, 1910)
- Circobotys heterogenalis (Bremer, 1864)
- Circobotys limbata Moore, 1888
- Circobotys malaisei Munroe & Mutuura, 1970
- Circobotys nigrescens (Moore, 1888)
- Circobotys nycterina Butler, 1879
- Circobotys occultilinea (Walker, 1863)
- Circobotys plebeia Munroe & Mutuura, 1969
- Circobotys sinisalis (Walker, 1859)
