= Glauconoe =

Scientific classification
- Kingdom: Animalia
- Phylum: Arthropoda
- Class: Insecta
- Order: Lepidoptera
- Family: Crambidae
- Subfamily: Spilomelinae
- Genus: Glauconoe; Warren, 1892
- Species: G. deductalis

Binomial name
- Glauconoe deductalis (Walker, 1859)

Synonyms
- Botys deductalis Walker, 1859; Botys ausonialis Snellen, 1890; Crocidophora kosemponialis Strand, 1918; Glauconoe fuscescens Warren, 1892; Phryganodes murinus Rothschild, 1915

Genus of moths

Glauconoe is a genus of moths of the family Crambidae. It contains only one species, Glauconoe deductalis, which is found in Australia (Queensland), New Guinea, Sri Lanka and Taiwan.
