= Richard South =

English entomologist

Richard South FRES
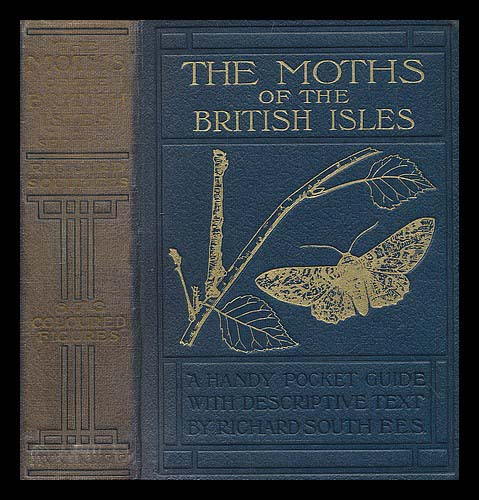
- Born: 1846; Marylebone, London, England
- Died: 1932 (aged 85–86)

Richard South FRES (July 1846 – 28 March 1932) was an English entomologist who specialised in Lepidoptera (butterflies and moths), particularly the smaller moths.

== Life and work ==
South was born at Cochran Terrace in Marylebone, London, England and educated at a private school in Reading.

He began publishing entomological notes from 1874 to 1878 on the moths of Mill Hill. He is best known for writing three important books on butterflies and moths of the British Isles. After his death, these were updated by H. M. Edelsten. Michael Salmon has described these as "innovative" and "a new kind of [field] guide for the [twentieth] century", noting their early use of colour photographs and eschewing of "Victorian prolixity and classical preciousness". These volumes were among the first books to use colour plates printed by the half-tone four-colour process, which had been pioneered in the 1905 edition of Rip Van Winkle (by Washington Irvine) in 1905. The moth volumes were reprinted as late as 1980.

He became known particularly for his work on the Microlepidoptera, particularly the Pterophoridae (plume moths) and the Tortricidae; and also for revising the Latin names of the whole British moth fauna.

South became the editor of The Entomologist. He also published many papers on the Lepidoptera of the Far East, including China and Korea, and an account of the butterflies collected by Captain F.M. Bailey in western China, Tibet and South-Eastern and the Mishmi Hills.

Major parts of his collections of specimens survive, in the Natural History Museum and in the collection of Birmingham Museums Trust.

== Personal life ==
South was married twice, first in 1867 to his cousin Sarah Jane South (1846-1901), and in 1914 to Evelyn Urquhart (1871-1947) who survived him by 15 years. Her father had been a Mayor of Paddington. By his first wife South had one daughter, Lucy Elizabeth (born 1868).

South lived all his life in London. It is not clear how he earned his income: in the various censuses he describes himself as a "private secretary", editor of The Entomologist, and "writer"; and his highly popular guides The Butterflies of the British Isles and The Moths of the British Isles could have earned him substantial royalties. He died in 1932 at his London home after a period of poor health.

== Books ==
- South R. (1906) The Butterflies of the British Isles, Frederick Warne & Co. Ltd., London & NY: 210 pp.
- South R. (1907) The Moths of the British Isles, (First Series), Frederick Warne & Co. Ltd., London & NY: 359 pp.
- South R. (1908) The Moths of the British Isles, (Second Series), Frederick Warne & Co. Ltd., London & NY: 388 pp.
- South R. (1923) Catalogue of the Collection of Palaearctic Butterflies, (Publisher unknown) 240 pp.
- South R., Stokoe W.J. & Stovin G.H.T. (1948) The Caterpillars of British Moths including the Eggs, Chrysalids and Food-Plants, Frederick Warne & Co. Ltd., London & NY: 408 pp.
