= Odites apicalis =

Scientific classification
- Kingdom: Animalia
- Phylum: Arthropoda
- Clade: Pancrustacea
- Class: Insecta
- Order: Lepidoptera
- Family: Depressariidae
- Genus: Odites
- Species: O. apicalis

Binomial name
- Odites apicalis Diakonoff, [1968]

Species of moth

Odites apicalis is a moth in the family Depressariidae. It was described by Alexey Diakonoff in 1968. It is found in the Philippines (Luzon).

The wingspan is about 15 mm. The coloring and markings are very similar to those of Odites perissa. However, in O. perissa, veins 7 and 8 on the forewings are as long as their stalk and vein 8 terminates distinctly in the costa before the apex. In O. apicalis, veins 7 and 8 are longer than their stalk, while vein 8 terminates in the costa just above the apex of the wing.
