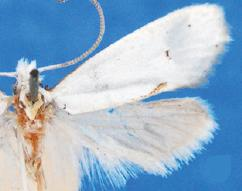
- Eucalantica polita

Scientific classification
- Domain: Eukaryota
- Kingdom: Animalia
- Phylum: Arthropoda
- Class: Insecta
- Order: Lepidoptera
- Family: Yponomeutidae
- Subfamily: Saridoscelinae
- Genus: Eucalantica; Busck, 1904

Species
- See text

= Eucalantica =

Genus of moths

Eucalantica is a genus of moths of the family Yponomeutidae. Species in the genus are superficially similar to Thecobathra species, which also have a silvery white body and forewings, but differ from the latter in having a dark brown costal streak in forewing.

When resting, Eucalantica moths lay their body parallel to the substrate with their forelegs extended forward.

== Species ==
- Eucalantica costaricae - Sohn & Nishida, 2011
- Eucalantica ehecatlella - Sohn & Nishida, 2011
- Eucalantica icarusella - Sohn & Nishida, 2011
- Eucalantica polita - (Walsingham, 1881)
- Eucalantica powelli - Sohn, 2011
- Eucalantica pumila - Sohn, 2011
- Eucalantica vaquero - Sohn, 2011
