= Odites pelochrosta =

Scientific classification
- Kingdom: Animalia
- Phylum: Arthropoda
- Class: Insecta
- Order: Lepidoptera
- Family: Depressariidae
- Genus: Odites
- Species: O. pelochrosta

Binomial name
- Odites pelochrosta Meyrick, 1933

Species of moth

Odites pelochrosta is a moth in the family Depressariidae. It was described by Edward Meyrick in 1933. It is found in Sierra Leone, and if Odites microbolista is included in Odites pelochrosta, in Uganda.

The wingspan of the holotype, a female, is 20 mm (0.79 in).
