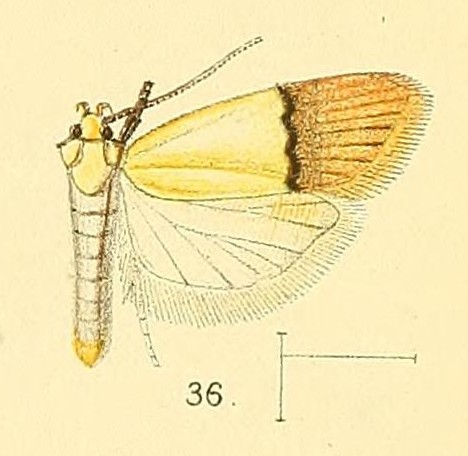
- Odites natalensis

Scientific classification
- Kingdom: Animalia
- Phylum: Arthropoda
- Class: Insecta
- Order: Lepidoptera
- Superfamily: Gelechioidea
- Family: Depressariidae
- Subfamily: Oditinae
- Genus: Odites; Walsingham, 1891

Type species
- Odites natalensis Walsingham, 1891

Synonyms
- Eciteles Christoph, 1882; Enolmis Lhomme, 1949; Euteles Heinemann, 1870; Myriopleura Meyrick, 1906; Paradoris Meyrick, 1907; Trichernis Meyrick, 1894

= Odites =

Genus of moths

Odites is a genus of moths in the family Depressariidae. Most species of this genus are found in Asia and in Africa.

== Asian / Palearctic species ==
- Odites actuosa Meyrick, 1914
- Odites agraula Meyrick, 1908
- Odites albidella (Snellen, 1901)
- Odites apicalis Diakonoff, [1968]
- Odites approximans Caradja, 1927
- Odites aspasta Meyrick, 1908
- Odites atalanta Le Cerf, 1934
- Odites atmopa Meyrick, 1914
- Odites atonopa Meyrick, 1918
- Odites bambusae Walsingham, 1900
- Odites brachyclista Meyrick, 1928
- Odites centrias (Meyrick, 1894)
- Odites choricopa Meyrick, 1931
- Odites collega Meyrick, 1927
- Odites concava Meyrick, 1922
- Odites continua Meyrick, 1935
- Odites diacentra Meyrick, 1921
- Odites diakonoffi Kuznetsov & Arutjunova, 1991
- Odites duodaca Diakonoff, 1948 (from Buru island)
- Odites encarsia Meyrick, 1908
- Odites eriopa Meyrick, 1908
- Odites euphema Meyrick, 1914
- Odites flavimaculata (Christoph, 1882)
- Odites fruticosa Meyrick, 1915
- Odites furfurosa (Meyrick, 1906)
- Odites glaphyra Meyrick, 1908
- Odites gomphias Meyrick, 1908
- Odites hederae Walsingham, 1900
- Odites homocirrha Diakonoff, [1968]
- Odites idonea Meyrick, 1925
- Odites incallida Meyrick, 1915
- Odites incolumis Meyrick, 1918
- Odites isocentra (Meyrick, 1906)
- Odites issikii (Takahashi, 1961)
- Odites kollarella (O. Costa, 1832)
- Odites lividula Meyrick, 1932
- Odites notocapna Meyrick, 1925
- Odites oligectis Meyrick, 1917
- Odites orthometra Meyrick, 1908
- Odites pancyclia Meyrick, 1928
- Odites paracyrta (Meyrick, 1905)
- Odites periscias Meyrick, 1928
- Odites perissa Diakonoff, [1968]
- Odites plocamoca Meyrick, 1935
- Odites practoria Meyrick, 1908
- Odites praefixa Meyrick, 1921
- Odites pragmatias Meyrick, 1914
- Odites psilotis (Meyrick, 1905)
- Odites pubescentella (Stainton, 1859)
- Odites ricinella (Stainton, 1859)
- Odites ricini (Stainton, 1859)
- Odites scribaria Meyrick, 1915
- Odites sphaerophyes Diakonoff, 1966
- Odites sphenidias Meyrick, 1914
- Odites subsignella (Rebel, 1893)
- Odites swinhoei (Butler, 1883)
- Odites ternatella (Staudinger, 1859)
- Odites velipotens Meyrick, 1935
- Odites venusta Moriuti, 1977
- Odites xenophaea Meyrick, 1931

== African species ==
- Odites aethiopicus Lvovsky, 2001
- Odites agathopella Viette, 1968
- Odites analogica Meyrick, 1917
- Odites anasticta Meyrick, 1930
- Odites anisocarpa Meyrick, 1930
- Odites arenella Legrand, 1966
- Odites argyrophanes (Meyrick, 1937)
- Odites armilligera Meyrick, 1922
- Odites artigena (Meyrick, 1914)
- Odites assidua Meyrick, 1914
- Odites atomosperma Meyrick, 1933
- Odites balanospila Meyrick, 1930
- Odites balsamias Meyrick, 1911
- Odites carcharopa Meyrick, 1914
- Odites carterella Walsingham, 1891
- Odites cataxantha Meyrick, 1915
- Odites circiformis Meyrick, 1930
- Odites citrantha Meyrick, 1908
- Odites citromela Meyrick, 1923
- Odites consecrata Meyrick, 1917
- Odites consignata Meyrick, 1921
- Odites crocota Meyrick, 1912
- Odites crossophanta Meyrick, 1930
- Odites cuculans Meyrick, 1918
- Odites dilutella (Walsingham, 1881)
- Odites diopta Meyrick, 1917
- Odites duodaca Diakonoff, 1948
- Odites emensa Meyrick, 1921
- Odites exterrita Meyrick, 1937
- Odites fessa Meyrick, 1921
- Odites fotsyella Viette, 1973
- Odites fructuosa Meyrick, 1915
- Odites haplogramma Meyrick, 1930
- Odites haplonoma Meyrick, 1915
- Odites hemigymna Meyrick, 1930
- Odites hemipercna Meyrick, 1914
- Odites heptasticta Meyrick, 1914
- Odites hermatica Meyrick, 1915
- Odites holocitra Meyrick, 1925
- Odites holotorna Meyrick, 1925
- Odites incolumis Meyrick, 1918
- Odites inconspicua Walsingham, 1891
- Odites incusata Meyrick, 1921
- Odites insons Meyrick, 1912
- Odites inversa Meyrick, 1914
- Odites johannae Viette, 1987
- Odites laconica Meyrick, 1927
- Odites lioxesta Meyrick, 1933
- Odites malagasiella Viette, 1967
- Odites matura Meyrick, 1914
- Odites meloxantha Meyrick, 1927
- Odites metaclista Meyrick, 1915
- Odites metaphracta Meyrick, 1909
- Odites metascia Meyrick, 1937
- Odites microbolista Meyrick, 1937
- Odites minetella Viette, 1985
- Odites monogona Meyrick, 1938
- Odites natalensis Walsingham, 1891
- Odites notosticta Meyrick, 1925
- Odites nubeculosa Meyrick, 1918
- Odites obumbrata Meyrick, 1925
- Odites obvia Meyrick, 1914
- Odites ochrodryas Meyrick, 1933
- Odites pedicata Meyrick, 1914
- Odites pelochrosta Meyrick, 1933
- Odites perfusella Viette, 1958
- Odites procellosa Meyrick, 1908
- Odites prosedra Meyrick, 1915
- Odites repetita Meyrick, 1932
- Odites semibrunnea Bradley, 1958
- Odites semisepta Meyrick, 1930
- Odites siccinervis Meyrick, 1930
- Odites sucinea Meyrick, 1915
- Odites superscripta Meyrick, 1926
- Odites thesmia Meyrick, 1917
- Odites tinactella Viette, 1958
- Odites tsaraella Viette, 1986
- Odites typota Meyrick, 1915

== Former species ==
- Odites malivora Meyrick, 1930
