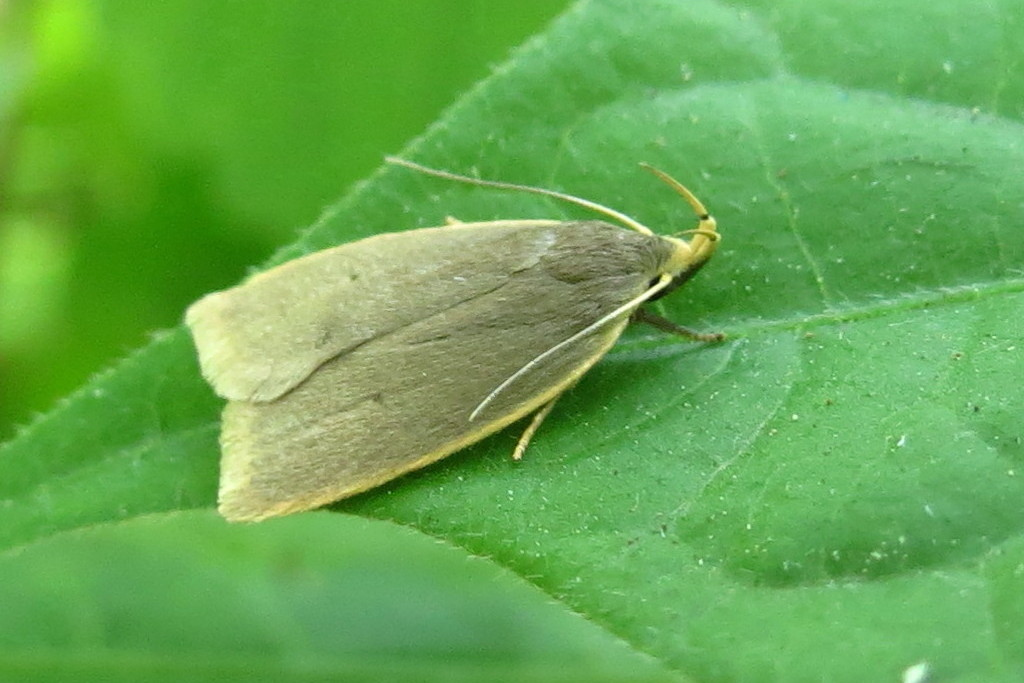
- Scythropiodes lividula

Scientific classification
- Kingdom: Animalia
- Phylum: Arthropoda
- Clade: Pancrustacea
- Class: Insecta
- Order: Lepidoptera
- Family: Lecithoceridae
- Subfamily: Lecithocerinae
- Genus: Scythropiodes; Matsumura, 1931

= Scythropiodes =

Genus of moths

Scythropiodes is a genus of moths in the family Lecithoceridae.

== Species ==
- Scythropiodes barbellatus Park & Wu, 1997
- Scythropiodes elasmatus Park & Wu, 1997
- Scythropiodes gnophus Park & Wu, 1997
- Scythropiodes hamatellus Park & Wu, 1997
- Scythropiodes jiulianae Park & Wu, 1997
- Scythropiodes leucostola (Meyrick, 1921)
- Scythropiodes malivora (Meyrick, 1930)
- Scythropiodes oncinius Park & Wu, 1997
- Scythropiodes triangulus Park & Wu, 1997
- Scythropiodes tribula (Wu, 1997)
- Scythropiodes ussuriella Lvovsky, 1996

== Former species ==
- Scythropiodes seriatopunctata Matsumura, 1931
- Scythropiodes unimaculata Matsumura, 1931
