= Odites subsignella =

Scientific classification
- Kingdom: Animalia
- Phylum: Arthropoda
- Class: Insecta
- Order: Lepidoptera
- Family: Depressariidae
- Genus: Odites
- Species: O. subsignella

Binomial name
- Odites subsignella (Rebel, 1893)

Synonyms
- Euteles subsignella Rebel, 1893

Species of moth

Odites subsignella is a moth in the family Depressariidae. It was described by Hans Rebel in 1893. It is found in the Caucasus.

The wingspan is about 15 mm. The forewings are evenly infuscated with grey. There are two dark dots, the first at one-third. The hindwings are whitish grey.
