= Odites metascia =

Scientific classification
- Kingdom: Animalia
- Phylum: Arthropoda
- Class: Insecta
- Order: Lepidoptera
- Family: Depressariidae
- Genus: Odites
- Species: O. metascia

Binomial name
- Odites metascia Meyrick, 1937

Species of moth

Odites metascia is a moth in the family Depressariidae. It was described by Edward Meyrick in 1937. It is found in South Africa.
