= Odites typota =

Scientific classification
- Kingdom: Animalia
- Phylum: Arthropoda
- Class: Insecta
- Order: Lepidoptera
- Family: Depressariidae
- Genus: Odites
- Species: O. typota

Binomial name
- Odites typota Meyrick, 1915

Species of moth

Odites typota is a moth in the family Depressariidae. It was described by Edward Meyrick in 1915. It is found in Madagascar.

The wingspan is 17–18 mm. The forewings are whitish brownish, more or less irrorated with fuscous and with the stigmata dark fuscous, the plical obliquely beyond the first discal. There is an obtusely angulated transverse series of dark fuscous dots at four-fifths and a pre-marginal series of cloudy dark fuscous dots around the posterior part of the costa and termen. The hindwings are whitish.
