= Odites haplonoma =

Scientific classification
- Kingdom: Animalia
- Phylum: Arthropoda
- Class: Insecta
- Order: Lepidoptera
- Family: Depressariidae
- Genus: Odites
- Species: O. haplonoma

Binomial name
- Odites haplonoma Meyrick, 1915

Species of moth

Odites haplonoma is a moth in the family Depressariidae. It was described by Edward Meyrick in 1915. It is found in Madagascar.

The wingspan is about 20 mm. The forewings are whitish ochreous with the second discal stigma fuscous. The hindwings are ochreous-grey whitish.
