= Odites ricinella =

Scientific classification
- Kingdom: Animalia
- Phylum: Arthropoda
- Clade: Pancrustacea
- Class: Insecta
- Order: Lepidoptera
- Family: Depressariidae
- Genus: Odites
- Species: O. ricinella

Binomial name
- Odites ricinella (Stainton, 1859)

Synonyms
- Depressaria ricinella Stainton, 1859

Species of moth

Odites ricinella is a moth in the family Depressariidae. It was described by Henry Tibbats Stainton in 1859. It is found in India.

The forewings gradually increase in breadth to beyond the middle, then become slightly narrower, the hind margin truncate, ochreous, with numerous small brown spots, and a larger darker spot on the disc before the middle. Towards the apex is frequently a curved row of brown dots. The hind margin is spotted with brown. The hindwings are whitish, with a few brown dots on the apical margin.

The larvae feed on Ricinus communis, rolling up the edge of a leaf. They are bright green with a black head.
