= Scythropiodes gnophus =

Scientific classification
- Kingdom: Animalia
- Phylum: Arthropoda
- Clade: Pancrustacea
- Class: Insecta
- Order: Lepidoptera
- Family: Lecithoceridae
- Genus: Scythropiodes
- Species: S. gnophus

Binomial name
- Scythropiodes gnophus Park & C. S. Wu, 1997

Species of moth

Scythropiodes gnophus is a moth in the family Lecithoceridae. It was described by Kyu-Tek Park and Chun-Sheng Wu in 1997. It is found in Sichuan, China.

The wingspan is 12–13 mm.
