= Odites centrias =

Scientific classification
- Kingdom: Animalia
- Phylum: Arthropoda
- Class: Insecta
- Order: Lepidoptera
- Family: Depressariidae
- Genus: Odites
- Species: O. centrias

Binomial name
- Odites centrias (Meyrick, 1894)

Synonyms
- Trichernis centrias Meyrick, 1894

Species of moth

Odites centrias is a moth in the family Depressariidae. It was described by Edward Meyrick in 1894. It is found in Burma, India and Sri Lanka.

The wingspan is 14–19 mm. The forewings are often almost whitish, the veins usually more or less distinctly lined with fuscous, most strongly in the palest specimens. There is a characteristic black dot on the origin of veins 4 and 5 which is always conspicuous. The hindwings are whitish ochreous.
