= Odites prosedra =

Scientific classification
- Kingdom: Animalia
- Phylum: Arthropoda
- Clade: Pancrustacea
- Class: Insecta
- Order: Lepidoptera
- Family: Depressariidae
- Genus: Odites
- Species: O. prosedra

Binomial name
- Odites prosedra Meyrick, 1915

Species of moth

Odites prosedra is a moth in the family Depressariidae. It was described by Edward Meyrick in 1915. It is found in Nigeria and the Democratic Republic of the Congo (Katanga).

The wingspan is about 20 mm. The forewings are pale brownish ochreous with the stigmata dark fuscous, the plical obliquely beyond the first discal, the second discal rather large. There is a series of dark fuscous dots from beneath three-fifths of the costa very obliquely outwards, obtusely angulated opposite the apex, and running to near the dorsum at four-fifths. A series of small dark fuscous dots is found around the apex and termen. The hindwings are ochreous whitish, hardly greyish tinged posteriorly.
