= Odites flavimaculata =

Scientific classification
- Kingdom: Animalia
- Phylum: Arthropoda
- Class: Insecta
- Order: Lepidoptera
- Family: Depressariidae
- Genus: Odites
- Species: O. flavimaculata

Binomial name
- Odites flavimaculata (Christoph, 1882)

Synonyms
- Eciteles flavimaculata Christoph, 1882

Species of moth

Odites flavimaculata is a moth in the family Depressariidae. It was described by Hugo Theodor Christoph in 1882. It is found in south-eastern Siberia in Russia.
