= Odites actuosa =

Scientific classification
- Kingdom: Animalia
- Phylum: Arthropoda
- Class: Insecta
- Order: Lepidoptera
- Family: Depressariidae
- Genus: Odites
- Species: O. actuosa

Binomial name
- Odites actuosa Meyrick, 1914

Species of moth

Odites actuosa is a moth in the family Depressariidae. It was described by Edward Meyrick in 1914. It is found in southern India.

The wingspan is about 18 mm. The forewings are pale greyish ochreous with a black dot on the base of the costa, and one at the base in the middle. The stigmata are black, the plical elongate, somewhat beyond the first discal. There is a series of black dots around the termen. The hindwings are light grey.
