= Odites metaphracta =

Scientific classification
- Kingdom: Animalia
- Phylum: Arthropoda
- Class: Insecta
- Order: Lepidoptera
- Family: Depressariidae
- Genus: Odites
- Species: O. metaphracta

Binomial name
- Odites metaphracta Meyrick, 1909

Species of moth

Odites metaphracta is a moth in the family Depressariidae. It was described by Edward Meyrick in 1909. It is found in South Africa.

The wingspan is about 27 mm. The forewings are whitish ochreous, with a faint yellowish tinge. The costal edge is fulvous. The hindwings are pale whitish ochreous.
