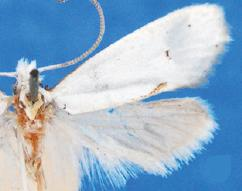
- Male
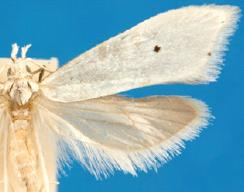
- Female

Scientific classification
- Domain: Eukaryota
- Kingdom: Animalia
- Phylum: Arthropoda
- Class: Insecta
- Order: Lepidoptera
- Family: Yponomeutidae
- Genus: Eucalantica
- Species: E. polita

Binomial name
- Eucalantica polita (Walsingham, 1881)

Synonyms
- Calantica polita Walsingham, 1881; Eucalantica polita

= Eucalantica polita =

Species of moth

Eucalantica polita is a moth in the family Yponomeutidae. It is found at the Pacific side of the coastal regions of Canada (British Columbia) and the United States (Washington, Oregon and California).
