= Odites incusata =

Scientific classification
- Kingdom: Animalia
- Phylum: Arthropoda
- Class: Insecta
- Order: Lepidoptera
- Family: Depressariidae
- Genus: Odites
- Species: O. incusata

Binomial name
- Odites incusata Meyrick, 1921

Species of moth

Odites incusata is a moth in the family Depressariidae. It was described by Edward Meyrick in 1921. It is found in Zimbabwe.

The wingspan is about 13 mm. The forewings are whitish ochreous, with scattered dark fuscous specks. The discal stigmata are moderately large and blackish, the plical only indicated by three or four blackish specks, rather obliquely beyond the first discal. There is a row of blackish pre-marginal dots around the posterior part of the costa and termen. The hindwings are pale bluish grey, with a whitish-ochreous gloss.
