= Odites obvia =

Scientific classification
- Kingdom: Animalia
- Phylum: Arthropoda
- Class: Insecta
- Order: Lepidoptera
- Family: Depressariidae
- Genus: Odites
- Species: O. obvia

Binomial name
- Odites obvia Meyrick, 1914

Species of moth

Odites obvia is a moth in the family Depressariidae. It was described by Edward Meyrick in 1914. It is found in South Africa.

The wingspan is 14–15 mm. The forewings are whitish ochreous. The stigmata are blackish, the plical rather obliquely before the first discal. There is a series of small blackish almost marginal dots around the apex and termen. The hindwings are ochreous whitish, slightly greyish tinged towards the apex.
