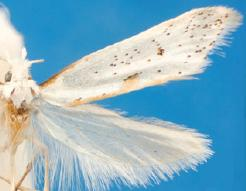
- Male

Scientific classification
- Domain: Eukaryota
- Kingdom: Animalia
- Phylum: Arthropoda
- Class: Insecta
- Order: Lepidoptera
- Family: Yponomeutidae
- Genus: Eucalantica
- Species: E. icarusella

Binomial name
- Eucalantica icarusella Sohn & Nishida, 2011

= Eucalantica icarusella =

Species of moth

Eucalantica icarusella is a moth in the family Yponomeutidae. It is found in Costa Rica (high elevations of Cartago, Heredia and San José provinces).

The length of the forewings is 5.3-7.9 mm.
