= Scythropiodes hamatellus =

Scientific classification
- Kingdom: Animalia
- Phylum: Arthropoda
- Clade: Pancrustacea
- Class: Insecta
- Order: Lepidoptera
- Family: Lecithoceridae
- Genus: Scythropiodes
- Species: S. hamatellus

Binomial name
- Scythropiodes hamatellus Park & C. S. Wu, 1997

Species of moth

Scythropiodes hamatellus is a moth in the family Lecithoceridae. It was described by Kyu-Tek Park and Chun-Sheng Wu in 1997. It is found in Korea and Sichuan, China.

The wingspan is 17–18 mm.

== Etymology ==
The species name is derived from Latin hamatus (meaning hooked).
