= Odites matura =

Scientific classification
- Kingdom: Animalia
- Phylum: Arthropoda
- Class: Insecta
- Order: Lepidoptera
- Family: Depressariidae
- Genus: Odites
- Species: O. matura

Binomial name
- Odites matura Meyrick, 1914

Synonyms
- Odites melititis Meyrick

Species of moth

Odites matura is a moth in the family Depressariidae. It was described by Edward Meyrick in 1914. It is found in Malawi.

The wingspan is about 19 mm. The forewings are pale ochreous yellowish with the costal edge pale fulvous ochreous. The hindwings are light grey.
