= Odites cataxantha =

Scientific classification
- Kingdom: Animalia
- Phylum: Arthropoda
- Class: Insecta
- Order: Lepidoptera
- Family: Depressariidae
- Genus: Odites
- Species: O. cataxantha

Binomial name
- Odites cataxantha Meyrick, 1915

Species of moth

Odites cataxantha is a moth in the family Depressariidae. It was described by Edward Meyrick in 1915. It is found in Madagascar.

The wingspan is about 14 mm. The forewings are deep yellow ochreous, faintly brownish tinged. The stigmata are dark fuscous, the plical small and indistinct, midway between the first and second discal. There is a pre-marginal series of dark fuscous dots around the posterior part of the costa and termen. The hindwings are ochreous whitish.
