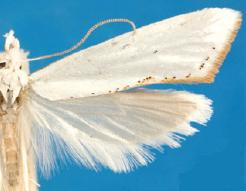
- Female

Scientific classification
- Domain: Eukaryota
- Kingdom: Animalia
- Phylum: Arthropoda
- Class: Insecta
- Order: Lepidoptera
- Family: Yponomeutidae
- Genus: Eucalantica
- Species: E. powelli

Binomial name
- Eucalantica powelli Sohn, 2011

= Eucalantica powelli =

Species of moth

Eucalantica powelli is a moth in the family Yponomeutidae. It is found in Costa Rica (high elevations of Cartago Province).

The length of the forewings is 7–10 mm.
