= Odites furfurosa =

Scientific classification
- Kingdom: Animalia
- Phylum: Arthropoda
- Class: Insecta
- Order: Lepidoptera
- Family: Depressariidae
- Genus: Odites
- Species: O. furfurosa

Binomial name
- Odites furfurosa (Meyrick, 1906)

Synonyms
- Myriopleura furfurosa Meyrick, 1906

Species of moth

Odites furfurosa is a moth in the family Depressariidae. It was described by Edward Meyrick in 1906. It is found in Sri Lanka.

The wingspan is 14–19 mm. The forewings are pale yellowish ochreous, in females more whitish ochreous. The discal stigmata are cloudy and fuscous, the first very small and often indistinct, the second larger and distinct. The hindwings in males are fuscous, while they are whitish ochreous in females, sometimes fuscous tinged.
