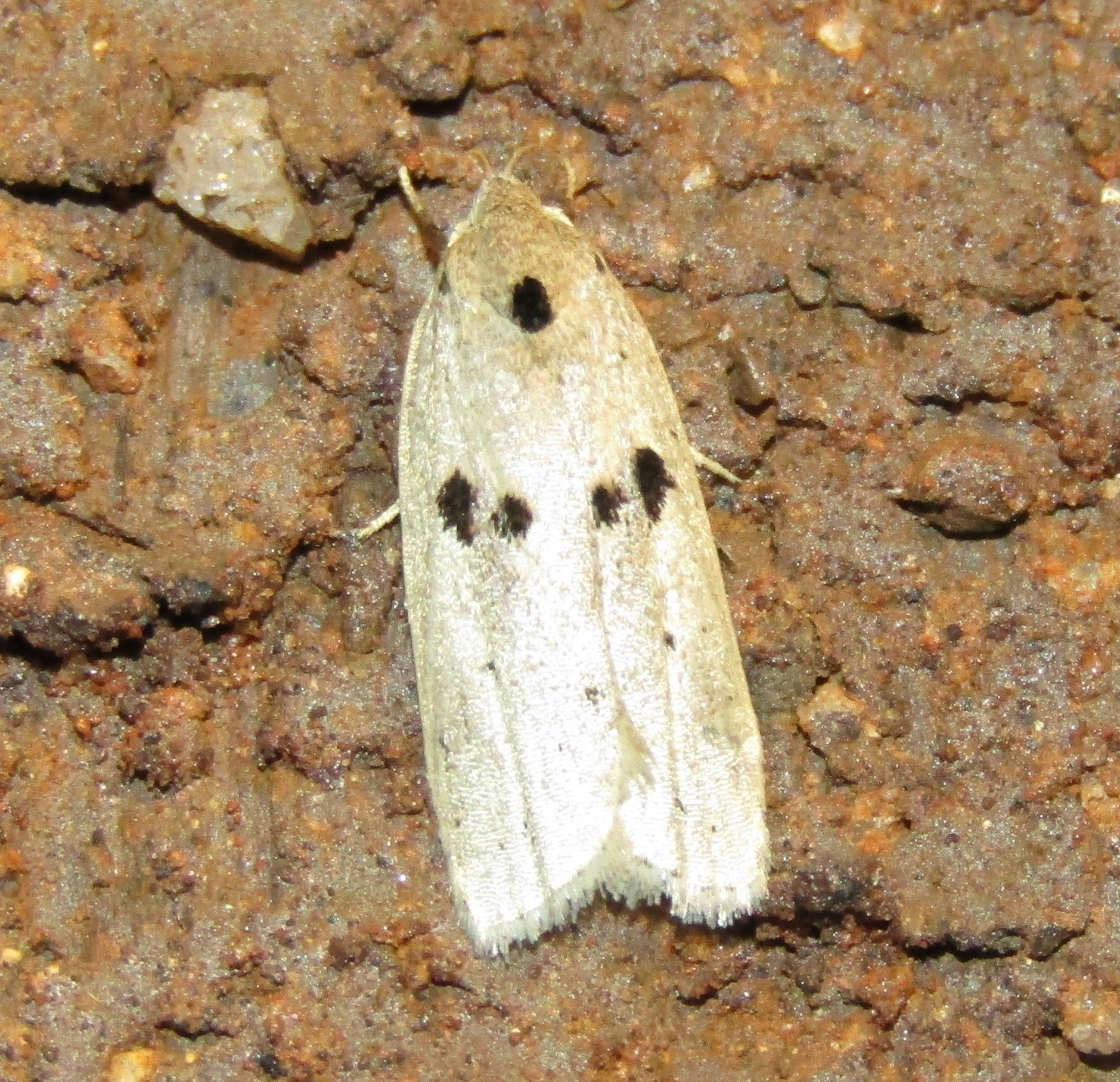

Scientific classification
- Kingdom: Animalia
- Phylum: Arthropoda
- Clade: Pancrustacea
- Class: Insecta
- Order: Lepidoptera
- Family: Depressariidae
- Genus: Odites
- Species: O. issikii

Binomial name
- Odites issikii (Takahashi, 1930)

Synonyms
- Depressaria issikii Takahashi, 1930; Scythropiodes issikii

= Odites issikii =

Species of moth

Odites issikii is a moth in the family Depressariidae. It was described by Ryoichi Takahashi in 1930. It is found in Japan, Korea, China and Russia.

The wingspan is 14–19 mm.

The larvae have been recorded feeding on Gardenia jasminoides, Malus pumila, Pyrus simonii, Populus nigra, Prunus species, Salix species, Smilax china, Ulmus pavifolia, Viburnum awabuki and Weigela coreaensis.
