= Odites lividula =

Scientific classification
- Kingdom: Animalia
- Phylum: Arthropoda
- Class: Insecta
- Order: Lepidoptera
- Family: Depressariidae
- Genus: Odites
- Species: O. lividula

Binomial name
- Odites lividula Meyrick, 1932

Species of moth

Odites lividula is a moth in the family Depressariidae. It was described by Edward Meyrick in 1932. It is found in Japan.
