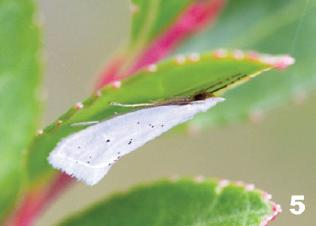
- Adult
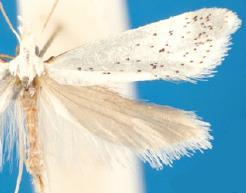
- Female

Scientific classification
- Kingdom: Animalia
- Phylum: Arthropoda
- Class: Insecta
- Order: Lepidoptera
- Family: Yponomeutidae
- Genus: Eucalantica
- Species: E. costaricae

Binomial name
- Eucalantica costaricae Sohn & Nishida, 2011

= Eucalantica costaricae =

Species of moth

Eucalantica costaricae is a moth in the family Yponomeutidae. It is found in Costa Rica (high elevations of Cerro de la Muerte of the Talamancan Mountain Range in Cartago and San José provinces).

The length of the forewings is 6.5–8 mm.

Adults have been collected exclusively from the high elevation forests of Cerro de la Muerte where oaks are dominant below 3,300 meters. One individual has been found resting on the underside of a leaf of Vaccinium floribundum, which is likely the larval host.

== Etymology ==
The species is named after Costa Rica, where the type locality is situated.
