= Odites ternatella =

Scientific classification
- Kingdom: Animalia
- Phylum: Arthropoda
- Class: Insecta
- Order: Lepidoptera
- Family: Depressariidae
- Genus: Odites
- Species: O. ternatella

Binomial name
- Odites ternatella (Staudinger, 1859)

Synonyms
- Gelechia ternatella Staudinger, 1859; Borkhausenia panormitella Rebel, 1915

Species of moth

Odites ternatella is a moth in the family, Depressariidae. It was described by Otto Staudinger in 1859. It is found in Portugal, Spain, Luxembourg and Romania, as well as on Sicily.

The wingspan is 14–15 mm. The forewings are dirty straw yellow with three dark point in the form of a triangle. There is a row of black dots along the outer margin. The hindwings are light yellow in males, more blackish in females.
