= Odites lioxesta =

Scientific classification
- Kingdom: Animalia
- Phylum: Arthropoda
- Class: Insecta
- Order: Lepidoptera
- Family: Depressariidae
- Genus: Odites
- Species: O. lioxesta

Binomial name
- Odites lioxesta Meyrick, 1933

Species of moth

Odites lioxesta is a moth in the family Depressariidae. It was described by Edward Meyrick in 1933. It is endemic to Madagascar.

The wingspan of the holotype, a male, is 12 mm (0.47 in).
