= Odites monogona =

Scientific classification
- Kingdom: Animalia
- Phylum: Arthropoda
- Class: Insecta
- Order: Lepidoptera
- Family: Depressariidae
- Genus: Odites
- Species: O. monogona

Binomial name
- Odites monogona Meyrick, 1938

Species of moth

Odites monogona is a moth in the family Depressariidae. It was described by Edward Meyrick in 1938. It is found in the Democratic Republic of the Congo (Orientale, North Kivu).
