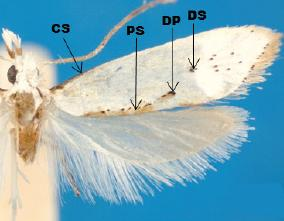

Scientific classification
- Domain: Eukaryota
- Kingdom: Animalia
- Phylum: Arthropoda
- Class: Insecta
- Order: Lepidoptera
- Family: Yponomeutidae
- Genus: Eucalantica
- Species: E. ehecatlella

Binomial name
- Eucalantica ehecatlella Sohn & Nishida, 2011

= Eucalantica ehecatlella =

Species of moth

Eucalantica ehecatlella is a moth in the family Yponomeutidae. It is found in Costa Rica (Central Volcanic Range in Heredia Province).

The length of the forewings is 5-6.2 mm.
