= Odites albidella =

Scientific classification
- Kingdom: Animalia
- Phylum: Arthropoda
- Class: Insecta
- Order: Lepidoptera
- Family: Depressariidae
- Genus: Odites
- Species: O. albidella

Binomial name
- Odites albidella (Snellen, 1901)

Synonyms
- Symmoca albidella Snellen, 1901

Species of moth

Odites albidella is a moth in the family Depressariidae. It was described by Pieter Cornelius Tobias Snellen in 1901. It is found on Java.
