= Odites cuculans =

Scientific classification
- Kingdom: Animalia
- Phylum: Arthropoda
- Class: Insecta
- Order: Lepidoptera
- Family: Depressariidae
- Genus: Odites
- Species: O. cuculans

Binomial name
- Odites cuculans Meyrick, 1918

Species of moth

Odites cuculans is a moth in the family Depressariidae. It was described by Edward Meyrick in 1918. It is found in Mozambique and the Republic of the Congo.

The wingspan is 15–19 mm. The forewings are whitish yellowish with the costal edge sometimes slightly brownish tinged anteriorly. There is a blackish dot towards the costa in the middle, and one on the lower angle of the cell. The hindwings are whitish ochreous.
