= Odites fructuosa =

Scientific classification
- Kingdom: Animalia
- Phylum: Arthropoda
- Class: Insecta
- Order: Lepidoptera
- Family: Depressariidae
- Genus: Odites
- Species: O. fructuosa

Binomial name
- Odites fructuosa Meyrick, 1915

Species of moth

Odites fructuosa is a moth in the family Depressariidae. It was described by Edward Meyrick in 1915. It is found on the Comoros, where it has been recorded from Mayotte.

The wingspan is 13–17 mm. The forewings are shining white with a small blackish spot on the dorsum near the base and two very oblique black strigulae from the costa towards the middle, the second terminated by a ferruginous-yellow short streak or series of marks. The first discal stigma is blackish, sometimes yellow tinged, the second represented by two very obliquely placed ferruginous-yellow dots sometimes mixed with black. The veins towards the costa are posteriorly marked with black lines and there is a cloudy semicircular dark grey blotch on the dorsum before the middle, and a transverse blotch at three-fourths, the dorsal space between these and the whole terminal area, except towards the costa in females, grey. The apical margin is black, and there are some small blackish dots on the termen. The hindwings are ochreous whitish with a small blackish mark on the apical margin.
