= Odites inversa =

Scientific classification
- Kingdom: Animalia
- Phylum: Arthropoda
- Clade: Pancrustacea
- Class: Insecta
- Order: Lepidoptera
- Family: Depressariidae
- Genus: Odites
- Species: O. inversa

Binomial name
- Odites inversa Meyrick, 1914

Species of moth

Odites inversa is a moth in the family Depressariidae. It was described by Edward Meyrick in 1914. It is found in the Republic of the Congo, the Democratic Republic of the Congo (Orientale, Katanga, West Kasai, North Kivu), Kenya, Madagascar and South Africa.

The wingspan is 11–13 mm. The forewings are ochreous yellow, with a few scattered dark fuscous specks. The stigmata are blackish, the plical obliquely beyond the first discal. There is an almost marginal row of blackish dots around the posterior part of the costa and termen. The hindwings are ochreous whitish.
