= Odites paracyrta =

Scientific classification
- Kingdom: Animalia
- Phylum: Arthropoda
- Class: Insecta
- Order: Lepidoptera
- Family: Depressariidae
- Genus: Odites
- Species: O. paracyrta

Binomial name
- Odites paracyrta (Meyrick, 1905)

Synonyms
- Xylorycta paracyrta Meyrick, 1905

Species of moth

Odites paracyrta is a moth in the family Depressariidae. It was described by Edward Meyrick in 1905. It is found in Sri Lanka.

The wingspan is about 23 mm. The forewings are whitish ochreous with a small round cloudy fuscous spot in the disc beyond the middle. There is a faint curved transverse shade of fuscous suffusion at four-fifths, parallel to the posterior part of the costa and termen. The hindwings are pale whitish ochreous.
