= Odites hermatica =

Scientific classification
- Kingdom: Animalia
- Phylum: Arthropoda
- Class: Insecta
- Order: Lepidoptera
- Family: Depressariidae
- Genus: Odites
- Species: O. hermatica

Binomial name
- Odites hermatica Meyrick, 1915

Species of moth

Odites hermatica is a moth in the family Depressariidae. It was described by Edward Meyrick in 1915. It is found on the Comoros, where it has been recorded from Mayotte.

The wingspan is 15–16 mm. The forewings are pale brownish ochreous with the stigmata dark fuscous, the plical very obliquely beyond the first discal, nearer the second. There is an obtusely angulated transverse series of undefined dark fuscous dots or scattered scales at four-fifths and a pre-marginal series of dark fuscous dots around the posterior part of the costa and termen. The hindwings are whitish ochreous.
