= Odites scribaria =

Scientific classification
- Kingdom: Animalia
- Phylum: Arthropoda
- Class: Insecta
- Order: Lepidoptera
- Family: Depressariidae
- Genus: Odites
- Species: O. scribaria

Binomial name
- Odites scribaria Meyrick, 1915

Species of moth

Odites scribaria is a moth in the family Depressariidae. It was described by Edward Meyrick in 1915. It is found on the Solomon Islands and New Guinea.

The wingspan is 21–26 mm. The forewings are white with a black speck in the middle of the base and a black dot beneath the costa near the base, one towards the costa at one-fourth, and one towards the dorsum somewhat before this. The stigmata are raised and black, the plical obliquely beyond the first discal. There is a short oblique blackish mark or spot on the middle of the costa, where a very strongly curved subterminal series of blackish dots runs to the dorsum before the tornus. A more or less developed series of black dots is found around the apex and termen. The hindwings are white.
