= Odites obumbrata =

Scientific classification
- Kingdom: Animalia
- Phylum: Arthropoda
- Class: Insecta
- Order: Lepidoptera
- Family: Depressariidae
- Genus: Odites
- Species: O. obumbrata

Binomial name
- Odites obumbrata Meyrick, 1925

Synonyms
- Odites odumbrata

Species of moth

Odites obumbrata is a moth in the family Depressariidae. It was described by Edward Meyrick in 1925 and is found in Zimbabwe.

The wingspan is about 18 mm. The forewings are fuscous, with a moderate attenuated whitish-ochreous costal streak from the base to beyond the middle, the costal edge is slenderly fuscous towards the base. The hindwings are blackish grey.
