= Odites argyrophanes =

Scientific classification
- Kingdom: Animalia
- Phylum: Arthropoda
- Class: Insecta
- Order: Lepidoptera
- Family: Depressariidae
- Genus: Odites
- Species: O. argyrophanes

Binomial name
- Odites argyrophanes (Meyrick, 1937)

Synonyms
- Encolpotis argyrophanes Meyrick, 1937

Species of moth

Odites argyrophanes is a moth in the family Depressariidae. It was described by Edward Meyrick in 1937. It is found in South Africa, where it has been recorded from KwaZulu-Natal.
