= Saridoscelis =

Scientific classification
- Kingdom: Animalia
- Phylum: Arthropoda
- Class: Insecta
- Order: Lepidoptera
- Family: Yponomeutidae
- Subfamily: Saridoscelinae
- Genus: Saridoscelis; Meyrick, 1894

Species
- See text

Genus of moths

Saridoscelis is a genus of moths in the family Yponomeutidae.

== Species ==
- Saridoscelis issikii - Moriuti, 1961
- Saridoscelis kodamai - Moriuti, 1961
- Saridoscelis nudata - Meyrick, 1913
- Saridoscelis sphenias - Meyrick, 1894
- Saridoscelis synodias - Meyrick, 1932
- Saridoscelis diffusolinearum - Lu & Hsu, 2023
