= Odites ochrodryas =

Scientific classification
- Kingdom: Animalia
- Phylum: Arthropoda
- Class: Insecta
- Order: Lepidoptera
- Family: Depressariidae
- Genus: Odites
- Species: O. ochrodryas

Binomial name
- Odites ochrodryas Meyrick, 1933

Species of moth

Odites ochrodryas is a moth in the family Depressariidae. It was described by Edward Meyrick in 1933. It is endemic to Madagascar.

The wingspan of the holotype, a female, is 17 mm. The forewings are ochreous brownish with slight rufous tinge. The extreme costal edge is whitish. The hindwings are grey.
