= Odites fessa =

Scientific classification
- Kingdom: Animalia
- Phylum: Arthropoda
- Class: Insecta
- Order: Lepidoptera
- Family: Depressariidae
- Genus: Odites
- Species: O. fessa

Binomial name
- Odites fessa Meyrick, 1921

Species of moth

Odites fessa is a moth in the family Depressariidae. It was described by Edward Meyrick in 1921. It is found in South Africa.

The wingspan is about 20 mm. The forewings are whitish ochreous with the discal stigmata represented each only by two or three blackish specks. The hindwings are grey whitish.
