= Odites metaclista =

Scientific classification
- Kingdom: Animalia
- Phylum: Arthropoda
- Class: Insecta
- Order: Lepidoptera
- Family: Depressariidae
- Genus: Odites
- Species: O. metaclista

Binomial name
- Odites metaclista Meyrick, 1915

Species of moth

Odites metaclista is a moth in the family Depressariidae. It was described by Edward Meyrick in 1915. It is found in Madagascar, South Africa and Zimbabwe.

The wingspan is 14–15 mm. The forewings are light ochreous yellowish with a dark fuscous mark on the base of the costa. The stigmata are dark fuscous, the plical obliquely beyond the first discal, somewhat nearer the second, the second discal lying on the anterior edge of a rather oblique postmedian fuscous fascia, whose posterior edge is excavated above the middle. There is a cloudy fuscous patch resting on the upper half of the termen and there is a pre-marginal series of dark fuscous dots around the apical part of the costa and termen. The hindwings are ochreous whitish, tinged with grey posteriorly.
