= Odites encarsia =

Scientific classification
- Kingdom: Animalia
- Phylum: Arthropoda
- Class: Insecta
- Order: Lepidoptera
- Family: Depressariidae
- Genus: Odites
- Species: O. encarsia

Binomial name
- Odites encarsia Meyrick, 1908

Species of moth

Odites encarsia is a moth in the family Depressariidae. It was described by Edward Meyrick in 1908. It is found in southern India.

The wingspan is 16–17 mm. The forewings are whitish ochreous, with some veins indistinctly streaked with pale yellow ochreous and with an oblique patch of pale brownish suffusion from the dorsum near the base to the fold. There is an oblique blackish linear mark crossing the end of the cell, followed by some brownish suffusion tending to extend itself along the veins. The hindwings are ochre-whitish.
