= Odites pedicata =

Scientific classification
- Kingdom: Animalia
- Phylum: Arthropoda
- Class: Insecta
- Order: Lepidoptera
- Family: Depressariidae
- Genus: Odites
- Species: O. pedicata

Binomial name
- Odites pedicata Meyrick, 1914

Species of moth

Odites pedicata is a moth in the family Depressariidae. It was described by Edward Meyrick in 1914. It is found on the Comoros.

The wingspan is about 22 mm. The forewings are white with the costal edge pale brownish ochreous and the stigmata minute and blackish, the plical very obliquely beyond the first discal, nearer the second. There is a strongly curved subterminal series of cloudy dark fuscous dots between the veins, and a similar pre-marginal series around the apex and termen. The hindwings are white.
