= Odites dilutella =

Scientific classification
- Kingdom: Animalia
- Phylum: Arthropoda
- Class: Insecta
- Order: Lepidoptera
- Family: Depressariidae
- Genus: Odites
- Species: O. dilutella

Binomial name
- Odites dilutella (Walsingham, 1881)

Synonyms
- Cryptolechia dilutella Walsingham, 1881

Species of moth

Odites dilutella is a moth in the family Depressariidae. It was described by Lord Walsingham in 1881. It is found in South Africa.

The wingspan is about 17 mm. The forewings are pale whitish ochreous, the costa very faintly and narrowly shaded with ochreous and with a small patch of elongated scales on the dorsal margin near the base, forming an appressed tuft, a small fuscous discal spot a little above the middle of the wing at one-fourth from the base, followed by another nearly obsolete spot towards the end of the cell, situated in the middle of a narrow oblique subfuscous shade. Beneath these two, and equidistant from each, is another indistinct spot on the fold. Halfway between the end of the cell and the apex is a semicircular series of almost obsolete fuscous dots running nearly parallel to the margin of the wing, and on the apical margin itself is a series of rather more distinct but scarcely larger dots of the same colour. There is also a very minute fuscous shade on the extreme apex of the costa. The hindwings are pale cinereous.
