= Odites thesmia =

Scientific classification
- Kingdom: Animalia
- Phylum: Arthropoda
- Class: Insecta
- Order: Lepidoptera
- Family: Depressariidae
- Genus: Odites
- Species: O. thesmia

Binomial name
- Odites thesmia Meyrick, 1917

Species of moth

Odites thesmia is a moth in the family Depressariidae. It was described by Edward Meyrick in 1917. It is found in Madagascar.

The wingspan is about 17 mm. The forewings are grey whitish irrorated with grey. The stigmata are black, the plical obliquely beyond the first discal. There is an angulated series of small blackish dots from beneath two-thirds of the costa to above the tornus and an almost marginal series of blackish dots along the termen. The hindwings are whitish.
