= Odites notosticta =

Scientific classification
- Kingdom: Animalia
- Phylum: Arthropoda
- Class: Insecta
- Order: Lepidoptera
- Family: Depressariidae
- Genus: Odites
- Species: O. notosticta

Binomial name
- Odites notosticta Meyrick, 1925

Species of moth

Odites notosticta is a moth in the family Depressariidae. It was described by Edward Meyrick in 1925. It is found in Cameroon.

The wingspan is about 19 mm. The forewings are yellow whitish with a cloudy grey spot on the dorsum at one-third. The discal stigmata are small, suffused and light yellowish grey. The hindwings are whitish.
