= Odites euphema =

Scientific classification
- Kingdom: Animalia
- Phylum: Arthropoda
- Class: Insecta
- Order: Lepidoptera
- Family: Depressariidae
- Genus: Odites
- Species: O. euphema

Binomial name
- Odites euphema Meyrick, 1914

Species of moth

Odites euphema is a moth in the family Depressariidae. It was described by Edward Meyrick in 1914. It is found in southern India.

The wingspan is 15–17 mm. The forewings are ochreous yellowish with the second discal stigma moderate, round and dark fuscous. The hindwings are whitish yellowish.
