= Scythropiodes leucostola =

Scientific classification
- Kingdom: Animalia
- Phylum: Arthropoda
- Class: Insecta
- Order: Lepidoptera
- Family: Lecithoceridae
- Genus: Scythropiodes
- Species: S. leucostola

Binomial name
- Scythropiodes leucostola (Meyrick, 1921)

Synonyms
- Protobathra leucostola Meyrick, 1921; Odites leucostola; Scythropiodes leucostola; Scythropiodes seriatopunctata Matsumura, 1931

Species of moth

Scythropiodes leucostola is a moth in the family Lecithoceridae. It was described by Edward Meyrick in 1921. It is found in Japan and Korea.

The wingspan is about 17 mm. The forewings are white with scattered grey and blackish spots and a blackish linear dot towards the costa near the base. The stigmata are rather large, blackish, the plical obliquely beyond the first discal. There is a blackish dot beneath the costa before the middle and a strongly curved series of rather large dark grey dots from beneath the costa at two-thirds to the dorsum before the tornus, interrupted below the middle. There is also a marginal series of small blackish-grey dots around the apex and termen. The hindwings are whitish grey.

The larvae have been recorded feeding on Abies firma, Malus pumila, Acer species, Shiia species, Quercus species, Celtis sinensis, Zelkova serrata, Ulmus species, Acacia species, Acschynomence species, Elaeagnus species, Acanthopanax spinosum and Peucedanum decurvum.
