= Odites citrantha =

Scientific classification
- Kingdom: Animalia
- Phylum: Arthropoda
- Class: Insecta
- Order: Lepidoptera
- Family: Depressariidae
- Genus: Odites
- Species: O. citrantha

Binomial name
- Odites citrantha Meyrick, 1908

Species of moth

Odites citrantha is a moth in the family Depressariidae. It was described by Edward Meyrick in 1908. It is found in South Africa, where it has been recorded from KwaZulu-Natal.

The wingspan is about 21 mm. The forewings are clear yellow with the discal stigmata minute and blackish. The hindwings are ochreous whitish.
