= Odites agraula =

Scientific classification
- Kingdom: Animalia
- Phylum: Arthropoda
- Class: Insecta
- Order: Lepidoptera
- Family: Depressariidae
- Genus: Odites
- Species: O. agraula

Binomial name
- Odites agraula Meyrick, 1908

Species of moth

Odites agraula is a moth in the family Depressariidae. It was described by Edward Meyrick in 1908. It is found in southern India.

The wingspan is 19–22 mm. The forewings are whitish ochreous, the costal edge yellowish tinged and with a black dot beneath the costa near the base, and the base of the costa more or less suffused with dark fuscous. The discal stigmata are black, the first followed by a minute black dot obliquely above it, the second transversely double, the upper tending to form a short inwardly oblique mark. The plical stigma is indicated by a few blackish scales on the fold midway between the discal and there is a patch of fuscous suffusion on the costa in the middle, and another before the apex. Sometimes, there are indications of a fascia of fuscous irroration from the central costal patch to the tornus. There is also a terminal series of undefined dark fuscous dots. The hindwings are ochreous whitish.
