= Odites aethiopicus =

Scientific classification
- Kingdom: Animalia
- Phylum: Arthropoda
- Clade: Pancrustacea
- Class: Insecta
- Order: Lepidoptera
- Family: Depressariidae
- Genus: Odites
- Species: O. aethiopicus

Binomial name
- Odites aethiopicus Lvovsky, 2001

Species of moth

Odites aethiopicus is a moth in the family Depressariidae. It was described by Alexandr L. Lvovsky in 2001. It is found in Ethiopia.
