= Odites xenophaea =

Scientific classification
- Kingdom: Animalia
- Phylum: Arthropoda
- Class: Insecta
- Order: Lepidoptera
- Family: Depressariidae
- Genus: Odites
- Species: O. xenophaea

Binomial name
- Odites xenophaea Meyrick, 1931

Species of moth

Odites xenophaea is a moth in the family Depressariidae. It was described by Edward Meyrick in 1931. It is found in China.
