= Odites incallida =

Scientific classification
- Kingdom: Animalia
- Phylum: Arthropoda
- Class: Insecta
- Order: Lepidoptera
- Family: Depressariidae
- Genus: Odites
- Species: O. incallida

Binomial name
- Odites incallida Meyrick, 1915

Species of moth

Odites incallida is a moth in the family Depressariidae. It was described by Edward Meyrick in 1915. It is found in southern India.

The wingspan is about 17 mm. The forewings are pale ochreous yellowish and the hindwings are light grey.
