= Odites incolumis =

Scientific classification
- Kingdom: Animalia
- Phylum: Arthropoda
- Class: Insecta
- Order: Lepidoptera
- Family: Depressariidae
- Genus: Odites
- Species: O. incolumis

Binomial name
- Odites incolumis Meyrick, 1918

Species of moth

Odites incolumis is a moth in the family Depressariidae. It was described by Edward Meyrick in 1918. It is found in Mozambique.

The wingspan is about 16 mm. The forewings are white with a black dot towards the costa near the base. The stigmata are black, the plical obliquely beyond the first discal, almost equally near the second. There is a curved subterminal series of several minute groups of black scales in the disc and an almost marginal series of small black dots around the posterior part of the costa and termen. The hindwings are pale grey.
