= Odites hederae =

Scientific classification
- Kingdom: Animalia
- Phylum: Arthropoda
- Class: Insecta
- Order: Lepidoptera
- Family: Depressariidae
- Genus: Odites
- Species: O. hederae

Binomial name
- Odites hederae Walsingham, 1900

Species of moth

Odites hederae is a moth in the family Depressariidae. It was described by Lord Walsingham in 1900. It is found in southern India.

The wingspan is about 21 mm for males and 28 mm for females. The forewings are pale fawn, mottled with brown and brownish fuscous, the extreme base of the costa suffused with brownish fuscous scales. A strong group of brown mottlings appears to arise from the dorsum near the base, crossing the fold obliquely outwards and terminating in two patches of brownish fuscous, the one on the cell somewhat diffused, the other narrow and running along the fold. A fascia-form brownish shade, intermixed with brownish fuscous scales, leaves the middle of the costa and, gradually reduced in width, reaches to the dorsum before the tornus. This is followed before the apex by one or two short longitudinal streaks of brownish fuscous, which do not quite reach the costal cilia. Along the termen is a series of five or six rather small brownish fuscous spots, the pale fawn cilia being divided by a brownish line. The hindwings are shining whitish fawn.

The larvae feed on ivy, sometimes spinning two leaves together flat and living between them, sometimes rolling up the leaves. They are pale green with a brown head and about 25 mm long.
