= Odites gomphias =

Scientific classification
- Kingdom: Animalia
- Phylum: Arthropoda
- Class: Insecta
- Order: Lepidoptera
- Family: Depressariidae
- Genus: Odites
- Species: O. gomphias

Binomial name
- Odites gomphias Meyrick, 1908

Synonyms
- Odites gymnodoxa Meyrick

Species of moth

Odites gomphias is a moth in the family Depressariidae. It was described by Edward Meyrick in 1908. It is found in Sri Lanka.

The wingspan is 15–23 mm. The forewings are ochreous whitish with an oblique black interrupted line in the disc marking the end of the cell. There are undefined streaks of ochreous or fuscous suffusion around the upper and posterior margins of the cell, beneath the costa posteriorly, from the discal mark to the middle of the termen (sometimes double), and an oblique streak from the dorsum towards the base. A blackish mark is found on the costal edge before the apex, and one on the middle of the termen. The hindwings are ochreous whitish.
