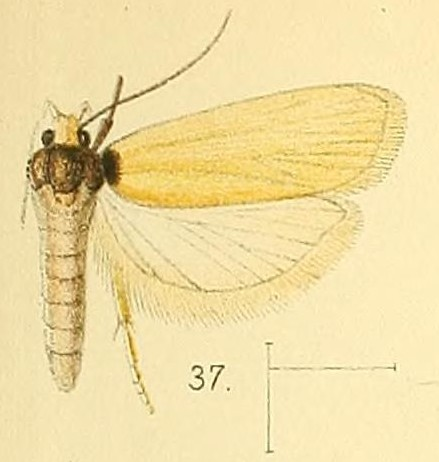

Scientific classification
- Kingdom: Animalia
- Phylum: Arthropoda
- Class: Insecta
- Order: Lepidoptera
- Family: Depressariidae
- Genus: Odites
- Species: O. carterella

Binomial name
- Odites carterella Walsingham, 1891

= Odites carterella =

Species of moth

Odites carterella is a moth in the family Depressariidae. It was described by Lord Walsingham in 1891. It is found in Gambia.

The wingspan is about 15 mm. The forewings are shining pale stramineous ochreous, with a very short dark brown basal patch, of which the outer margin is slightly bulged below the middle. The hindwings are shining whitish, with a faint greyish ochreous tinge.
