= Odites approximans =

Scientific classification
- Kingdom: Animalia
- Phylum: Arthropoda
- Class: Insecta
- Order: Lepidoptera
- Family: Depressariidae
- Genus: Odites
- Species: O. approximans

Binomial name
- Odites approximans Caradja, 1927

Synonyms
- Scythropiodes approximans

Species of moth

Odites approximans is a moth in the family Depressariidae. It was described by Aristide Caradja in 1927. It is found in the Russian Far East, Korea and China.

The wingspan is 19–23 mm.
