= Odites pubescentella =

Scientific classification
- Kingdom: Animalia
- Phylum: Arthropoda
- Clade: Pancrustacea
- Class: Insecta
- Order: Lepidoptera
- Family: Depressariidae
- Genus: Odites
- Species: O. pubescentella

Binomial name
- Odites pubescentella (Stainton, 1859)

Synonyms
- Gelechia pubescentella Stainton, 1859

Species of moth

Odites pubescentella is a moth in the family Depressariidae. It was described by Henry Tibbats Stainton in 1859. It is found in India.

The forewings are shining pale greyish brown, with an indistinct darker dot on the disc beyond the middle. The hindwings are pale grey.
