= Odites sphenidias =

Scientific classification
- Kingdom: Animalia
- Phylum: Arthropoda
- Class: Insecta
- Order: Lepidoptera
- Family: Depressariidae
- Genus: Odites
- Species: O. sphenidias

Binomial name
- Odites sphenidias Meyrick, 1914

Species of moth

Odites sphenidias is a moth in the family Depressariidae. It was described by Edward Meyrick in 1914. It is found in India (Assam).

The wingspan is about 16 mm. The forewings are ochreous whitish with a black dot on the base of the costa, one at the base in the middle, one towards the costa at one-fifth, and one beneath the fold below this. The stigmata are black, the first discal large, the subtriangular plical obliquely beyond the first discal. There is a small triangular blackish spot on the middle of the costa and a strongly curved series of rather large cloudy blackish dots from three-fourths of the costa to the dorsum before the termen, interrupted towards the dorsum. A series of blackish dots is found around the posterior part of the costa and termen, two on the costa about four-fifths enlarged and suffused beneath with fuscous. The hindwings are ochreous whitish.
