= Odites procellosa =

Scientific classification
- Kingdom: Animalia
- Phylum: Arthropoda
- Class: Insecta
- Order: Lepidoptera
- Family: Depressariidae
- Genus: Odites
- Species: O. procellosa

Binomial name
- Odites procellosa Meyrick, 1908

Species of moth

Odites procellosa is a moth in the family Depressariidae. It was described by Edward Meyrick in 1908. It is found in Nigeria.

The wingspan is 17–18 mm. The forewings are whitish ochreous tinged with yellow, thinly and irregularly sprinkled with fuscous. Towards the base is some fuscous suffusion sprinkled with dark fuscous, especially on the costa and dorsum. The stigmata are dark fuscous, the first discal enlarged into a round cloudy rather dark fuscous spot, obliquely above and before which is another dark fuscous dot, the plical obliquely beyond the first discal. There is a suffused fuscous spot on the costa beyond the middle and a curved posterior series of cloudy dots of fuscous and dark fuscous scales. The hindwings are ochreous whitish, faintly fuscous tinged.
