= Odites pragmatias =

Scientific classification
- Kingdom: Animalia
- Phylum: Arthropoda
- Class: Insecta
- Order: Lepidoptera
- Family: Depressariidae
- Genus: Odites
- Species: O. pragmatias

Binomial name
- Odites pragmatias Meyrick, 1914

Species of moth

Odites pragmatias is a moth in the family Depressariidae. It was described by Edward Meyrick in 1914. It is found in southern India.

The wingspan is 17–18 mm. The forewings are whitish, sometimes partially suffused with very pale greyish ochreous, with irregularly scattered blackish scales and with a blackish transverse mark on the base of the costa, and a short suffused blackish streak along the base of the dorsum. The stigmata are black, the plical obliquely beyond the first discal. There is a curved series of four large blackish dots in the disc at five-sixths, and one on the dorsum below the second discal. There is also a series of blackish dots around the posterior part of the costa and termen. The hindwings are pale greyish ochreous.
