= Odites repetita =

Scientific classification
- Kingdom: Animalia
- Phylum: Arthropoda
- Class: Insecta
- Order: Lepidoptera
- Family: Depressariidae
- Genus: Odites
- Species: O. repetita

Binomial name
- Odites repetita Meyrick, 1932

Species of moth

Odites repetita is a moth in the family Depressariidae. It was described by Edward Meyrick in 1932. It is found in Uganda.
