= Odites inconspicua =

Scientific classification
- Kingdom: Animalia
- Phylum: Arthropoda
- Class: Insecta
- Order: Lepidoptera
- Family: Depressariidae
- Genus: Odites
- Species: O. inconspicua

Binomial name
- Odites inconspicua Walsingham, 1891

Species of moth

Odites inconspicua is a moth in the family Depressariidae. It was described by Lord Walsingham in 1891. It is found in the Democratic Republic of the Congo (East Kasai) and Gambia.

The wingspan is about 13 mm. The forewings are unicolorous stone colour with two small darker stone-coloured spots, one on the middle of the wing, the other in the same line with it on the end of the cell. The hindwings are pale stone grey.
