= Odites carcharopa =

Scientific classification
- Kingdom: Animalia
- Phylum: Arthropoda
- Class: Insecta
- Order: Lepidoptera
- Family: Depressariidae
- Genus: Odites
- Species: O. carcharopa

Binomial name
- Odites carcharopa Meyrick, 1914

Species of moth

Odites carcharopa is a moth in the family Depressariidae. It was described by Edward Meyrick in 1914. It is found on the Comoros in the Indian Ocean.

The wingspan is 13–17 mm. The forewings are pale greyish ochreous or whitish ochreous, becoming white towards the costa posteriorly. There is a blackish dot almost on the base of the dorsum, as well as a fuscous blotch on the dorsum before the middle, sometimes reduced to an oblique streak representing its anterior edge, its apex representing the plical stigma. The discal stigmata are dark fuscous, sometimes tinged with orange ochreous. There is a more or less developed transverse fuscous blotch on the dorsum before the tornus, sometimes suffusedly extended to the termen, its anterior angle almost reaching the second discal stigma. There is also a short oblique black strigula from the costa before the middle, and another from the median prominence, giving rise to a more or less developed very oblique orange-ochreous streak. Two or three fine blackish lines are found on the costal portions of the veins towards the apex, and a black mark along the costa at the apex and there are several small indistinct dark fuscous dots on the termen. The hindwings are pale whitish ochreous.
