= Scythropiodes triangulus =

Scientific classification
- Kingdom: Animalia
- Phylum: Arthropoda
- Clade: Pancrustacea
- Class: Insecta
- Order: Lepidoptera
- Family: Lecithoceridae
- Genus: Scythropiodes
- Species: S. triangulus

Binomial name
- Scythropiodes triangulus Park & C. S. Wu, 1997

Species of moth

Scythropiodes triangulus is a moth in the family Lecithoceridae. It was described by Kyu-Tek Park and Chun-Sheng Wu in 1997. It is found in the Chinese provinces of Hainan, Fujian, Guangdong and Jiangxi.

The wingspan is about 23 mm.

== Etymology ==
The species name is derived from Latin curvus (meaning bent).
