= Odites oligectis =

Scientific classification
- Kingdom: Animalia
- Phylum: Arthropoda
- Class: Insecta
- Order: Lepidoptera
- Family: Depressariidae
- Genus: Odites
- Species: O. oligectis

Binomial name
- Odites oligectis Meyrick, 1917

Species of moth

Odites oligectis is a moth in the family Depressariidae. It was described by Edward Meyrick in 1917. It is found in southern India.

The wingspan is about 17 mm. The forewings are whitish fuscous, irregularly irrorated with fuscous, especially towards the dorsum anteriorly and on the veins posteriorly. The costa is finely whitish from the base to three-fourths, the edge blackish towards the base. The stigmata are small and dark fuscous, the plical obliquely beyond the first discal and there is an indistinct streak of dark fuscous suffusion from the second discal stigma to four-fifths of the dorsum. Some scattered dark fuscous scales indicate an angulated series of minute dots from beneath two-thirds of the costa to above the tornus and there is a marginal series of cloudy dark fuscous dots around the apical part of the costa and termen. The hindwings are whitish.
