= Odites atalanta =

Scientific classification
- Kingdom: Animalia
- Phylum: Arthropoda
- Class: Insecta
- Order: Lepidoptera
- Family: Depressariidae
- Genus: Odites
- Species: O. atalanta

Binomial name
- Odites atalanta Le Cerf, 1934

Species of moth

Odites atalanta is a moth in the family Depressariidae. It was described by Ferdinand Le Cerf in 1934. It is found in Morocco.
