= Odites eriopa =

Scientific classification
- Kingdom: Animalia
- Phylum: Arthropoda
- Class: Insecta
- Order: Lepidoptera
- Family: Depressariidae
- Genus: Odites
- Species: O. eriopa

Binomial name
- Odites eriopa Meyrick, 1908

Species of moth

Odites eriopa is a moth in the family Depressariidae. It was described by Edward Meyrick in 1908. It is found in Assam, India.

The wingspan is 16–18 mm. The forewings are whitish ochreous, in males sprinkled with fuscous, in females suffused with a pale pinkish-fuscous tinge and irrorated with dark fuscous. The costal edge is suffused with ochreous yellowish. The discal stigmata are rather large, round and black. The hindwings are ochreous whitish, in males slightly greyish on the margins, in females tinged with light grey throughout.
