= Odites duodaca =

Scientific classification
- Kingdom: Animalia
- Phylum: Arthropoda
- Class: Insecta
- Order: Lepidoptera
- Family: Depressariidae
- Genus: Odites
- Species: O. duodaca

Binomial name
- Odites duodaca Diakonoff, 1948

Species of moth

Odites duodaca is a moth in the family Depressariidae. It was described by Alexey Diakonoff in 1948 from Buru island, Indonesia.

It has a wingspan of 13mm.
