= Odites assidua =

Scientific classification
- Kingdom: Animalia
- Phylum: Arthropoda
- Class: Insecta
- Order: Lepidoptera
- Family: Depressariidae
- Genus: Odites
- Species: O. assidua

Binomial name
- Odites assidua Meyrick, 1914

Species of moth

Odites assidua is a moth in the family Depressariidae. It was described by Edward Meyrick in 1914. It is found in South Africa.

The wingspan is about 18 mm. The forewings are ochreous whitish with the costal edge light ochreous and the discal stigmata minute and black. The hindwings are ochreous whitish.
