= Odites citromela =

Scientific classification
- Kingdom: Animalia
- Phylum: Arthropoda
- Class: Insecta
- Order: Lepidoptera
- Family: Depressariidae
- Genus: Odites
- Species: O. citromela

Binomial name
- Odites citromela Meyrick, 1923

Species of moth

Odites citromela is a moth in the family Depressariidae. It was described by Edward Meyrick in 1923. It is found in Angola.
