= Odites malagasiella =

Scientific classification
- Kingdom: Animalia
- Phylum: Arthropoda
- Class: Insecta
- Order: Lepidoptera
- Family: Depressariidae
- Genus: Odites
- Species: O. malagasiella

Binomial name
- Odites malagasiella Viette, 1967

Species of moth

Odites malagasiella is a moth in the family Depressariidae. It was described by Pierre Viette in 1967. It is found in Madagascar.
