= Odites emensa =

Scientific classification
- Kingdom: Animalia
- Phylum: Arthropoda
- Class: Insecta
- Order: Lepidoptera
- Family: Depressariidae
- Genus: Odites
- Species: O. emensa

Binomial name
- Odites emensa Meyrick, 1921

Species of moth

Odites emensa is a moth in the family Depressariidae. It was described by Edward Meyrick in 1921. It is found in South Africa.

The wingspan is about 19 mm. The forewings are grey whitish, slightly sprinkled with grey and with a small black linear dot towards the costa near the base. The stigmata are black, the plical obliquely beyond the first discal, nearly equally near the second discal. There is a strongly curved subterminal series of small groups of blackish scales and an almost marginal series of black dots around the posterior part of the costa and termen. The hindwings are light grey.
