= Odites atonopa =

Scientific classification
- Kingdom: Animalia
- Phylum: Arthropoda
- Class: Insecta
- Order: Lepidoptera
- Family: Depressariidae
- Genus: Odites
- Species: O. atonopa

Binomial name
- Odites atonopa Meyrick, 1918

Species of moth

Odites atonopa is a moth in the family Depressariidae. It was described by Edward Meyrick in 1918. It is found in north-western India.

The wingspan is about 20 mm. The forewings are whitish ochreous, towards the dorsum faintly greyish tinged and with the extreme costal edge ochreous yellowish, near the base grey. The second discal stigma is cloudy and light grey. The hindwings are light grey.
