= Odites orthometra =

Scientific classification
- Kingdom: Animalia
- Phylum: Arthropoda
- Class: Insecta
- Order: Lepidoptera
- Family: Depressariidae
- Genus: Odites
- Species: O. orthometra

Binomial name
- Odites orthometra Meyrick, 1908

Species of moth

Odites orthometra is a moth in the family Depressariidae. It was described by Edward Meyrick in 1908. It is found in Sri Lanka.

The wingspan is 16–18 mm. The forewings are whitish ochreous, in females tinged with brownish ochreous and irrorated with brownish. The stigmata are blackish, the first discal rather large, the plical obliquely beyond the first discal. There is a strongly curved subterminal series of minute black dots, the central dot enlarged and conspicuous. There is also a series of minute indistinct blackish dots on the posterior part of the costa and termen. The hindwings are pale grey.
