= Odites psilotis =

Scientific classification
- Kingdom: Animalia
- Phylum: Arthropoda
- Class: Insecta
- Order: Lepidoptera
- Family: Depressariidae
- Genus: Odites
- Species: O. psilotis

Binomial name
- Odites psilotis (Meyrick, 1905)

Synonyms
- Xylorycta psilotis Meyrick, 1905

Species of moth

Odites psilotis is a moth in the family Depressariidae. It was described by Edward Meyrick in 1905. It is found in Sri Lanka.

The wingspan is 16–17 mm. The forewings are pale whitish ochreous, thinly scaled. The discal stigmata are indicated by two or three blackish scales, the first sometimes absent. There is an almost marginal series of dark grey or blackish dots along the termen, sometimes little marked. The hindwings are ochreous whitish.
