= Odites analogica =

Scientific classification
- Kingdom: Animalia
- Phylum: Arthropoda
- Class: Insecta
- Order: Lepidoptera
- Family: Depressariidae
- Genus: Odites
- Species: O. analogica

Binomial name
- Odites analogica Meyrick, 1917

Species of moth

Odites analogica is a moth in the family Depressariidae. It was described by Edward Meyrick in 1917. It is found on the Comoros (Anjouan) and the Democratic Republic of the Congo (Katanga, North Kivu).

The wingspan is about 12 mm. The forewings are brownish ochreous. The stigmata are blackish, the plical midway between the first and second discal. There is an acutely angulated series of indistinct small linear blackish dots from three-fifths of the costa to four-fifths of the dorsum, as well as an almost marginal series of blackish dots around the posterior part of the costa and termen. The hindwings are pale grey.

The larvae feed on Coffea species.
