= Odites isocentra =

Scientific classification
- Kingdom: Animalia
- Phylum: Arthropoda
- Class: Insecta
- Order: Lepidoptera
- Family: Depressariidae
- Genus: Odites
- Species: O. isocentra

Binomial name
- Odites isocentra (Meyrick, 1906)

Synonyms
- Myriopleura isocentra Meyrick, 1906

Species of moth

Odites isocentra is a moth in the family Depressariidae. It was described by Edward Meyrick in 1906. It is found in Sri Lanka.

The wingspan is 11–12 mm. The forewings are whitish ochreous, tinged with yellowish. The discal stigmata are moderate, dark fuscous or blackish and strongly marked. There is a series of cloudy dark fuscous dots along the posterior part of the costa and termen. The hindwings are ochreous whitish.
