= Odites artigena =

Scientific classification
- Kingdom: Animalia
- Phylum: Arthropoda
- Class: Insecta
- Order: Lepidoptera
- Family: Depressariidae
- Genus: Odites
- Species: O. artigena

Binomial name
- Odites artigena (Meyrick, 1914)

Synonyms
- Xylorycta artigena Meyrick, 1914

Species of moth

Odites artigena is a moth in the family Depressariidae. It was described by Edward Meyrick in 1914. It is found in South Africa and Kenya.

The wingspan is 13–14 mm. The forewings are white with the costal edge blackish towards the base and with a patch of faint whitish-ochreous suffusion on the basal portion of dorsum. There are black dots at both angles of the cell, followed by a brown patch, and connected with the tornus by an irregular interrupted line of brown suffusion sprinkled with black. There is a faint irregular line of brownish suffusion with some dots of black irroration running near the margin around the posterior two-fifths of the costa and termen. There is also a terminal row of small black dots. The hindwings are white, with a faint ochreous tinge.

The larvae feed on Coffea arabica and Persea americana.
