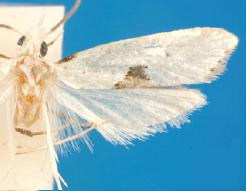
- Male

Scientific classification
- Domain: Eukaryota
- Kingdom: Animalia
- Phylum: Arthropoda
- Class: Insecta
- Order: Lepidoptera
- Family: Yponomeutidae
- Genus: Eucalantica
- Species: E. pumila

Binomial name
- Eucalantica pumila Sohn, 2011

= Eucalantica pumila =

Species of moth

Eucalantica pumila is a moth in the family Yponomeutidae. It is found in Costa Rica (Heredia, Barva Volcano).

The length of the forewings is about 5.8 mm.

== Etymology ==
The specific epithet is derived from the Latin pumilus (meaning little) and refers to its small size relative to other Eucalantica species.
