= Scythropiodes ussuriella =

Scientific classification
- Kingdom: Animalia
- Phylum: Arthropoda
- Clade: Pancrustacea
- Class: Insecta
- Order: Lepidoptera
- Family: Lecithoceridae
- Genus: Scythropiodes
- Species: S. ussuriella

Binomial name
- Scythropiodes ussuriella Lvovsky, 1996

Species of moth

Scythropiodes ussuriella is a moth in the family Lecithoceridae. It was described by Alexandr L. Lvovsky in 1996. It is found in Korea and the Russian Far East (south-eastern Siberia).
