= Odites holocitra =

Scientific classification
- Kingdom: Animalia
- Phylum: Arthropoda
- Class: Insecta
- Order: Lepidoptera
- Family: Depressariidae
- Genus: Odites
- Species: O. holocitra

Binomial name
- Odites holocitra Meyrick, 1925

Species of moth

Odites holocitra are moths in the family Depressariidae. It was described by Edward Meyrick in 1925. They are found in Cameroon.

The wingspan is about 31 mm. The forewings are pale lemon yellow and the hindwings are yellow whitish.
