= Scythropiodes oncinius =

Scientific classification
- Kingdom: Animalia
- Phylum: Arthropoda
- Clade: Pancrustacea
- Class: Insecta
- Order: Lepidoptera
- Family: Lecithoceridae
- Genus: Scythropiodes
- Species: S. oncinius

Binomial name
- Scythropiodes oncinius Park & C. S. Wu, 1997

Species of moth

Scythropiodes oncinius is a moth in the family Lecithoceridae. It was described by Kyu-Tek Park and Chun-Sheng Wu in 1997. It is found in Hainan, China.

The wingspan is 15–17 mm.

== Etymology ==
The species name is derived from Greek onkinos (meaning a hook).
