= Odites laconica =

Scientific classification
- Kingdom: Animalia
- Phylum: Arthropoda
- Clade: Pancrustacea
- Class: Insecta
- Order: Lepidoptera
- Family: Depressariidae
- Genus: Odites
- Species: O. laconica

Binomial name
- Odites laconica Meyrick, 1927

Species of moth

Odites laconica is a moth in the family Depressariidae. It was described by Edward Meyrick in 1927. It is found in South Africa.

The wingspan is about 19 mm. The forewings are white with the costal edge pale yellowish. There are two or three small black marks or dots just before the margin around the apex. The hindwings are pale whitish ochreous.
