= Odites glaphyra =

Scientific classification
- Kingdom: Animalia
- Phylum: Arthropoda
- Class: Insecta
- Order: Lepidoptera
- Family: Depressariidae
- Genus: Odites
- Species: O. glaphyra

Binomial name
- Odites glaphyra Meyrick, 1908

Species of moth

Odites glaphyra is a moth in the family Depressariidae. It was described by Edward Meyrick in 1908. It is found in India (Sikkim).

The wingspan is about 26 mm. The forewings are pale brownish ochreous, with some scattered dark fuscous specks and with the extreme costal edge blackish towards the base. The stigmata are small and blackish, the plical obliquely beyond the first discal. There is an angulated subterminal series of indistinct dark fuscous dots, terminating in a cloudy dark fuscous pre-tornal spot and there is also a terminal series of blackish dots. The hindwings are ochreous whitish.
