= Odites consignata =

Scientific classification
- Kingdom: Animalia
- Phylum: Arthropoda
- Class: Insecta
- Order: Lepidoptera
- Family: Depressariidae
- Genus: Odites
- Species: O. consignata

Binomial name
- Odites consignata Meyrick, 1921

Species of moth

Odites consignata is a moth in the family Depressariidae. It was described by Edward Meyrick in 1921. It is found in South Africa, where it has been recorded from KwaZulu-Natal.

The wingspan is about 20 mm. The forewings are ochreous white with the discal stigmata small and blackish, a faint cloudy spot of grey irroration (sprinkles) beneath the second. There is an almost marginal series of blackish dots around the apex and termen. The hindwings are ochreous white.
