= Odites concava =

Scientific classification
- Kingdom: Animalia
- Phylum: Arthropoda
- Clade: Pancrustacea
- Class: Insecta
- Order: Lepidoptera
- Family: Depressariidae
- Genus: Odites
- Species: O. concava

Binomial name
- Odites concava Meyrick, 1922

Species of moth

Odites concava is a moth in the family Depressariidae. It was described by Edward Meyrick in 1922. It is found on Java in Indonesia.

The wingspan is about 20 mm. The forewings are light ochreous, slightly brownish tinged. The discal stigmata are minute and rather dark fuscous. There is a curved subterminal series of small groups of rather dark fuscous scales becoming obsolete towards the margins. The hindwings are pale grey, tinged with ochreous whitish anteriorly and with an inwards-oblique mark of dark grey suffusion from the posterior edge of the concavity. The terminal edge is suffused with dark grey around the apex.
