= Odites anasticta =

Scientific classification
- Kingdom: Animalia
- Phylum: Arthropoda
- Class: Insecta
- Order: Lepidoptera
- Family: Depressariidae
- Genus: Odites
- Species: O. anasticta

Binomial name
- Odites anasticta Meyrick, 1930

Species of moth

Odites anasticta is a moth in the family Depressariidae. It was described by Edward Meyrick in 1930. It is found in Madagascar.
