= Odites agathopella =

Scientific classification
- Kingdom: Animalia
- Phylum: Arthropoda
- Class: Insecta
- Order: Lepidoptera
- Family: Depressariidae
- Genus: Odites
- Species: O. agathopella

Binomial name
- Odites agathopella Viette, 1968

Species of moth

Odites agathopella is a moth in the family Depressariidae. It was described by Pierre Viette in 1968. It is found in Madagascar.
