= Odites diacentra =

Scientific classification
- Kingdom: Animalia
- Phylum: Arthropoda
- Class: Insecta
- Order: Lepidoptera
- Family: Depressariidae
- Genus: Odites
- Species: O. diacentra

Binomial name
- Odites diacentra Meyrick, 1921

Species of moth

Odites diacentra is a moth in the family Depressariidae. It was described by Edward Meyrick in 1921. It is found on Java.

The wingspan is about 21 mm. The forewings are pale yellow ochreous. The discal stigmata are moderate, blackish and remote. The hindwings are whitish ochreous.
