= Odites ricini =

Scientific classification
- Kingdom: Animalia
- Phylum: Arthropoda
- Clade: Pancrustacea
- Class: Insecta
- Order: Lepidoptera
- Family: Depressariidae
- Genus: Odites
- Species: O. ricini

Binomial name
- Odites ricini (Stainton, 1859)

Synonyms
- Depressaria ricini Stainton, 1859

Species of moth

Odites ricini is a moth in the family Depressariidae. It was described by Henry Tibbats Stainton in 1859. It is found in India.

The forewings are pale sulphur yellow, with the costa narrowly orange from before the middle to the apex. On the inner margin near the base is a faint pale grey cloud, and on the disc beyond the middle is a very indistinct grey dot. A row of grey dots runs along the hind margin. The hindwings are whitish.

The larvae feed on Ricinus communis, rolling up the edge of a leaf. They are green with a black head.
