= Saridoscelinae =

Scientific classification
- Kingdom: Animalia
- Phylum: Arthropoda
- Class: Insecta
- Order: Lepidoptera
- Family: Yponomeutidae
- Subfamily: Saridoscelinae; Moriuti, 1977

Subfamily of moths

Saridoscelinae is a subfamily of moths of the family Yponomeutidae.

== Genera ==
- Saridoscelis Meyrick, 1894
- Eucalantica Busck, 1904
