= Odites praefixa =

Scientific classification
- Kingdom: Animalia
- Phylum: Arthropoda
- Class: Insecta
- Order: Lepidoptera
- Family: Depressariidae
- Genus: Odites
- Species: O. praefixa

Binomial name
- Odites praefixa Meyrick, 1921

Species of moth

Odites praefixa is a moth in the family Depressariidae. It was described by Edward Meyrick in 1921. It is found on Java.

The wingspan is about 16 mm. The forewings are ochreous whitish. The stigmata are small and blackish, the plical obliquely beyond the first discal, the second discal larger, somewhat transverse. There is a pre-marginal series of blackish dots around the posterior part of the costa and termen. The hindwings are ochreous whitish.
