= Odites arenella =

Scientific classification
- Kingdom: Animalia
- Phylum: Arthropoda
- Class: Insecta
- Order: Lepidoptera
- Family: Depressariidae
- Genus: Odites
- Species: O. arenella

Binomial name
- Odites arenella Legrand, 1966

Species of moth

Odites arenella is a moth in the family Depressariidae. It was described by Henry Legrand in 1966. It is found on Aldabra in the Seychelles.
