= Odites homocirrha =

Scientific classification
- Kingdom: Animalia
- Phylum: Arthropoda
- Class: Insecta
- Order: Lepidoptera
- Family: Depressariidae
- Genus: Odites
- Species: O. homocirrha

Binomial name
- Odites homocirrha Diakonoff, [1968]

Species of moth

Odites homocirrha is a moth in the family Depressariidae. It was described by Alexey Diakonoff in 1968. It is found on Luzon in the Philippines.
