= Odites meloxantha =

Scientific classification
- Kingdom: Animalia
- Phylum: Arthropoda
- Class: Insecta
- Order: Lepidoptera
- Family: Depressariidae
- Genus: Odites
- Species: O. meloxantha

Binomial name
- Odites meloxantha Meyrick, 1927

Species of moth

Odites meloxantha is a moth in the family Depressariidae. It was described by Edward Meyrick in 1927. It is found in Zimbabwe.

The wingspan is about 17 mm. The forewings are ochreous yellow, rather deeper towards the base. The stigmata are black, the plical minute, obliquely beyond the first discal. There is a pre-marginal series of small grey dots around the apex and termen to the dorsum before the tornus. The hindwings are whitish ochreous.
