= Odites atmopa =

Scientific classification
- Kingdom: Animalia
- Phylum: Arthropoda
- Class: Insecta
- Order: Lepidoptera
- Family: Depressariidae
- Genus: Odites
- Species: O. atmopa

Binomial name
- Odites atmopa Meyrick, 1914

Species of moth

Odites atmopa is a moth in the family Depressariidae. It was described by Edward Meyrick in 1914. It is found in Sri Lanka.

The wingspan is 26–27 mm. The forewings are whitish ochreous with the costal edge ochreous except towards the base and with the discal stigmata minute and blackish, the second immediately followed by a pale grey cloudy spot. There is a curved subterminal series of a very few grey scales and a terminal series of cloudy blackish-grey dots. The hindwings are yellow whitish.
