= Odites consecrata =

Scientific classification
- Kingdom: Animalia
- Phylum: Arthropoda
- Class: Insecta
- Order: Lepidoptera
- Family: Depressariidae
- Genus: Odites
- Species: O. consecrata

Binomial name
- Odites consecrata Meyrick, 1917

Species of moth

Odites consecrata is a moth in the family Depressariidae. It was described by Edward Meyrick in 1917. It is found in Madagascar.

The wingspan is about 15 mm. The forewings are glossy whitish-grey ochreous, the costa suffused with whitish from the base to three-fourths. The hindwings are ochreous whitish.
