= Odites heptasticta =

Scientific classification
- Kingdom: Animalia
- Phylum: Arthropoda
- Class: Insecta
- Order: Lepidoptera
- Family: Depressariidae
- Genus: Odites
- Species: O. heptasticta

Binomial name
- Odites heptasticta Meyrick, 1914

Species of moth

Odites heptasticta is a moth in the family Depressariidae. It was described by Edward Meyrick in 1914. It is found in Malawi.

The wingspan is about 18 mm. The forewings are whitish ochreous with the costal edge more ochreous tinged, the extreme edge greyish. There is a minute black dot at the base in the middle. In females, there are two or three additional black specks towards the costa and dorsum at one-fourth. The stigmata are minute and black, in females larger, the plical obliquely beyond the first discal. There are small black dots near the costa at three-fourths, near the dorsum beneath this, and towards the termen in the middle. There is also a series of minute blackish dots along the termen. The hindwings are pale whitish ochreous.
