= Odites choricopa =

Scientific classification
- Kingdom: Animalia
- Phylum: Arthropoda
- Class: Insecta
- Order: Lepidoptera
- Family: Depressariidae
- Genus: Odites
- Species: O. choricopa

Binomial name
- Odites choricopa Meyrick, 1931

Species of moth

Odites choricopa is a moth in the family Depressariidae. It was described by Edward Meyrick in 1931. It is found in China.
