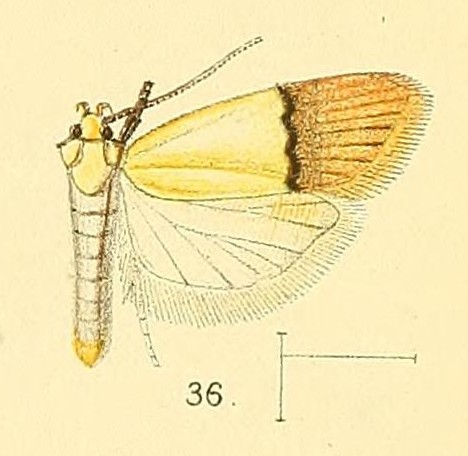

Scientific classification
- Kingdom: Animalia
- Phylum: Arthropoda
- Class: Insecta
- Order: Lepidoptera
- Family: Depressariidae
- Genus: Odites
- Species: O. natalensis

Binomial name
- Odites natalensis Walsingham, 1891

= Odites natalensis =

Species of moth

Odites natalensis is a moth in the family Depressariidae. It was described by Lord Walsingham in 1891. It is found in the Republic of the Congo, the Democratic Republic of the Congo (Katanga), Malawi, Mozambique, South Africa (KwaZulu-Natal), Tanzania and Zimbabwe.

The wingspan is about 17 mm. The forewings are pale straw yellow to beyond the middle, slightly shaded with brown on the extreme costal margin near the base. Beyond the middle is a slightly-waved transverse purplish fuscous line, beyond which the remainder of the wing is entirely shaded with pale brown, or brownish ochreous. The hindwings are very pale greyish ochreous.
