= Odites atomosperma =

Scientific classification
- Kingdom: Animalia
- Phylum: Arthropoda
- Class: Insecta
- Order: Lepidoptera
- Family: Depressariidae
- Genus: Odites
- Species: O. atomosperma

Binomial name
- Odites atomosperma Meyrick, 1933

Species of moth

Odites atomosperma is a moth in the Depressariidae family. It was described by Edward Meyrick in 1933. It is endemic to Madagascar.

The wingspan is 13–16 mm (0.51–0.63 in).
