= Odites practoria =

Scientific classification
- Kingdom: Animalia
- Phylum: Arthropoda
- Class: Insecta
- Order: Lepidoptera
- Family: Depressariidae
- Genus: Odites
- Species: O. practoria

Binomial name
- Odites practoria Meyrick, 1908

Species of moth

Odites practoria is a moth in the family Depressariidae. It was described by Edward Meyrick in 1908. It is found in Assam, India.

The wingspan is 15–18 mm. The forewings are whitish ochreous, more or less sprinkled with fuscous and a few black scales. There is a black basal dot in the middle, and the base of the costa is black. There is also a black dot beneath the costa at one-fourth. The stigmata are small and black, the plical obliquely beyond the first discal and there is a triangular blackish spot on the costa before the middle, as well as three small spots of dark fuscous suffusion on the costa posteriorly, from the first of which proceeds an angulated or strongly curved series of small spots of dark fuscous irroration to the dorsum before the tornus. There is also a terminal series of black dots. The hindwings are ochreous whitish, in females slightly tinged with grey.
