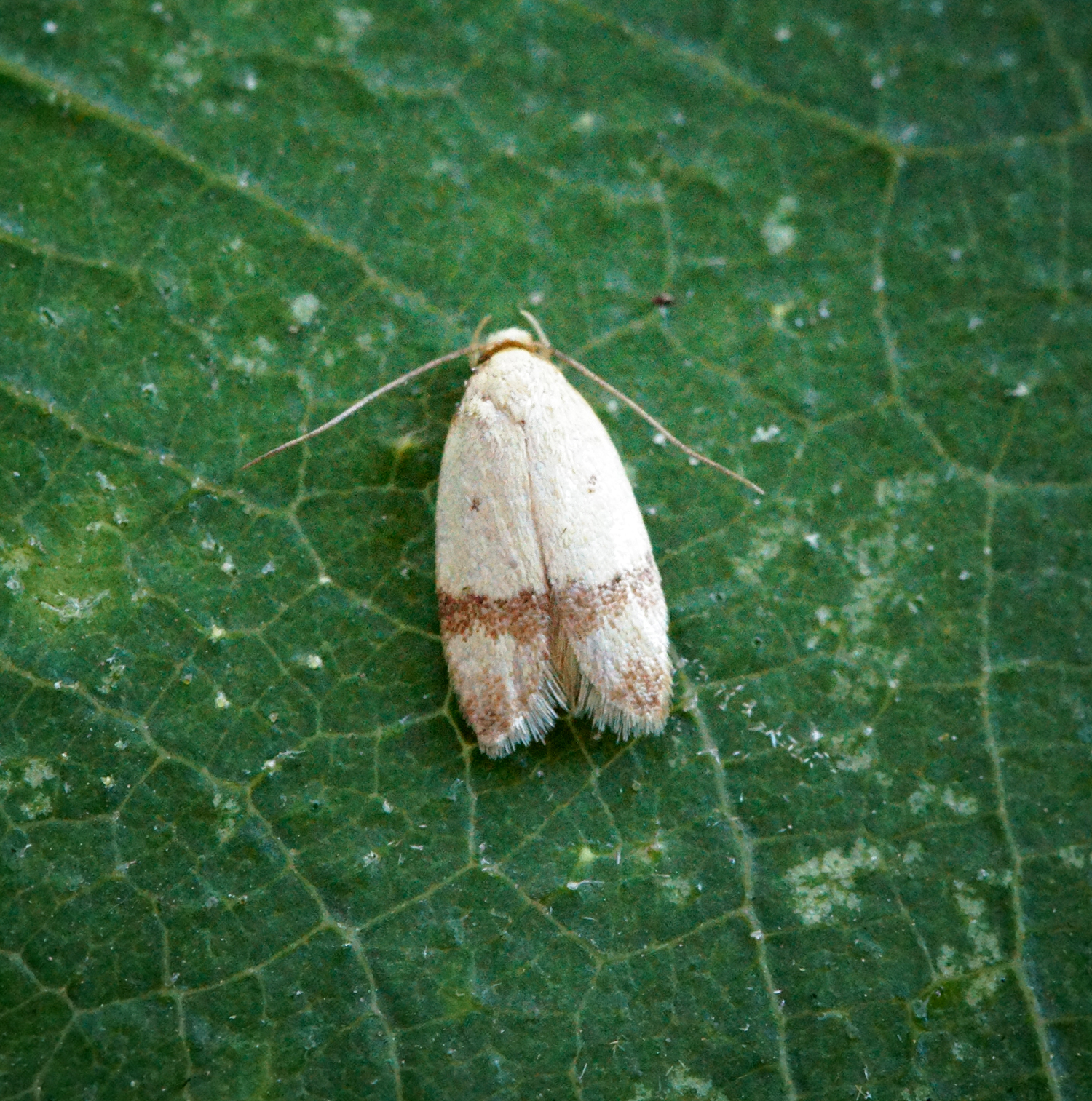

Scientific classification
- Kingdom: Animalia
- Phylum: Arthropoda
- Clade: Pancrustacea
- Class: Insecta
- Order: Lepidoptera
- Family: Depressariidae
- Genus: Odites
- Species: O. kollarella

Binomial name
- Odites kollarella (O. Costa, 1832)

Synonyms
- Tinea kollarella Costa, [1836]; Tortrix walkenaerana Duponchel, 1835; Lita luteella Duponchel, 1840; Nothris flavedinella Heydenreich, 1851

= Odites kollarella =

Species of moth

Odites kollarella is a moth in the family Depressariidae. It was described by Oronzio Gabriele Costa in 1832. It is found in Portugal, Spain, France, Italy, Croatia, Moldova and Greece, as well as on Corsica.

The wingspan is about 12.5 mm.
