= Odites nubeculosa =

Scientific classification
- Kingdom: Animalia
- Phylum: Arthropoda
- Class: Insecta
- Order: Lepidoptera
- Family: Depressariidae
- Genus: Odites
- Species: O. nubeculosa

Binomial name
- Odites nubeculosa Meyrick, 1918

Species of moth

Odites nubeculosa is a moth in the family Depressariidae. It was described by Edward Meyrick in 1918. It is found in South Africa.

The wingspan is about 26 mm. The forewings are fuscous whitish, irregularly scattered with dark fuscous specks except towards the costa. The discal stigmata are black, with a cloudy fuscous spot beneath and slightly beyond the second. There are cloudy dots of suffused dark fuscous scales along the termen. The hindwings are whitish.
