= Odites brachyclista =

Scientific classification
- Kingdom: Animalia
- Phylum: Arthropoda
- Class: Insecta
- Order: Lepidoptera
- Family: Depressariidae
- Genus: Odites
- Species: O. brachyclista

Binomial name
- Odites brachyclista Meyrick, 1928

Species of moth

Odites brachyclista is a moth in the family Depressariidae. It was described by Edward Meyrick in 1928. It is found in the Philippines (Luzon).

== Description ==
The wingspan is about 22 mm. The forewings are pale whitish ochreous, with some scattered fuscous specks and a dark fuscous dot near the base in the middle. The discal stigmata are dark fuscous, the first rather small, near beyond the preceding, the second larger, the plical indistinct and grey, obliquely beyond the first discal (all these unusually near the base). There is a strongly angulated transverse series of indistinct groups of grey or dark grey specks from beneath the costa at two-thirds to above the dorsum at three-fourths. There is a terminal series of minute blackish dots on the veins. The hindwings are white.
