= Odites fruticosa =

Scientific classification
- Kingdom: Animalia
- Phylum: Arthropoda
- Class: Insecta
- Order: Lepidoptera
- Family: Depressariidae
- Genus: Odites
- Species: O. fruticosa

Binomial name
- Odites fruticosa Meyrick, 1915

Species of moth

Odites fruticosa is a moth in the family Depressariidae. It was described by Edward Meyrick in 1915. It is found in India.

The wingspan is about 17 mm. The forewings are ochreous whitish with the costal edge suffused with fuscous and with a dark fuscous line along the upper margin of the cell, in the middle of the wing enlarged into an irregular elongate blotch which extends around the posterior margin of the cell to its lower angle. The first discal stigma is blackish, extended by a dark fuscous linear mark posteriorly, the second discal stigma is represented by two transversely placed blackish dots on the margin of this blotch. There is an oblique wedge-shaped dark fuscous blotch from the dorsum at one-fourth, the dorsal area between this and the tornus suffusedly infuscated. There is also an irregular fuscous streak from the middle of the costa running beneath the costa almost to the apex and the veins between the cell and termen are marked with fuscous lines. A connected series of dark fuscous dots is found around the apex and termen. The hindwings are ochreous whitish.
