= Odites sphaerophyes =

Scientific classification
- Kingdom: Animalia
- Phylum: Arthropoda
- Class: Insecta
- Order: Lepidoptera
- Family: Depressariidae
- Genus: Odites
- Species: O. sphaerophyes

Binomial name
- Odites sphaerophyes Diakonoff, 1966

Species of moth

Odites sphaerophyes is a moth in the family Depressariidae. It was described by Alexey Diakonoff in 1966. It is found on Sulawesi.
