= Odites tsaraella =

Scientific classification
- Kingdom: Animalia
- Phylum: Arthropoda
- Class: Insecta
- Order: Lepidoptera
- Family: Depressariidae
- Genus: Odites
- Species: O. tsaraella

Binomial name
- Odites tsaraella Viette, 1986

Species of moth

Odites tsaraella is a moth in the family Depressariidae. It was described by Pierre Viette in 1986. It is found in Madagascar.
