= Odites collega =

Scientific classification
- Kingdom: Animalia
- Phylum: Arthropoda
- Class: Insecta
- Order: Lepidoptera
- Family: Depressariidae
- Genus: Odites
- Species: O. collega

Binomial name
- Odites collega Meyrick, 1927

Species of moth

Odites collega is a moth in the family Depressariidae. It was described by Edward Meyrick in 1927. It is found in China.

The wingspan is about 23 mm. The forewings are white with the stigmata black, the plical obliquely beyond the first discal. There is a dot of blackish irroration beneath the costa before the middle, and a strongly curved series of similar dots from beneath the costa at two-thirds to the dorsum towards the tornus. A marginal series of blackish dots is found around the apex and termen. The hindwings are grey.
