= Odites hemipercna =

Scientific classification
- Kingdom: Animalia
- Phylum: Arthropoda
- Class: Insecta
- Order: Lepidoptera
- Family: Depressariidae
- Genus: Odites
- Species: O. hemipercna

Binomial name
- Odites hemipercna Meyrick, 1914

Species of moth

Odites hemipercna is a moth in the family Depressariidae. It was described by Edward Meyrick in 1914, and is found in Malawi.

The wingspan is about 10 mm. The forewings are whitish ochreous, with yellowish tinged margins and with a wedge-shaped dark fuscous mark on the base of the costa. The first discal stigma is small and dark fuscous. There is a moderate brownish fascia from two-thirds of the costa to the tornus, edged with dark fuscous anteriorly, suffused posteriorly. There is also some fuscous irroration in the apex and along the termen. The hindwings are light grey.
