= Odites holotorna =

Scientific classification
- Kingdom: Animalia
- Phylum: Arthropoda
- Clade: Pancrustacea
- Class: Insecta
- Order: Lepidoptera
- Family: Depressariidae
- Genus: Odites
- Species: O. holotorna

Binomial name
- Odites holotorna Meyrick, 1925

Species of moth

Odites holotorna is a moth in the family Depressariidae. It was described by Edward Meyrick in 1925. It is found in Cameroon.

The wingspan is about 26 millimetres (1.0 in). The forewings are white, in certain lights with faint grey tinge. The first discal stigma is minute and dark grey, the second obsolete. The hindwings are ochreous whitish.
