= Odites swinhoei =

Scientific classification
- Kingdom: Animalia
- Phylum: Arthropoda
- Class: Insecta
- Order: Lepidoptera
- Family: Depressariidae
- Genus: Odites
- Species: O. swinhoei

Binomial name
- Odites swinhoei (Butler, 1883)

Synonyms
- Depressaria swinhoei Butler, 1883

Species of moth

Odites swinhoei is a moth in the family Depressariidae. It was described by Arthur Gardiner Butler in 1883. It is found in India.

The wingspan is about 16 mm. Adults are stramineous (straw coloured), the forewings have two black dots placed longitudinally and slightly obliquely, in and at the end of the discoidal cell. There is a curved marginal series of dusky dots. The hindwings have the basi-abdominal half whitish.
