= Odites johannae =

Scientific classification
- Kingdom: Animalia
- Phylum: Arthropoda
- Class: Insecta
- Order: Lepidoptera
- Family: Depressariidae
- Genus: Odites
- Species: O. johannae

Binomial name
- Odites johannae Viette, 1987

Species of moth

Odites johannae is a moth in the family Depressariidae. It was described by Pierre Viette in 1987. It is found in the Afrotropical realm.
