= Odites crocota =

Scientific classification
- Kingdom: Animalia
- Phylum: Arthropoda
- Class: Insecta
- Order: Lepidoptera
- Family: Depressariidae
- Genus: Odites
- Species: O. crocota

Binomial name
- Odites crocota Meyrick, 1912

Species of moth

Odites crocota is a moth in the family Depressariidae. It was described by Edward Meyrick in 1912. It is found in South Africa.

The wingspan is about 21 mm. The forewings are whitish yellowish with the second discal stigma blackish. The hindwings are whitish.
