= Odites insons =

Scientific classification
- Kingdom: Animalia
- Phylum: Arthropoda
- Class: Insecta
- Order: Lepidoptera
- Family: Depressariidae
- Genus: Odites
- Species: O. insons

Binomial name
- Odites insons Meyrick, 1912

Species of moth

Odites insons is a moth in the family Depressariidae. It was described by Edward Meyrick in 1912. It is found in the Democratic Republic of the Congo (Katanga) and South Africa (KwaZulu-Natal).

The wingspan is about 18 mm. Adults are wholly ochreous whitish.
