= Scythropiodes tribula =

Scientific classification
- Kingdom: Animalia
- Phylum: Arthropoda
- Clade: Pancrustacea
- Class: Insecta
- Order: Lepidoptera
- Family: Lecithoceridae
- Genus: Scythropiodes
- Species: S. tribula

Binomial name
- Scythropiodes tribula (C. S. Wu, 1997)

Synonyms
- Odites tribula C. S. Wu, 1997

Species of moth

Scythropiodes tribula is a moth in the family Lecithoceridae. It was described by Chun-Sheng Wu in 1997. It is found in the Chinese provinces of Sichuan and Hubei.

The wingspan is about 17 mm.
