= Odites periscias =

Scientific classification
- Kingdom: Animalia
- Phylum: Arthropoda
- Class: Insecta
- Order: Lepidoptera
- Family: Depressariidae
- Genus: Odites
- Species: O. periscias

Binomial name
- Odites periscias Meyrick, 1928

Species of insect

Odites periscias is a moth in the family Depressariidae. It was described by Edward Meyrick in 1928. It is found in the Philippines (Luzon).
