= Odites idonea =

Scientific classification
- Kingdom: Animalia
- Phylum: Arthropoda
- Class: Insecta
- Order: Lepidoptera
- Family: Depressariidae
- Genus: Odites
- Species: O. idonea

Binomial name
- Odites idonea Meyrick, 1925

Species of moth

Odites idonea is a moth in the family Depressariidae. It was described by Edward Meyrick in 1925. It is found in China.
