= Odites aspasta =

Scientific classification
- Kingdom: Animalia
- Phylum: Arthropoda
- Class: Insecta
- Order: Lepidoptera
- Family: Depressariidae
- Genus: Odites
- Species: O. aspasta

Binomial name
- Odites aspasta Meyrick, 1908

Species of moth

Odites aspasta is a moth in the family Depressariidae. It was described by Edward Meyrick in 1908. It is found in India (Assam).

The wingspan is 23–24 mm. The forewings are light yellow ochreous, sometimes partially finely sprinkled with light fuscous and sometimes with a small black dot beneath the costa at one-fourth. The stigmata are blackish, the discal rather large, the plical minute, obliquely beyond the first discal. There is an angulated subterminal series of small undefined spots of blackish irroration, as well as a terminal series of black dots. The hindwings are whitish grey, with indications of a dark terminal dot.
