= Odites balsamias =

Scientific classification
- Kingdom: Animalia
- Phylum: Arthropoda
- Class: Insecta
- Order: Lepidoptera
- Family: Depressariidae
- Genus: Odites
- Species: O. balsamias

Binomial name
- Odites balsamias Meyrick, 1911

Species of moth

Odites balsamias is a moth in the family Depressariidae. It was described by Edward Meyrick in 1911. It is found in South Africa.

The wingspan is about 17 mm. The forewings are yellow whitish, the veins faintly yellower and the costal edge pale fulvous ochreous. The hindwings are pale whitish ochreous tinged with grey.
