= Odites armilligera =

Scientific classification
- Kingdom: Animalia
- Phylum: Arthropoda
- Class: Insecta
- Order: Lepidoptera
- Family: Depressariidae
- Genus: Odites
- Species: O. armilligera

Binomial name
- Odites armilligera Meyrick, 1922

Species of moth

Odites armilligera is a moth in the family Depressariidae. It was described by Edward Meyrick in 1922. It is found in Tanzania.

The wingspan is 11–12 mm. The forewings are pale ochreous, irregularly sprinkled with fuscous and dark fuscous. The discal stigmata are rather large and black. There is an almost marginal series of rather large blackish dots around the posterior part of the costa and termen to before the tornus. The hindwings are ochreous whitish.
