= Odites diopta =

Scientific classification
- Kingdom: Animalia
- Phylum: Arthropoda
- Class: Insecta
- Order: Lepidoptera
- Family: Depressariidae
- Genus: Odites
- Species: O. diopta

Binomial name
- Odites diopta Meyrick, 1917

Species of moth

Odites diopta is a moth in the family Depressariidae. It was described by Edward Meyrick in 1917. It is found in the Central African Republic.

The wingspan is about 12 mm. The forewings are pale yellow ochreous. The discal stigmata are large and black and there is an almost marginal series of small blackish dots around the posterior part of the costa and termen. The hindwings are ochreous whitish.
