= Odites venusta =

Scientific classification
- Kingdom: Animalia
- Phylum: Arthropoda
- Class: Insecta
- Order: Lepidoptera
- Family: Depressariidae
- Genus: Odites
- Species: O. venusta

Binomial name
- Odites venusta Moriuti, 1977

Species of moth

Odites venusta is a moth in the family Depressariidae and superfamily Gelechioidea. It was described by Sigeru Moriuti in 1977. It is found in Japan.
