= Odites semibrunnea =

Scientific classification
- Kingdom: Animalia
- Phylum: Arthropoda
- Class: Insecta
- Order: Lepidoptera
- Family: Depressariidae
- Genus: Odites
- Species: O. semibrunnea

Binomial name
- Odites semibrunnea Bradley, 1958

Species of moth

Odites semibrunnea is a moth in the family Depressariidae. It was described by John David Bradley in 1958 and is found in Kenya.

The larvae feed on Coffea arabica.
