= Odites sucinea =

Scientific classification
- Kingdom: Animalia
- Phylum: Arthropoda
- Class: Insecta
- Order: Lepidoptera
- Family: Depressariidae
- Genus: Odites
- Species: O. sucinea

Binomial name
- Odites sucinea Meyrick, 1915

Species of moth

Odites sucinea is a moth in the family Depressariidae. It was described by Edward Meyrick in 1915. It is found in Mozambique and South Africa.

The wingspan is about 24 mm. The forewings are whitish yellow with the costal edge fulvous ochreous. The hindwings are pale whitish ochreous.
