= Odites hemigymna =

Scientific classification
- Kingdom: Animalia
- Phylum: Arthropoda
- Class: Insecta
- Order: Lepidoptera
- Family: Depressariidae
- Genus: Odites
- Species: O. hemigymna

Binomial name
- Odites hemigymna Meyrick, 1930

Synonyms
- Odites hemigyna

Species of moth

Odites hemigymna is a moth in the family Depressariidae. It was described by Edward Meyrick in 1930. It is found in Madagascar.
