= Odites superscripta =

Scientific classification
- Kingdom: Animalia
- Phylum: Arthropoda
- Class: Insecta
- Order: Lepidoptera
- Family: Depressariidae
- Genus: Odites
- Species: O. superscripta

Binomial name
- Odites superscripta Meyrick, 1926

Species of moth

Odites superscripta is a moth in the family Depressariidae. It was described by Edward Meyrick in 1926. It is found in Namibia, Southern Africa.
