= Odites diakonoffi =

Scientific classification
- Kingdom: Animalia
- Phylum: Arthropoda
- Class: Insecta
- Order: Lepidoptera
- Family: Depressariidae
- Genus: Odites
- Species: O. diakonoffi

Binomial name
- Odites diakonoffi Kuznetsov & Arutjunova, 1991

Species of moth

Odites diakonoffi is a moth in the family Depressariidae. It was described by Vladimir Ivanovitsch Kuznetsov and N. V. Arutjunova in 1991. It is found in Kazakhstan.
