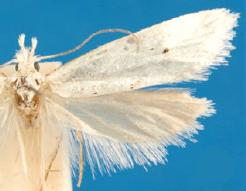
- Female

Scientific classification
- Domain: Eukaryota
- Kingdom: Animalia
- Phylum: Arthropoda
- Class: Insecta
- Order: Lepidoptera
- Family: Yponomeutidae
- Genus: Eucalantica
- Species: E. vaquero

Binomial name
- Eucalantica vaquero Sohn, 2011

= Eucalantica vaquero =

Species of moth

Eucalantica vaquero is a moth in the family Yponomeutidae. It is found in the United States (New Mexico and Arizona) and Mexico.

The length of the forewings is 7.5–8 mm.
