= Odites pancyclia =

Scientific classification
- Kingdom: Animalia
- Phylum: Arthropoda
- Class: Insecta
- Order: Lepidoptera
- Family: Depressariidae
- Genus: Odites
- Species: O. pancyclia

Binomial name
- Odites pancyclia Meyrick, 1928

Species of moth

Odites pancyclia is a moth in the family Depressariidae. It was described by Edward Meyrick in 1928. It is found on Luzon in the Philippines.
