= Odites bambusae =

Scientific classification
- Kingdom: Animalia
- Phylum: Arthropoda
- Class: Insecta
- Order: Lepidoptera
- Family: Depressariidae
- Genus: Odites
- Species: O. bambusae

Binomial name
- Odites bambusae Walsingham, 1900

Species of moth

Odites bambusae is a moth in the family Depressariidae. It was described by Lord Walsingham in 1900. It is found in southern India.

The wingspan is about 24 mm. The forewings are pale fawn, with two small fuscous spots on the disc before the middle, of which the lower is nearer the base than the upper, a third spot at the end of the cell preceded by a smaller one a little above and before it. There is a brownish shade across the apical veins reverting towards the middle of the costa and downwards parallel with the termen to the dorsum, which it follows to the base. Around the termen and apex is a series of fuscous dots, about eight in number. The hindwings are shining whitish.

The larvae roll the leaves of bamboo. They are pale green, naked, smooth and more than 25 mm long.
