= Thecobathra =

Scientific classification
- Kingdom: Animalia
- Phylum: Arthropoda
- Class: Insecta
- Order: Lepidoptera
- Family: Yponomeutidae
- Genus: Thecobathra; Meyrick, 1922

Synonyms
- Pseudocalantica Friese, 1960

Genus of moths

Thecobathra is a genus of moths of the family Yponomeutidae.

== Species ==
- Thecobathra acropercna - Meyrick, 1922
- Thecobathra anas - Stringer, 1930
- Thecobathra argophanes - Meyrick, 1907
- Thecobathra casta - Meyrick, 1907
- Thecobathra delias - Meyrick, 1913
- Thecobathra dilechria - Bradley, 1982
- Thecobathra eta - Moriuti, 1963
- Thecobathra kappa - Moriuti, 1963
- Thecobathra kurokoi - Moriuti, 1982
- Thecobathra lambda - Moriuti, 1963
- Thecobathra nakaoi - Moriuti, 1965
- Thecobathra nivalis - Moriuti, 1971
- Thecobathra sororiata - Moriuti, 1971
- Thecobathra yasudai - Moriuti, 1965
