= Thecobathra anas =

Scientific classification
- Kingdom: Animalia
- Phylum: Arthropoda
- Clade: Pancrustacea
- Class: Insecta
- Order: Lepidoptera
- Family: Yponomeutidae
- Genus: Thecobathra
- Species: T. anas

Binomial name
- Thecobathra anas (Stringer, 1930)

Synonyms
- Niphonympha anas Stringer, 1930; Pseudocalantica anas; Scythropiodes unimaculata Matsumura, 1931

Species of moth

Thecobathra anas is a moth in the family Yponomeutidae. It was described by Stringer in 1930. It is found in Korea, Japan and Indonesia.

The wingspan is 12–18 mm. Adults are silvery white.

The larvae feed on Castanopsis cuspidata, Quercus glauca and Quercus serrata.
