= Odites perissa =

Scientific classification
- Kingdom: Animalia
- Phylum: Arthropoda
- Class: Insecta
- Order: Lepidoptera
- Family: Depressariidae
- Genus: Odites
- Species: O. perissa

Binomial name
- Odites perissa Diakonoff, [1968]

Synonyms
- Odites perissa atrimersa Diakonoff, [1968]

Species of moth

Odites perissa is a moth in the family Depressariidae. It was described by Alexey Diakonoff in 1968. It is found on Luzon in the Philippines.

The wingspan is 16–17 mm. The forewings are pale ochreous, the costal edge brighter ochreous yellow. The markings are fuscous black, slightly varying. There is a minute dot at the extreme base, often absent. The first discal stigma is found just before one-third, slightly elongate or rounded, seldom preceded by one or two faint points. The plical stigma varies, it is elongate or round, larger or as large as the first discal, and beyond it. The second discal is small and round, found on the closing vein. There is a faint, strongly curved series of dots halfway between the cell and the margin, and sometimes dots below veins 10 and 6 or 6 and 7, respectively, much larger than other dots. Sometimes, there are a few dark scales scattered above and below the cell. There are suffused grey costal spots on the ends of veins 11-9, becoming smaller posteriorly, and there is a row of well-defined dark dots on the ends of the veins along the termen to the tornus. Sometimes, there is some irregular irroration along the dorsum. The hindwings are whitish ochreous, with a silky gloss and faint purplish reflections, the ends of the veins along the upper part of the termen minutely dotted with dark.
