= Odites microbolista =

Scientific classification
- Kingdom: Animalia
- Phylum: Arthropoda
- Class: Insecta
- Order: Lepidoptera
- Family: Depressariidae
- Genus: Odites
- Species: O. microbolista

Binomial name
- Odites microbolista Meyrick, 1937

Species of moth

Odites microbolista is a moth in the family Depressariidae. It was described by Edward Meyrick in 1937. It is found in Uganda.

The larvae feed on Coffea species, rolling the leaves of their host plant.
