= Scythropiodes malivora =

Scientific classification
- Kingdom: Animalia
- Phylum: Arthropoda
- Class: Insecta
- Order: Lepidoptera
- Family: Lecithoceridae
- Genus: Scythropiodes
- Species: S. malivora

Binomial name
- Scythropiodes malivora (Meyrick, 1930)

Synonyms
- Odites malivora Meyrick, 1930

Species of moth

Scythropiodes malivora is a moth in the family Lecithoceridae. It was described by Edward Meyrick in 1930. It is found in Korea, Japan (Honshu, Hiroshima), China (Manchuria) and the Russian Far East.

The wingspan is 23–28 mm.

The larvae have been recorded feeding on Pyrus malus, Malus pumila, Castanea crenata and Lagerstroemia indica.
