= List of durian diseases and pests =

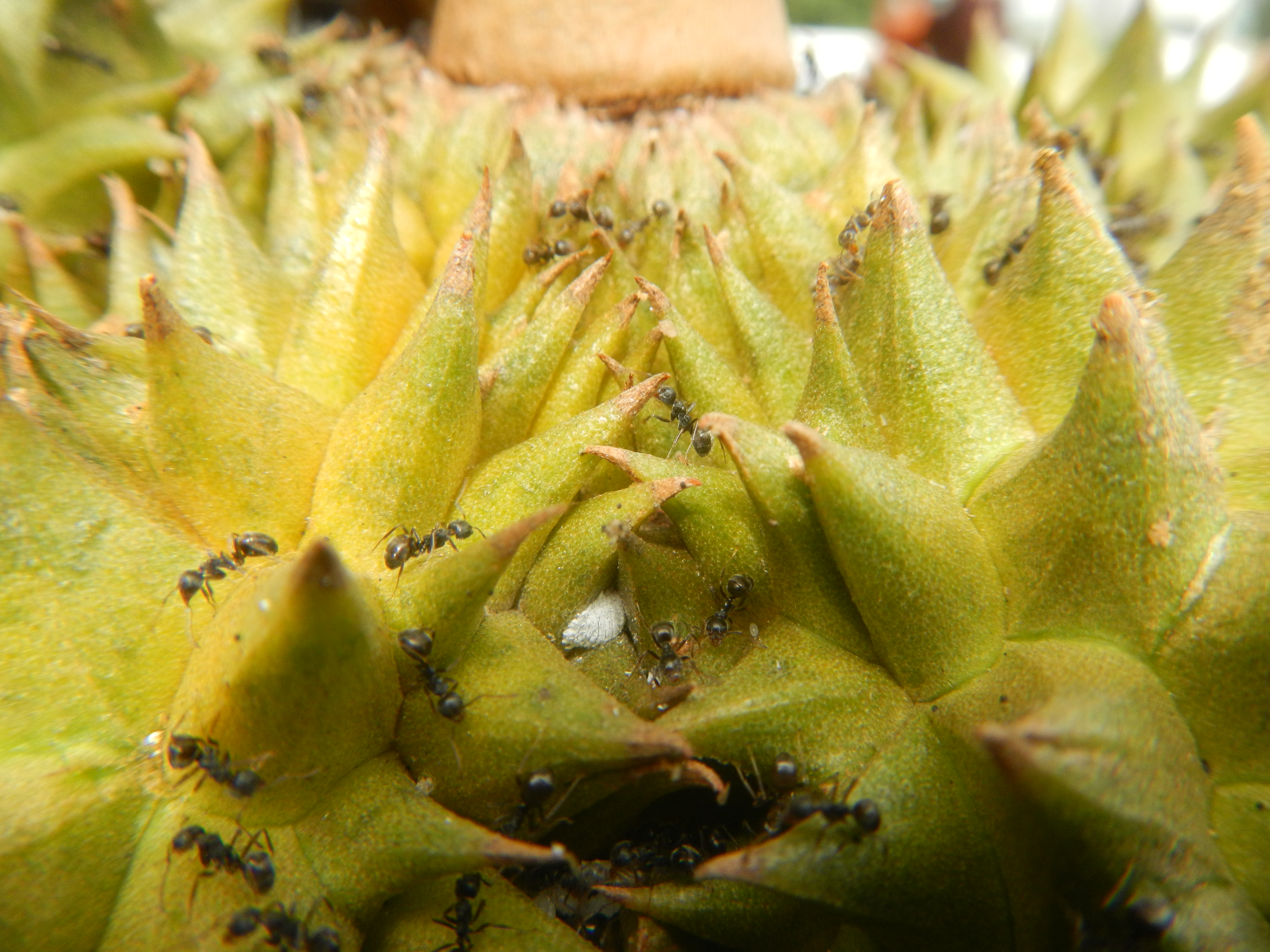
Black garden ants (Lasius niger) eating a durian at a market in Pulilan, Bulacan. Note also the fuzzy white scale insect in the center.

Durians are an agricultural product affected by many plant pathogens and pests. Most of the information here concerns Durio zibethinus, the major commercial species, but a dozen species in the genus Durio are edible durians, and several of those are also grown commercially and these diseases can concern them as well.

== Algae ==
- algal leaf spot, red rust (Cephaleuros virescens)

== Animals ==
=== Vertebrates ===
These are animals that eat or destroy durian fruit or trees. Many of these are shot or poisoned by farmers. Some of these species naturally act as seed dispersers, which benefits the plant but does not benefit farmers.

- black hornbill (Anthracoceros malayanus)
- squirrel
  - grey-bellied squirrel (Callosciurus caniceps)
  - black-striped squirrel (Callosciurus nigrovittatus)
  - plantain squirrel (Callosciurus notatus)
  - Prevost's squirrel (Callosciurus prevostii)
- Asian elephant (Elephas maximus)
- Sun bears (Helarctos malayanus)
- crab-eating macaque (Macaca fascicularis)
- Rats
  - Malayan field rat (Rattus tiomanicus)
- Bornean orangutan (Pongo pygmaeus),
- feral pig (Sus scrofa domesticus) and wild boar (Sus scrofa)
- viverrids (Viverridae sp.)

=== Invertebrates ===
Most of these are arthropods, but nematodes and gastropods are also of concern.

==== Arthropods ====
- Acrocercops sp.
- Adoretus sp.
- Allocarsidara malayensis (Carsidaridae)
- "durian psyllid" (Allocarsidara malayensis synonym Tenaphalara malayensis); also Diclidophlebia sp. (as synonym Haplaphalara) in the Philippines
- leaf roller (Adoxophyes privatana)
- durian leaf hopper (Amrasca durianae)
- shining leaf chafer (Anomala sp.)
- cotton aphid (Aphis gossypii)
- Apogonia sp.
- leaf eating beetle (Aprosterna pallida)
- leaf roller (Archips machlopis syn. Cacoecia machlopis)
- leaf eating (Arctornis cygna)
- leaf eating (Arthisma scissuralis)
- coconut scale (Aspidiotus destructor)
- leaf scale (Asterolecanium sp.)
  - Asterolecaniam ungulata (probably Asterolecanium ungulatum)
- flower webber Autoba versicolor (Syn. Eublemma versicolora)
- stem borer (Batocera gultata)
- borer (Canopia sp.)
- sap beetle (Carpophilus sp.)
  - sap beetle (Carpophilus floveicollis)
- Cephonodes ?higlas
- longhorn beetle larvae (Cerambycidae)
- Chalcoscelis albiguttata -pest of leaves
- leaf eating, gelatine grub (Chalcocelis albiguttatus)
- scale insect (Coccoidea)
- scale insect, soft scale (Coccus sp.)
- durian fruit borer, durian husk borer, yellow peach moth, Queensland bollworm (Conogethes punctiferalis syn. Monogatus puntiferalis and Dichocrocis punctiferalis)
- trunk borer (Conopia sp.), secondary infection after Phytophthora palmivora
- leaf eating bagworm (Pteroma pendula)
- litchi fruit moth, macadamia nut borer (Cryptophlebia ombrodelta)
- Indo-Malaysian drywood termite (Cryptotermes cynocephalus)
- leaf mining grub (Dactylispa leonardi)
- durian hawkmoth (Daphnusa ocellaris)

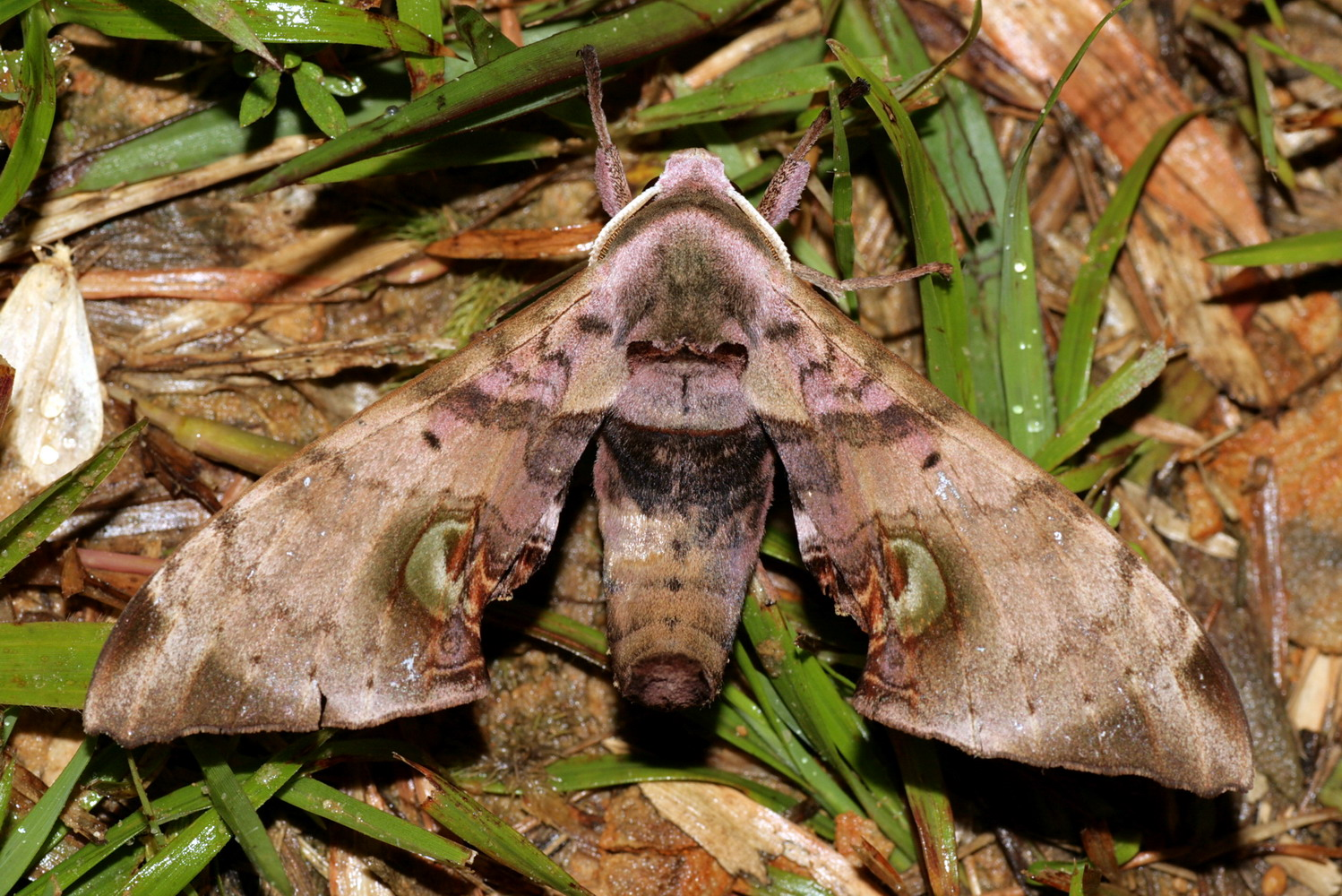
durian hawkmoth spotted in Crocker Range National Park

- leaf eating tussock moth (Dasychira inclusa)
- tussock moth (Dasychira mendosa)
- tussock moth (Dasychira osseata)
- Drosophila punctpennis
- leaf eating caterpillar (Erizada lichenaria)
- African red mite, citrus brown mite (Eutetranychus africanus)
- oriental red mite (Eutetranychus orientalis Klein misidentification)
- cotton leaf roller (Haritalodes derogata (syn. Sylepta derogata)
- cotton boll worm (Helicoverpa armigera formerly Heliothis armigera)
- horned treehopper (Hemicentrus attenuatus (Sarritor attenuatus)
- leaf roller moth (Homona coffearia)
- leaf roller moth (Homono difficilis)
- leaf roller moth (Homona eductana)
- flower eating moth (Horaga onyx onyx)
- leaf eating weevil (Hypomeces squamosus)
- durian fruit borer (Hypoperigea leprosticta syn. Plagideicta leprosticta)
- Stem scale insect (Icerya sp.)
- Idiophantis chiridota
- termite (Isoptera), specifically lumber of Durio carinatus
- Lacifer javanus
- powderpost beetle (Lyctus sp.)
- leaf eating caterpillar (Lymantria marginata)
- coconut case worm (Mahasena corbetti)
- thrip (Megalurothrips sp.)
- Microtermes pallidus
- hairy powderpost beetle (Minthea rugicollis), recorded on Durio lowianus and Durio oxleyanus
- Monolepta bifasciata
- durian seed borer (Mudaria luteileprosa)
- durian seed borer (Mudaria magniplaga)
- Nodostoma sp.
- mite (Oligonychus biharensis)
- Orthaga semialba
- cocoa tussock moth (Orgyia postica)
- tussock moth (Orygia turbata)
- longan leaf-eating looper (Oxyodes scrobiculata)
- leaf eating caterpillar (Paracrama dulcissima)
- Paralecanium expansum
- Paralecanium vacuum
- Phenacaspis hedyoticlis
- Phostria nicoalis
- Phostria xipharesalis
- durian seed and fruit borer (Plagideicta magniplaga (syn. Mudaria magniplaga)
- coffee mealybug (Planococcus lilacinus)
- mealybug (Planococcus minor)
- ambrosia beetle (Platypodinae or Scolytinae)
- Platypus cupulatus
- weevil (Platytrachelus psittacinus)
- red coffee borer, red branch borer (Polyphagozerra coffeae syn. Zeuzera coffeae)
- up-country tea termite (Postelectrotermes militaris)
- mealybug (Pseudococcus sp.) description matches Planococcus minor)
- flower eating moth (Rapala dieneces dieneces)
- fruit eating moth (Remelana jangala ravata)
- Rhadinomerus sp.
- stem borer (Rhytidodera simulans)
- scale insect, soft scale insect (Saissetia sp.)
- Scheloribates sp.
- chilli thrips (Scirtothrips dorsalis)
- Seira jacobsoni
- leaf eating caterpillar (Setora fletcheri)
- leaf eating (Spilosoma sp.)
- bark feeder (Squamura sp.)
  - Squamura maculata (syn. Indarbela flavina)
- leaf eating (Suana concolor)
- Sylepta bipunctalis
- Synanthedon sp.
- Tenaphalara malayensis
- mite (Tetranychus fijiensis)'
- thrips (Thrips coloratus)
- thrips (Thrips hawaiiensis)
- oil palm bunch moth (Tirathaba mundella)
- fruit boring caterpillar (Tirathaba ruptilinea)
- leaf eating caterpillar (Tiruvaca subcostalis)
- durian rind borer, fruit borer (Tonica terasella)
- citrus aphid (Toxoptera aurantii)
- mould mite (Tyrophagus putrescentiae)
- Xyleborus cordatus
- Xyleborus declivigranulatus
- typical bark beetle (Xyleborus ferrugineus)
- tea shot hole borer (Xyleborus fornicatus)
- Xyleborus formicatus
- Xyleborus similis
- Xyleborus testsceus (syn. Xyleborus perforans)
- borer (Zeuzera sp.)

==== Other invertebrates ====
- spiral nematode Helicotylenchus sp.
- giant African snail (Lissachatina fulica formerly Achatina fulica)
- Macroposthonia sp.
- root-knot nematode Meloidogyne sp.
- lesion nematode Pratylenchus sp.
  - hypocotyl rot (Pratylenchus coffeae)
- Radopholus sp.
- reniform nematode Rotylenchulus reniformis
- stunt nematode Tylenchorhynchus sp.
- dagger nematode Xiphinema sp.

== Bacteria ==
- stem canker (Enterobacter sp.)
- postharvest fruit rot (Erwinia sp.)
- stem canker (Flavobacterium sp.)
- stem canker (Pseudomonas sp.)

== Fungi ==
Fungi affect both the tree before harvest and the fruit after harvest. Some listed species may only cause cosmetic damage, or the association is unknown.

- stem rot (Albonectria rigidiuscula syn. Calonectria rigidiuscula, Fusarium decemcellulare)
- Sclerotium fruit rot (Athelia rolfsii syn. Sclerotium rolfsii, Corticium rolfsii)
- leaf fungus (Aschersonia)
- secondary/opportunistic fruit rot (Aspergillus niger and other Aspergillus spp.)
- stem rot (Bionectria ochroleuca syn. Nectria ochroleuca)
- Calonectria kyotensis
- secondary/opportunistic fruit rot (Candida sp.)
- sooty mold (Capnodium moniliforme)
- leaf spot (Cercospora sp.)
- seedling dieback (Chaetomium trilaterale)
- leaf anthracnose, root rot (Colletotrichum sp., syn. Glomerella)
  - Colletotrichum durionis
  - Colletotrichum zibethinum
- Coriolus vesicolor
- leaf spot and dieback (Corticium solani)
- leaf blotch (Corynespora cassiicola)
- Curvularia sp.
- leaf spot (Curvularia affinis)
- scion dieback (Diplodia sp.)
  - die back (Diplodia durionis)
- root disease (Fusarium sp.)
  - Fusarium fruit rot, stem rot (Fusarium solani syn. Nectria haematococca, Haematonectria haematococca)
  - Fusarium oxysporum
- twig blight (Fusicoccum sp.)
- Ganoderma pseudoferreus
- Geotrichum candidum
- secondary/opportunistic fruit rot (Gibberella intricans)
- Gliocephalotrichum bulbilium
- leaf spot (Gloeosporium sp.)
  - anthracnose (Gloeosporimn zibethinum)
- leaf anthracnose and leaf spot (Glomerella cingulata syn. Colletotrichum gloeosporioides)?
- black and brown leaf spot (Homostegia durionis)
- Lasiodiplodia sp.
- Diplodia fruit rot (Lasiodiplodia theobromae syn. Botryodiplodia theobromae) - can also cause dieback and leaf scorch
- Lentinus subnudus
- sooty mold (Leptoxyphium sp.)
- Macrophomina phaseolina (syn. Macrophomina phaseoli)
- thread blight (Marasmiellus scandens)
- black mildew, sooty mould (Meliola durionis)
- Metacapnodium dennisii
- sooty mold (Metacapnodium moniliforme)
- Mucor rot, fruit rot (Mucor sp.)
- leaf spot (Myrothecium verrucaria)
- bark rot (Nectria sp.)
- powdery mildew (Oidium sp.)
  - powdery mildew (Oidium nephelii)
- leaf mould Passalora fulva (syn. Cladosporium fulvum
- secondary/opportunistic fruit rot (Penicillium sp.)
- seedling dieback (Perisporium sp.)
- leaf spot (Pestalotia sp.)
- pink disease/cendawan angin (Phanerochaete salmonicolor syn. Botryobasidium salmonicolor, Corticium salmonicolor, Erythricium salmonicolor)
- leaf spot (Phomopsis sp.)
  - Phomopsis leaf spot, Phomopsis fruit rot, branch and stem necrosis, leaf spot of seedlings (Phomopsis durionis)
- sooty mould of fruits, twigs, and leaves (Phragmocapnias betle)
- Phyllachora makrospora
- seedling rim blight, leaf spot, postharvest fruit rot (Phyllosticta sp.)
  - rim blight, leaf spot (Phyllosticta durionis)
- leaf parasite (Placosphaeria durionis)
- Plokamidomyces colensoi
- black crust of fruit, leaf mould, sooty mold (Polychaeton sp.)
- postharvest fruit rot (Pseudocochliobolus eragrostidis, syn. Curvularia eragrostidis, Cochliobolus eragrostidis)
- leaf spot (Pyrenochaeta sp.)
- leaf blight, leaf fall (Rhizoctonia sp.)
  - Rhizoctonia leaf blight, leaf fall, foliar blight, leaf rot (Rhizoctonia solani syn. Thanatephorus cucumeris)
- Rhizopus sp.
  - Rhizopus rot, fruit rot (Rhizopus stolonifer sy. Rhizopus artocarpi)
- wood rot, white root disease (Rigidoporus microporus syn. Fomes lignosus, Rigidoporus lignosus)
- Typhula sp. (syn. Sclerotium sp.)
- sooty mold (Scorias spongiosa)
- leaf mould (Spiropes capensis syn. Helminthosporium capensis)
- Trametes persoonii
- sooty mould of twigs, petioles, and leaves (Trichomerium grandisporum)
- black film on leaves, sooty mold (Trichopeltheca asiatica)
- sooty mold Tripospermum sp.
- scion dieback (Ustulina sp.)
- Verticillium sp.

== Oomycetes ==
Oomycetes are often confused with fungi.

- Phytophthora botryosa
- leaf blight (Phytophthora nicotianae var. nicotianae)
- Phytophthora nicotianae var. parasitica
- bark rot, fruit rot, hypocotyl rot, patch canker, root rot (Phytophthora palmivora)
- Phytophthora parasitica
- root rot (Pythium sp.)
  - Pythium root rot, patch canker, root disease (Pythium vexans syn. Pythium complectens, Phytopythium vexans

== Plants ==
Some plants growing on durian trees can be problematic or even parasitic.

- dragon scales (Drymoglossum piloselloides)
- mistletoe (Elytranthe barnesii)
- mistletoe (Loranthus pentandrus)

== Non-pathogenic epiphytes and symbiotes ==
These species live on or in durian trees as epiphytes but typically do not harm the tree or fruit. However, Trentepohlia species can grow thick enough to block lenticels and inhibit ramiflorous flowering.

- Aschersonia placentae (teleomorph: Hypocrella raciborskii)
- Diploicia canescens (formerly Buellia canescens
- oakleaf fern (Drynaria quercifolia) Anderson (1966)
- strangling fig (Ficus benjamina) Anderson (1966)
- Hypocrella raciborskii (syn. Aschersonia placentae)
- Parmelia sp.
- Phycopeltis
- Pleurococcus
  - Pleurococcus nagelii
- Trebouxia
- Trentepohlia sp.
  - Trentepohlia arboreum
  - Trentepohlia arborum (syn. Trentepohlia bisporangiata)
  - Trentepohlia aurea
  - Trentepohlia monile (syn. Physolinum monilis, Trentepohlia moniliformis)
- Velvet felt, felt fungus (Septobasidium sp.)

== Hyperparasites and secondary associations ==
Hyperparasitism is when durian parasites become the hosts for other parasites.

- Aschersonia placenta is a pest of Asterolecanium ungulata
- Bionectria ochroleuca (syn. Nectria ochroleuca) is associated with Albonectria rigidiuscula
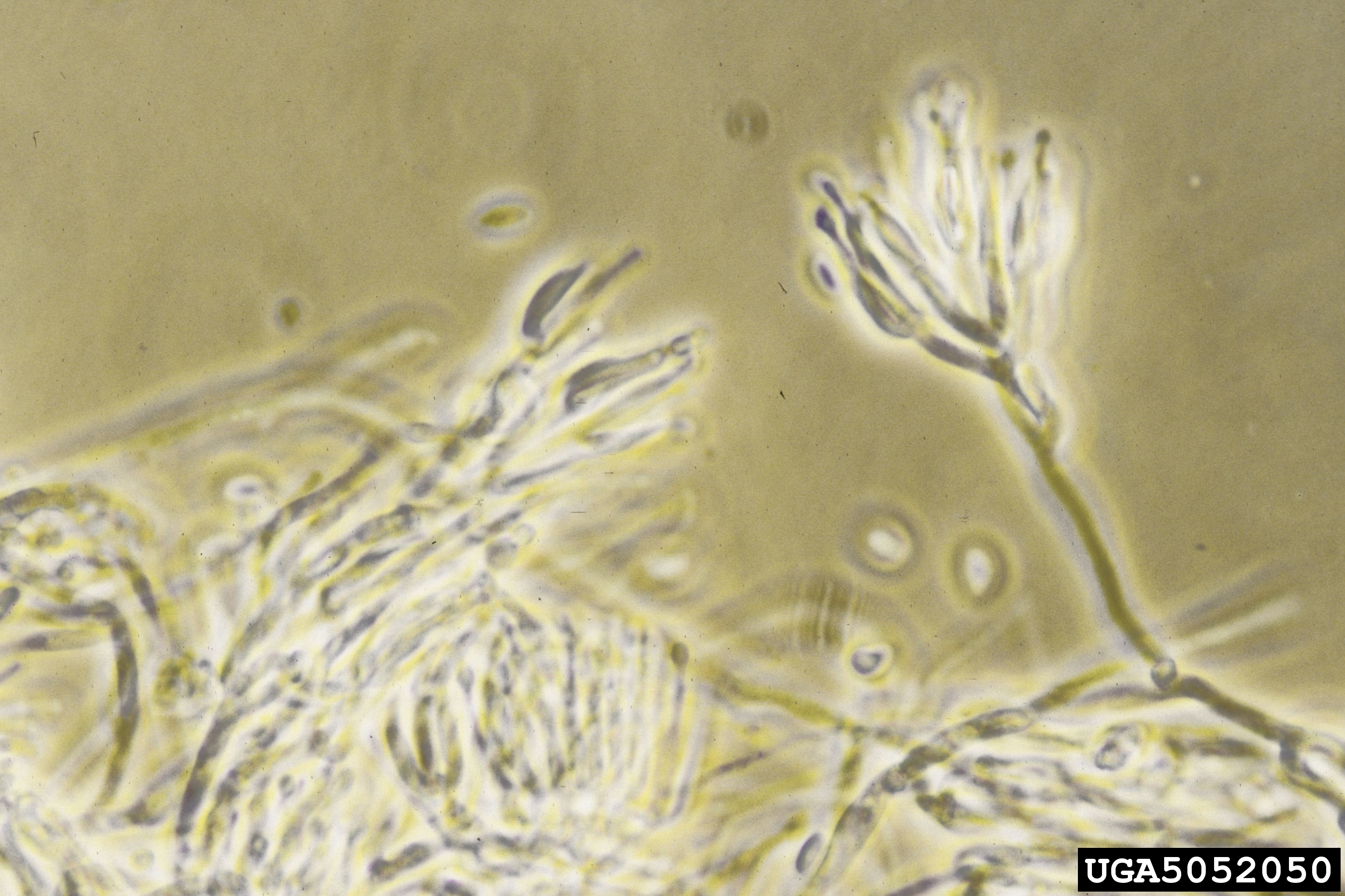
  Bionectria ochroleuca
- Gliocladium roseum is a parasite of Phytophthora palmivora
- Hypocrella raciborskii is a pest of Asterolecanium ungulata
- Loranthus ferrugineus can parasitize Viscum articulatum, which can be a parasite of Elytranthe barnesii
- Nectria haemalococca is associated with Albonectria rigidiuscula
