= Idiophantis callicarpa =

Scientific classification
- Domain: Eukaryota
- Kingdom: Animalia
- Phylum: Arthropoda
- Class: Insecta
- Order: Lepidoptera
- Family: Gelechiidae
- Genus: Idiophantis
- Species: I. callicarpa

Binomial name
- Idiophantis callicarpa Meyrick, 1927

Species of moth

Idiophantis callicarpa is a moth of the family Gelechiidae. It was described by Edward Meyrick in 1927. It is found on Samoa.
