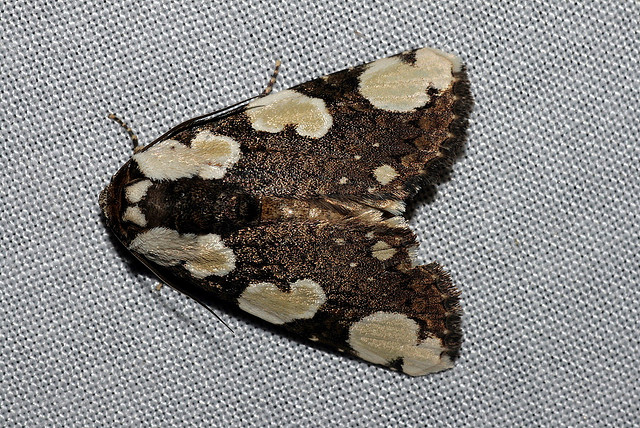

Scientific classification
- Kingdom: Animalia
- Phylum: Arthropoda
- Clade: Pancrustacea
- Class: Insecta
- Order: Lepidoptera
- Superfamily: Noctuoidea
- Family: Noctuidae
- Genus: Mudaria
- Species: M. luteileprosa

Binomial name
- Mudaria luteileprosa Holloway, 1989

= Mudaria luteileprosa =

Durian pest moth

Mudaria luteileprosa, or the Durian seed borer is a species of moth in the family Noctuidae. It is found in Malaysia, Indonesia, and Thailand.

== Description ==
The wings and body are black-brown with medium large orbicular, sometimes cordate whitish maculae. Larvae are pink and bore into seeds of durians. It is considered a pest of Durian and due to its seed boring habit and behaviour, it can corrupt the flesh of the fruit.

== Behaviour ==
The adult moth lays eggs on the fruit near the calyx of the durian seed. When the fruit is 6 weeks old until the harvest period, it pierces through to eat the seed and excretes frass through the opening of the hole of where it bored, with no noticeable exterior damage. The larvae lives in the fruit until the fruit is mature, usually only one larva survives. When the larvae are mature, it will pierce through the rind to settle and make a silk cocoon in cool damp soil underground after going into the wandering stage. Most of the destroyed durian fruit are in the phase that the seed is robust, and the fruit also cannot be sold for fresh consumption. It is recorded to be monophagous. The pupal stage can last 1 month up to 9 months depending on if the climate is favourable. Because of it being a common pest of durian, it has been subjected to pesticides and pesticide testing to combat the pest.

== Gallery ==
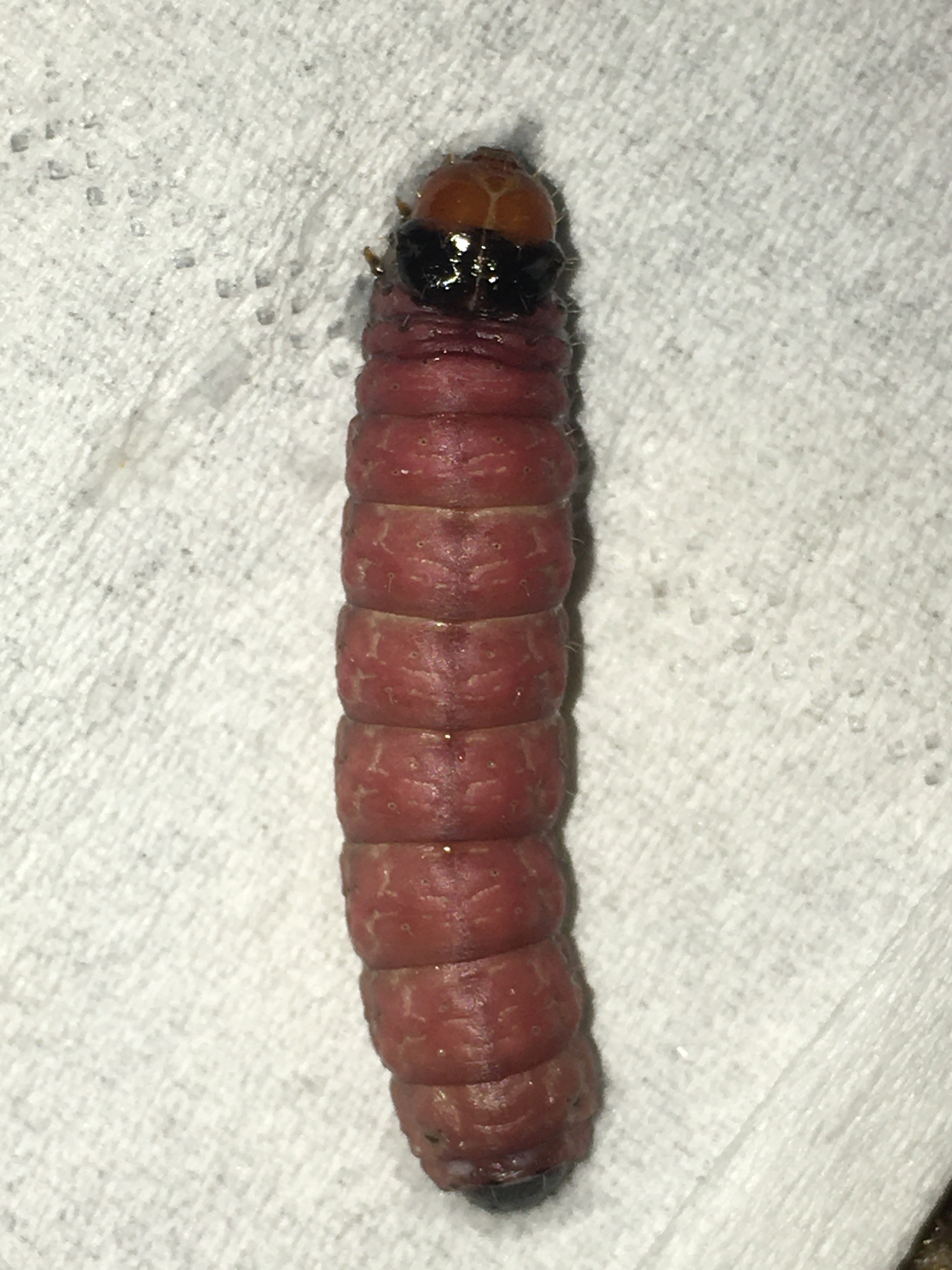
Mudaria luteileprosa larva

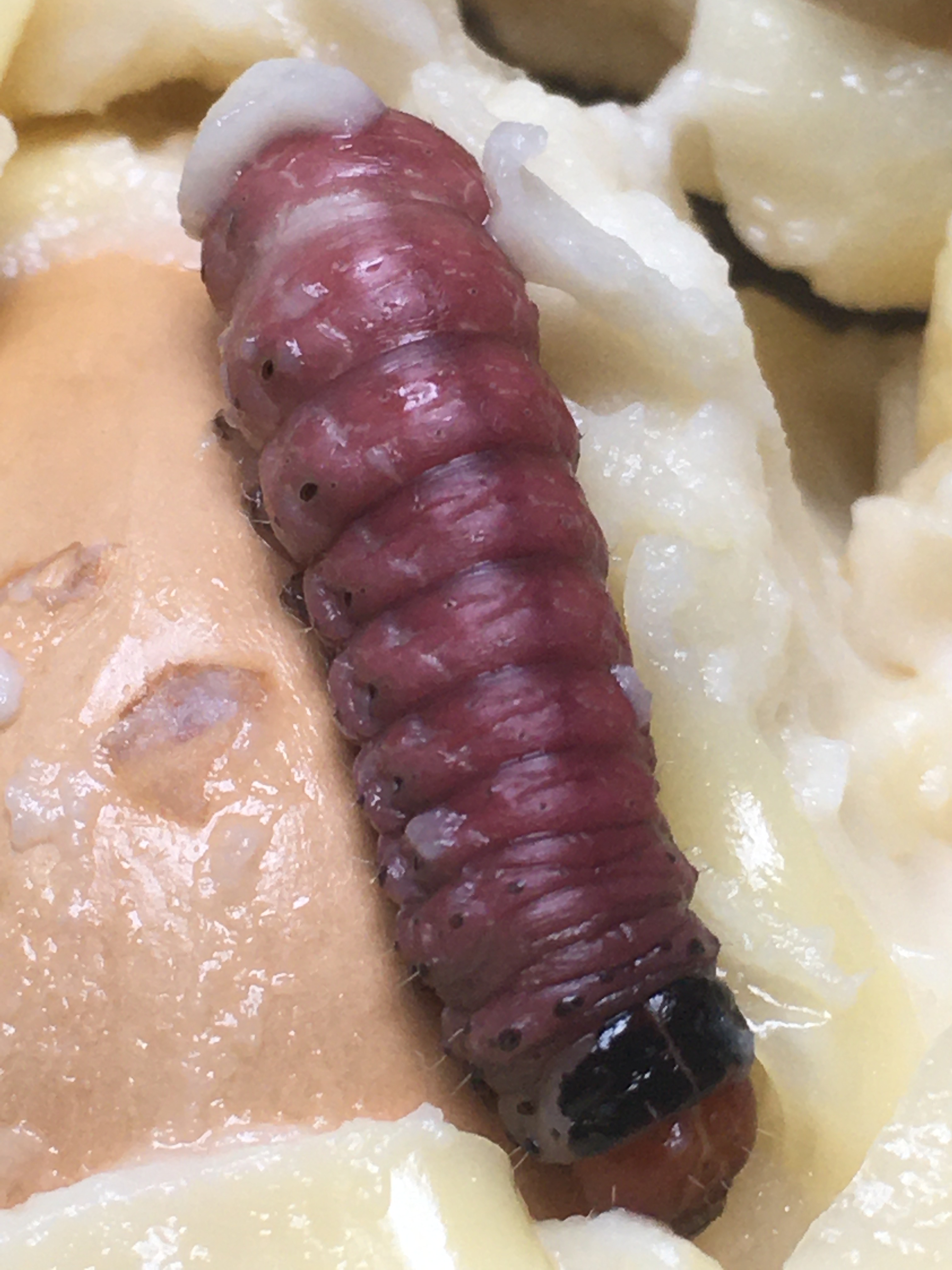
Durian seed borer on durian

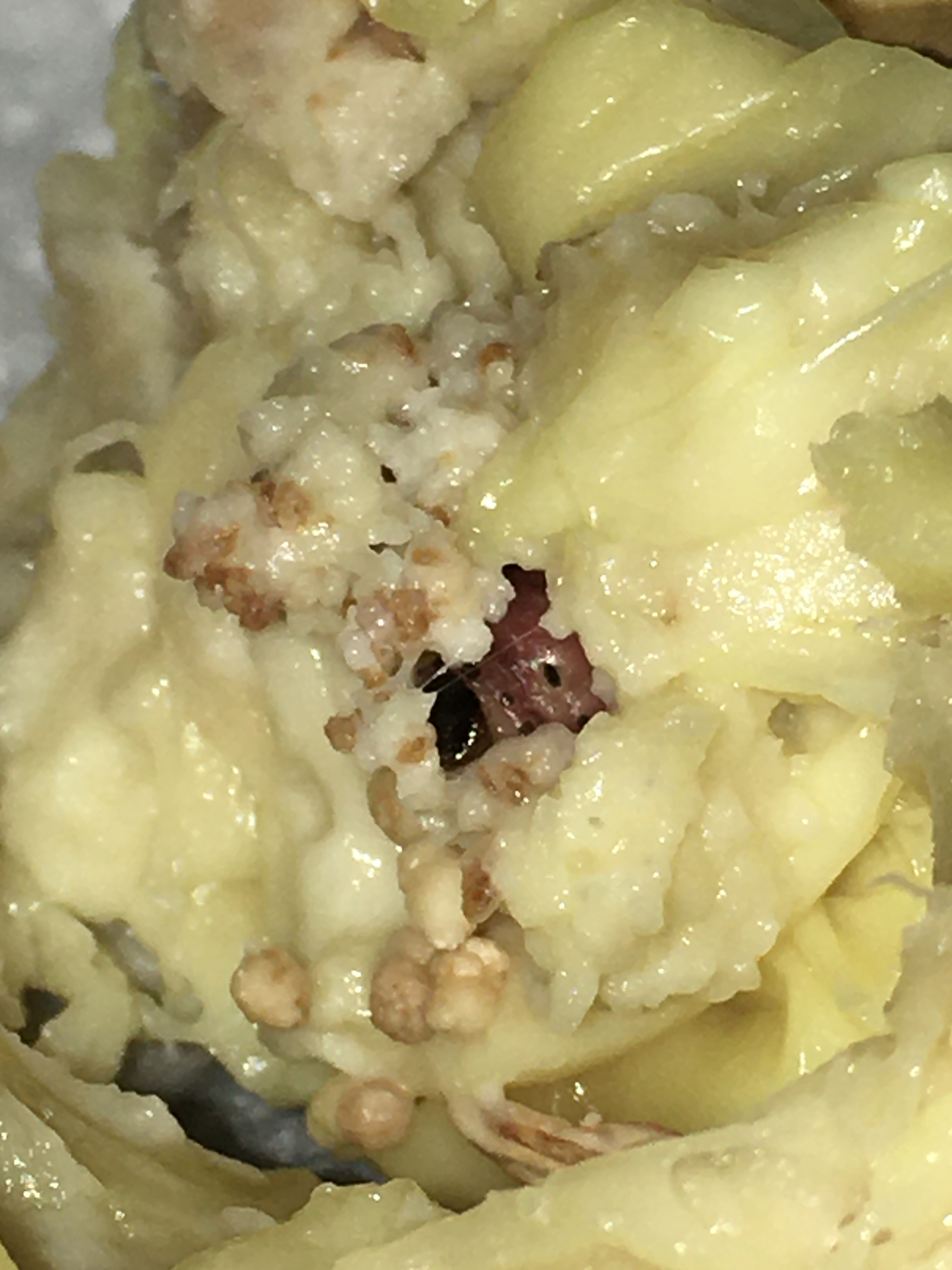
Mudaria luteileprosa larva boring into durian seed

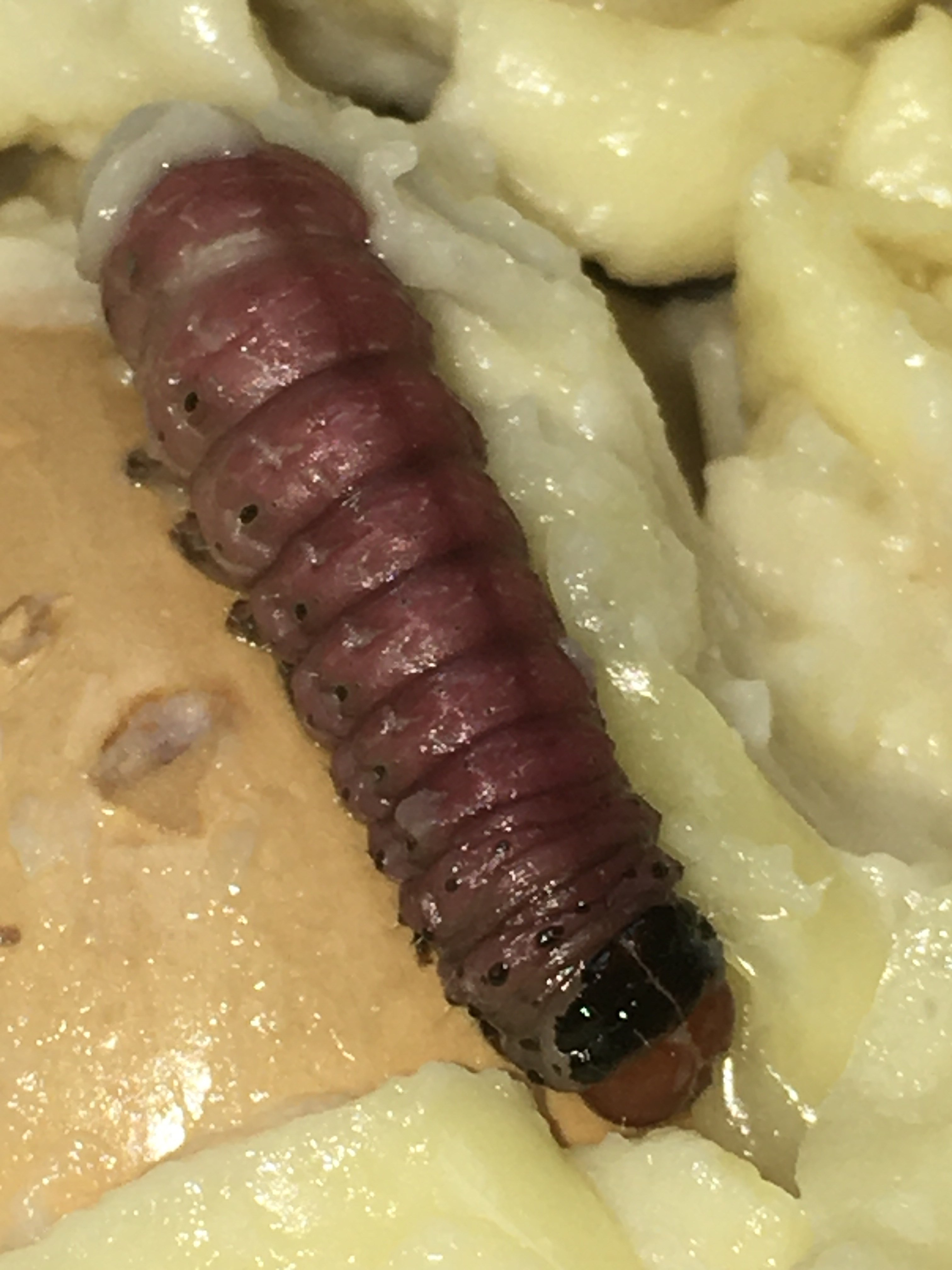
Pink coloured larva

== See also ==
- List of durian diseases and pests
