= Idiophantis carpotoma =

Scientific classification
- Domain: Eukaryota
- Kingdom: Animalia
- Phylum: Arthropoda
- Class: Insecta
- Order: Lepidoptera
- Family: Gelechiidae
- Genus: Idiophantis
- Species: I. carpotoma

Binomial name
- Idiophantis carpotoma Meyrick, 1916

Species of moth

Idiophantis carpotoma is a moth of the family Gelechiidae. It was described by Edward Meyrick in 1916. It is found in southern India.

The wingspan is about 14 mm. The forewings are dark fuscous, with the bases of the scales pale greyish ochreous and two yellow semi-oval dorsal blotches reaching halfway across the wing, the first about one-third, the second on the tornal area. There is a fulvous-yellow line from three-fifths of the costa to the posterior extremity of the second blotch, right angled in the disc, edged with black posteriorly towards the extremities, followed by a leaden streak from the costa, black edged posteriorly towards the costa, expanded beneath into a coppery-tinged spot filling the tornal prominence and marked with a black dot at its apex. The apical prominence beyond this is ferruginous yellow, cut by a short oblique white line near its base, continued along the lower margin to the apex. The hindwings are light grey.
