= Tonica centroluta =

Scientific classification
- Kingdom: Animalia
- Phylum: Arthropoda
- Clade: Pancrustacea
- Class: Insecta
- Order: Lepidoptera
- Family: Depressariidae
- Genus: Tonica
- Species: T. centroluta

Binomial name
- Tonica centroluta Diakonoff, 1966

Species of moth

Tonica centroluta is a moth in the family Depressariidae. It was described by Alexey Diakonoff in 1966. It is found on Borneo.
