= Idiophantis spectrata =

Scientific classification
- Domain: Eukaryota
- Kingdom: Animalia
- Phylum: Arthropoda
- Class: Insecta
- Order: Lepidoptera
- Family: Gelechiidae
- Genus: Idiophantis
- Species: I. spectrata

Binomial name
- Idiophantis spectrata Meyrick, 1911

Species of moth

Idiophantis spectrata is a moth of the family Gelechiidae. It was described by Edward Meyrick in 1911. It is found on the Seychelles, where it has been recorded from Mahé.

The wingspan is about 15mm. The forewings are light fuscous with a white stria from the costa to the tornus, rounded angulated in the middle, edged with dark grey and on the lower half suffused with grey, margined anteriorly by an orange-ochreous stria, and posteriorly on the upper half by a similar stria terminated beneath by a black dot. There is an orange streak in the apical prominence. The hindwings are light grey, the lower margin of the cell somewhat darker suffused, on the lower surface with a fringe of hairs along it.
