= Idiophantis anisosticta =

Scientific classification
- Domain: Eukaryota
- Kingdom: Animalia
- Phylum: Arthropoda
- Class: Insecta
- Order: Lepidoptera
- Family: Gelechiidae
- Genus: Idiophantis
- Species: I. anisosticta

Binomial name
- Idiophantis anisosticta Meyrick, 1916

Species of moth

Idiophantis anisosticta is a moth of the family Gelechiidae. It was described by Edward Meyrick in 1916. It is found in Sri Lanka and Myanmar.

The wingspan is 11–12 mm. The forewings are ochreous fuscous, with the discal stigmata blackish, the plical represented by an elongate cloudy darker fuscous spot beyond the first discal. There is an obtusely angulated pale bluish-grey dark-edged line from two-thirds of the costa to the dorsum before the tornal prominence, towards the costa becoming white and edged with blackish. There is a black dot following the angle of this line, edged beneath by a small spot of coppery-metallic suffusion, a blackish dot on the tornal margin beyond the line, and sometimes a small indistinct blackish dot between these. The apical prominence beyond the line is light ochreous yellowish, cut by an oblique whitish posteriorly blackish-edged line near and parallel to the preceding line, the blackish margin running into the apex. The hindwings are dark grey.
