= Idiophantis chalcura =

Scientific classification
- Domain: Eukaryota
- Kingdom: Animalia
- Phylum: Arthropoda
- Class: Insecta
- Order: Lepidoptera
- Family: Gelechiidae
- Genus: Idiophantis
- Species: I. chalcura

Binomial name
- Idiophantis chalcura Meyrick, 1907

Species of moth

Idiophantis chalcura is a moth of the family Gelechiidae. It was described by Edward Meyrick in 1907. It is found in Assam, India.

The wingspan is about 15 mm. The forewings are light ochreous fuscous, the costal half suffused with dark fuscous. The plical and second discal stigmata are large, cloudy and dark fuscous, the latter preceded by an additional elongate dot. There are two oblique white streaks, black edged posteriorly, from the costa at about three-fourths, the first running to the base of the excavation, the second to the apex, the apex between and beyond these pale ochreous. There is a black dot on the base of the excavation. The tornal prominence is bronzy metallic, edged anteriorly with blackish at the extremities, and crossed by two longitudinal pale yellowish lines. The hindwings are blackish grey.
