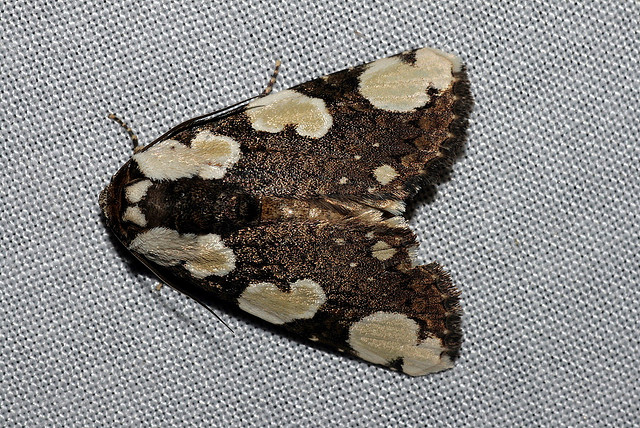
- Mudaria luteileprosa, Borneo

Scientific classification
- Domain: Eukaryota
- Kingdom: Animalia
- Phylum: Arthropoda
- Class: Insecta
- Order: Lepidoptera
- Superfamily: Noctuoidea
- Family: Noctuidae
- Genus: Mudaria; Moore, 1893

= Mudaria =

Genus of moths

Mudaria is a genus of moths of the family Noctuidae.

== Species ==
- Mudaria albonotata (Hampson, 1893)
- Mudaria arida (Rothschild, 1913)
- Mudaria cornifrons Moore, 1893
- Mudaria fisherae Prout, 1928
- Mudaria gigas (Holloway, 1982)
- Mudaria leprosa (Hampson, 1898)
- Mudaria leprosticta (Hampson, 1907)
- Mudaria luteileprosa Holloway, 1989
- Mudaria magniplaga (Walker, 1858)
- Mudaria major (Warren, 1914)
- Mudaria minor (Holloway, 1982)
- Mudaria minoroides Holloway, 1989
- Mudaria nubes (Kobes, 1982)
- Mudaria rudolfi (Kobes, 1982)
- Mudaria solidata (Warren, 1914)
- Mudaria tayi (Holloway, 1976)
- Mudaria turbata (Walker, 1858)
- Mudaria variabilis Roepke, 1916
- Mudaria wallacea (Holloway, 1982)
