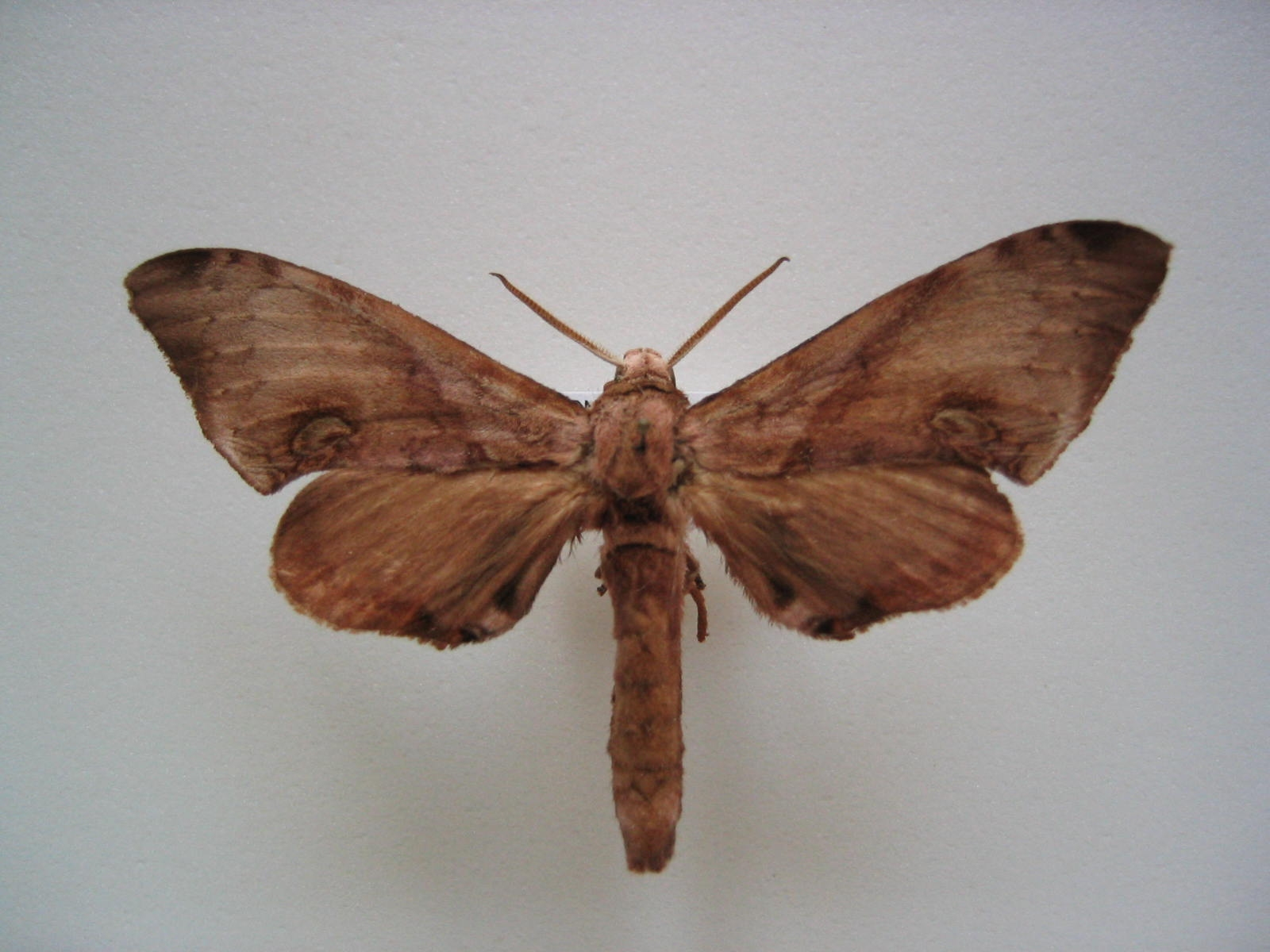
- Daphnusa zythum

Scientific classification
- Domain: Eukaryota
- Kingdom: Animalia
- Phylum: Arthropoda
- Class: Insecta
- Order: Lepidoptera
- Family: Sphingidae
- Genus: Daphnusa
- Species: D. zythum

Binomial name
- Daphnusa zythum Haxaire & Melichar, 2009

= Daphnusa zythum =

Species of moth

Daphnusa zythum is a species of moth of the family Sphingidae. It is known from Sumatra.
