= Idiophantis habrias =

Scientific classification
- Domain: Eukaryota
- Kingdom: Animalia
- Phylum: Arthropoda
- Class: Insecta
- Order: Lepidoptera
- Family: Gelechiidae
- Genus: Idiophantis
- Species: I. habrias

Binomial name
- Idiophantis habrias Meyrick, 1904

Species of moth

Idiophantis habrias is a moth of the family Gelechiidae. It was described by Edward Meyrick in 1904. It is found in Australia, where it has been recorded from Queensland.

The wingspan is about 11 mm (0.43 in). The forewings are whitish ochreous, with the dorsal half (or more anteriorly) reddish brown sprinkled with whitish. There is an elongate-triangular dark fuscous blotch extending along the costa, broadest posteriorly, its posterior edge is sinuate and connected by a curved line with the dorsal red-brown area. There are four white longitudinal lines, partially edged with dark fuscous, in the disc beyond this. An angulated pale golden-metallic dark-edged transverse line is found from the costa to the tornus, more whitish costally and there is also a pale leaden oblique streak from the costa beyond this to the apex, margined with light reddish brown, becoming dark fuscous on the costa. Two suffused dark fuscous marks are found on the termen. The hindwings are light grey, the apex dark grey.
