= Tonica nigricostella =

Scientific classification
- Kingdom: Animalia
- Phylum: Arthropoda
- Class: Insecta
- Order: Lepidoptera
- Family: Depressariidae
- Genus: Tonica
- Species: T. nigricostella

Binomial name
- Tonica nigricostella (Snellen, 1901)

Synonyms
- Cryptolechia nigricostella Snellen, 1901

Species of moth

Tonica nigricostella is a moth in the family Depressariidae. It was described by Snellen in 1901. It is found on Sumatra and Java.

The wingspan is 38-45 mm.
