= Mudaria leprosticta =

Scientific classification
- Kingdom: Animalia
- Phylum: Arthropoda
- Class: Insecta
- Order: Lepidoptera
- Superfamily: Noctuoidea
- Family: Noctuidae
- Genus: Mudaria
- Species: M. leprosticta

Binomial name
- Mudaria leprosticta (Hampson, 1907)

Synonyms
- Euplexia leprosticta Hampson, 1907; Plagideicta leprosticta Hampson, 1907

Species of moth

Mudaria leprosticta is a moth of the family Noctuidae first described by George Hampson in 1907. It is found in Sri Lanka.
