= Idiophantis stoica =

Scientific classification
- Domain: Eukaryota
- Kingdom: Animalia
- Phylum: Arthropoda
- Class: Insecta
- Order: Lepidoptera
- Family: Gelechiidae
- Genus: Idiophantis
- Species: I. stoica

Binomial name
- Idiophantis stoica Meyrick, 1907

Species of moth

Idiophantis stoica is a moth of the family Gelechiidae. It was described by Edward Meyrick in 1907. It is found in southern India. The wingspan is 15–16 mm. The forewings are pale ochreous, irregularly tinged with fuscous and with a cloudy dark fuscous subdorsal dot at one-fourth. The stigmata are blackish, the plical represented by two transversely placed dots enclosed in the fuscous suffusion, the second discal by two transversely placed dots, an additional dot midway between the lower of these and the upper plical. There is an oblique white line from four-fifths of the costa, edged with black on the costa, angulated opposite the terminal concavity and continued obsoletely to near the tornus. There is a white dark-edged line from the costa beyond this running to the apex and some blackish suffusion on the termen towards the middle. The hindwings are grey, paler towards the base.
