= Mudaria fisherae =

Scientific classification
- Kingdom: Animalia
- Phylum: Arthropoda
- Clade: Pancrustacea
- Class: Insecta
- Order: Lepidoptera
- Superfamily: Noctuoidea
- Family: Noctuidae
- Genus: Mudaria
- Species: M. fisherae

Binomial name
- Mudaria fisherae Prout, 1928

Species of moth

Mudaria fisherae is a moth of the family Noctuidae first described by Prout in 1928. It is found in Sri Lanka.
