= Idiophantis maelamunensis =

Scientific classification
- Kingdom: Animalia
- Phylum: Arthropoda
- Class: Insecta
- Order: Lepidoptera
- Family: Gelechiidae
- Genus: Idiophantis
- Species: I. maelamunensis

Binomial name
- Idiophantis maelamunensis Moriuti, 1993

Species of moth

Idiophantis maelamunensis is a moth of the family Gelechiidae. It is found in Thailand.
