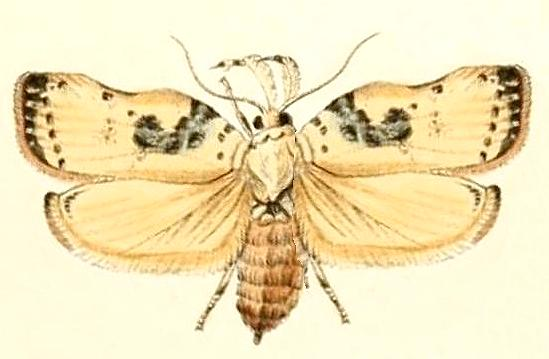

Scientific classification
- Kingdom: Animalia
- Phylum: Arthropoda
- Class: Insecta
- Order: Lepidoptera
- Family: Depressariidae
- Genus: Tonica
- Species: T. effractella

Binomial name
- Tonica effractella (Snellen, 1879)

Synonyms
- Cryptolechia effractella Snellen, 1878; Teratomorpha coeliota Turner, 1896

= Tonica effractella =

Species of moth

Tonica effractella is a moth in the family Depressariidae. It was described by Snellen in 1879. It is found in Australia, where it has been recorded from the Northern Territory, Queensland, New South Wales and Western Australia.
