= Idiophantis paraptila =

Scientific classification
- Domain: Eukaryota
- Kingdom: Animalia
- Phylum: Arthropoda
- Class: Insecta
- Order: Lepidoptera
- Family: Gelechiidae
- Genus: Idiophantis
- Species: I. paraptila

Binomial name
- Idiophantis paraptila Meyrick, 1916

Species of moth

Idiophantis paraptila is a moth of the family Gelechiidae. It was described by Edward Meyrick in 1916. It is found in Sri Lanka.

The wingspan is about 11 mm. The forewings are pale ochreous suffusedly irrorated (sprinkled) with light fuscous. The first discal and plical stigmata are indicated by small cloudy fuscous spots, the plical obliquely posterior. There is a fine obtusely angulated grey-whitish line from two-thirds of the costa to the dorsum before the tornal prominence, becoming white on the costa, marked just beneath the angle with a blackish dot, and with a minute black dot on the lower extremity. The tornal prominence is tinged with shining purplish, becoming coppery metallic on the upper margin, with a deep bluish longitudinal mark on the tornal margin edged above with ochreous. The apical prominence is pale yellow ochreous, cut by a very fine oblique whitish line irrorated with fuscous near and parallel to the preceding line. The hindwings are rather dark grey.
