= Tonica mixogama =

Scientific classification
- Kingdom: Animalia
- Phylum: Arthropoda
- Class: Insecta
- Order: Lepidoptera
- Family: Depressariidae
- Genus: Tonica
- Species: T. mixogama

Binomial name
- Tonica mixogama Meyrick, 1928

Species of moth

Tonica mixogama is a moth in the family Depressariidae. It was described by Edward Meyrick in 1928. It is found on New Britain of Papua New Guinea.
