= Idiophantis acanthopa =

Scientific classification
- Domain: Eukaryota
- Kingdom: Animalia
- Phylum: Arthropoda
- Class: Insecta
- Order: Lepidoptera
- Family: Gelechiidae
- Genus: Idiophantis
- Species: I. acanthopa

Binomial name
- Idiophantis acanthopa Meyrick, 1931

Species of moth

Idiophantis acanthopa is a moth of the family Gelechiidae. It was described by Edward Meyrick in 1931. It is found in India.

The larvae feed on Eugenia jambolana.
