= Tonica pharmacis =

Scientific classification
- Kingdom: Animalia
- Phylum: Arthropoda
- Class: Insecta
- Order: Lepidoptera
- Family: Depressariidae
- Genus: Tonica
- Species: T. pharmacis

Binomial name
- Tonica pharmacis Diakonoff, 1966

Species of moth

Tonica pharmacis is a moth in the family Depressariidae. It was described by Alexey Diakonoff in 1966. It is found on Sumatra.
