= Idiophantis lomatographa =

Scientific classification
- Domain: Eukaryota
- Kingdom: Animalia
- Phylum: Arthropoda
- Class: Insecta
- Order: Lepidoptera
- Family: Gelechiidae
- Genus: Idiophantis
- Species: I. lomatographa

Binomial name
- Idiophantis lomatographa Bradley, 1962

Species of moth

Idiophantis lomatographa is a moth of the family Gelechiidae. It was described by John David Bradley in 1962. It is found on Vanuatu in the South Pacific.
