= Idiophantis melanosacta =

Scientific classification
- Domain: Eukaryota
- Kingdom: Animalia
- Phylum: Arthropoda
- Class: Insecta
- Order: Lepidoptera
- Family: Gelechiidae
- Genus: Idiophantis
- Species: I. melanosacta

Binomial name
- Idiophantis melanosacta Meyrick, 1907

Species of moth

Idiophantis melanosacta is a moth of the family Gelechiidae. It was described by Edward Meyrick in 1907. It is found in southern India and Thailand.

The wingspan is 12–13 mm. The forewings are whitish ochreous with an elongate blackish patch extending along the costa from the base to beyond the middle, the apex oblique, the lower edge forming two broad subtriangular prominences reaching about halfway across the wing. There are two undefined blackish dots longitudinally placed in the disc beyond the middle and there is an angulated whitish line from three-fourths of the costa to the dorsum before the tornal prominence, edged with fuscous and on the costa edged with blackish. There is also a fine oblique parallel fuscous line beyond this on the upper half and a bronzy-metallic dot edged anteriorly with black on the termen beneath the base of the excavation. The hindwings are grey.
