= Idiophantis pandata =

Scientific classification
- Domain: Eukaryota
- Kingdom: Animalia
- Phylum: Arthropoda
- Class: Insecta
- Order: Lepidoptera
- Family: Gelechiidae
- Genus: Idiophantis
- Species: I. pandata

Binomial name
- Idiophantis pandata Bradley, 1961

Species of moth

Idiophantis pandata is a moth of the family Gelechiidae. It was described by John David Bradley in 1961. It is found on Guadalcanal.
