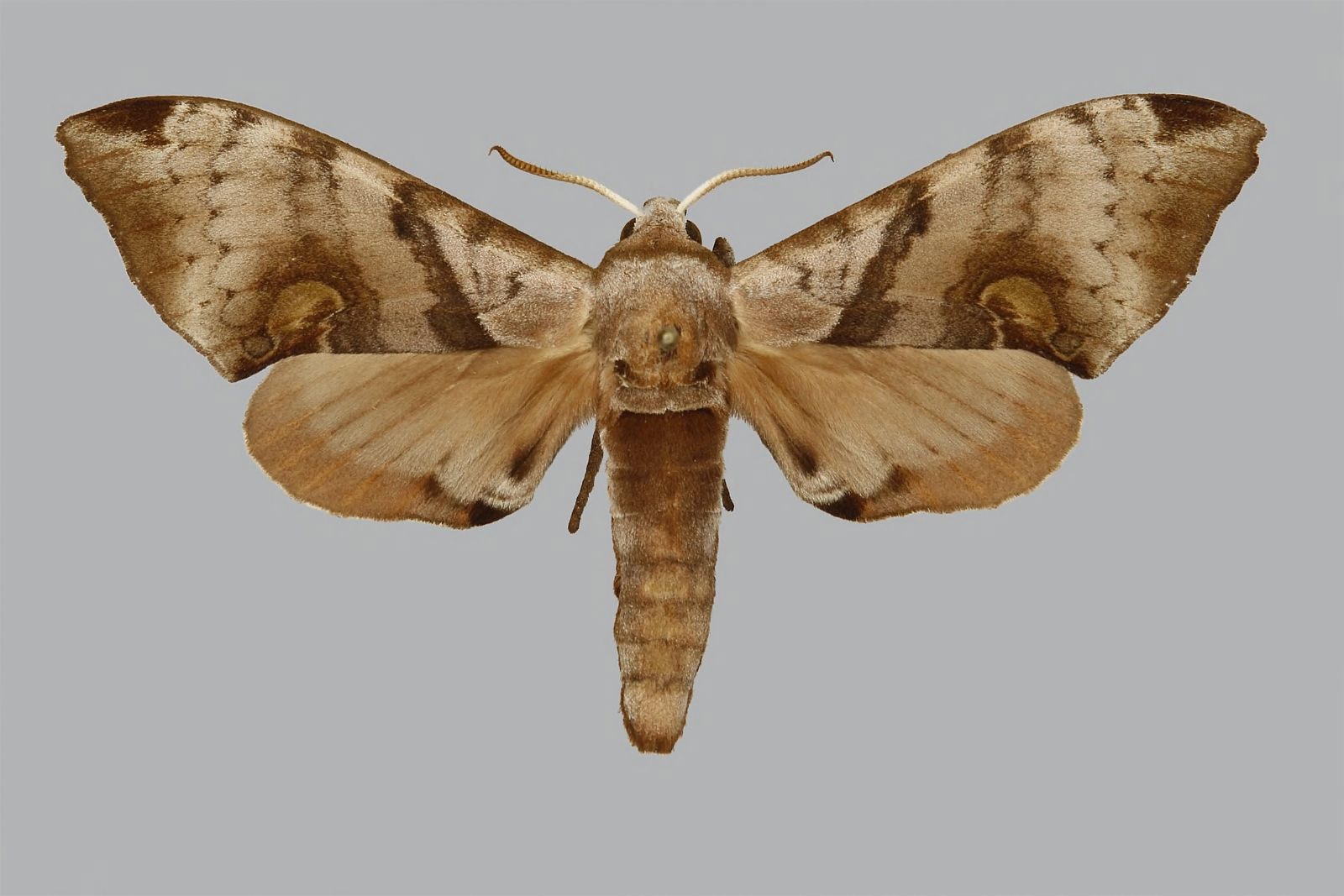
- Male

Scientific classification
- Domain: Eukaryota
- Kingdom: Animalia
- Phylum: Arthropoda
- Class: Insecta
- Order: Lepidoptera
- Family: Sphingidae
- Genus: Daphnusa
- Species: D. ailanti

Binomial name
- Daphnusa ailanti (Boisduval, 1875)

Synonyms
- Daphnusa ocellaris splendens Gehlen, 1928; Smerinthus ailanti Boisduval, 1875

= Daphnusa ailanti =

Species of moth

Daphnusa ailanti is a species of moth of the family Sphingidae. It is endemic to Sulawesi.
