= Idiophantis discura =

Scientific classification
- Domain: Eukaryota
- Kingdom: Animalia
- Phylum: Arthropoda
- Class: Insecta
- Order: Lepidoptera
- Family: Gelechiidae
- Genus: Idiophantis
- Species: I. discura

Binomial name
- Idiophantis discura Meyrick, 1907

Species of moth

Idiophantis discura is a moth of the family Gelechiidae. It was described by Edward Meyrick in 1907. It is found in Sri Lanka.

The wingspan is 13–14 mm. The forewings are fuscous with a strongly-curved light leaden-bluish dark-edged line from two-thirds of the costa to the dorsum before the tornal prominence, more or less obscurely margined with ochreous anteriorly. The apical and tornal prominences, beyond this are light ochreous yellow, with a grey-whitish streak along the upper part of the apical prominence, and some black suffusion towards the middle of the termen. The hindwings are grey.
