= Mudaria albonotata =

Scientific classification
- Kingdom: Animalia
- Phylum: Arthropoda
- Class: Insecta
- Order: Lepidoptera
- Superfamily: Noctuoidea
- Family: Noctuidae
- Genus: Mudaria
- Species: M. albonotata

Binomial name
- Mudaria albonotata (Hampson, 1893)

Synonyms
- Tarache albonotata Hampson, 1893; Tarache plumbicula Hampson, 1906; Plagideicta albonotata Hampson, 1893

Species of moth

Mudaria albonotata is a moth of the family Noctuidae first described by George Hampson in 1893. It is found in Sri Lanka.
