= Idiophantis hemiphaea =

Scientific classification
- Domain: Eukaryota
- Kingdom: Animalia
- Phylum: Arthropoda
- Class: Insecta
- Order: Lepidoptera
- Family: Gelechiidae
- Genus: Idiophantis
- Species: I. hemiphaea

Binomial name
- Idiophantis hemiphaea Meyrick, 1907

Species of moth

Idiophantis hemiphaea is a moth of the family Gelechiidae. It was described by Edward Meyrick in 1907. It is found in Assam, India.

The wingspan is 13–16 mm. The forewings are pale ochreous, the costal half from the base to the posterior streaks are suffused with rather dark fuscous, darkest towards the base. There are two fine oblique whitish posteriorly black-edged streaks, the first meeting a very undefined erect line of pale bronzy-metallic and blackish scales from the dorsum before the tornal prominence, the second running into the apex. The tornal prominence beyond this line is suffused with coppery metallic on the margins. There is a black dot at the base of the excavation. The hindwings are grey.
