= Tonica argessa =

Scientific classification
- Kingdom: Animalia
- Phylum: Arthropoda
- Class: Insecta
- Order: Lepidoptera
- Family: Depressariidae
- Genus: Tonica
- Species: T. argessa

Binomial name
- Tonica argessa Diakonoff, 1967

Species of moth

Tonica argessa is a moth in the family Depressariidae. It was first described by Alexey Diakonoff in 1968. It is found on Luzon in the Philippines.

The wingspan is 30–32 mm. The forewings are white with a creamy tinge. The upper half is sparsely strewn with sordid pale ochreous-greyish dots and a few dark brown minute scales. There is a transverse almost straight crest of raised scales, mixed with sordid pale ochreous greyish and tawny, becoming slightly broader downwards, from the upper edge of the cell to the middle of the fold and a minute ochreous-greyish tuft on the base of vein six. There is also a straight streak of less glossy scales well before termen. The hindwings are yellowish white, with a silky gloss.
