= Tonica nigrimarginata =

Scientific classification
- Kingdom: Animalia
- Phylum: Arthropoda
- Class: Insecta
- Order: Lepidoptera
- Family: Depressariidae
- Genus: Tonica
- Species: T. nigrimarginata

Binomial name
- Tonica nigrimarginata Diakonoff, 1954

Species of moth

Tonica nigrimarginata is a moth in the family Depressariidae. It was described by Alexey Diakonoff in 1954. It is found in New Guinea.
