= Tonica senescens =

Scientific classification
- Kingdom: Animalia
- Phylum: Arthropoda
- Class: Insecta
- Order: Lepidoptera
- Family: Depressariidae
- Genus: Tonica
- Species: T. senescens

Binomial name
- Tonica senescens Meyrick, 1910

Species of moth

Tonica senescens is a moth in the family Depressariidae. It was described by Edward Meyrick in 1910. It is found on New Guinea.

The wingspan is 20–22 mm. The forewings are whitish ochreous mixed or suffused with light brownish, more or less strewn with blackish scales tending to be arranged in longitudinal lines. The stigmata is represented by tufts of mixed brownish and whitish-ochreous scales and the prominences of the costa are marked with similar tufts. There is an angulated transverse series of small tufts about four-fifths, and others along the termen. The hindwings are grey.
