= Tonica cyanodoxa =

Scientific classification
- Kingdom: Animalia
- Phylum: Arthropoda
- Class: Insecta
- Order: Lepidoptera
- Family: Depressariidae
- Genus: Tonica
- Species: T. cyanodoxa

Binomial name
- Tonica cyanodoxa Meyrick, 1924

Species of moth

Tonica cyanodoxa is a moth in the family Depressariidae. It was described by Edward Meyrick in 1924. It is found on New Guinea.

The wingspan is 41–44 mm. The forewings are pale ochreous, with several large ochreous-whitish tufts partly representing the stigmata and a curved subterminal series of smaller tufts. There is an irregular triangular patch of dark indigo blue on the basal fourth of the costa, including one or two spots of ground colour. The costal edge is suffused with ochreous orange to the apex. The hindwings are blackish grey, the costal fourth light ochreous.
