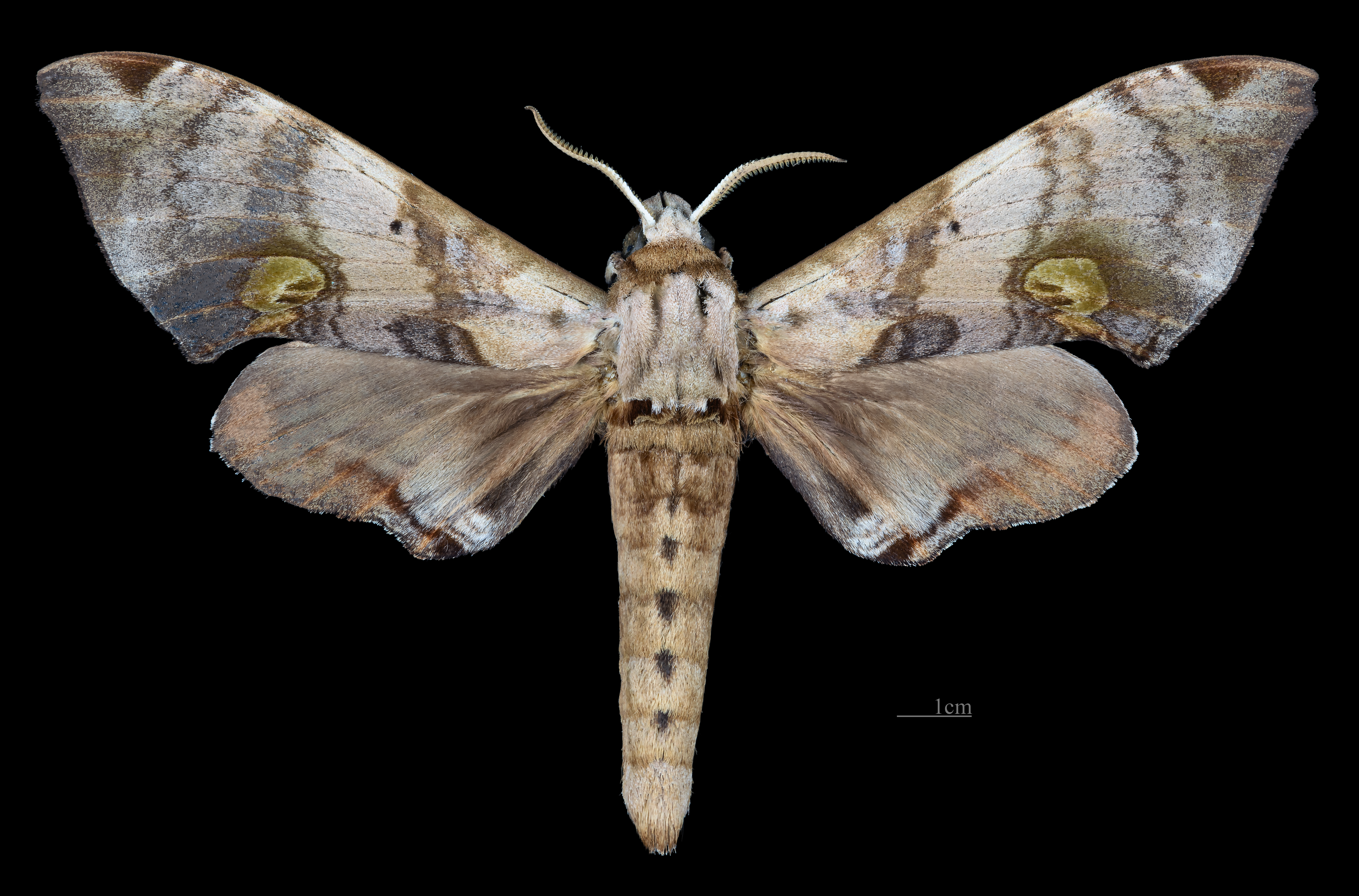
- Daphnusa sinocontinentalis male upperside, Thailand
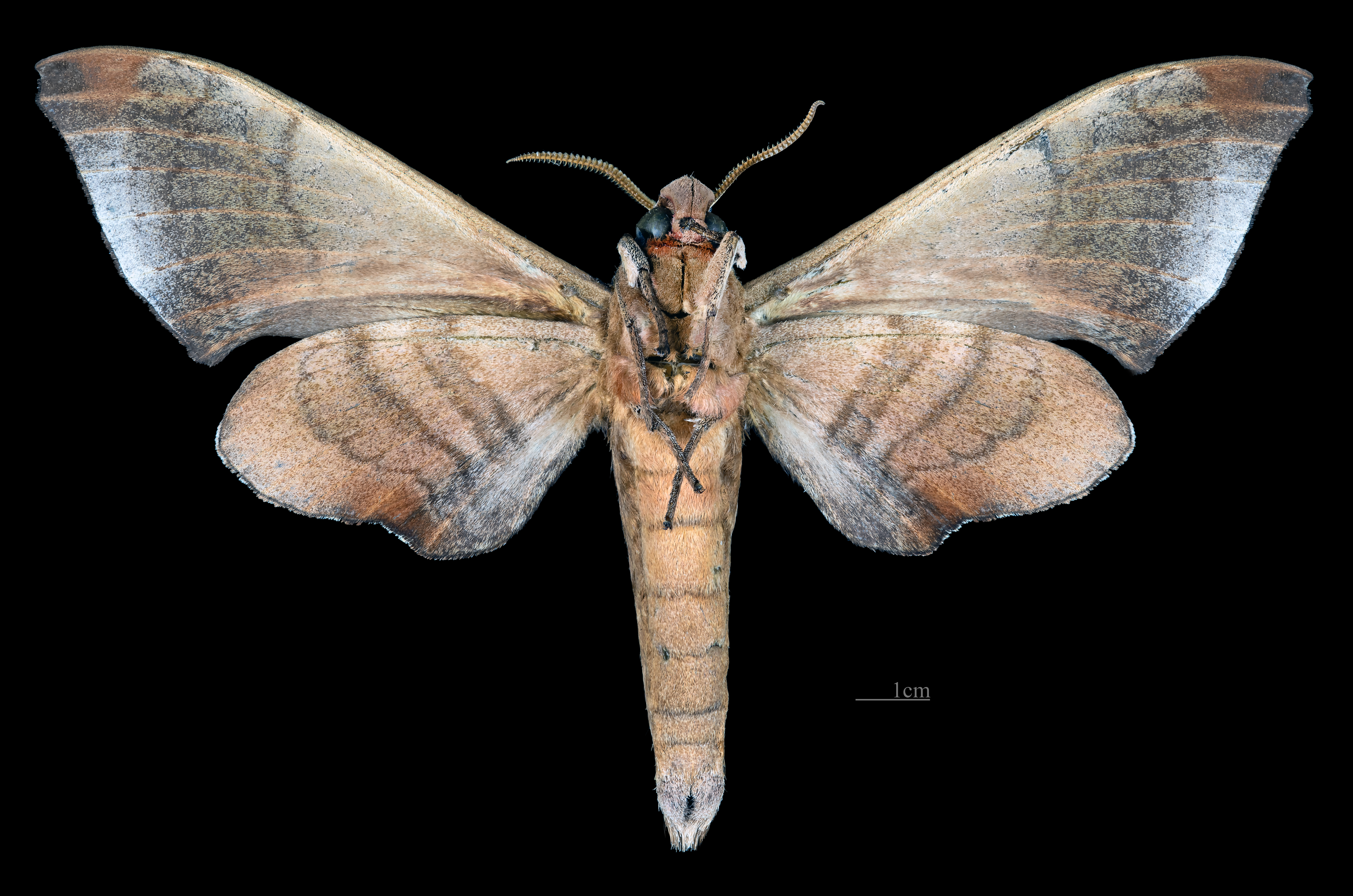
- Daphnusa sinocontinentalis male underside, Thailand

Scientific classification
- Kingdom: Animalia
- Phylum: Arthropoda
- Class: Insecta
- Order: Lepidoptera
- Family: Sphingidae
- Genus: Daphnusa
- Species: D. sinocontinentalis

Binomial name
- Daphnusa sinocontinentalis Brechlin, 2009

= Daphnusa sinocontinentalis =

Species of moth

Daphnusa sinocontinentalis is a species of moth of the family Sphingidae. It is known from south-east Asia, including Thailand.
