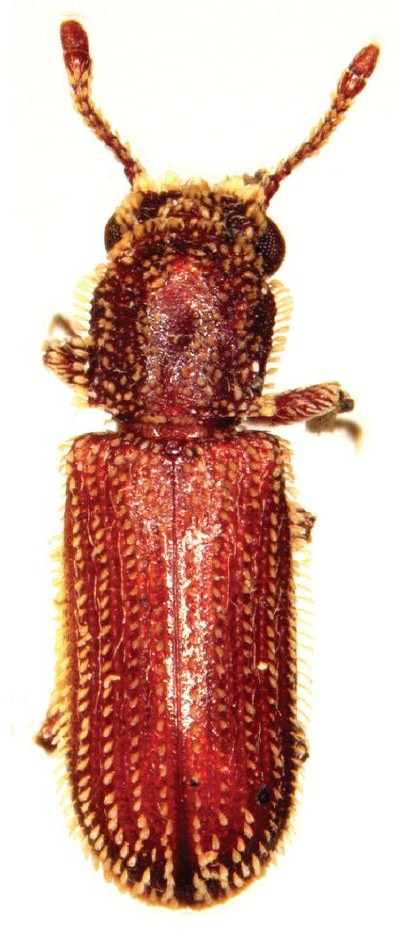

Scientific classification
- Domain: Eukaryota
- Kingdom: Animalia
- Phylum: Arthropoda
- Class: Insecta
- Order: Coleoptera
- Suborder: Polyphaga
- Family: Bostrichidae
- Tribe: Lyctini
- Genus: Minthea
- Species: M. reticulata

Binomial name
- Minthea reticulata Lesne, 1931

= Minthea reticulata =

Species of beetle

Minthea reticulata is a species of powder-post beetle in the family Bostrichidae. It is found in Australia, Europe and Northern Asia (excluding China), North America, and Southern Asia.

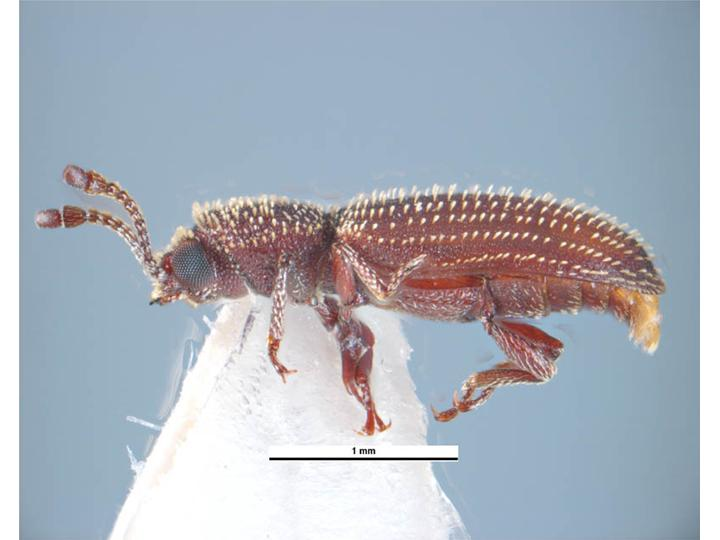
