= Tonica malthacodes =

Scientific classification
- Kingdom: Animalia
- Phylum: Arthropoda
- Class: Insecta
- Order: Lepidoptera
- Family: Depressariidae
- Genus: Tonica
- Species: T. malthacodes

Binomial name
- Tonica malthacodes Meyrick, 1914

Species of moth

Tonica malthacodes is a moth in the family Depressariidae. It was described by Edward Meyrick in 1914. It is found on New Guinea.

The wingspan is about 20 mm. The forewings are whitish ochreous, the costal edge infuscated towards one-fourth and the plical stigma represented by a large tuft of scales. There are three or four dots of raised fuscous and dark fuscous scales beneath the costa posteriorly and the apical edge is infuscated. The hindwings are whitish.
