= Tonica lagaropis =

Scientific classification
- Kingdom: Animalia
- Phylum: Arthropoda
- Class: Insecta
- Order: Lepidoptera
- Family: Depressariidae
- Genus: Tonica
- Species: T. lagaropis

Binomial name
- Tonica lagaropis Meyrick, 1928

Species of moth

Tonica lagaropis is a moth in the family Depressariidae. It was described by Edward Meyrick in 1928. It is found on Luzon in the Philippines.

The wingspan is about 29 mm. The forewings are creamy white, with raised tufts touched with yellowish. The costal edge has a brown streak with an elongate dark brown subcostal mark at three-fifths. Along the posterior third of the costa, this streak is interrupted three times by white raised tufts. There is fine sprinkling of shades of brown, arranged more or less in longitudinal rows, parallel to the veins below the costa and there is some finer, blackish speckling below the posterior part of the costa and in the apex. The hindwings are glossy creamy white, toward the costa and apex very faintly speckled with pale brownish.
