= Idiophantis disparata =

Scientific classification
- Domain: Eukaryota
- Kingdom: Animalia
- Phylum: Arthropoda
- Class: Insecta
- Order: Lepidoptera
- Family: Gelechiidae
- Genus: Idiophantis
- Species: I. disparata

Binomial name
- Idiophantis disparata Meyrick, 1923

Species of moth

Idiophantis disparata is a moth of the family Gelechiidae. It was described by Edward Meyrick in 1923. It is found on Fiji.

The wingspan is about 10 mm. The forewings are ochreous greyish, the anterior two-thirds suffused with whitish and with five dark fuscous marks in a row beneath the fold from the base to the middle of the wing, two oblique above the fold continuing the third and fourth of these, and one towards the costa at one-fifth. The costal edge is white from near the base to near the apex and there is an oblique irregular dark fuscous streak from the middle of the costa reaching halfway across the wing. There are three very oblique black strigulae from the costa posteriorly, between the first and second a very oblique white streak reaching halfway across the wing. A suffused whitish line is found along the posterior part of the dorsum and termen, edged posteriorly above by a curved black streak. The apical projection is linear and upturned. The hindwings are grey.
