= Tonica barrowi =

Scientific classification
- Kingdom: Animalia
- Phylum: Arthropoda
- Class: Insecta
- Order: Lepidoptera
- Family: Depressariidae
- Genus: Tonica
- Species: T. barrowi

Binomial name
- Tonica barrowi (Bingham, 1907)

Synonyms
- Binsitta barrowi Bingham, 1907

Species of moth

Tonica barrowi is a moth in the family Depressariidae. It was described by Charles Thomas Bingham in 1907. It is found in Myanmar.

The wingspan is about 78 mm. The forewings are white with a shining silky gloss and black markings, consisting of a large square spot near the base of the costa, a larger rectangular patch just beyond, a border along the apical half of the costal margin. The apical third of the hindwings is shaded with shining bronzy brown, darkening outwards and changing to metallic purple on the costal margin and apex.
