= Idiophantis valerieae =

Scientific classification
- Domain: Eukaryota
- Kingdom: Animalia
- Phylum: Arthropoda
- Class: Insecta
- Order: Lepidoptera
- Family: Gelechiidae
- Genus: Idiophantis
- Species: I. valerieae

Binomial name
- Idiophantis valerieae Guillermet, 2010

Species of moth

Idiophantis valerieae is a moth of the family Gelechiidae. It is found on La Réunion. Larvae of this species feed on Syzygium cymosum.
