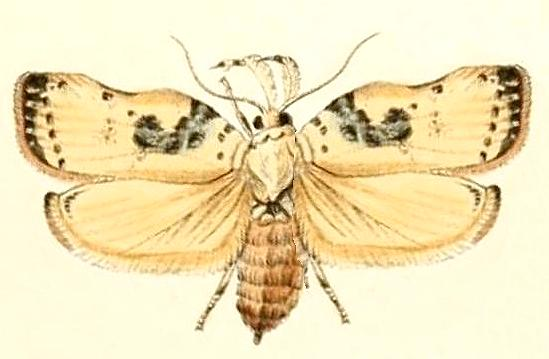
- Tonica effractella

Scientific classification
- Kingdom: Animalia
- Phylum: Arthropoda
- Class: Insecta
- Order: Lepidoptera
- Family: Depressariidae
- Subfamily: Depressariinae
- Genus: Tonica; Walker, 1864

Synonyms
- Binsitta Walker, 1864; Teratomorpha Turner, 1896; Cononia Snellen, 1901

= Tonica (moth) =

Genus of moths

Tonica is a genus of moths of the family Depressariidae.

== Species ==
- Tonica argessa Diakonoff, 1967
- Tonica barrowi Bingham, 1907
- Tonica centroluta Diakonoff, 1966
- Tonica citrantha Diakonoff, 1967
- Tonica cyanodoxa Meyrick, 1924
- Tonica effractella Snellen, 1879
- Tonica gypsopis Meyrick, 1928
- Tonica lagaropis Meyrick, 1928
- Tonica malthacodes Meyrick, 1914
- Tonica melanoglypha Diakonoff, 1966
- Tonica mixogama Meyrick, 1928
- Tonica nigricostella Snellen, 1901
- Tonica nigrimarginata Diakonoff, 1954
- Tonica niviferana Walker, 1864
- Tonica peripsacas Diakonoff, 1966
- Tonica pharmacis Diakonoff, 1966
- Tonica senescens Meyrick, 1910
- Tonica syngnoma Diakonoff, 1966
- Tonica terasella Walker, 1864
