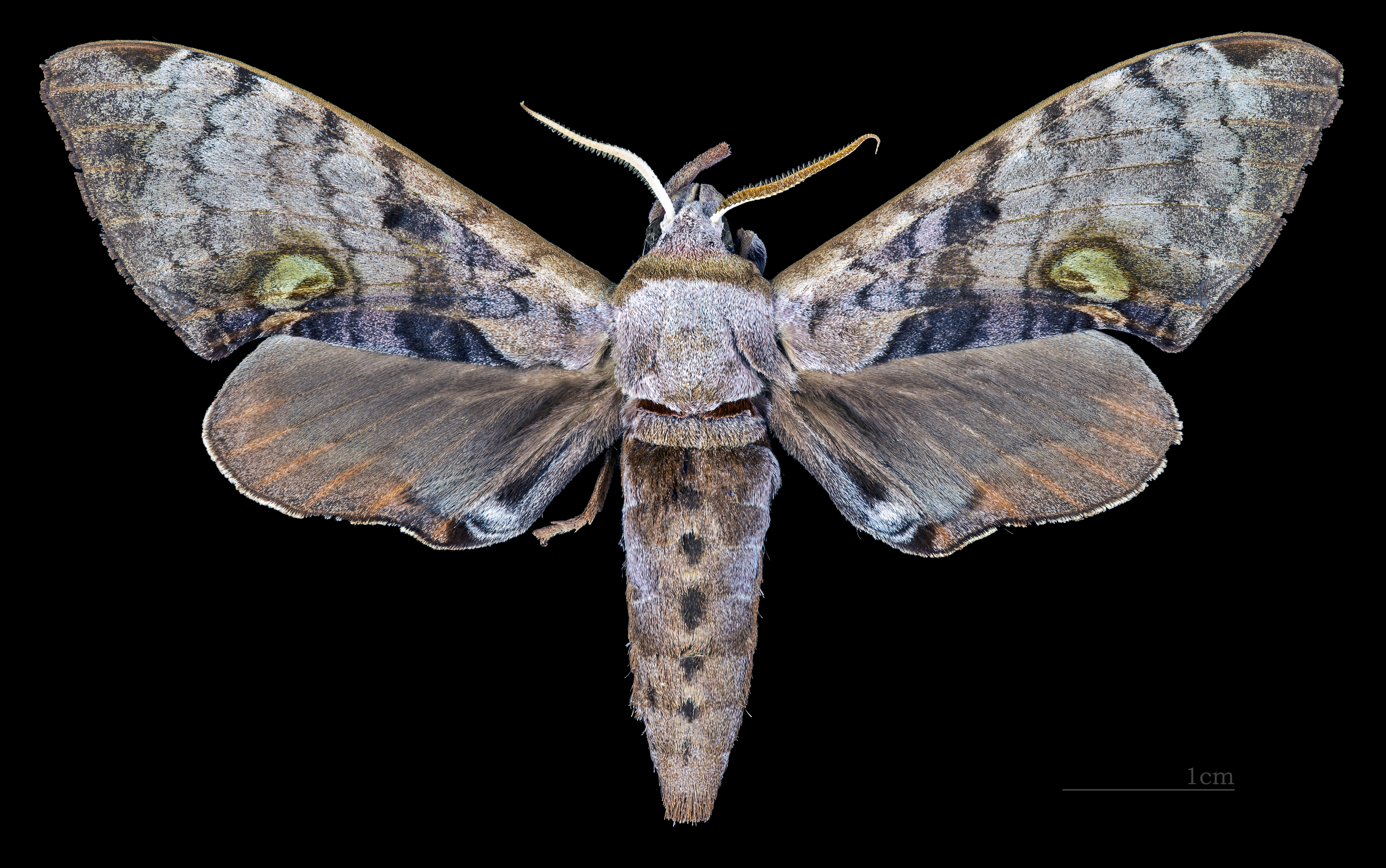
- Daphnusa ocellaris

Scientific classification
- Domain: Eukaryota
- Kingdom: Animalia
- Phylum: Arthropoda
- Class: Insecta
- Order: Lepidoptera
- Family: Sphingidae
- Tribe: Smerinthini
- Genus: Daphnusa; Walker, 1856

Synonyms
- Allodaphnusa Huwe, 1895

= Daphnusa =

Genus of moths

Daphnusa is a genus of moths in the family Sphingidae erected by Francis Walker in 1856.

== Species ==
- Daphnusa ailanti (Boisduval, 1875)
- Daphnusa ocellaris Walker, 1856
- Daphnusa philippinensis Brechlin, 2009
- Daphnusa sinocontinentalis Brechlin, 2009
- Daphnusa zythum Haxaire & Melichar, 2009
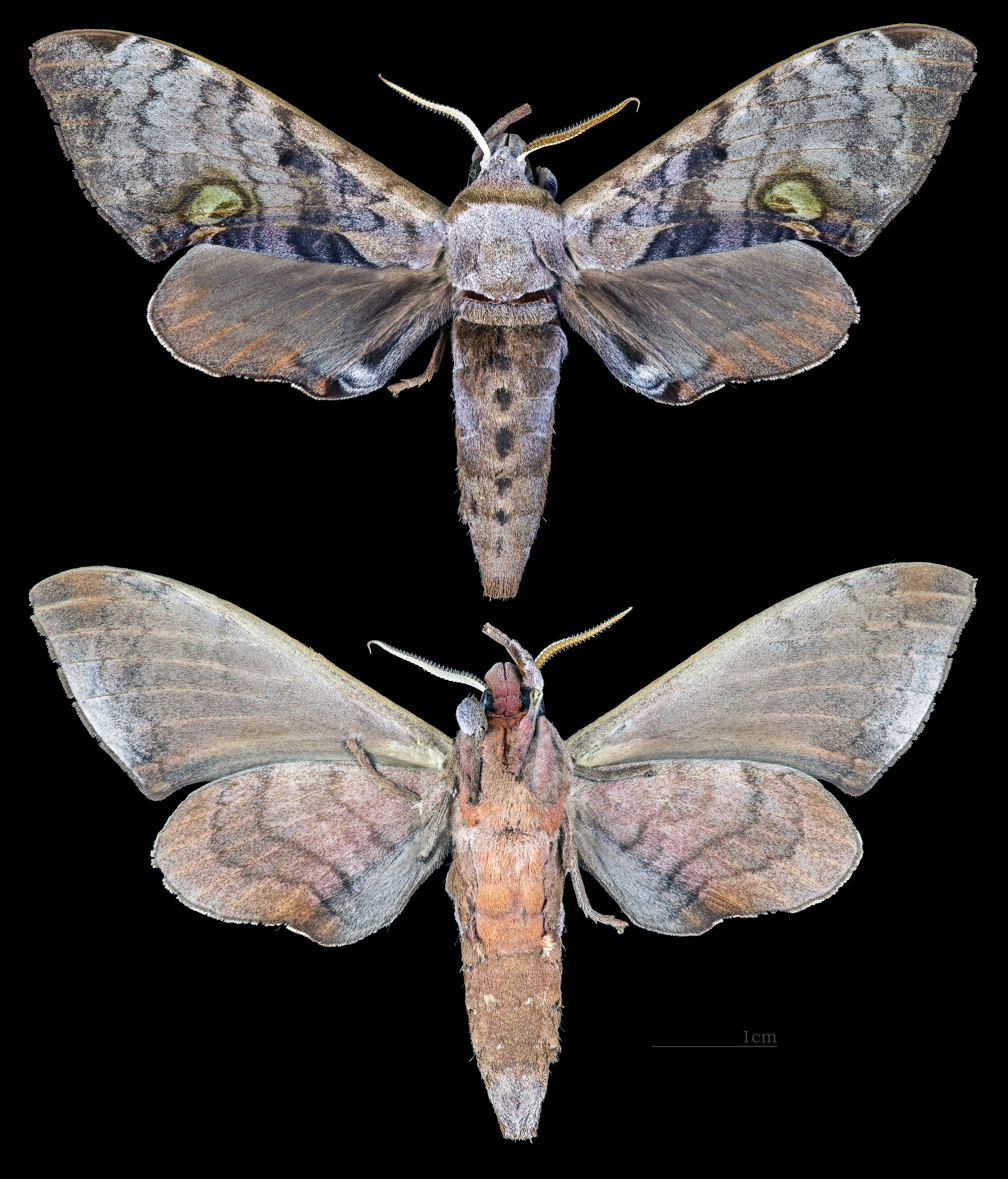
Daphnusa ocellaris

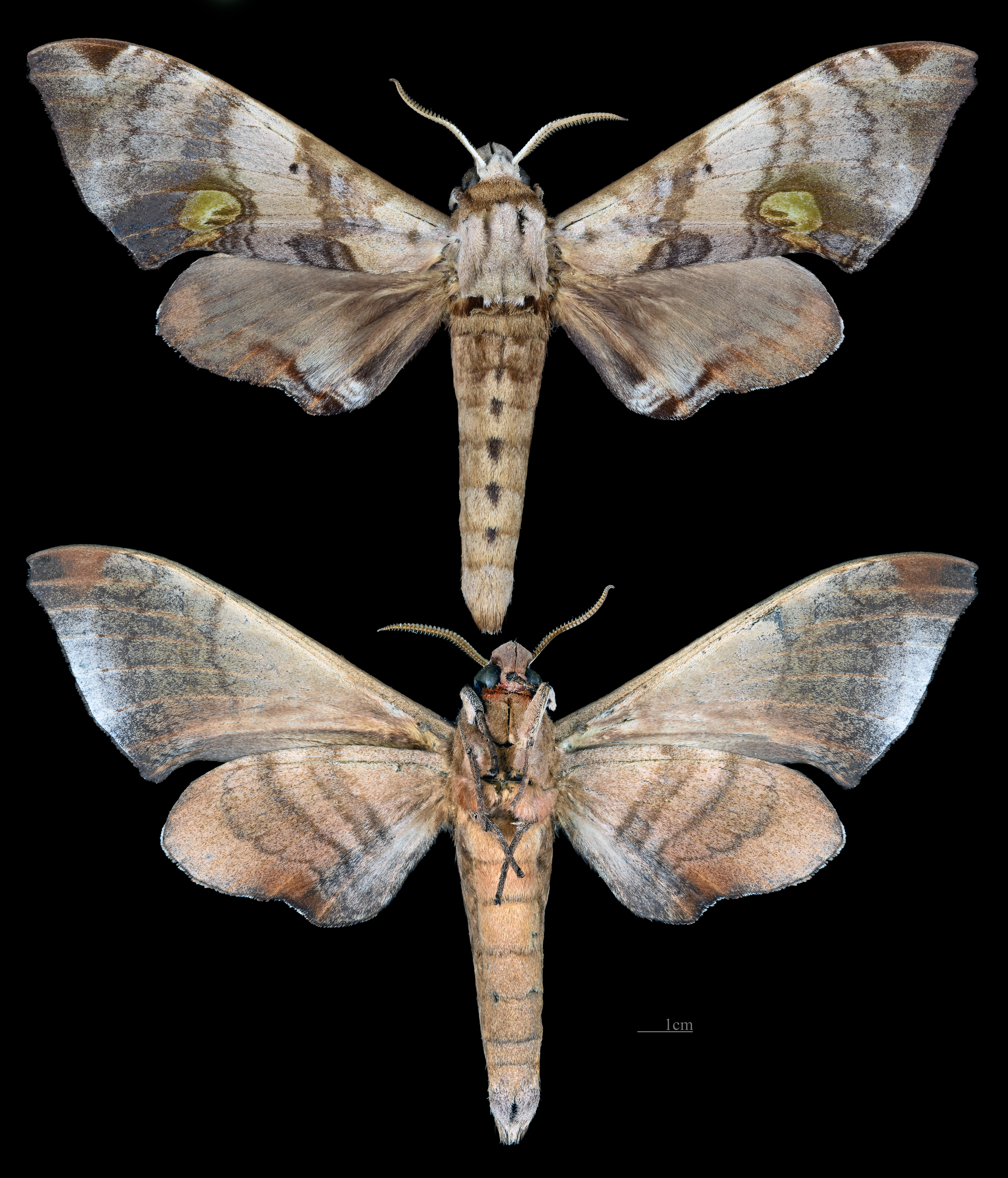
Daphnusa sinocontinentalis
