= Idiophantis =

Scientific classification
- Kingdom: Animalia
- Phylum: Arthropoda
- Class: Insecta
- Order: Lepidoptera
- Family: Gelechiidae
- Subfamily: Anacampsinae
- Genus: Idiophantis; Meyrick, 1904

Type species
- Idiophantis habrias Meyrick, 1904

Synonyms
- Colobodes Meyrick, 1904

Genus of moths

Idiophantis is a genus of moths in the family Gelechiidae.

== Species ==
The species of this genus are:

- Idiophantis acanthopa Meyrick, 1931 (from India)
- Idiophantis anisosticta Meyrick, 1916 (from Sri Lanka)
- Idiophantis callicarpa Meyrick, 1927 (from Samoa)
- Idiophantis carpotoma Meyrick, 1916 (from India)
- Idiophantis chalcura Meyrick, 1907 (from India)
- Idiophantis chiridota Meyrick, 1914 (India, Sri Lanka, Indonesia)
- Idiophantis croconota Meyrick, 1918 (from Madagascar)
- Idiophantis discura Meyrick, 1907 (from Sri Lanka)
- Idiophantis disparata Meyrick, 1923 (from Fiji)
- Idiophantis eugeniae Bradley, 1969 (Papua New Guinea)
- Idiophantis habrias Meyrick, 1904 (from Australia)
- Idiophantis hemiphaea Meyrick, 1907 (from India)
- Idiophantis insomnis (Meyrick, 1904) (from Australia)
- Idiophantis lomatographa Bradley, 1962 (from New Hebrides)
- Idiophantis maelamunensis Moriuti, 1993 (from Thailand)
- Idiophantis melanosacta Meyrick, 1907 (from India and Thailand)
- Idiophantis pandata Bradley, 1961 (from Guadalcanal)
- Idiophantis paraptila Meyrick, 1916 (from Sri Lanka)
- Idiophantis soreuta Meyrick, 1906 (from Thailand and Sri Lanka)
- Idiophantis spectrata Meyrick, 1911 (from Seychelles)
- Idiophantis stoica Meyrick, 1911 (from India)
- Idiophantis thiopeda Meyrick, 1931 (Papua New Guinea)
- Idiophantis valerieae Guillermet, 2010 (La Réunion)
