= Idiophantis croconota =

Scientific classification
- Domain: Eukaryota
- Kingdom: Animalia
- Phylum: Arthropoda
- Class: Insecta
- Order: Lepidoptera
- Family: Gelechiidae
- Genus: Idiophantis
- Species: I. croconota

Binomial name
- Idiophantis croconota Meyrick, 1918

Species of moth

Idiophantis croconota is a moth of the family Gelechiidae. It was described by Edward Meyrick in 1918. It is found in Madagascar and Réunion.

The wingspan is about 14 mm. The forewings are fuscous with a rather broad light ochreous-yellow dorsal stripe throughout, the edge is broadly prominent at about two-thirds, where it reaches halfway across the wing, narrowed towards the tornus. There is a curved dark grey line from four-fifths of the costa to the tornus, edged anteriorly by a light greyish line becoming stronger and white towards the costa, preceded towards the costa by an obscure ochreous dark-edged line. The area beyond this is light ochreous yellow, marked on the upper part of the tornal prominence with a dark bronzy spot containing a round black dot, the apical projection is suffused with grey and contains a white longitudinal mark. The hindwings are grey, lighter anteriorly.

The larvae feed on Syzygium cumini and Syzygium jambos.
