= Tonica citrantha =

Scientific classification
- Kingdom: Animalia
- Phylum: Arthropoda
- Class: Insecta
- Order: Lepidoptera
- Family: Depressariidae
- Genus: Tonica
- Species: T. citrantha

Binomial name
- Tonica citrantha Diakonoff, 1967

Species of moth

Tonica citrantha is a moth in the family Depressariidae. It was described by Alexey Diakonoff in 1967. It is found on Luzon in the Philippines.

The wingspan is about 37 mm. The forewings are white with the faintest yellowish suffusion along the middle of the wing and beyond the cell. There are two large raised pale yellow scale tufts and two smaller white scale tufts alternating with the other, as well as two highly raised but loose tufts below the upper edge of the cell toward the base, with the upper half dark brown, the lower white and some brown scales scattered between these. The other markings are jet black, consisting of a costal irregular, and a median quadrate spot at the base, a wedge-shaped oblique larger mark at one-sixth of the costa and a round dot below the fold at one-fifth. There is also an irregular dark grey mark on two-thirds of the costa and a patch of irregular jet-black irroration with bluish reflections in the apex. A curved series of brownish-grey raised scales is found before the upper part of the termen. The hindwings are glossy golden whitish, irrorated with pale tawny. The extreme apex is suffused with jet black.
