= Idiophantis soreuta =

Scientific classification
- Domain: Eukaryota
- Kingdom: Animalia
- Phylum: Arthropoda
- Class: Insecta
- Order: Lepidoptera
- Family: Gelechiidae
- Genus: Idiophantis
- Species: I. soreuta

Binomial name
- Idiophantis soreuta Meyrick, 1906

Species of moth

Idiophantis soreuta is a moth of the family Gelechiidae. It was described by Edward Meyrick in 1906. It is found in Sri Lanka.

The wingspan is 13–14 mm. The forewings are pale brownish ochreous, towards the apex yellowish tinged and with a dark fuscous patch extending along the costa from the base to two-thirds, not reaching halfway across the wing, the lower edge with two short darker rounded prominences before the middle, the posterior edge straight, oblique. There are a few variable scattered dark fuscous dots or dashes between this and the dorsum, as well as a fine whitish fuscous-edged line from three-fourths of the costa to the dorsum before the tornus, right-angled above the middle with the arms subsinuate. A whitish streak is found along the costa towards the apex, edged with fuscous beneath. There is also a small dark metallic-bronze spot on the termen beneath the middle. The hindwings are fuscous.
