= Idiophantis eugeniae =

Scientific classification
- Domain: Eukaryota
- Kingdom: Animalia
- Phylum: Arthropoda
- Class: Insecta
- Order: Lepidoptera
- Family: Gelechiidae
- Genus: Idiophantis
- Species: I. eugeniae

Binomial name
- Idiophantis eugeniae Bradley, 1969

Species of moth

Idiophantis eugeniae is a moth of the family Gelechiidae. It was described by John David Bradley in 1969 and is found in New Ireland in Papua New Guinea.
