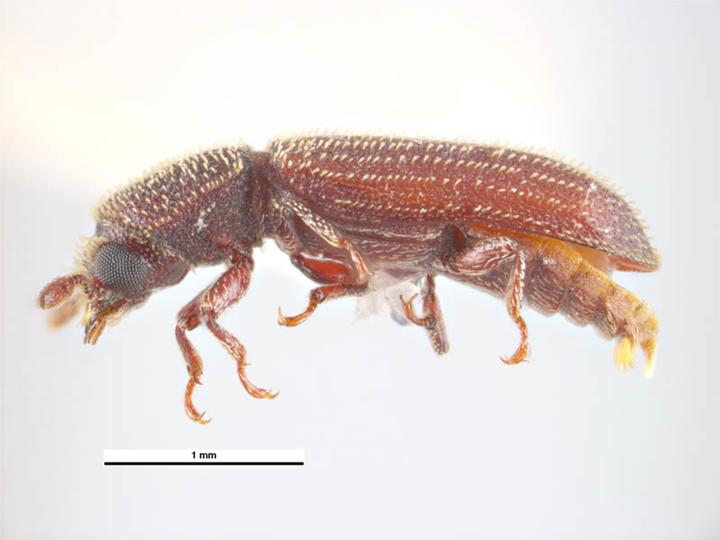
- Minthea obsita

Scientific classification
- Kingdom: Animalia
- Phylum: Arthropoda
- Class: Insecta
- Order: Coleoptera
- Suborder: Polyphaga
- Family: Bostrichidae
- Subfamily: Lyctinae
- Tribe: Lyctini
- Genus: Minthea; Pascoe, 1863

= Minthea =

Genus of beetles

Minthea is a genus of tropical powderpost beetles in the family Bostrichidae. There are about eight described species in Minthea.

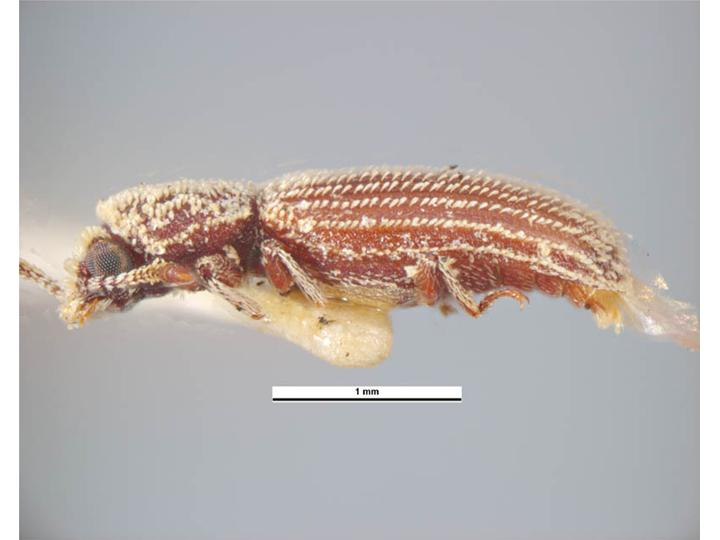
Minthea rugicollis

== Species ==
These eight species belong to the genus Minthea:

- Minthea acanthacollis (Carter & Zeck, 1937)
- Minthea apicata Lesne, 1935
- Minthea bivestita Lesne, 1937
- Minthea humericosta Lesne, 1936
- Minthea obsita (Wollaston, 1867)
- Minthea reticulata Lesne, 1931
- Minthea rugicollis (Walker, 1858) (hairy powderpost beetle)
- Minthea squamigera Pascoe, 1866
