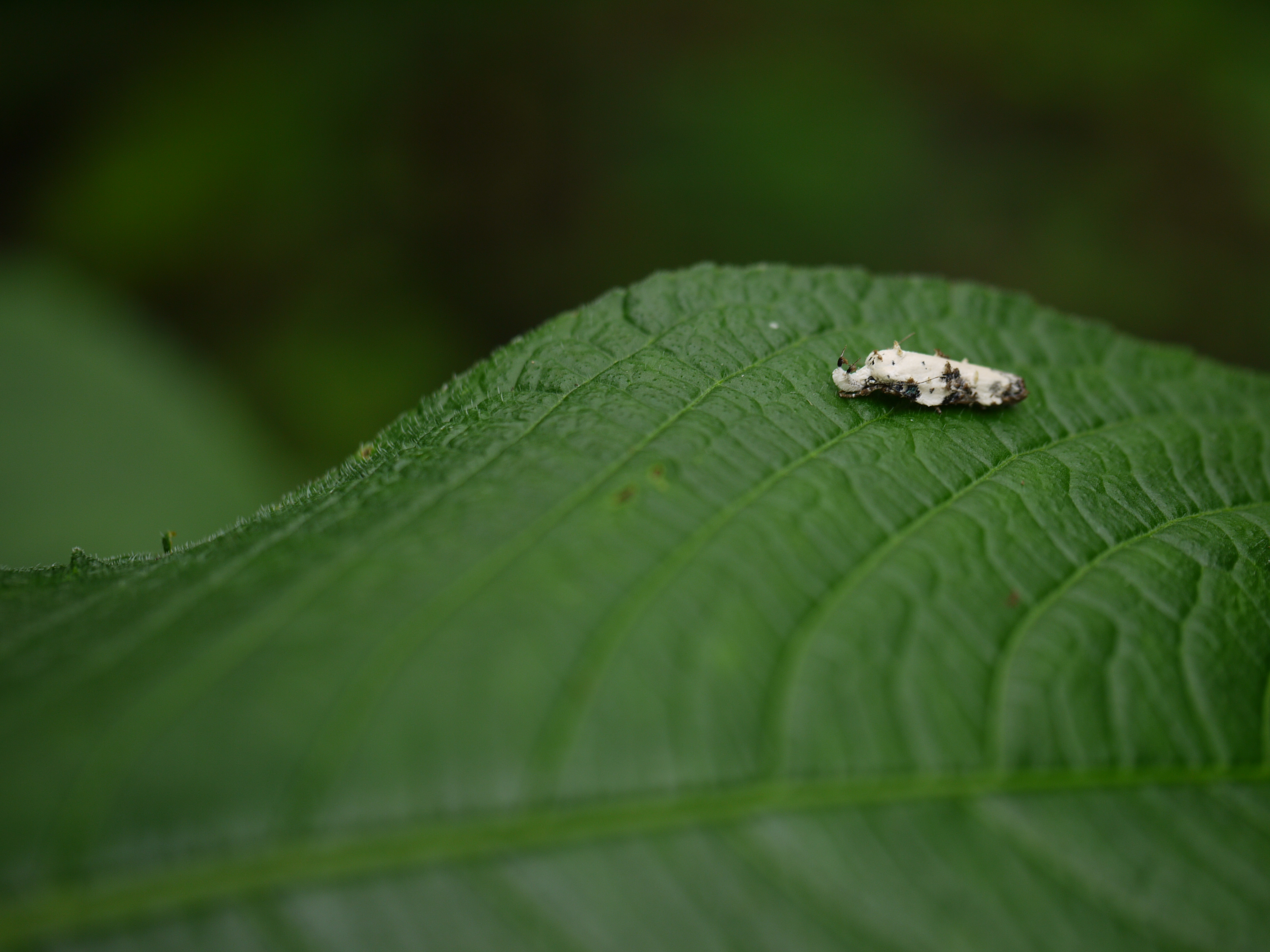
- Tonica niviferana

Scientific classification
- Kingdom: Animalia
- Phylum: Arthropoda
- Class: Insecta
- Order: Lepidoptera
- Family: Depressariidae
- Genus: Tonica
- Species: T. niviferana

Binomial name
- Tonica niviferana (Walker, 1864)

Synonyms
- Binsitta niviferana Walker, 1864

= Tonica niviferana =

Species of moth

Tonica niviferana is a moth in the family Depressariidae. It was described by Francis Walker in 1864. It is found in India, Sri Lanka, northern Vietnam and China.

Adults are white, the forewings with three blue tufts of scales, partly bordered with fawn. There are a few white erect tufts in the disc.
