= Idiophantis insomnis =

Scientific classification
- Domain: Eukaryota
- Kingdom: Animalia
- Phylum: Arthropoda
- Class: Insecta
- Order: Lepidoptera
- Family: Gelechiidae
- Genus: Idiophantis
- Species: I. insomnis

Binomial name
- Idiophantis insomnis (Meyrick, 1904)

Synonyms
- Colobodes insomnis Meyrick, 1904

Species of moth

Idiophantis insomnis is a moth of the family Gelechiidae. It was described by Edward Meyrick in 1904. It is found in Australia, where it has been recorded from New South Wales.

The wingspan is 7–9 mm (0.28–0.35 in). The forewings are light shining bronzy ochreous, irregularly mixed with dark fuscous suffusion, tending to form irregular blotches, especially towards the middle of the disc. There are three fine dark fuscous longitudinal lines beneath the costa on the anterior half and a silvery-metallic line, edged with dark fuscous, from the costa to the tornus, becoming white towards the costa, angulated outwards in the middle. There is also a silvery-metallic subapical dot and a black terminal dot beneath the indentation. The hindwings are light grey, paler towards the base.
