= Daphnusa philippinensis =

Scientific classification
- Kingdom: Animalia
- Phylum: Arthropoda
- Class: Insecta
- Order: Lepidoptera
- Family: Sphingidae
- Genus: Daphnusa
- Species: D. philippinensis

Binomial name
- Daphnusa philippinensis Brechlin, 2009

Species of moth

Daphnusa philippinensis is a species of moth of the family Sphingidae. It is known from the Philippines.
