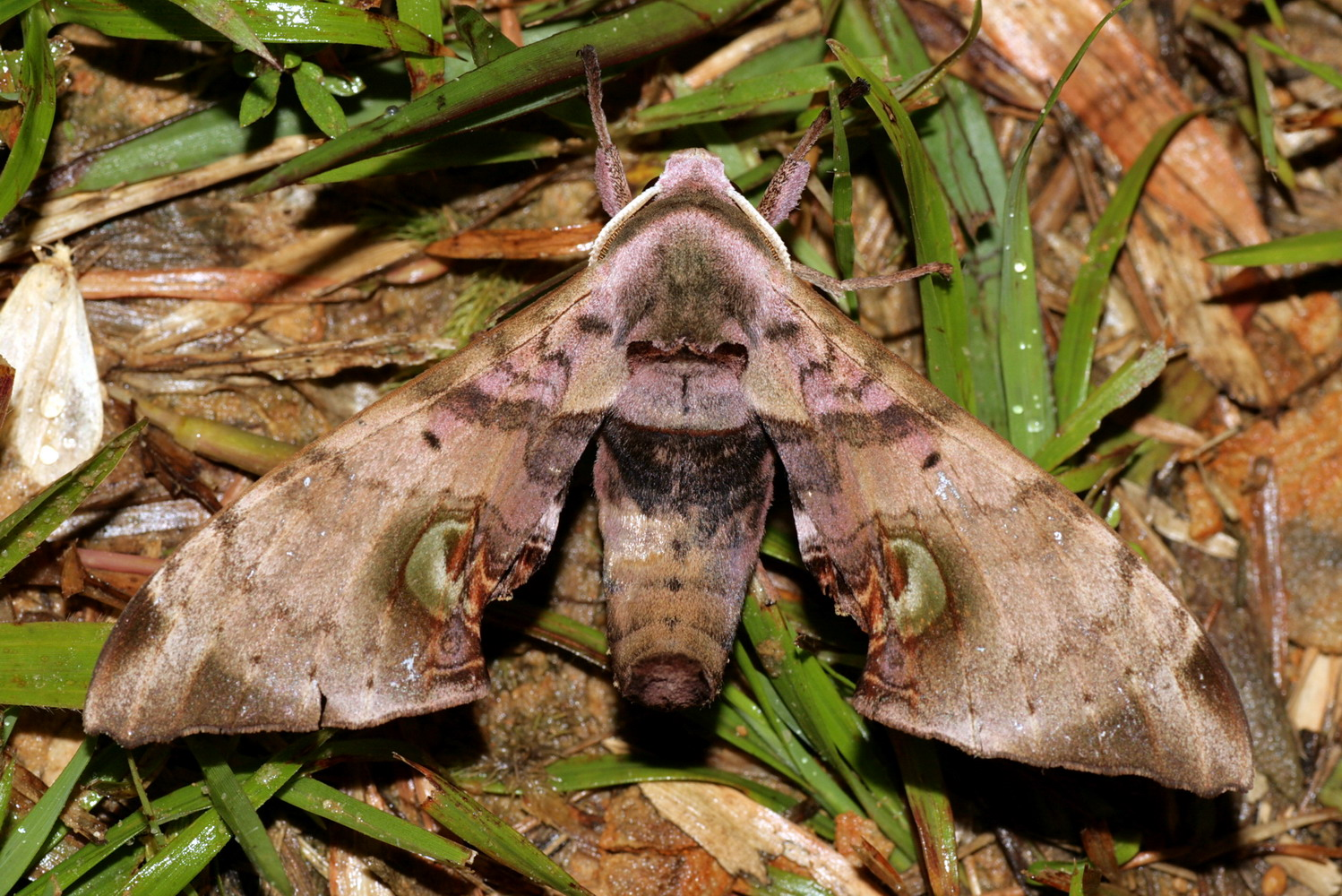

Scientific classification
- Domain: Eukaryota
- Kingdom: Animalia
- Phylum: Arthropoda
- Class: Insecta
- Order: Lepidoptera
- Family: Sphingidae
- Genus: Daphnusa
- Species: D. ocellaris

Binomial name
- Daphnusa ocellaris Walker, 1856

Synonyms
- Daphnusa orbifera Walker, 1862; Smerinthus oculata Boisduval, 1875; Daphnusa oculata (Boisduval, [1875]); Daphnusa fruhstorferi (Huwe, 1895); Allodaphnusa fruhstorferi Huwe, 1895

= Daphnusa ocellaris =

Southeast asian "durian hawkmoth"

Daphnusa ocellaris, the durian hawkmoth, is a species of moth of the family Sphingidae.

== Distribution ==
It is found in Sri Lanka, northern India, Nepal, Thailand, Yunnan in southern China, Malaysia (Peninsular, Sarawak), Indonesia (Sumatra, Java, Kalimantan) and the Philippines. Daphnusa fruhstorferi from Java is sometimes treated as a valid species.

== Description ==
The wingspan is 80–112 mm.

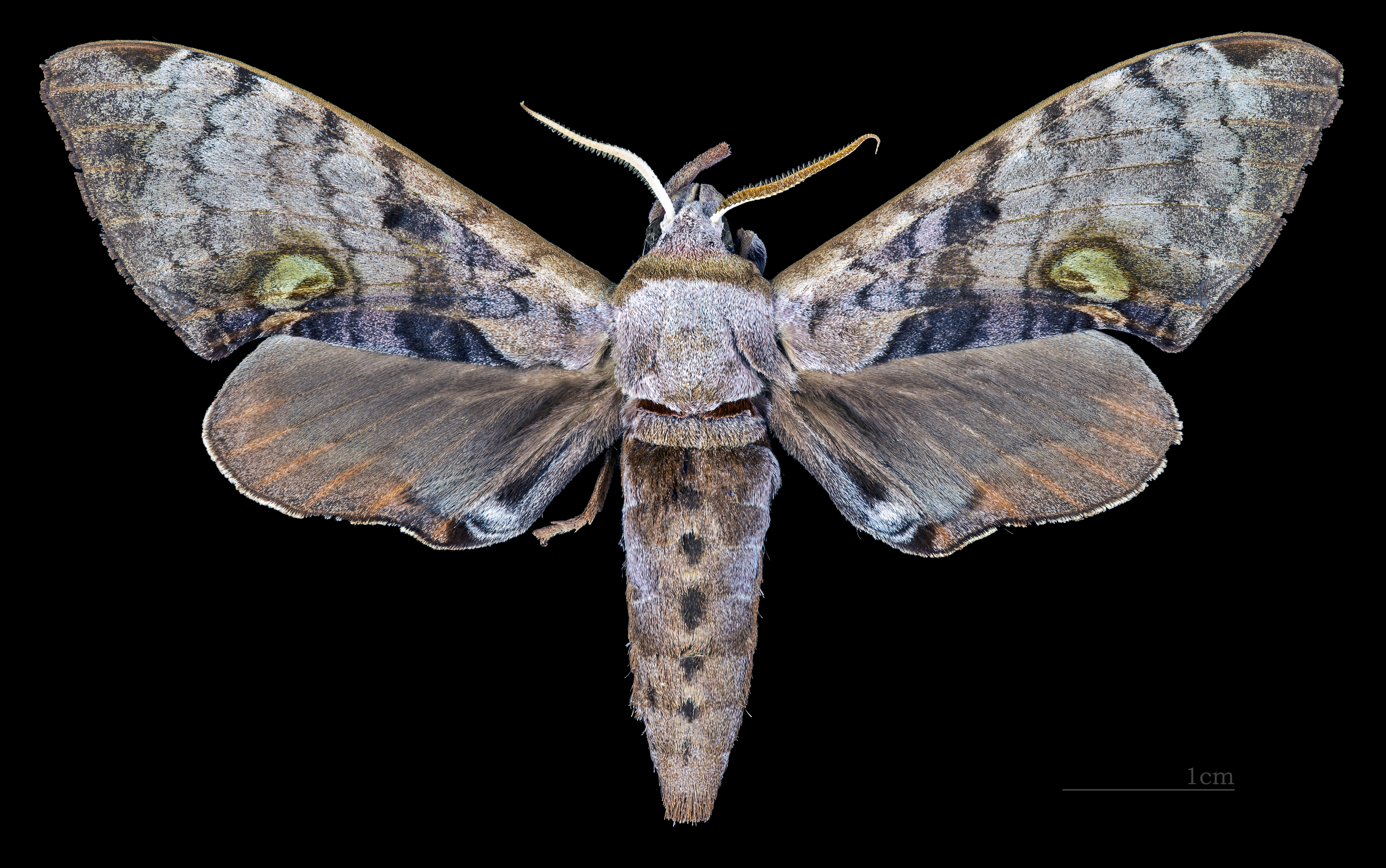
Male dorsal view

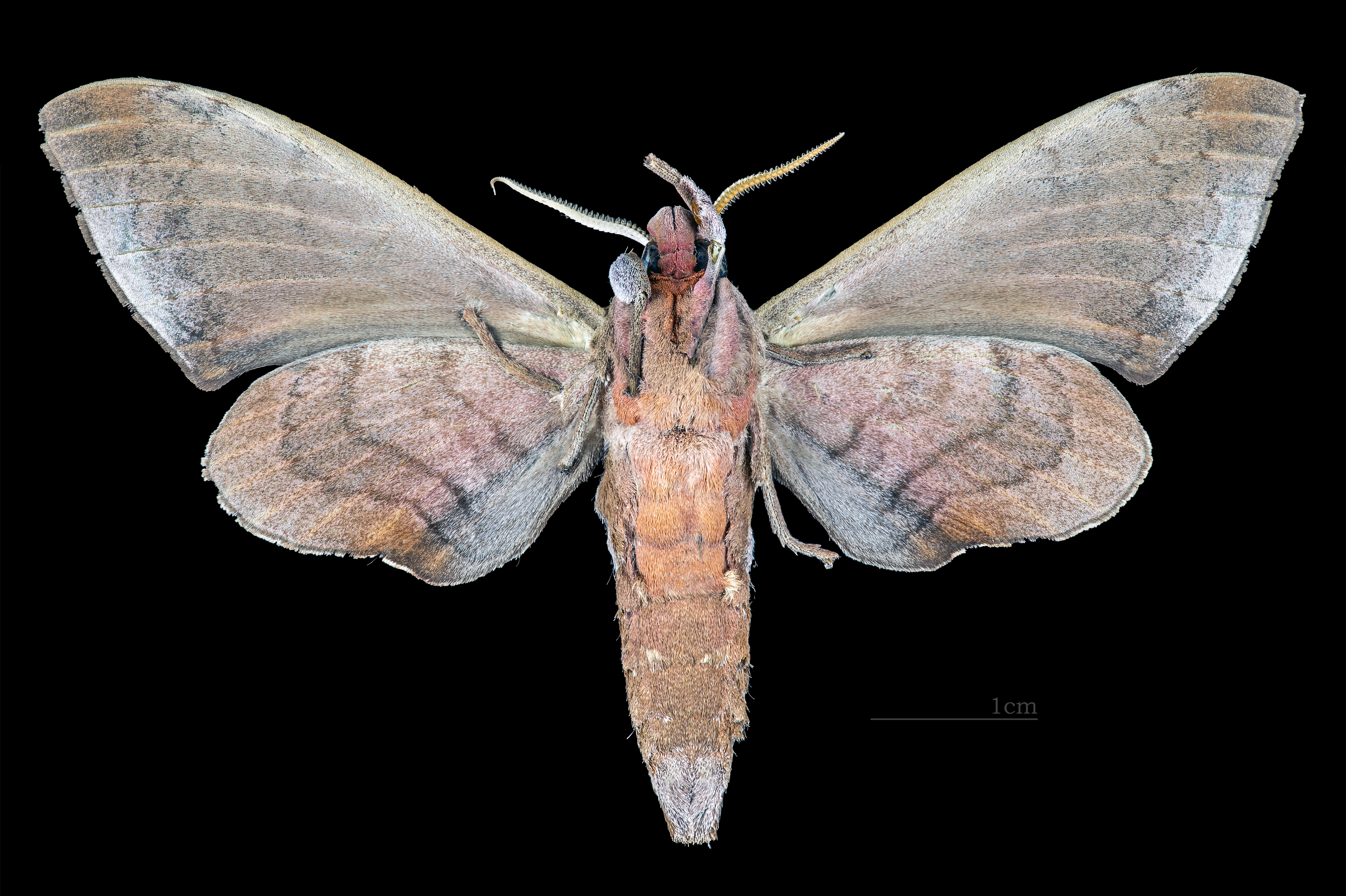
Male ventral view

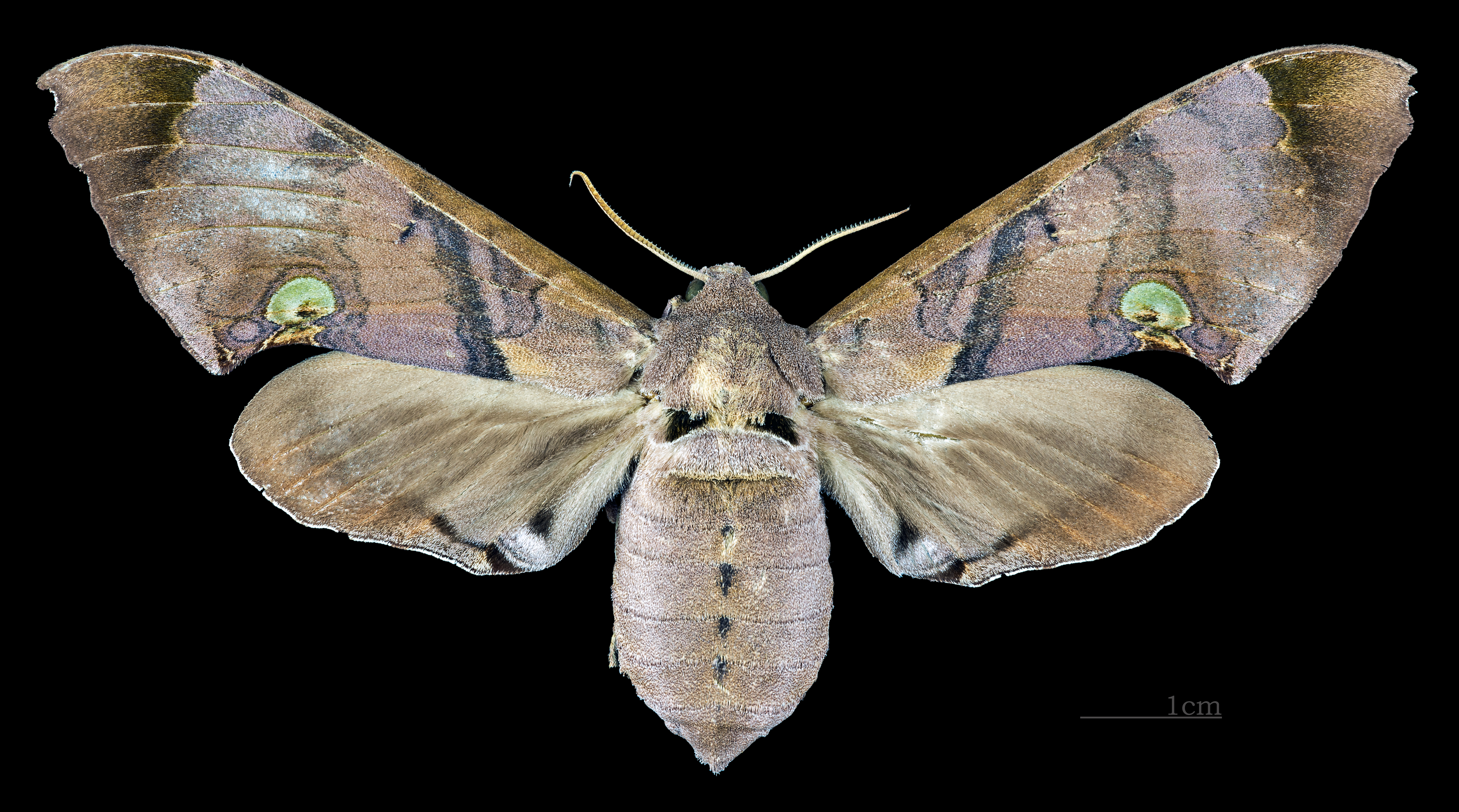
Female dorsal view

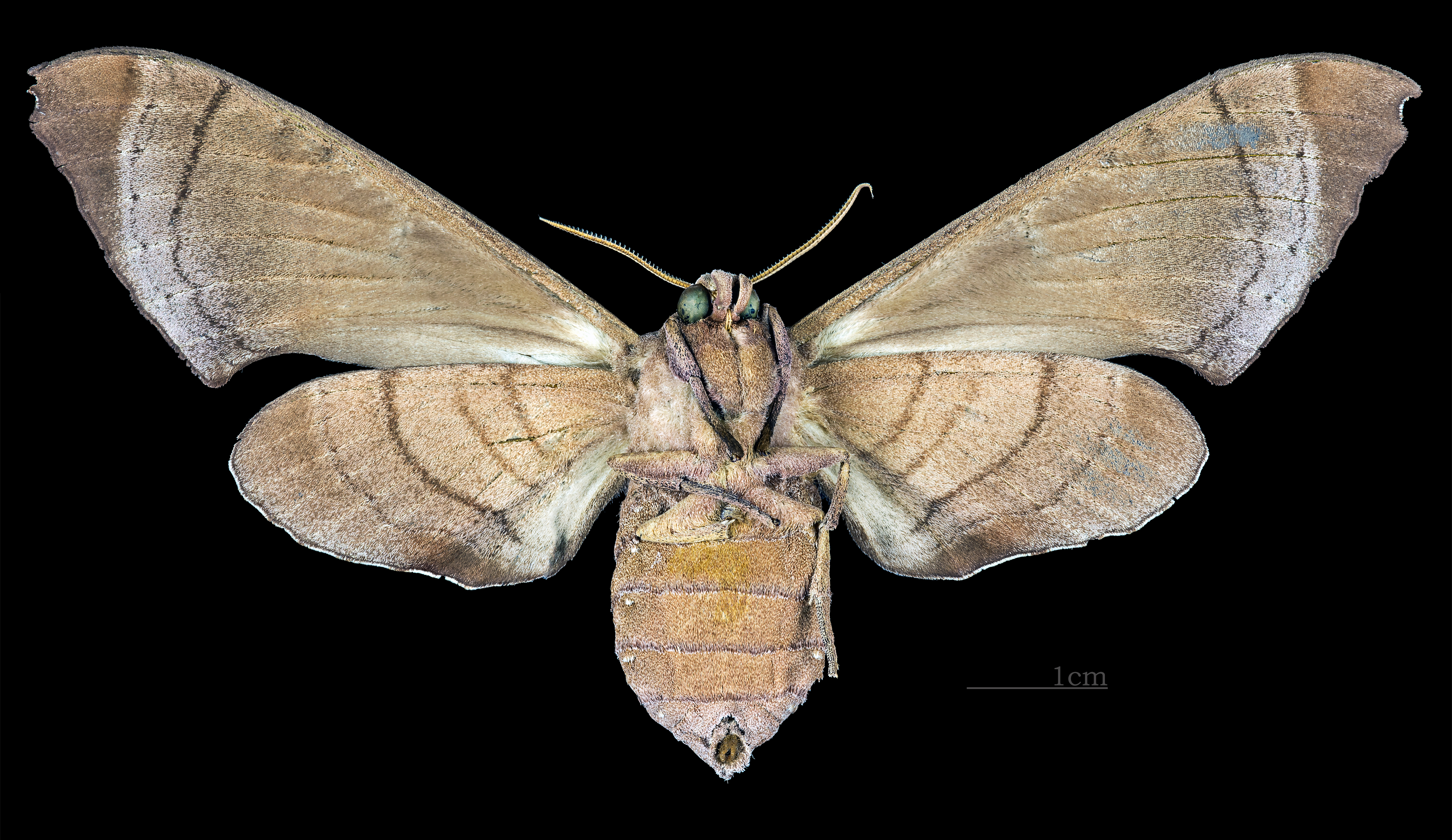
Female ventral view

== Biology ==
The larvae feed on Durio and Nephelium species.
