= Dactylispa leonardi =

Scientific classification
- Kingdom: Animalia
- Phylum: Arthropoda
- Class: Insecta
- Order: Coleoptera
- Suborder: Polyphaga
- Infraorder: Cucujiformia
- Family: Chrysomelidae
- Genus: Dactylispa
- Species: D. leonardi

Binomial name
- Dactylispa leonardi (Ritsema, 1875)

Synonyms
- Hispa leonardi Ritsema, 1875; Dactylispa fleutiauxi Gestro, 1923

Species of beetle

Dactylispa leonardi is a species of beetle of the family Chrysomelidae. It is found in Cambodia, China (Guangxi, Yunnan), Indonesia (Sumatra), Laos, Nepal, Thailand and Vietnam.

== Life history ==
The recorded host plants for this species are Ceiba pentandra and Helicteres species.
