= Idiophantis chiridota =

Scientific classification
- Domain: Eukaryota
- Kingdom: Animalia
- Phylum: Arthropoda
- Class: Insecta
- Order: Lepidoptera
- Family: Gelechiidae
- Genus: Idiophantis
- Species: I. chiridota

Binomial name
- Idiophantis chiridota Meyrick, 1914

Species of moth

Idiophantis chiridota is a moth of the family Gelechiidae. It was described by Edward Meyrick in 1914. It is found in Sri Lanka, Thailand, on the Sunda Islands and Fiji.

The wingspan is 14–16 mm. The forewings are light greyish ochreous, the veins sometimes slightly tinged with fuscous and with a rather broad pale bronzy-fuscous streak along the costa from near the base to the middle, confluent beneath with an elongate suffused dark fuscous blotch in the disc from the base to one-fourth, and a subquadrate dark fuscous blotch centrally paler in the disc before the middle. There is a dark fuscous dot on the lower margin of the cell in the middle of the wing, and two others at the angles of the cell, as well as an indistinct paler obtusely angulated subterminal line, becoming grey whitish on the costa, adjoining the terminal excavation in the middle. A pale ochreous-yellowish line is found from the costa beyond this, running into the apical prominence and there is a coppery-metallic spot edged with green beneath, occupying the upper part of the tornal prominence, with a pale ochreous-yellowish streak beneath it. The hindwings are light bronzy grey.
