= Postelectrotermes militaris =

Scientific classification
- Kingdom: Animalia
- Phylum: Arthropoda
- Class: Insecta
- Order: Blattodea
- Infraorder: Isoptera
- Family: Kalotermitidae
- Genus: Postelectrotermes
- Species: P. militaris

Binomial name
- Postelectrotermes militaris (Desneux, 1904)

Synonyms
- Calotermes militaris Desneux, 1904; Calotermes militaris unidentatus Kemner, 1926

Species of termite

Postelectrotermes militaris, the up-country tea termite, is a species of drywood termite of the genus Postelectrotermes. It is native to India and Sri Lanka. It is a serious pest of tea.

== Importance ==
It is one of major plant pest that attack wide range of economically important plants such as Acacia decurrens, Camellia sinensis, Casuarina equisetifolia, Cedrus sp., Cinnamomum camphora, Cryptomeria japonica, Erythrina subumbrans, Eucalyptus robusta, Grevillea robusta, Stenocarpus salignus, and Tephrosia vogelii. It mainly affects roots and stem parts, and sometimes the whole plant.

== Biology ==
Alates are rare in P. militaris colony. They invade bushes and mainly found in heartwood, never consume on sapwood.

== Control ==
Termites can be removed by crop sanitation and pruning methods. Cultivating disease-resistant crop varieties is also practiced on tea plantations. Besides that, usage of natural pests and pathogens is not effective. Some soil-borne entomopathogens, for example entomopathogenic nematodes such as Heterorhabditis sp., Steinernema carpocapsae and Steinernema feltiae can be effective in natural areas up to some extent.
