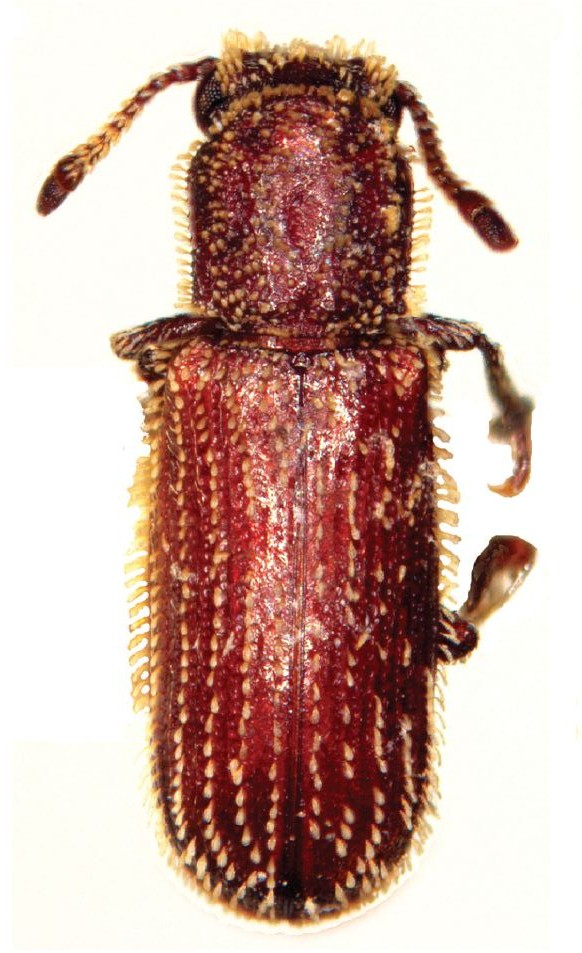

Scientific classification
- Kingdom: Animalia
- Phylum: Arthropoda
- Class: Insecta
- Order: Coleoptera
- Suborder: Polyphaga
- Family: Bostrichidae
- Tribe: Lyctini
- Genus: Minthea
- Species: M. rugicollis

Binomial name
- Minthea rugicollis (Walker, 1858)

Synonyms
- Eulachus hispidus Blackburn, 1885

= Minthea rugicollis =

Species of beetle

Minthea rugicollis, the hairy powderpost beetle, is a species of powder-post beetle in the family Bostrichidae. It is found in the Caribbean, Oceania, Southern Asia, and Europe.

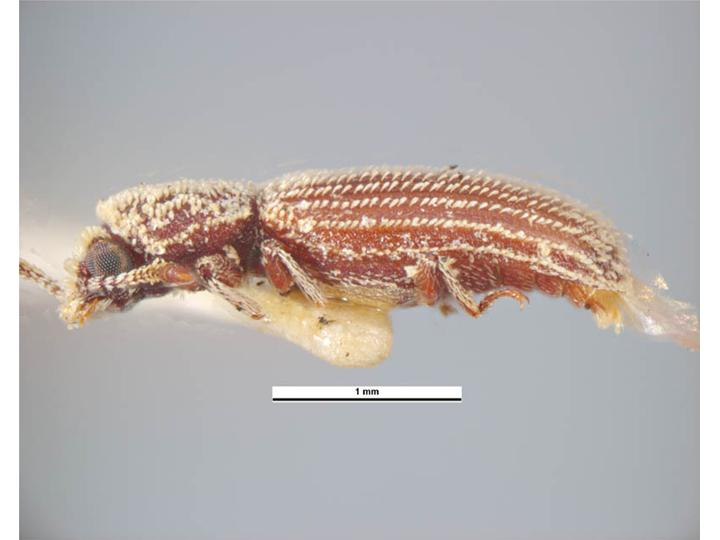
Hairy powderpost beetle, Minthea rugicollis
