= Pteroma pendula =

Scientific classification
- Kingdom: Animalia
- Phylum: Arthropoda
- Clade: Pancrustacea
- Class: Insecta
- Order: Lepidoptera
- Family: Psychidae
- Genus: Pteroma
- Species: P. pendula

Binomial name
- Pteroma pendula (de Joannis, 1929)

Species of moth

Pteroma pendula, the oil palm bagworm or simply bagworm, is a species of bagworm moth found in East and Southeast Asia that infests oil palm plantations.

Pteroma pendula is among most economically damaging pest of oil palm plantations in Malaysia and Indonesia, along with Metisa plana. The caterpillars also feed on other trees and shrubs, including Acacia mangium, Delonix regia, Cassia fistula, and Callerya atropurpurea. 31 different species have been identified as host plants for P. pendula. Insecticides are the favoured method of controlling the moth in most commercial plantations. Natural enemies such as predators, parasitoids, and fungi kill up to 4.85% of the population.

== Life cycle ==
Survival rate of P. pendula eggs differs based on chosen host plant. The species has six larval instars. Pupae are typically found in middle and lower fronds, while caterpillars go higher in search fresh ones. Dimorphism has been reported in the pupal and imago stages. Males generally live longer than females.

== Damage symptoms ==
P. pendula infestations can be detected by a number of symptoms. Holes in leaves and sometimes defoliation are some signs, and discolouration may also result.
