= Tonica terasella =

Scientific classification
- Kingdom: Animalia
- Phylum: Arthropoda
- Class: Insecta
- Order: Lepidoptera
- Family: Depressariidae
- Genus: Tonica
- Species: T. terasella

Binomial name
- Tonica terasella Walker, 1864

Synonyms
- Tonica teratella Meyrick, 1922

Species of moth

Tonica terasella is a moth in the family Depressariidae. It was described by Francis Walker in 1864. It is found on Borneo.

Adults are testaceous cinereous, the forewings thinly and minutely speckled with brown. There are two minute brown streaks near the base and a few minute tufts of oblique scales.
