= Colposcenia elegans =

Scientific classification
- Domain: Eukaryota
- Kingdom: Animalia
- Phylum: Arthropoda
- Class: Insecta
- Order: Hemiptera
- Suborder: Sternorrhyncha
- Family: Aphalaridae
- Genus: Colposcenia
- Species: C. elegans

Binomial name
- Colposcenia elegans (De Bergevin, 1932)

Synonyms
- Aphalara elegans De Bergevin, 1932; Colposcenia arishensis (Samy, 1972)

Species of true bug

Colposcenia elegans is a species of bug in the subfamily Aphalarinae. It has a palaearctic distribution in North and East Africa and the Middle East.
