= Cardiaspina densitexta =

Scientific classification
- Kingdom: Animalia
- Phylum: Arthropoda
- Class: Insecta
- Order: Hemiptera
- Suborder: Sternorrhyncha
- Family: Aphalaridae
- Genus: Cardiaspina
- Species: C. densitexta

Binomial name
- Cardiaspina densitexta Taylor, 1962

Species of true bug

Cardiaspina densitexta is a bug species in the genus Cardiaspina, found in Australia. It is found on Eucalyptus species such as Eucalyptus fasciculosa, Eucalyptus diversifolia and Eucalyptus odorata. This species protects itself in lerp.
