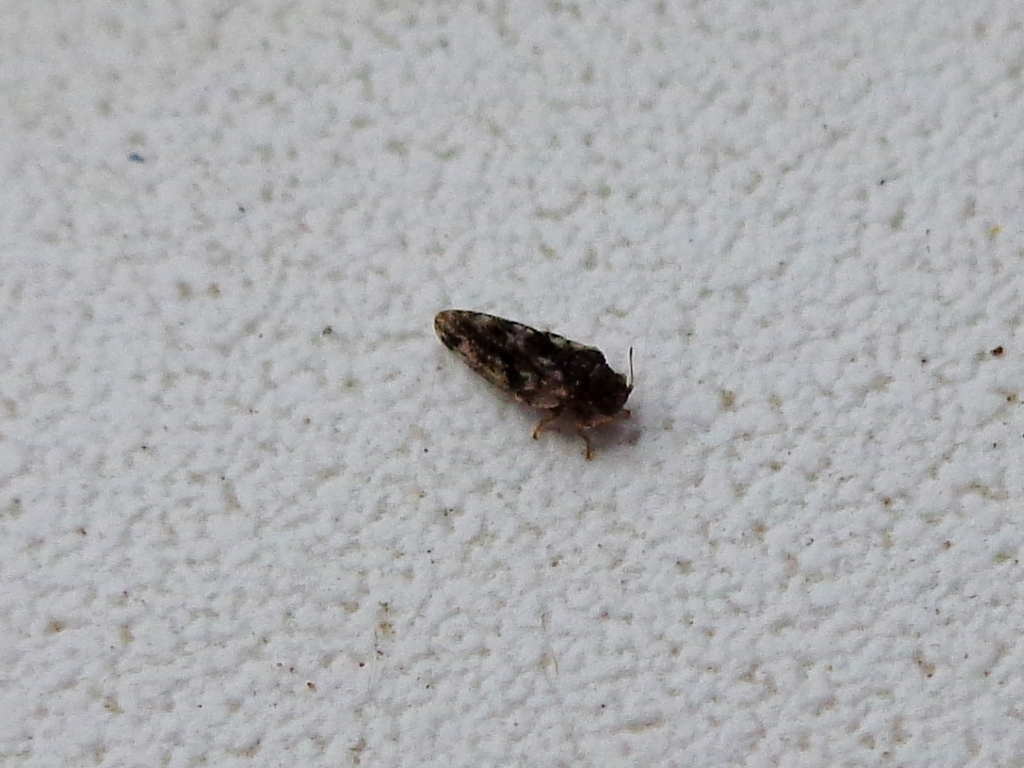
- Aphalara ulicis

Scientific classification
- Domain: Eukaryota
- Kingdom: Animalia
- Phylum: Arthropoda
- Class: Insecta
- Order: Hemiptera
- Suborder: Sternorrhyncha
- Family: Aphalaridae
- Subfamily: Aphalarinae; Löw, 1879

Tribes
- Aphalarini; Caillardiini; Colposceniini; Gyropsyllini; Xenaphalarini

= Aphalarinae =

Subfamily of true bugs

Aphalarinae is a bug subfamily in the family Aphalaridae.

== Overview of genera ==
tribe Aphalarini

- Aphalara
- Brachystetha
- Craspedolepta
- Epheloscyta
- Hodkinsonia
- Neaphalara

=== Caillardiini ===
- Caillardia
- Eumetoecus
- Rhodochlanis
- Rhombaphalara

=== Colposceniini ===
- Colposcenia
- Crastina
- Lanthanaphalara
- †Necropsylla

=== Gyropsyllini ===
- Gyropsylla
- Limataphalara
- †Eogyropsylla

=== Xenaphalarini ===
- Eurotica
- Xenaphalara
- †Proeurotica

†Paleopsylloidini

- †Paleopsylloides
