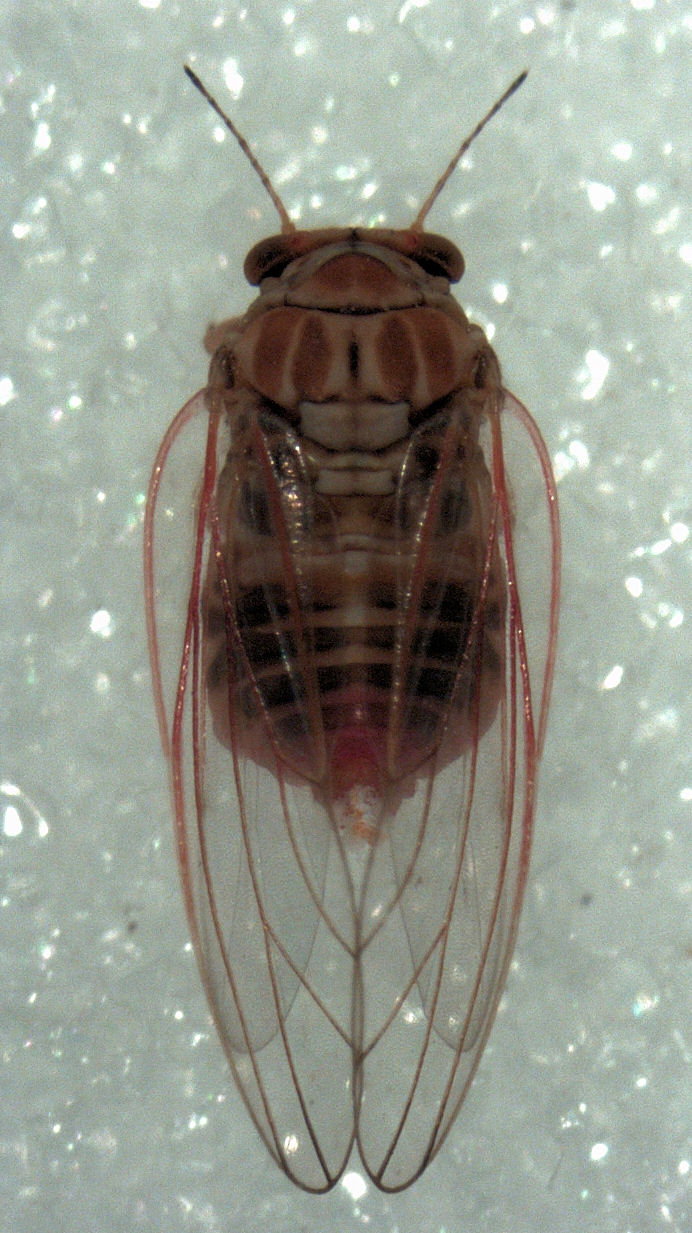
- Adult Cardiaspina fiscella

Scientific classification
- Domain: Eukaryota
- Kingdom: Animalia
- Phylum: Arthropoda
- Class: Insecta
- Order: Hemiptera
- Suborder: Sternorrhyncha
- Family: Aphalaridae
- Subfamily: Spondyliaspidinae; Schwarz, 1898

Genera
- See text

Synonyms
- Ctenarytainini; Livillinae

= Spondyliaspidinae =

Subfamily of true bugs

Spondyliaspidinae is a bug subfamily in the family Aphalaridae. Plant eaters, they primarily feed on eucalypts.

== Genera ==
- Agelaeopsylla
- Anoeconeossa
- Australopsylla
- Blastopsylla
- Blepharocosta
- Boreioglycaspis
- Cardiaspina
- Creiis
- Cryptoneossa
- Ctenarytaina
- Dasypsylla
- Eriopsylla
- Eucalyptolyma
- Eurhinocola
- Glycaspis
- Hyalinaspis
- Kenmooreana
- Lasiopsylla
- Leptospermonastes
- Phellopsylla
- Phyllolyma
- Platyobria
- Spondyliaspis
- Syncarpiolyma
