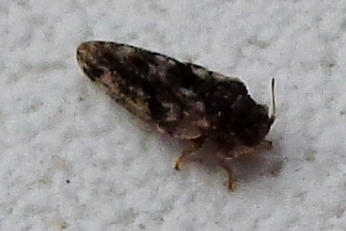
- Aphalara ulicis

Scientific classification
- Domain: Eukaryota
- Kingdom: Animalia
- Phylum: Arthropoda
- Class: Insecta
- Order: Hemiptera
- Suborder: Sternorrhyncha
- Family: Aphalaridae
- Subfamily: Aphalarinae
- Tribe: Aphalarini; Löw, 1879

Genera
- Aphalara; Brachystetha; Craspedolepta; Epheloscyta; Hodkinsonia; Neaphalara

= Aphalarini =

Tribe of true bugs

Aphalarini is a tribe of jumping plant lice (psyllid) in the subfamily Aphalarinae, first described by Franz Löw in 1879.

I.D. Hodkinson (1989) includes the genera, Aphalara and Craspedolepta in the tribe, whereas D.L. Crawford (1914) includes Aphalara and Rhinocola.
