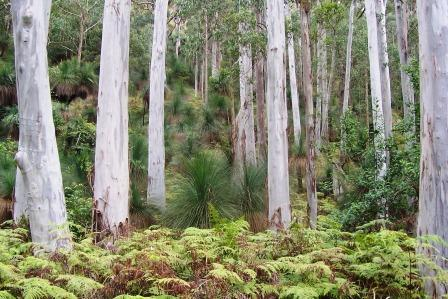
- Blue gum forest at Mount Cabrebald

Conservation status
- Least Concern (IUCN 3.1)

Scientific classification
- Kingdom: Plantae
- Clade: Embryophytes
- Clade: Tracheophytes
- Clade: Spermatophytes
- Clade: Angiosperms
- Clade: Eudicots
- Clade: Rosids
- Order: Myrtales
- Family: Myrtaceae
- Genus: Eucalyptus
- Species: E. saligna

Binomial name
- Eucalyptus saligna Sm.

Synonyms
- Eucalyptus saligna Sm. subsp. saligna; Eucalyptus saligna var. protrusa Blakely & McKie; Eucalyptus saligna Sm. var. saligna

= Eucalyptus saligna =

Sydney blue gum

Species of eucalyptus

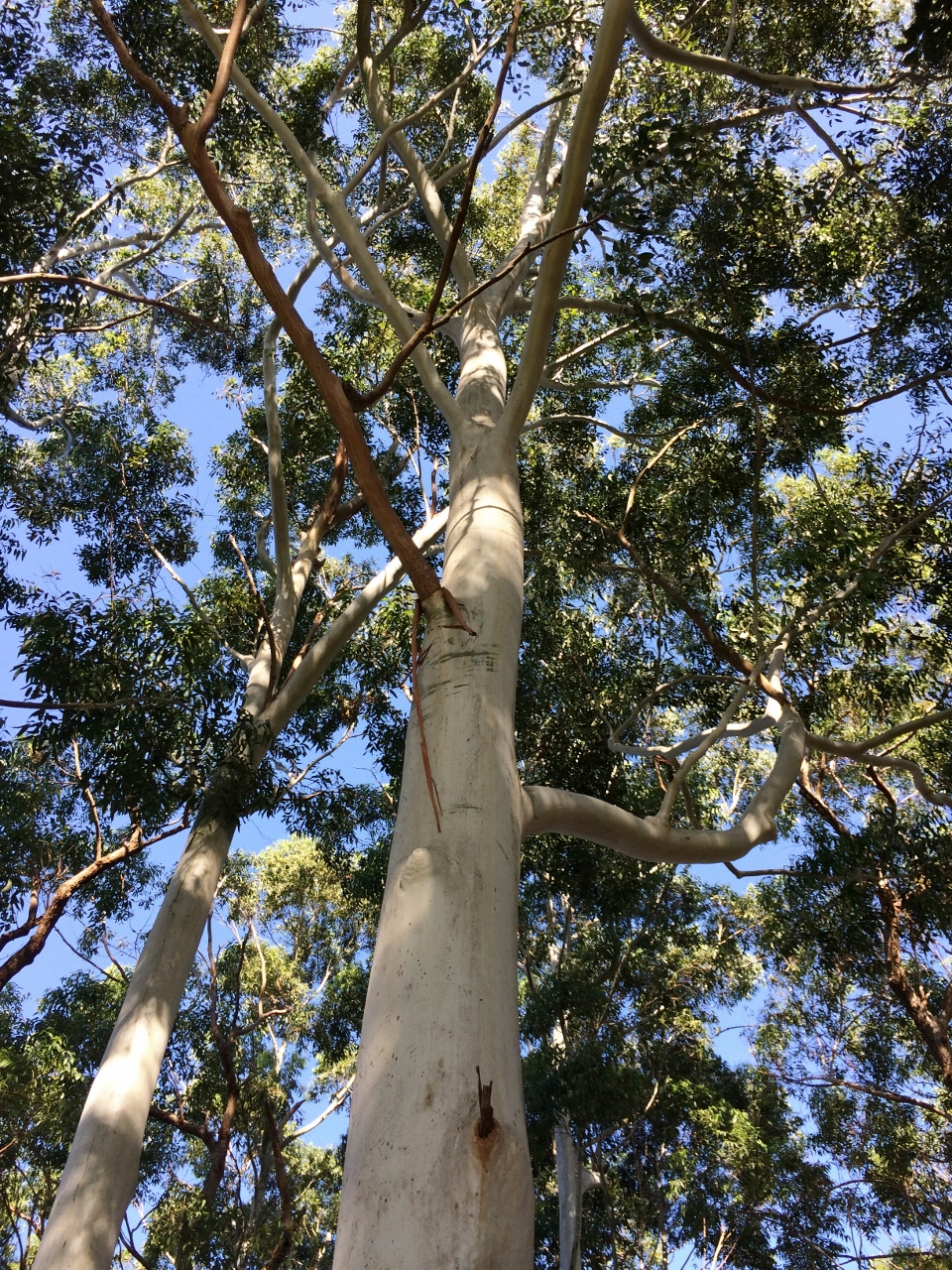
Sydney blue gum (Eucalyptus saligna), Lilli Pilli NSW Australia

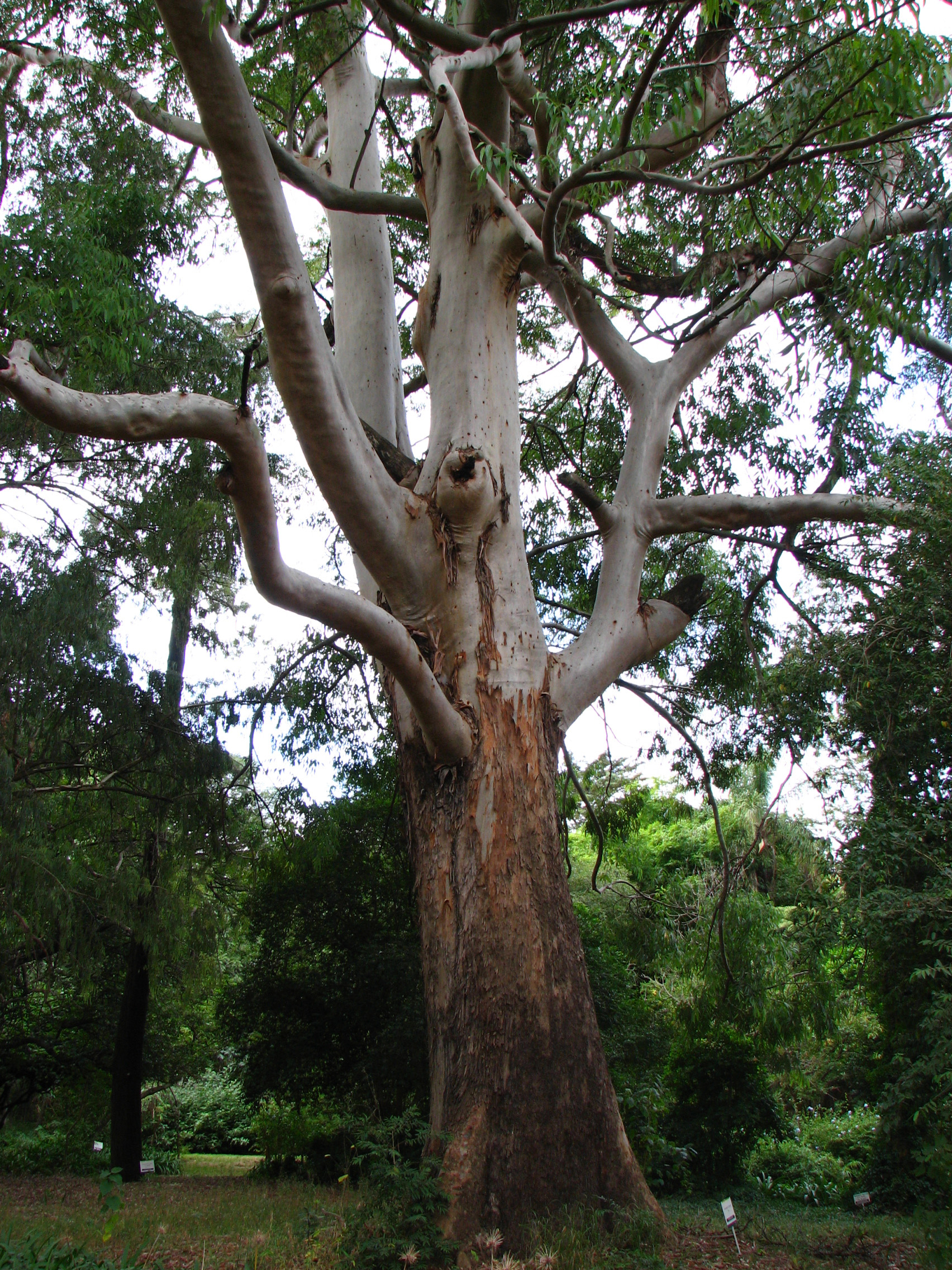
Eucalyptus saligna with rough lower trunk bark

Eucalyptus saligna, commonly known as the Sydney blue gum or blue gum, is a species of medium-sized to tall tree that is endemic to eastern Australia. It has rough, flaky bark near the base of the trunk, smooth bark above, lance-shaped to curved adult leaves, flower buds in groups of seven, nine or eleven, white flowers and cylindrical to conical or cup-shaped fruit.

== Description ==
Eucalyptus saligna is a tree with a straight trunk that typically grows to a height of 30–55 m (98–180 ft), rarely to 65 m (213 ft), a dbh of 2–2.5 m (6 ft 7 in – 8 ft 2 in), and forms a lignotuber. The trunk has smooth pale grey or white bark with 1–4 m (3 ft 3 in – 13 ft 1 in) of rough brownish bark at the base. Young plants and coppice regrowth have lance-shaped to egg-shaped or oblong leaves that are paler on the lower surface, 37–120 mm (1.5–4.7 in) long and 15–40 mm (0.59–1.57 in) wide. Adult leaves are arranged alternately, glossy green, paler on the lower surface, lance-shaped to curved, 90–190 mm (3.5–7.5 in) long and 15–40 mm (0.59–1.57 in) wide, on a petiole 15–30 mm (0.59–1.18 in) long. The flower buds are arranged in leaf axils in groups of seven, nine or eleven on an unbranched peduncle 5–15 mm (0.20–0.59 in) long, the individual buds sessile or on pedicels up to 5 mm (0.20 in) long. Mature buds are spindle-shaped, oval or diamond-shaped, 5–10 mm (0.20–0.39 in) long and 3–5 mm (0.12–0.20 in) wide with a conical or beaked operculum. Flowering occurs from December to March and the flowers are white. The fruit is a woody cylindrical, conical or cup-shaped capsule 4–9 mm (0.16–0.35 in) long and 4–7 mm (0.16–0.28 in) wide with the valves protruding above the rim.

== Taxonomy and naming ==
Eucalyptus saligna was first formally described in 1797 by English naturalist James Edward Smith in Transactions of the Linnean Society of London, and still bears its original name. The species name saligna refers to some likeness to a willow, though what attribute this is, is unclear. It has been classified in the subgenus Symphyomyrtus, Section Latoangulatae, Series Transversae (eastern blue gums) by Ian Brooker and David Kleinig. Its two closest relatives are the flooded gum (E. grandis) and the mountain blue gum (E. deanei).

== Distribution and habitat ==
Sydney blue gum is generally found within 120 km (75 mi) of the coastline in its range from Sydney to Maryborough in central Queensland. To the northwest, it is found in disjunct populations in central Queensland, including in Eungella National Park, Kroombit Tops, Consuelo Tableland, Blackdown Tableland and Carnarvon Gorge. It grows in tall forests in more sheltered areas, on clay or loam soils, and alluvial sands. It is a component of the endangered blue gum high forest ecological community in the Sydney region. Populations found south of Sydney are now not considered to be E. saligna.

Associated trees include blackbutt (E. pilularis), grey ironbark (E. paniculata), mountain blue gum (E. deanei), flooded gum (E. grandis), tallowwood (E. microcorys), thin-leaved stringybark (E. eugenioides), manna gum (E. viminalis), river peppermint (E. elata), grey gums (E. punctata and E. propinqua ), rough-barked apple (Angophora floribunda), spotted gum (Corymbia maculata), turpentine (Syncarpia glomulifera), brush box (Lophostemon confertus) and forest oak (Allocasuarina torulosa).

South of Sydney Harbour and the Parramatta River, pure stands of E. saligna give way to hybrid populations with bangalay (E. botryoides).

== Ecology ==
Eucalyptus saligna regenerates by regrowing from epicormic buds on the trunk and lower branches after bushfire. Trees live for over two hundred years. The grey-headed flying fox (Pteropus poliocephalus) eats the flowers, the koala (Phascalarctos cinereus) eats the leaves, and crimson rosella (Platycercus elegans) eats the seed. The longhorn beetle species Paroplites australis, Agrianome spinicollis and Tessaromma undatum have been recorded from the Sydney blue gum.

The presence of the territorial and aggressive bell miner (Manorina melanophrys) and psyllid insects (Glycaspis) is correlated with dieback of the canopy of E. saligna, a syndrome which has been termed bell-miner-associated dieback (BMAD), though the exact mechanism remains unclear. After colonization by Glycaspis, E. salinga may then be infested by the ambrosia beetle Amasa truncata.

== Uses ==
The wood of this species is heavy (about 850 kg/m^{3} (1,430 lb/cu yd)), fairly hard, coarse, even textured and reasonably easy to work. It is used for general building construction, panelling, and boatbuilding, and is highly prized for flooring and furniture because of its rich dark honey colour.

Features of the Sydney blue gum (Eucalyptus saligna)

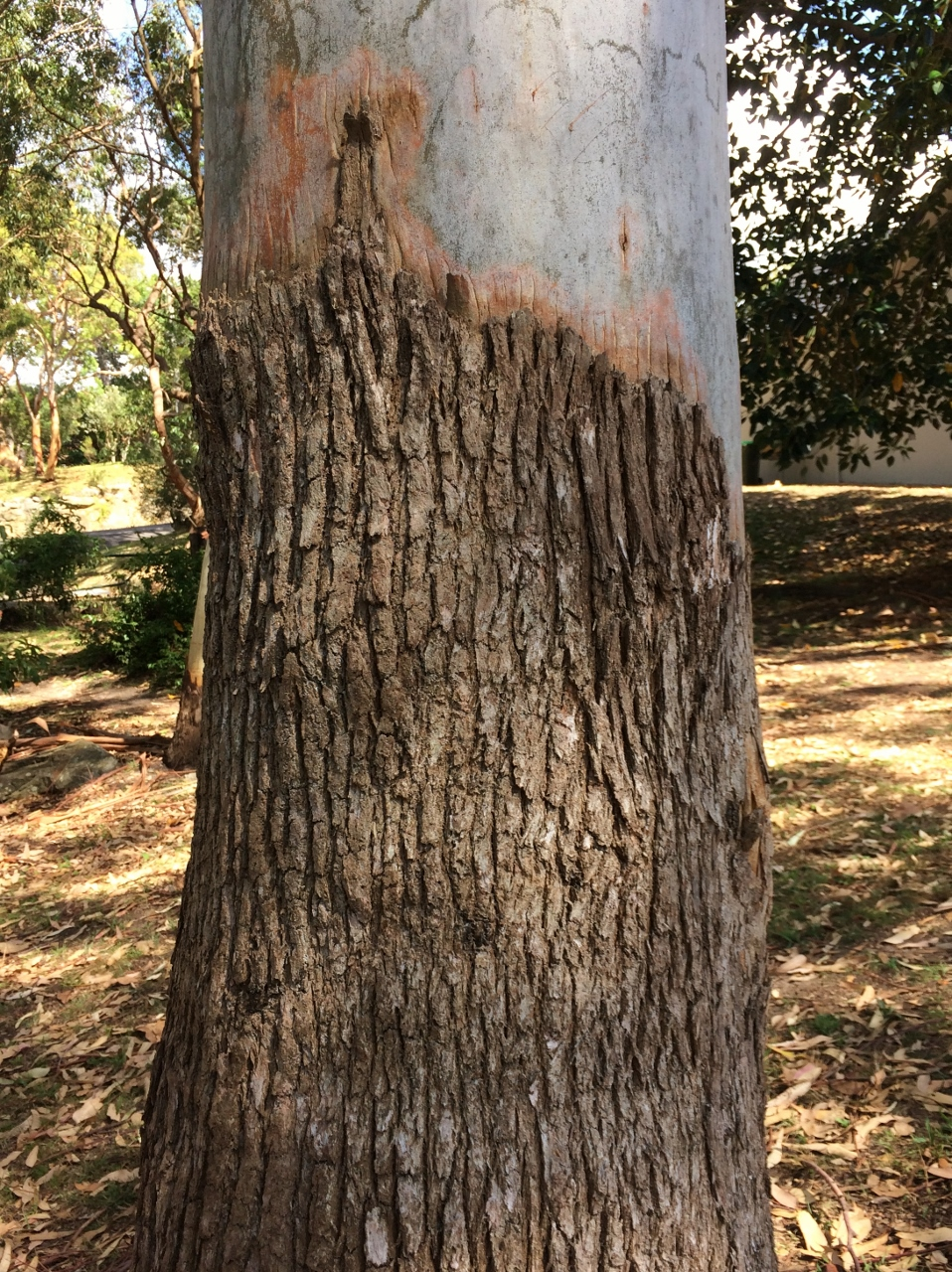
Stocking bark

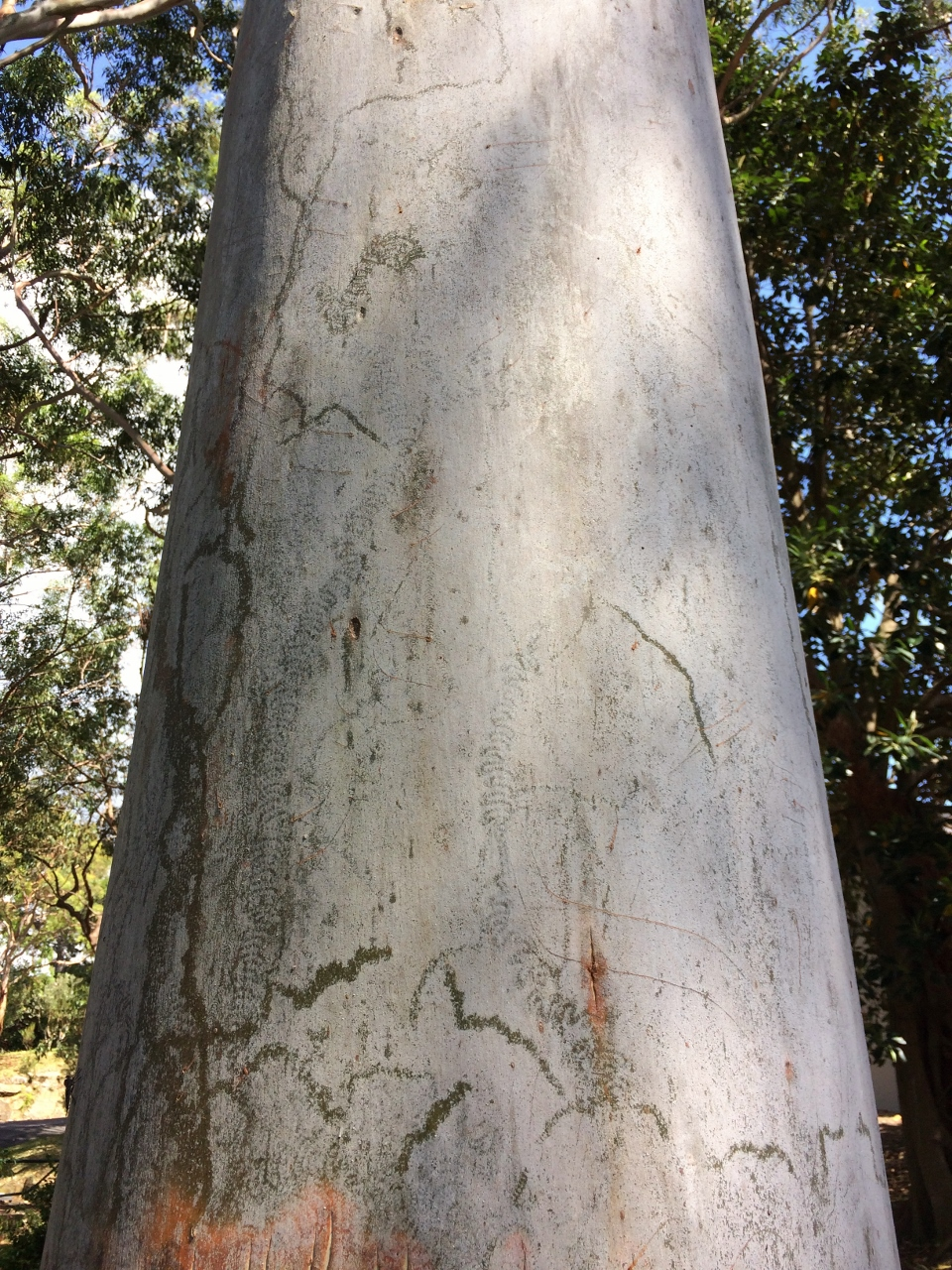
Trunk bark

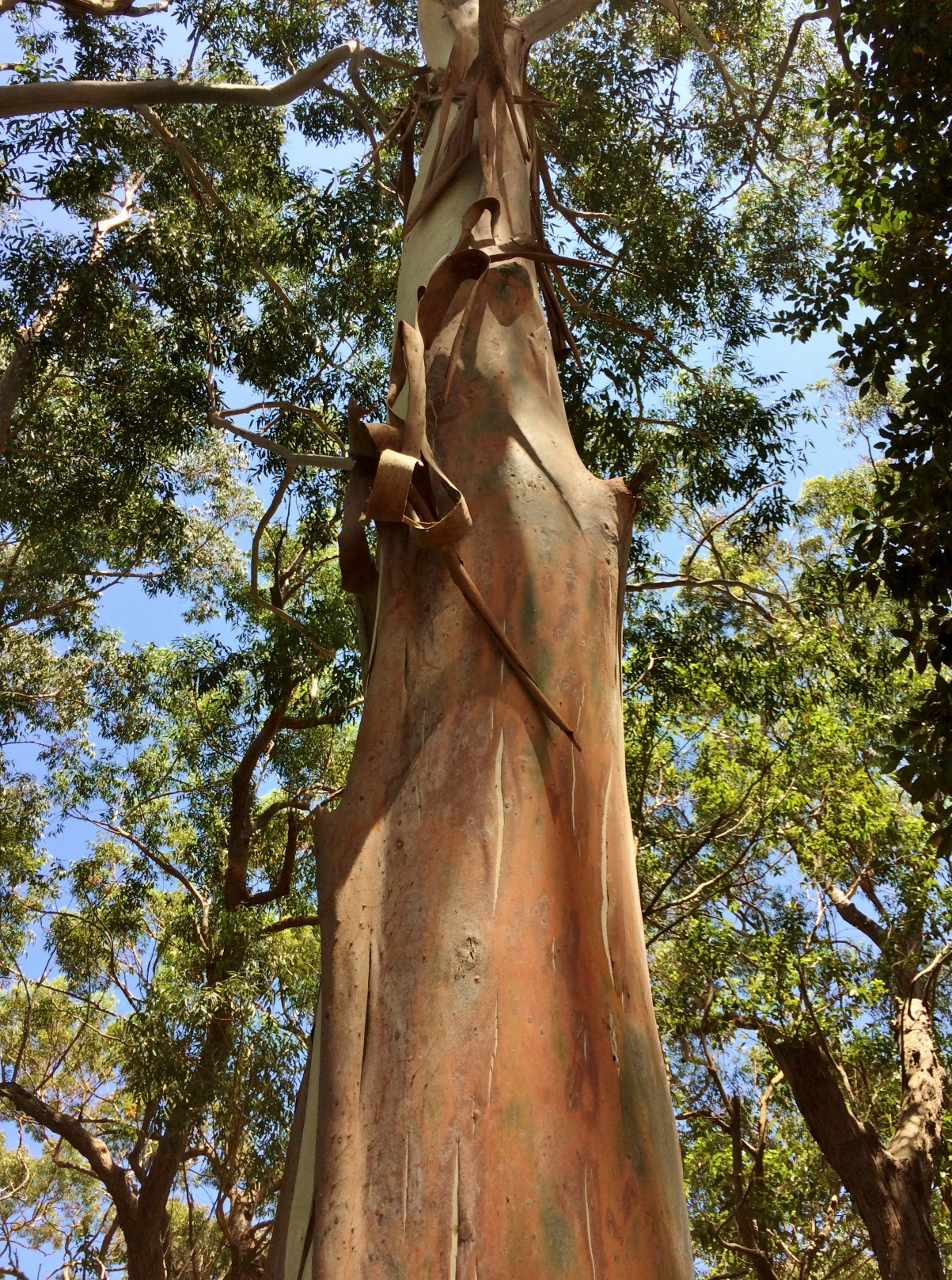
Shedding bark

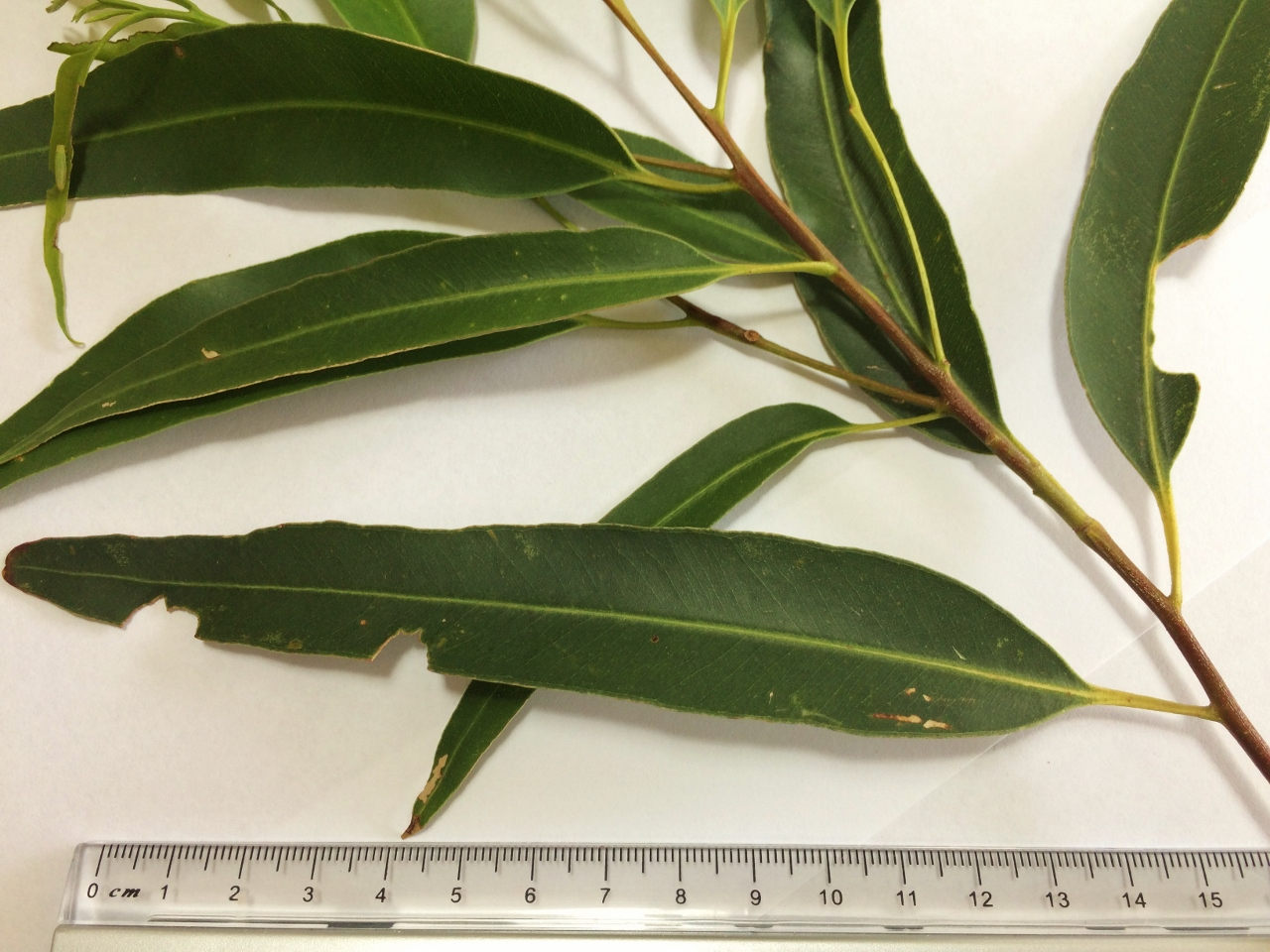
Leaves

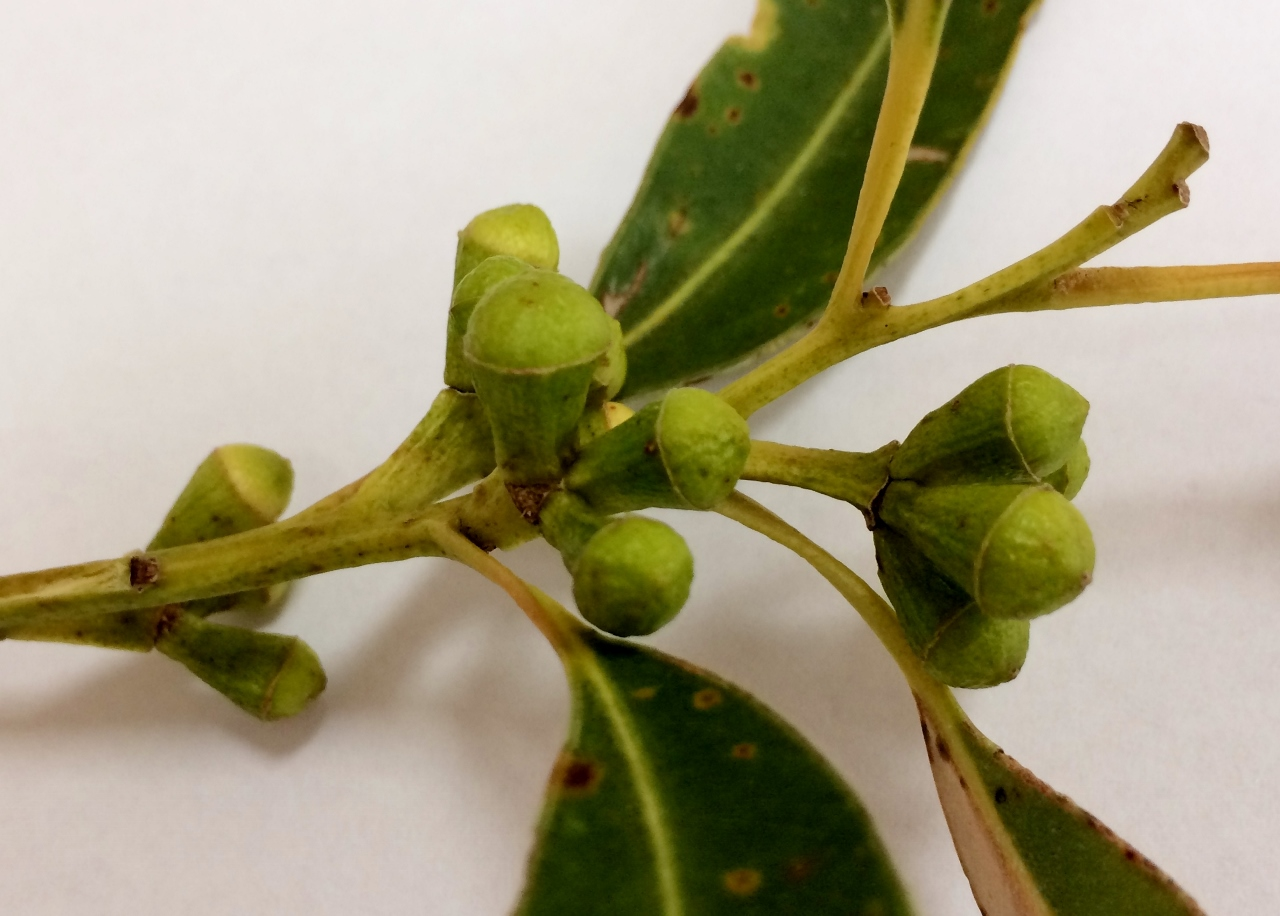
Buds

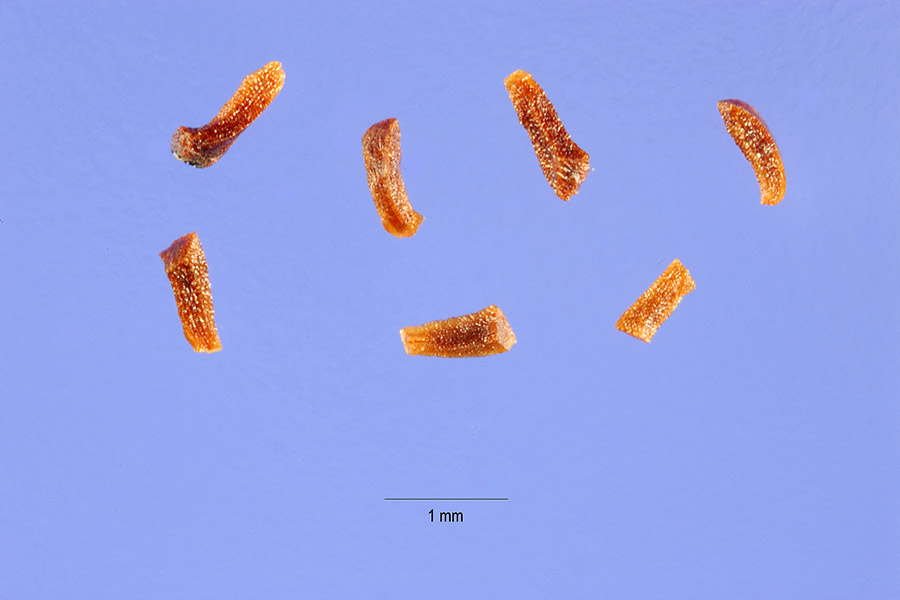
Seeds
