= Assara albicostalis =

Scientific classification
- Kingdom: Animalia
- Phylum: Arthropoda
- Class: Insecta
- Order: Lepidoptera
- Family: Pyralidae
- Genus: Assara
- Species: A. albicostalis

Binomial name
- Assara albicostalis Walker, 1863

Synonyms
- Euzophera niveicostella Hampson, 1896; Hyphantidium subterebrellum Snellen, 1880

Species of moth

Assara albicostalis is a moth of the family Pyralidae. It has a wide distribution and has been recorded from India, Sri Lanka, Thailand, Sabah, the Philippines, Taiwan, Sulawesi, Australia, Fiji, Tahiti, Samoa, Hawaii and the Marquesas. This is the type species of genus Assara.

The forewings of this species are ferruginous, with a white costal stripe, a few minute blackish marks at the hind border and a cinereous, denticulated submarginal line. Wingspan approximately 9 lines / 19mm.

The wingspan is 12–20 mm. There are about three overlapping generations per year and a partial fourth. The larvae bore the pods of various stored products, including Garuga pinnata.
