= Cardiaspina retator =

Scientific classification
- Kingdom: Animalia
- Phylum: Arthropoda
- Class: Insecta
- Order: Hemiptera
- Suborder: Sternorrhyncha
- Family: Aphalaridae
- Genus: Cardiaspina
- Species: C. retator

Binomial name
- Cardiaspina retator Taylor, 1962

Species of true bug

Cardiaspina retator is a bug species in the genus Cardiaspina, found on Eucalyptus species in Australia.
