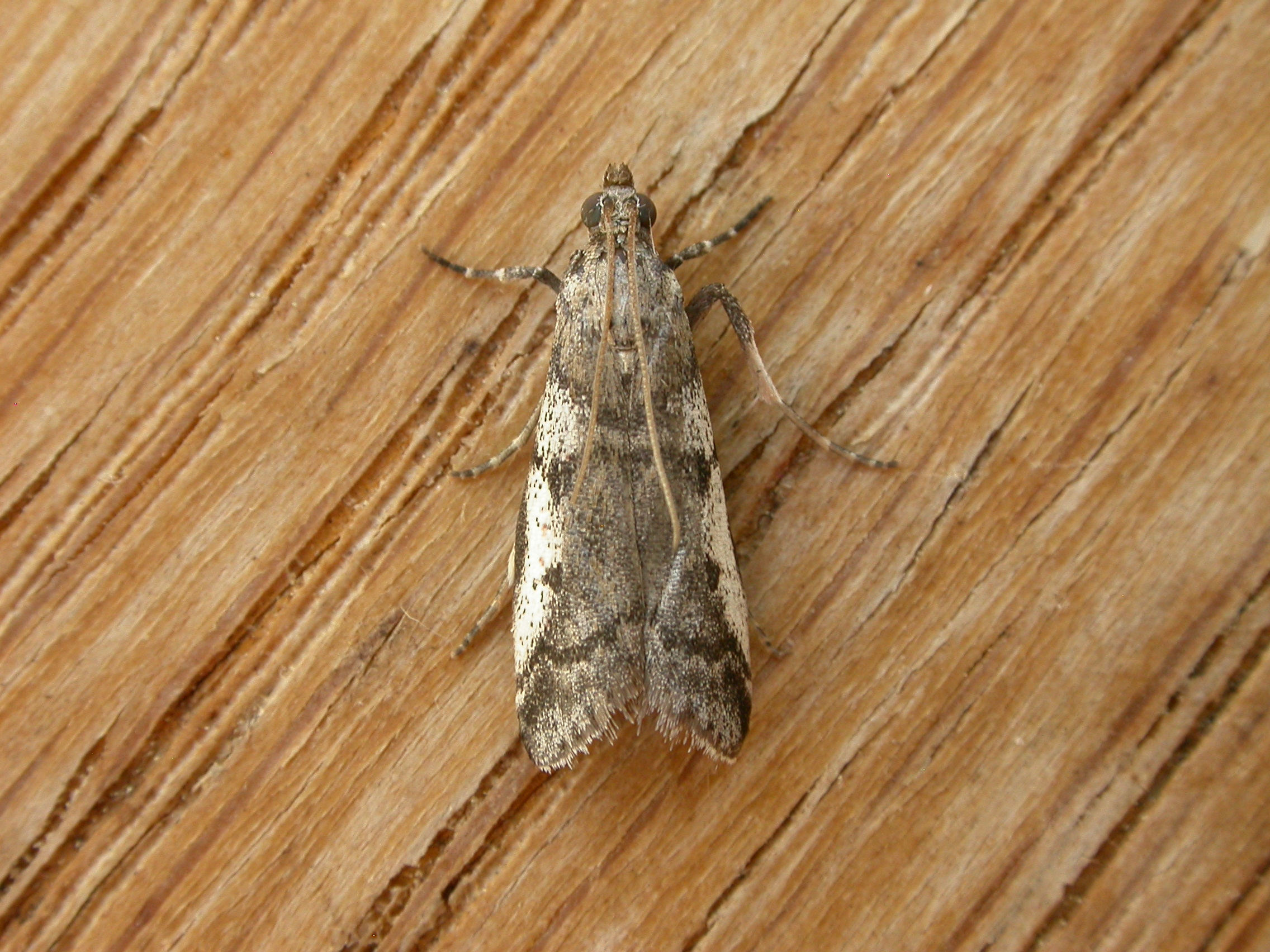
- Assara holophragma imago

Scientific classification
- Kingdom: Animalia
- Phylum: Arthropoda
- Clade: Pancrustacea
- Class: Insecta
- Order: Lepidoptera
- Family: Pyralidae
- Tribe: Phycitini
- Genus: Assara; Walker, 1863

Type species
- Assara albicostalis Walker, 1863

Synonyms
- Cateremna Meyrick, 1882

= Assara =

Genus of moths

Assara is a genus of small moths belonging to the snout moth family (Pyralidae). They are part of the tribe Phycitini within the huge snout moth subfamily Phycitinae.

== Selected species ==
Species of Assara include:

- Assara albicostalis
- Assara aterpes
- Assara balanophorae
- Assara cataxutha
- Assara chionopleura
- Assara conicolella
- Assara decipula Clarke, 1986
- Assara exiguella
- Assara formosana
- Assara funerella
- Assara halmophila (Meyrick, 1929)
- Assara holophragma
- Assara hoeneella
- Assara holophragma
- Assara incredibilis
- Assara inouei
- Assara ketjila Roesler & Küppers, 1981
- Assara korbi (Caradja, 1910) (from China)
- Assara leucarma
- Assara linjiangensis
- Assara melanomita
- Assara microdoxa
- Assara murasei
- Assara odontosema
- Assara pallidella
- Assara pinivora
- Assara proleuca
- Assara quadriguttella
- Assara semifictile
- Assara seminivale (from Australia)
- Assara subarcuella
- Assara terebrella (Zincken, 1818) (from China)
- Assara tuberculosa
- Assara tumidula
- Assara turciella
