= Assara chionopleura =

Scientific classification
- Domain: Eukaryota
- Kingdom: Animalia
- Phylum: Arthropoda
- Class: Insecta
- Order: Lepidoptera
- Family: Pyralidae
- Genus: Assara
- Species: A. chionopleura

Binomial name
- Assara chionopleura (Turner, 1947)

Synonyms
- Tylochares melanomita Turner, 1947

Species of moth

Assara chionopleura is a species of snout moth in the genus Assara. It is found in Australia.
