= Assara odontosema =

Scientific classification
- Domain: Eukaryota
- Kingdom: Animalia
- Phylum: Arthropoda
- Class: Insecta
- Order: Lepidoptera
- Family: Pyralidae
- Genus: Assara
- Species: A. odontosema

Binomial name
- Assara odontosema (Turner, 1913)

Synonyms
- Trissonca odontosema Turner, 1913

Species of moth

Assara odontosema is a species of snout moth in the genus Assara. It was described by Alfred Jefferis Turner in 1913 and is found in Australia.
