= Colposcenia =

Scientific classification
- Domain: Eukaryota
- Kingdom: Animalia
- Phylum: Arthropoda
- Class: Insecta
- Order: Hemiptera
- Suborder: Sternorrhyncha
- Family: Aphalaridae
- Subfamily: Aphalarinae
- Tribe: Colposceniini
- Genus: Colposcenia; Enderlein, 1929

Synonyms
- Stigmaphalara Enderlein, 1929

Genus of true bugs

Colposcenia is a genus of Palaearctic plant lice in the family Aphalaridae and tribe Colposceniini.

== Species ==
The Global Biodiversity Information Facility lists:

1. Colposcenia agnata Burckhardt & Lauterer, 1993
2. Colposcenia albomaculata Loginova, 1960
3. Colposcenia aliena (Löw, 1881)
4. Colposcenia arabica Loginova, 1974
5. Colposcenia australis Hollis, 1974
6. Colposcenia bidentata Burckhardt, 1988
7. Colposcenia cavillosa Burckhardt & Lauterer, 1993
8. Colposcenia conspurcata Loginova, 1960
9. Colposcenia constricta Mathur, 1975
10. Colposcenia dioscoridis Malenovský & Burckhardt, 2014
11. Colposcenia elegans (De Bergevin, 1932)
12. Colposcenia faceta Loginova, 1972
13. Colposcenia flaviantenna Li, 2011
14. Colposcenia flavipunctata Li, 2011
15. Colposcenia forficulata Li, 2011
16. Colposcenia galactospila Li, 2011
17. Colposcenia hongliuheana Li, 2011
18. Colposcenia ignota Loginova, 1960
19. Colposcenia jakowleffi (Scott, 1879)
20. Colposcenia kiritshenkoi Loginova, 1960
21. Colposcenia linzensis Li, 2011
22. Colposcenia loginovae Baeva, 1963
23. Colposcenia lurida (Scott, 1880)
24. Colposcenia lutea Li, 2011
25. Colposcenia namibiensis Hollis, 1974
26. Colposcenia orientalis (Klimaszewski, 1970)
27. Colposcenia osmanica Vondráček, 1953
28. Colposcenia paula Burckhardt & Lauterer, 1993
29. Colposcenia rubricata Loginova, 1972
30. Colposcenia tamaricis (Puton, 1871)
31. Colposcenia traciana (Klimaszewski, 1970)
32. Colposcenia turanica Loginova, 1974
33. Colposcenia vicina Loginova, 1960
34. Colposcenia viridis Loginova, 1972
35. Colposcenia zonatospila Li, 2011
