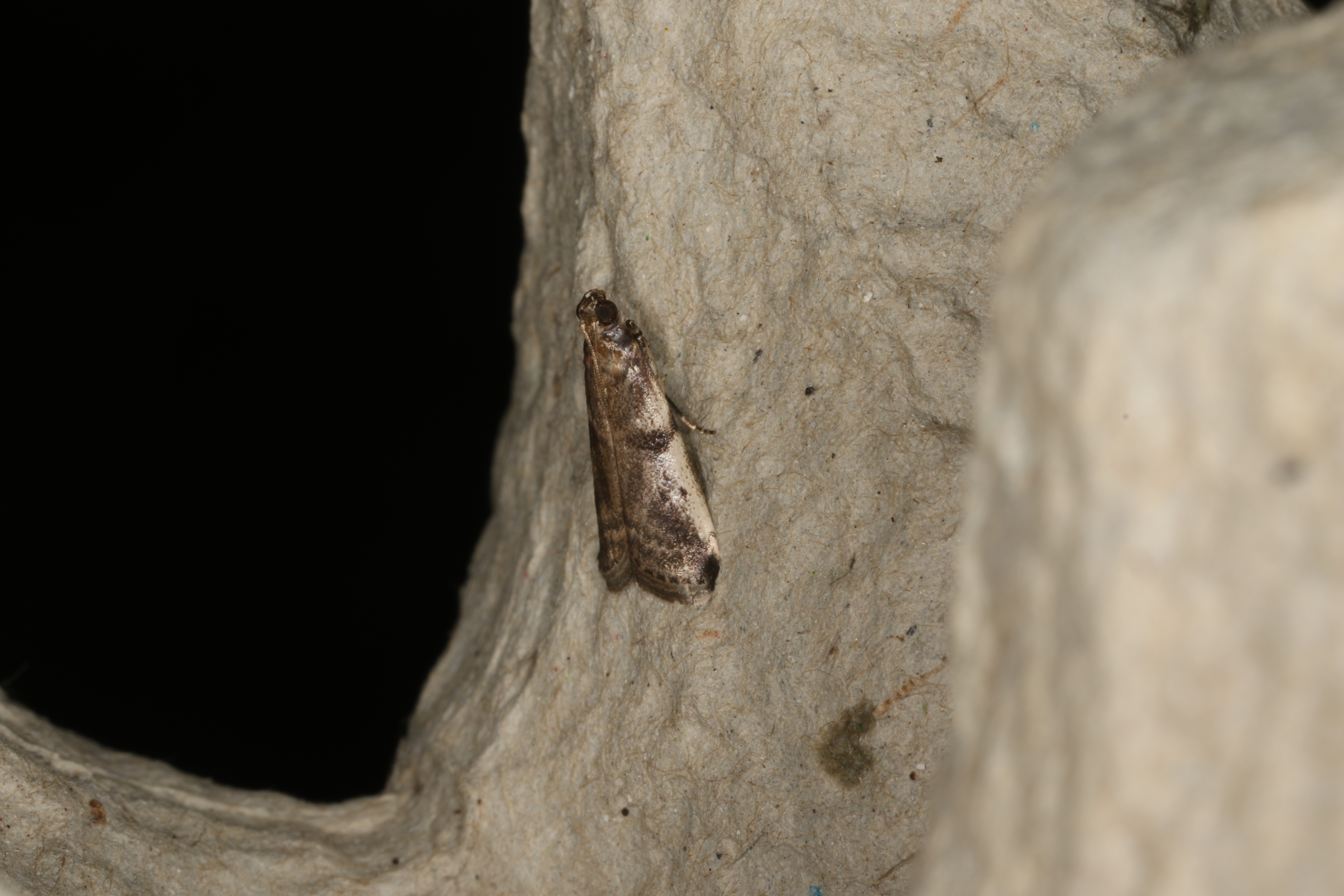

Scientific classification
- Domain: Eukaryota
- Kingdom: Animalia
- Phylum: Arthropoda
- Class: Insecta
- Order: Lepidoptera
- Family: Pyralidae
- Genus: Assara
- Species: A. seminivale

Binomial name
- Assara seminivale (Turner, 1904)

Synonyms
- Assara seminivalis Turner, 1904; Cateremna seminivale; Hypanthidium seminivale Meyrick, 1879

= Assara seminivale =

Species of moth

Assara seminivale, the kernel grub or macadamia kernel grub, is a species of snout moth in the genus Assara. It was described by Turner in 1904, and is known from Australia. There are also records for Sikkim, Tonkin, Sri Lanka, Sumatra and Borneo, but these need verification.

The larvae feed on the nuts of Macadamia species (including Macadamia integrifolia), the seeds of Mangifera indica and fruit of Heritiera littoralis.
