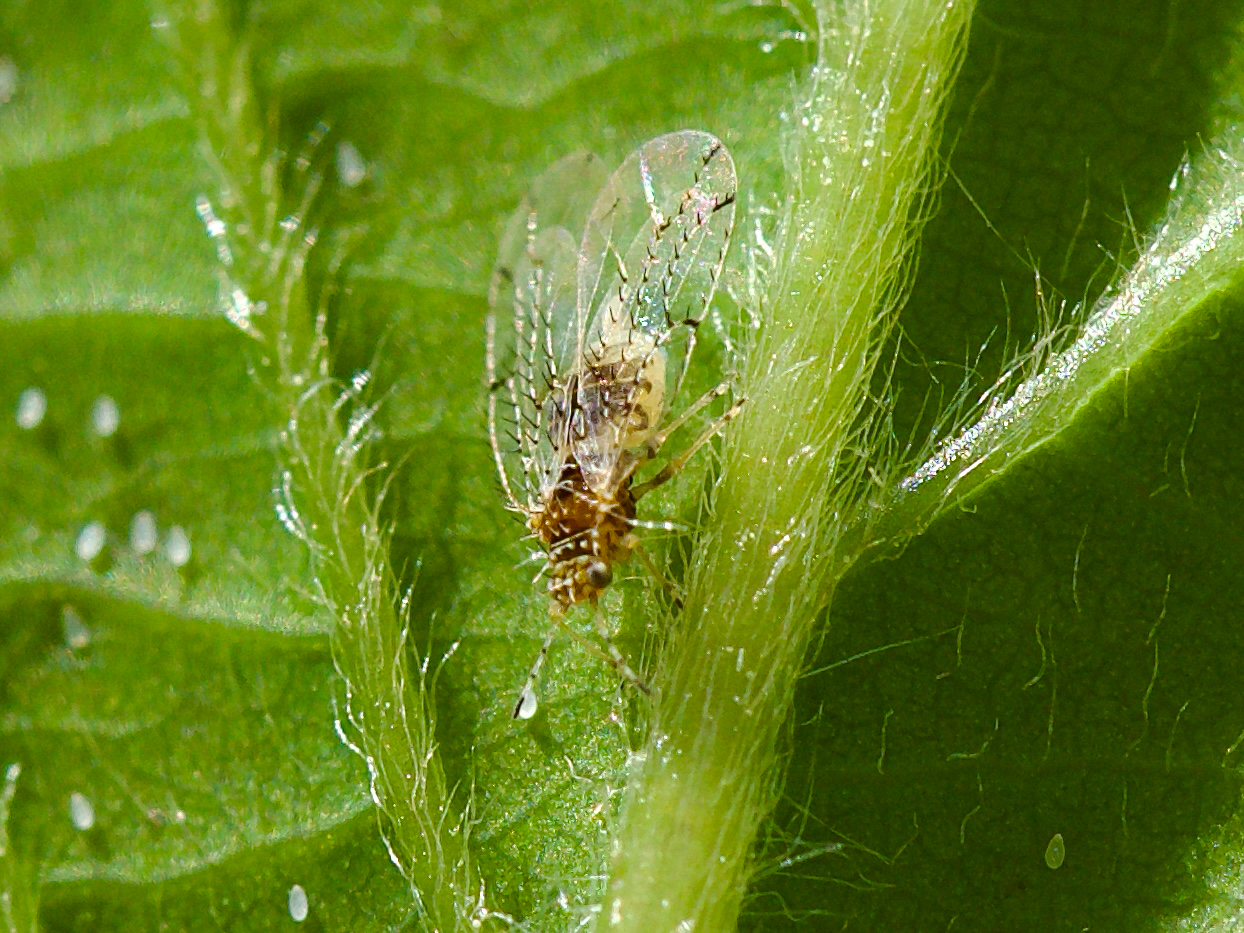
- Togepsylla matsumurana

Scientific classification
- Domain: Eukaryota
- Kingdom: Animalia
- Phylum: Arthropoda
- Class: Insecta
- Order: Hemiptera
- Suborder: Sternorrhyncha
- Family: Aphalaridae
- Subfamily: Togepsyllinae; Bekker-Migdosova, 1973

Genera
- Syncoptozus Enderlein, 1918; Togepsylla Kuwayama, 1931

Synonyms
- Hemipteripsyllinae Yang & Li, 1981

= Togepsyllinae =

Subfamily of true bugs

Togepsyllinae is a subfamily of bugs in the family Aphalaridae.
