= Assara tumidula =

Scientific classification
- Domain: Eukaryota
- Kingdom: Animalia
- Phylum: Arthropoda
- Class: Insecta
- Order: Lepidoptera
- Family: Pyralidae
- Genus: Assara
- Species: A. tumidula

Binomial name
- Assara tumidula Du, Li & Wang, 2002

Species of moth

Assara tumidula is a species of snout moth in the genus Assara. It was described by Yan-Li Du, Hou-Hun Li and Shu-Xia Wang in 2002 and is known from China.
