= Assara incredibilis =

Scientific classification
- Domain: Eukaryota
- Kingdom: Animalia
- Phylum: Arthropoda
- Class: Insecta
- Order: Lepidoptera
- Family: Pyralidae
- Genus: Assara
- Species: A. incredibilis

Binomial name
- Assara incredibilis Roesler, 1973

Species of moth

Assara incredibilis is a species of snout moth in the genus Assara. It was described by Roesler in 1973, and is known from China.
