= Agonoscena pistaciae =

Scientific classification
- Kingdom: Animalia
- Phylum: Arthropoda
- Class: Insecta
- Order: Hemiptera
- Suborder: Sternorrhyncha
- Family: Aphalaridae
- Genus: Agonoscena
- Species: A. pistaciae

Binomial name
- Agonoscena pistaciae Burkhardt & Lauterer, 1989

Species of insect

Agonoscena pistaciae is a species of insect in the family Aphalaridae, described by Burckhardt & Lauterer in 1989. Commonly known as the pistachio psyllid, Agonoscena pistaciae is a major pest for pistachio trees. It can be found throughout the growing season in both nymph and adult form.

The pistachio psyllid causes damage by sucking sap from leaves and is destructive in pistachio-producing regions like Iran, Turkey, and the Middle East.
