= Assara halmophila =

Scientific classification
- Kingdom: Animalia
- Phylum: Arthropoda
- Class: Insecta
- Order: Lepidoptera
- Family: Pyralidae
- Genus: Assara
- Species: A. halmophila

Binomial name
- Assara halmophila (Meyrick, 1929)

Synonyms
- Cateremna halmophila Meyrick, 1929

Species of moth

Assara halmophila is a species of snout moth in the genus Assara. It was described by Edward Meyrick in 1929. It is found on the Marquesas Islands and the Society Islands.
