= Assara microdoxa =

Scientific classification
- Kingdom: Animalia
- Phylum: Arthropoda
- Class: Insecta
- Order: Lepidoptera
- Family: Pyralidae
- Genus: Assara
- Species: A. microdoxa

Binomial name
- Assara microdoxa (Meyrick, 1879)

Synonyms
- Euzophera microdoxa Meyrick, 1879; Cateremna leptoptila Turner, 1947

Species of moth

Assara microdoxa is a species of snout moth in the genus Assara. It was described by Edward Meyrick in 1879, and is known from Australia.
