= Assara decipula =

Scientific classification
- Domain: Eukaryota
- Kingdom: Animalia
- Phylum: Arthropoda
- Class: Insecta
- Order: Lepidoptera
- Family: Pyralidae
- Genus: Assara
- Species: A. decipula

Binomial name
- Assara decipula (Clarke, 1986)

Synonyms
- Cateremma decipula Clarke, 1986

Species of moth

Assara decipula is a species of snout moth in the genus Assara. It was described by Clarke in 1986. It is found in French Polynesia.
