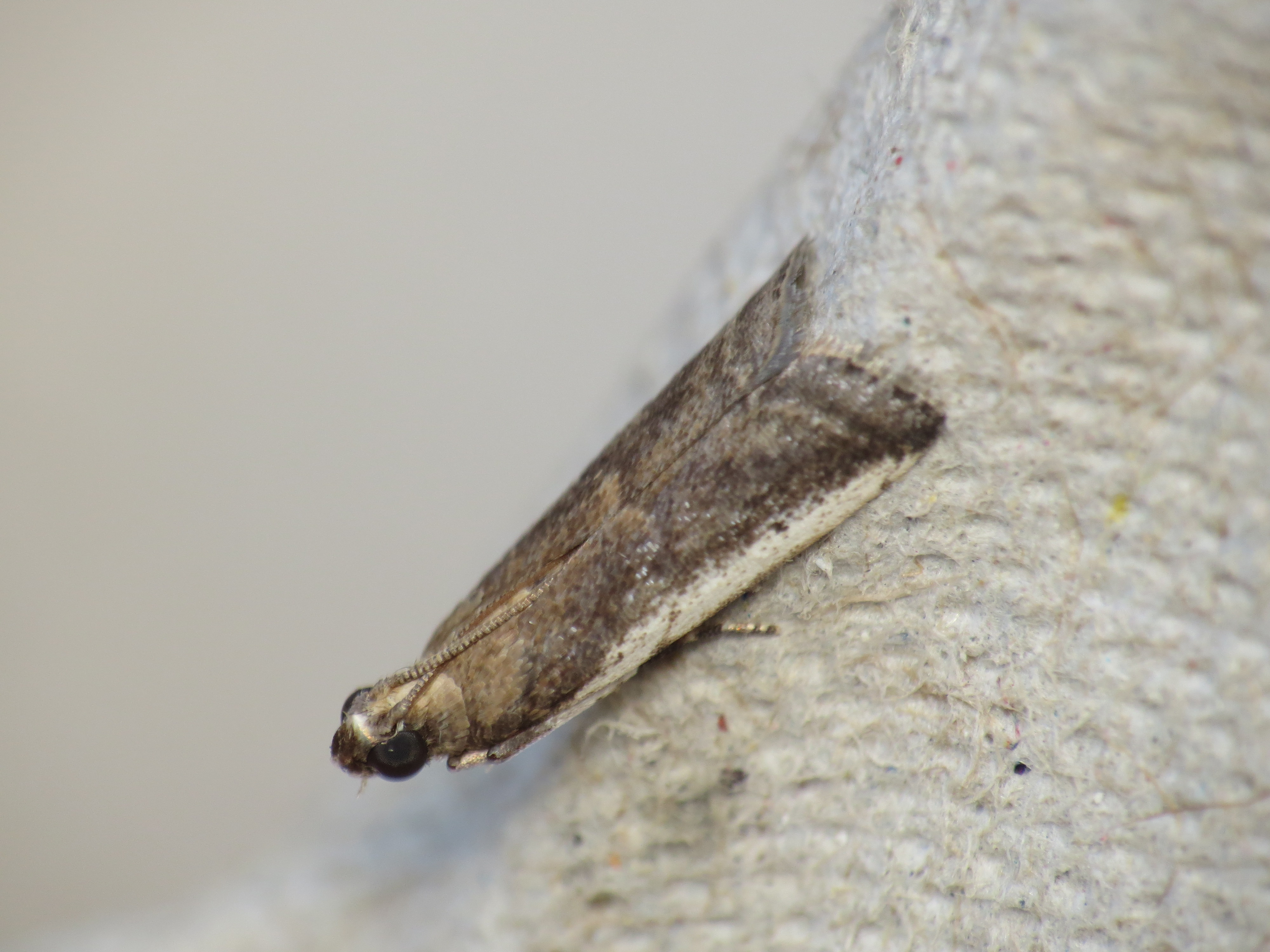

Scientific classification
- Kingdom: Animalia
- Phylum: Arthropoda
- Class: Insecta
- Order: Lepidoptera
- Family: Pyralidae
- Genus: Assara
- Species: A. subarcuella

Binomial name
- Assara subarcuella (Meyrick, 1879)

Synonyms
- Myelois subarcuella Meyrick, 1879

= Assara subarcuella =

Species of moth

Assara subarcuella is a species of snout moth in the genus Assara. It was described by Edward Meyrick in 1879 and is found in Australia.
