= Assara tuberculosa =

Scientific classification
- Kingdom: Animalia
- Phylum: Arthropoda
- Class: Insecta
- Order: Lepidoptera
- Family: Pyralidae
- Genus: Assara
- Species: A. tuberculosa

Binomial name
- Assara tuberculosa (Meyrick, 1933)

Synonyms
- Cateremna tuberculosa Meyrick, 1933

Species of moth

Assara tuberculosa is a species of snout moth in the genus Assara. It was described by Edward Meyrick in 1933 and is known from Myanmar.
