= Assara murasei =

Scientific classification
- Domain: Eukaryota
- Kingdom: Animalia
- Phylum: Arthropoda
- Class: Insecta
- Order: Lepidoptera
- Family: Pyralidae
- Genus: Assara
- Species: A. murasei

Binomial name
- Assara murasei Yamanaka, 2008

Species of moth

Assara murasei is a species of snout moth in the genus Assara. It was described by Hiroshi Yamanaka in 2008 and originates from Japan.
