= Assara exiguella =

Scientific classification
- Domain: Eukaryota
- Kingdom: Animalia
- Phylum: Arthropoda
- Class: Insecta
- Order: Lepidoptera
- Family: Pyralidae
- Genus: Assara
- Species: A. exiguella

Binomial name
- Assara exiguella (Caradja, 1926)

Synonyms
- Heterographis exiguella Caradja, 1926; Homoeosoma albocostella Inoue, 1959

Species of moth

Assara exiguella is a species of snout moth in the genus Assara. It was described by Aristide Caradja in 1926 and is known from China and Japan.

The larvae feed on chestnut. They bore the fruit of their host plant. The species overwinters in fallen chestnut shells and trunks.
