= Assara funerella =

Scientific classification
- Domain: Eukaryota
- Kingdom: Animalia
- Phylum: Arthropoda
- Class: Insecta
- Order: Lepidoptera
- Family: Pyralidae
- Genus: Assara
- Species: A. funerella

Binomial name
- Assara funerella (Ragonot, 1901)

Synonyms
- Hyphantidium funerellum Ragonot, 1901; Heterographis exigurella Caradja, 1926; Assara exigurella; Homoeosoma albocostella Inoue, 1959; Ephestia funerellum

Species of moth

Assara funerella is a species of snout moth in the genus Assara. It was described by Ragonot in 1901. It is found in Taiwan, Japan (Hokkaido, Honshu), China and Korea.

The wingspan is 12–13 mm for males and 16–18 mm for females.

The larvae feed on Pinus thunbergii.
