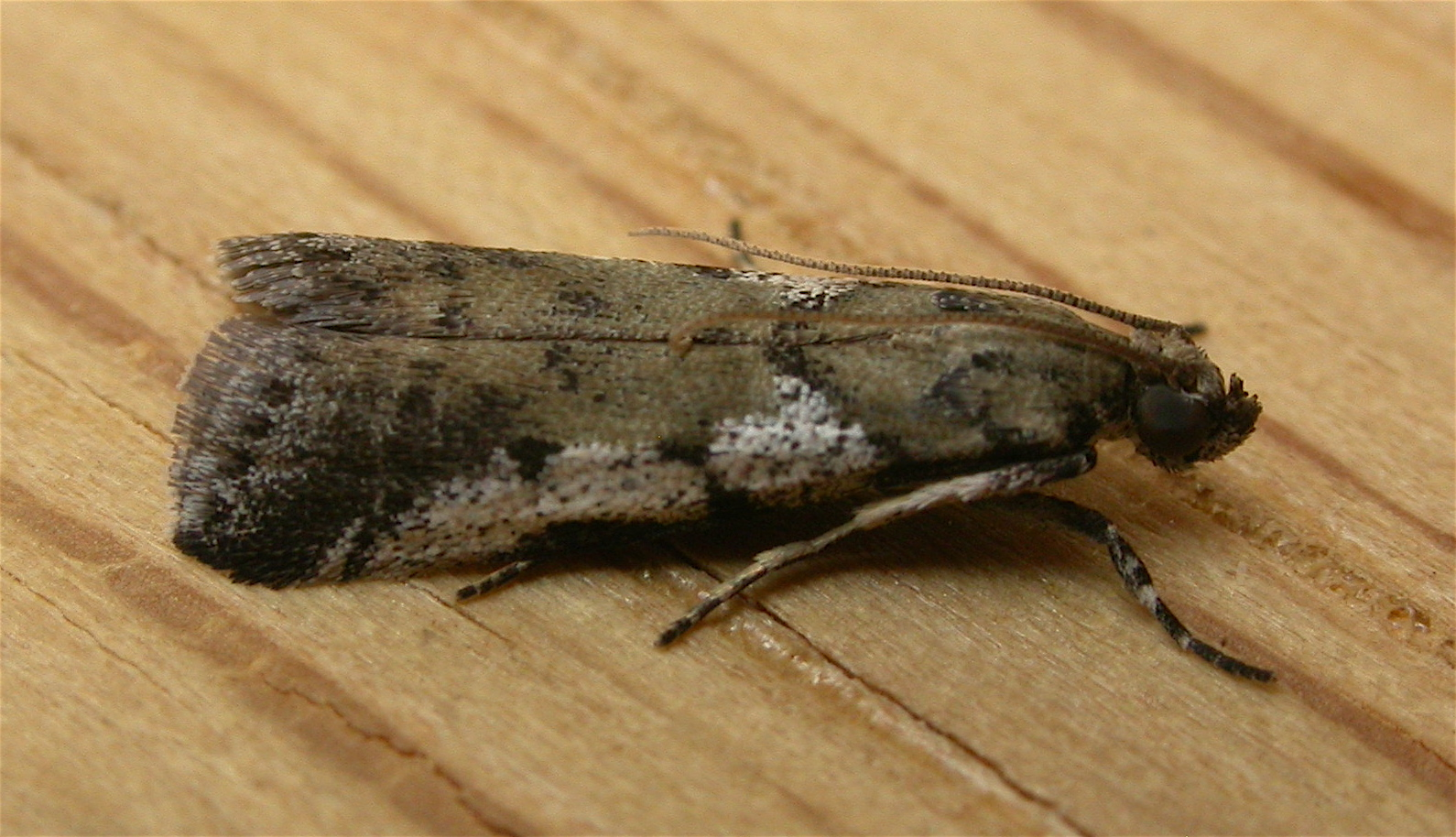

Scientific classification
- Kingdom: Animalia
- Phylum: Arthropoda
- Class: Insecta
- Order: Lepidoptera
- Family: Pyralidae
- Genus: Assara
- Species: A. holophragma

Binomial name
- Assara holophragma (Meyrick, 1887)

Synonyms
- Acrobasis epigrammella Ragonot, 1893; Euzophera holophragma Meyrick, 1887

= Assara holophragma =

Species of moth

Assara holophragma is a species of moth of the family Pyralidae. It is found in Australia.
