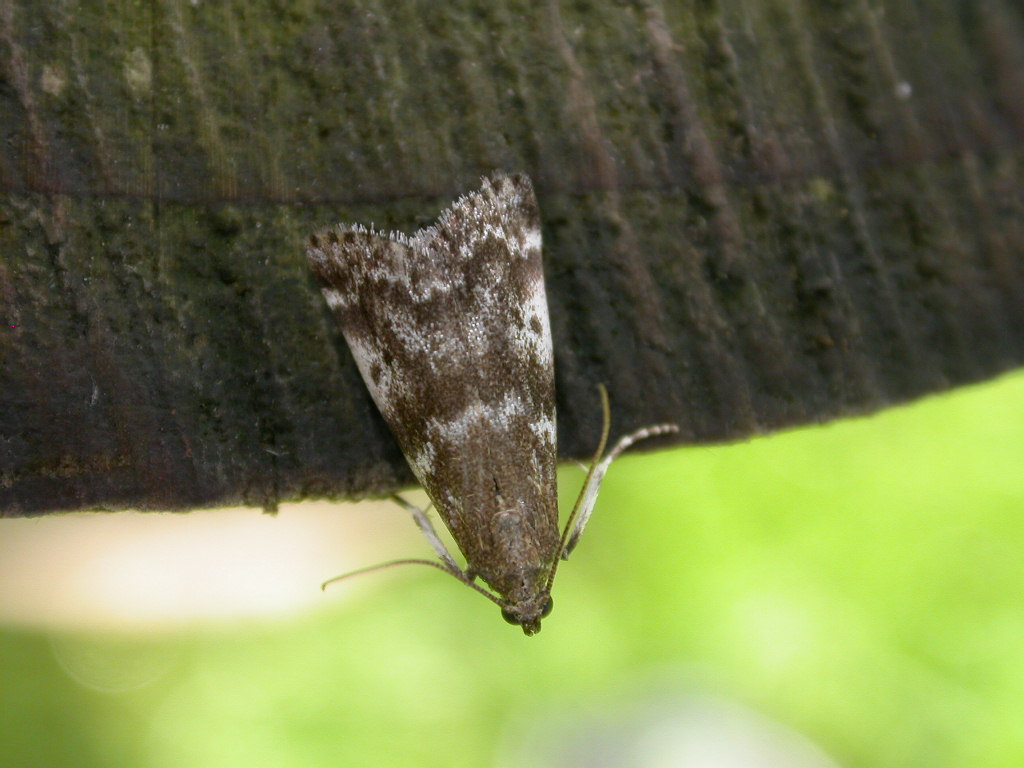

Scientific classification
- Kingdom: Animalia
- Phylum: Arthropoda
- Class: Insecta
- Order: Lepidoptera
- Family: Pyralidae
- Genus: Assara
- Species: A. terebrella

Binomial name
- Assara terebrella (Zincken, 1818)

Synonyms
- Phyctis terebrella Zincken, 1818; Myelois terebrella; Hyphantidium terebrella; Seneca tenebrella

= Assara terebrella =

Species of moth

Assara terebrella is a moth of the family Pyralidae. It is found in Europe, Korea, Japan (Hokkaido), and eastern Siberia.

The wingspan is 21–24 mm. The moth flies from May to September, depending on the location.

The larvae feed on Norway spruce.
