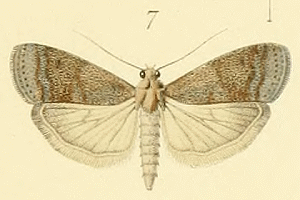

Scientific classification
- Domain: Eukaryota
- Kingdom: Animalia
- Phylum: Arthropoda
- Class: Insecta
- Order: Lepidoptera
- Family: Pyralidae
- Genus: Assara
- Species: A. conicolella

Binomial name
- Assara conicolella (Constant, 1884)

Synonyms
- Euzophera conicolella Constant, 1884

= Assara conicolella =

Species of moth

Assara conicolella is a species of snout moth in the genus Assara. It was described by Alexandre Constant in 1884 and is known from France, Corsica and the Iberian Peninsula.

The wingspan is 13–17 mm.
