= Assara cataxutha =

Scientific classification
- Domain: Eukaryota
- Kingdom: Animalia
- Phylum: Arthropoda
- Class: Insecta
- Order: Lepidoptera
- Family: Pyralidae
- Genus: Assara
- Species: A. cataxutha

Binomial name
- Assara cataxutha (Turner, 1947)

Synonyms
- Cateremna cataxutha Turner, 1947

Species of moth

Assara cataxutha is a species of snout moth in the genus Assara. It was described by Alfred Jefferis Turner in 1947 and is found in Australia.
