= Assara turciella =

Scientific classification
- Kingdom: Animalia
- Phylum: Arthropoda
- Class: Insecta
- Order: Lepidoptera
- Family: Pyralidae
- Genus: Assara
- Species: A. turciella

Binomial name
- Assara turciella Roesler, 1973

Species of moth

Assara turciella is a species of snout moth in the genus Assara. It was described by Roesler, in 1973, and is known from Turkey.
