= Assara proleuca =

Scientific classification
- Domain: Eukaryota
- Kingdom: Animalia
- Phylum: Arthropoda
- Class: Insecta
- Order: Lepidoptera
- Family: Pyralidae
- Genus: Assara
- Species: A. proleuca

Binomial name
- Assara proleuca (Lower, 1903)

Synonyms
- Heterographis proleuca Lower, 1903; Tylochares hemichionea Turner, 1913

Species of moth

Assara proleuca is a species of snout moth in the genus Assara. It was described by Oswald Bertram Lower in 1903 and is found in Australia.
