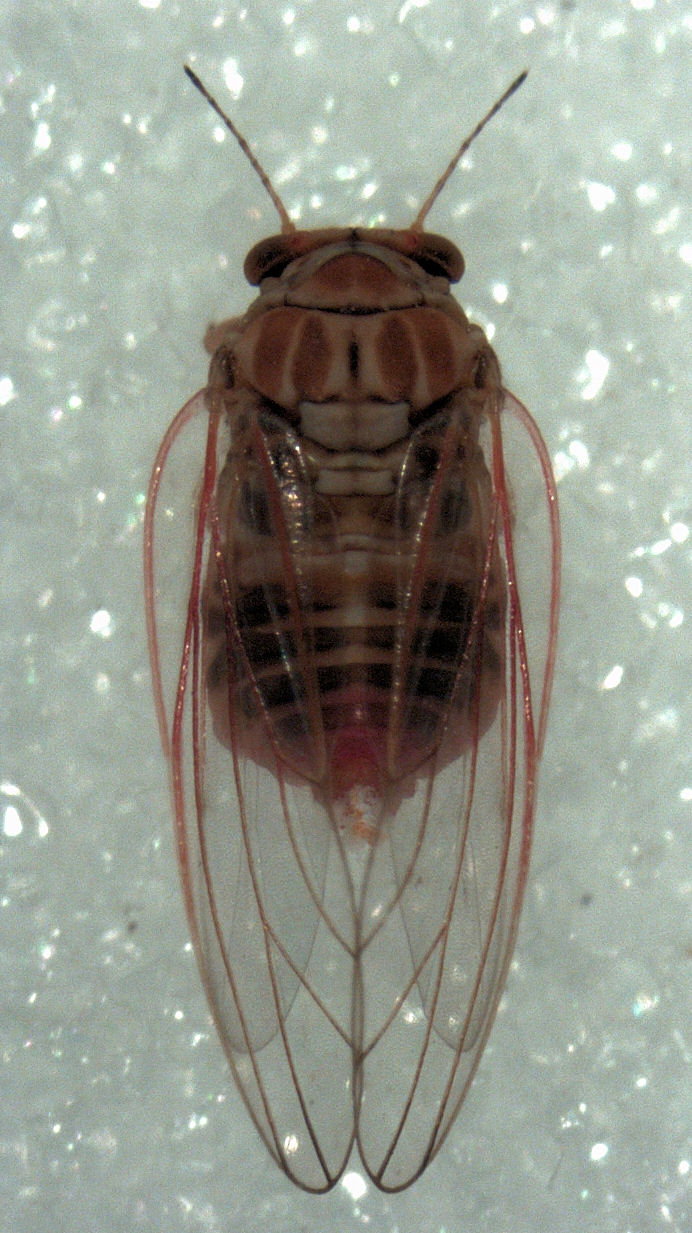
- Adult Cardiaspina fiscella

Scientific classification
- Kingdom: Animalia
- Phylum: Arthropoda
- Class: Insecta
- Order: Hemiptera
- Suborder: Sternorrhyncha
- Family: Aphalaridae
- Subfamily: Spondyliaspidinae
- Genus: Cardiaspina; Crawford, 1911

Species
- See text

Synonyms
- Cardiaspis Schwarz, 1898

= Cardiaspina =

Genus of true bugs

Cardiaspina is a bug genus in the subfamily Spondyliaspidinae.

== Species ==
- Cardiaspina alba
- Cardiaspina albicollaris
- Cardiaspina albitextura
- Cardiaspina artifex
- Cardiaspina bilobata
- Cardiaspina brunnea
- Cardiaspina caestata
- Cardiaspina cerea
- Cardiaspina corbula
- Cardiaspina densitexta
- Cardiaspina fiscella
- Cardiaspina jerramungae
- Cardiaspina maniformis
- Cardiaspina pinnaeformis
- Cardiaspina retator
- Cardiaspina spinifera
- Cardiaspina spinosula
- Cardiaspina squamula
- Cardiaspina tenuitela
- Cardiaspina tetragonae
- Cardiaspina tetrodontae
- Cardiaspina textrix
- Cardiaspina virgulipelta
- Cardiaspina vittaformis
