= Eurotica =

Scientific classification
- Domain: Eukaryota
- Kingdom: Animalia
- Phylum: Arthropoda
- Class: Insecta
- Order: Hemiptera
- Suborder: Sternorrhyncha
- Family: Aphalaridae
- Subfamily: Aphalarinae
- Tribe: Xenaphalarini
- Genus: Eurotica; Loginova, 1962

Species
- See text

Genus of jumping plant lice

Eurotica is a genus of jumping plant lice in the subfamily Aphalarinae and tribe Xenaphalarini, erected by Loginova in 1962.

== Species ==
GBIF includes:

- Eurotica alticola Loginova, 1962
- Eurotica distincta (Loginova, 1960)
