= Assara quadriguttella =

Scientific classification
- Kingdom: Animalia
- Phylum: Arthropoda
- Class: Insecta
- Order: Lepidoptera
- Family: Pyralidae
- Genus: Assara
- Species: A. quadriguttella

Binomial name
- Assara quadriguttella (Walker, 1866)

Synonyms
- Acrobasis quadriguttella Walker, 1866; Cateremna quadriguttella

Species of moth

Assara quadriguttella is a species of snout moth in the genus Assara. It was described by Francis Walker in 1866 and is found in Australia.
