= Rhinocolinae =

Scientific classification
- Domain: Eukaryota
- Kingdom: Animalia
- Phylum: Arthropoda
- Class: Insecta
- Order: Hemiptera
- Suborder: Sternorrhyncha
- Family: Aphalaridae
- Subfamily: Rhinocolinae; Vondráček, 1957

Genera
- See text

Synonyms
- Anomalopsyllinae; Apsyllini

Subfamily of true bugs

Rhinocolinae is a subfamily of insects in the family Aphalaridae.

== Genera ==
- Agonoscena Enderlein, 1914
- Ameroscena Burckhardt & Lauterer, 1989
- Anomalopsylla Tuthill, 1952
- Apsylla Crawford, 1912
- Cerationotum Burckhardt & Lauterer, 1989
- Crucianus Burckhardt & Lauterer, 1989
- Leurolophus Tuthill, 1942
- Lisronia Loginova, 1976
- Megagonoscena Burckhardt & Lauterer, 1989
- Moraniella Loginova, 1972
- Notophyllura Hodkinson, 1986
- Rhinocola Förster, 1848
- Rhusaphalara Park & Lee, 1982
- Tainarys Brèthes, 1920
- †Protoscena Klimaszewski, 1997

Note: † = extinct
