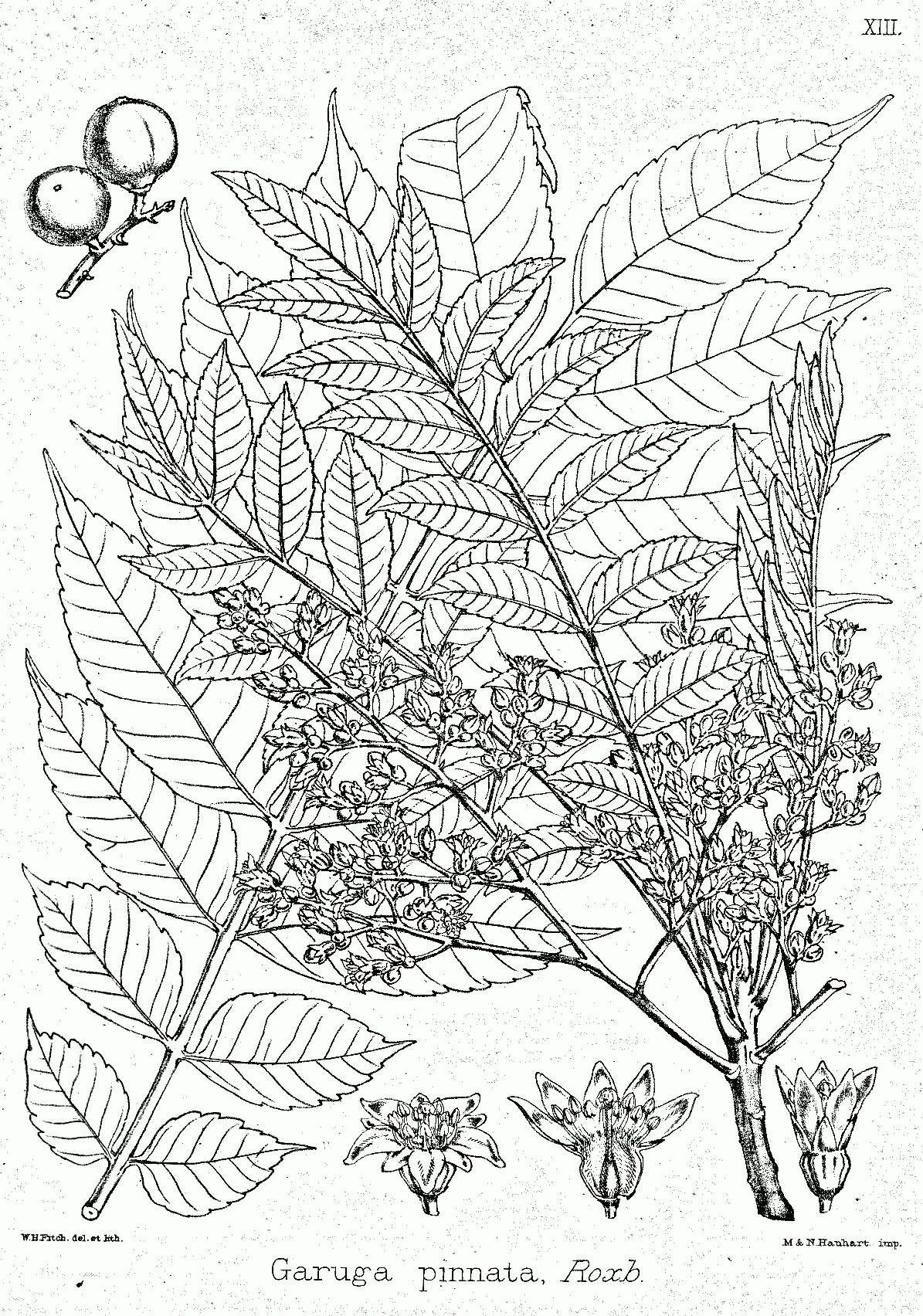

Scientific classification
- Kingdom: Plantae
- Clade: Tracheophytes
- Clade: Angiosperms
- Clade: Eudicots
- Clade: Rosids
- Order: Sapindales
- Family: Burseraceae
- Genus: Garuga
- Species: G. pinnata

Binomial name
- Garuga pinnata Roxb.

Synonyms
- Kunthia pinnata Kuntze; Kunthia cochinensis Dennst. Garuga pharhad Buch.-Ham. Garuga kenghar Buch.-Ham.

= Garuga pinnata =

Species of tree

Garuga pinnata is a deciduous tree species from the family Burseraceae.

It occurs in Asia: from the Indian sub-continent, southern China and Indo-China; in Vietnam it may be called dầu heo. No subspecies are listed in the Catalogue of Life.

== Description and ecology ==
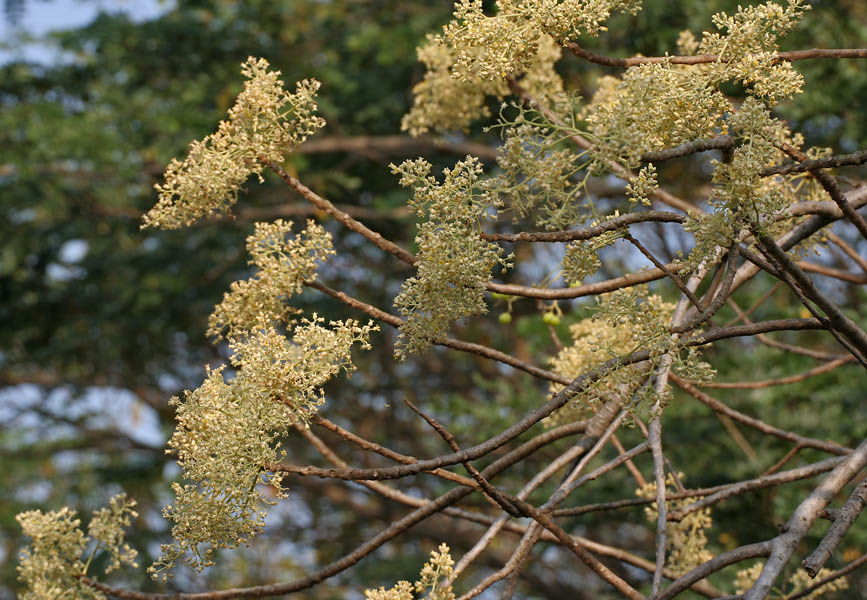
Flowers

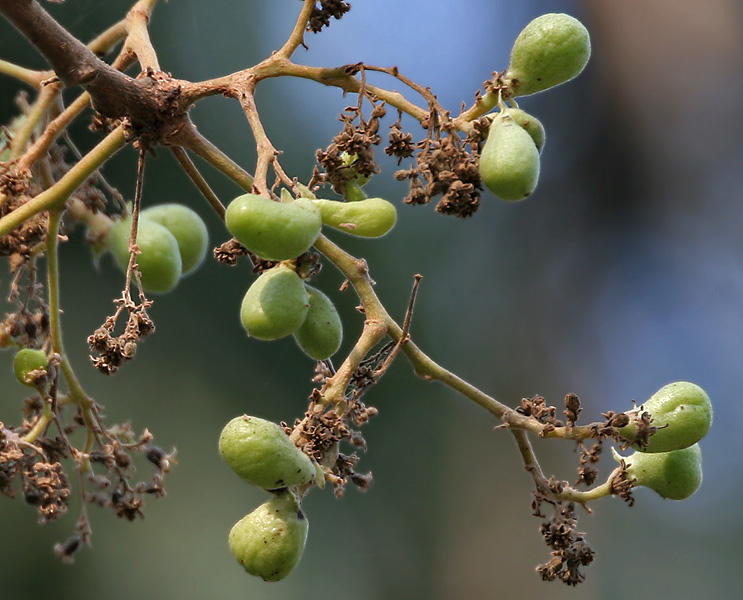
Fruit

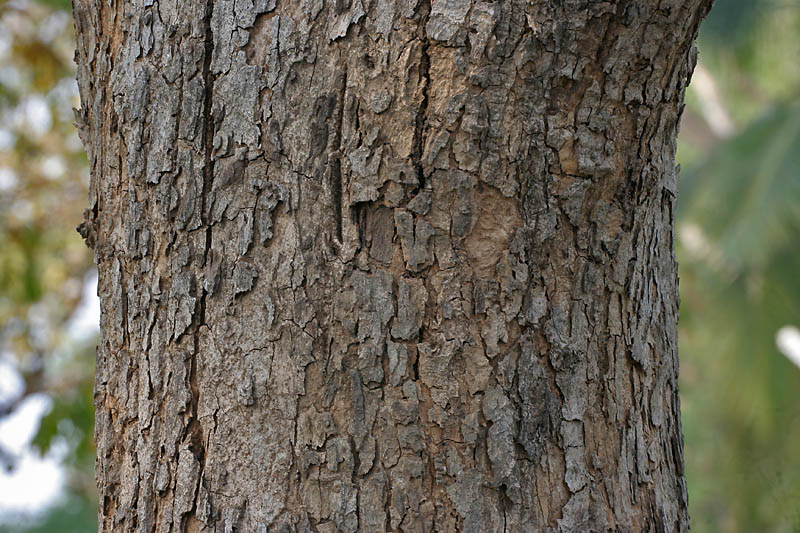
Bark

Plant galls may occur on G. pinnata caused by Phacopteron lentiginosum (Psylloidea: Phacopteronidae), whose populations may be regulated by parasitoids.
