= Assara pallidella =

Scientific classification
- Domain: Eukaryota
- Kingdom: Animalia
- Phylum: Arthropoda
- Class: Insecta
- Order: Lepidoptera
- Family: Pyralidae
- Genus: Assara
- Species: A. pallidella

Binomial name
- Assara pallidella Yamanaka, 1994

Species of moth

Assara pallidella is a species of snout moth in the genus Assara. It was described by Hiroshi Yamanaka in 1994. It is found in Japan.
