= Assara balanophorae =

Scientific classification
- Domain: Eukaryota
- Kingdom: Animalia
- Phylum: Arthropoda
- Class: Insecta
- Order: Lepidoptera
- Family: Pyralidae
- Genus: Assara
- Species: A. balanophorae

Binomial name
- Assara balanophorae Sasaki & Tanaka, 2004

Species of moth

Assara balanophorae is a species of snout moth in the genus Assara. It was described by Sasaki and Tanaka, in 2004, and is known from Japan.
