= Assara korbi =

Scientific classification
- Domain: Eukaryota
- Kingdom: Animalia
- Phylum: Arthropoda
- Class: Insecta
- Order: Lepidoptera
- Family: Pyralidae
- Genus: Assara
- Species: A. korbi

Binomial name
- Assara korbi (Caradja, 1910)

Synonyms
- Euzophera korbi Caradja, 1910

Species of moth

Assara korbi is a species of snout moth in the genus Assara. It was described by Aristide Caradja in 1910 and is known from eastern Asia, including Japan.

The wingspan is about 14 mm for males and 24 mm for females.
