= Assara formosana =

Scientific classification
- Domain: Eukaryota
- Kingdom: Animalia
- Phylum: Arthropoda
- Class: Insecta
- Order: Lepidoptera
- Family: Pyralidae
- Genus: Assara
- Species: A. formosana

Binomial name
- Assara formosana Yoshiyasu, 1991

Species of moth

Assara formosana is a species of snout moth in the genus Assara. It was described by Yoshiyasu in 1991. It is found in Taiwan and Japan.
