= Assara hoeneella =

Scientific classification
- Domain: Eukaryota
- Kingdom: Animalia
- Phylum: Arthropoda
- Class: Insecta
- Order: Lepidoptera
- Family: Pyralidae
- Genus: Assara
- Species: A. hoeneella

Binomial name
- Assara hoeneella Roesler, 1965

Species of moth

Assara hoeneella is a species of snout moth in the genus Assara. It was described by Roesler in 1965, and is known from China and Japan.
