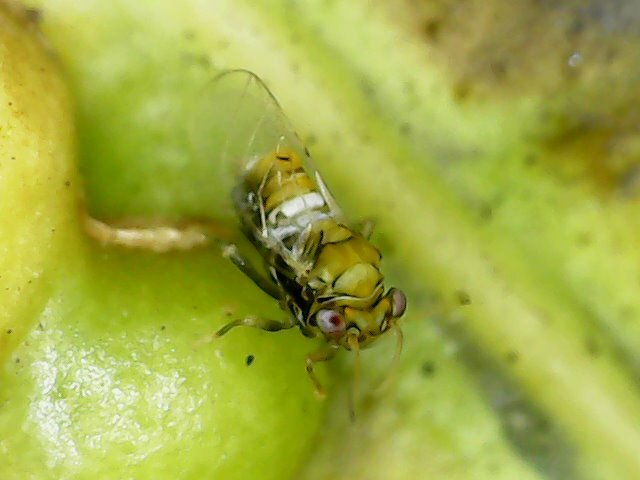
- Pseudophacopteron tuberculatum

Scientific classification
- Kingdom: Animalia
- Phylum: Arthropoda
- Class: Insecta
- Order: Hemiptera
- Suborder: Sternorrhyncha
- Family: Aphalaridae
- Subfamily: Phacopteroninae; Heslop-Harrison, 1958

Synonyms
- Phacopteronidae

= Phacopteroninae =

Family of true bugs

Phacopteroninae is a subfamily of bugs in the family Aphalaridae, previously placed at family level.

== Genera ==
In the recent (2021) review, the following were included:

1. Cornegenapsylla Yang & Li, 1982 (syn. Neophacopteron)
2. Phacopteron Buckton, 1896 (syn. Phacosema)
3. Phacosemoides Costa Lima & Guitton, 1962
4. Pseudophacopteron Enderlein, 1921 (syn. Chineura)
5. †Sulciana Klimaszewski, 1998
