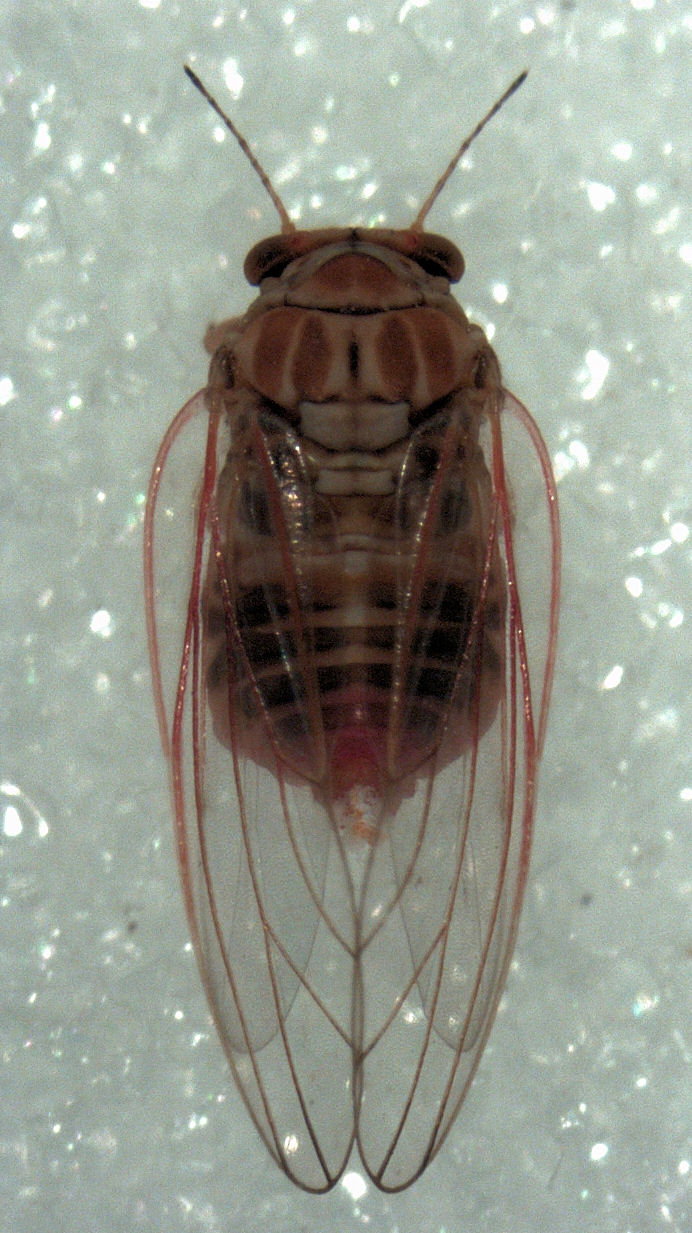
- Adult Cardiaspina fiscella

Scientific classification
- Kingdom: Animalia
- Phylum: Arthropoda
- Clade: Pancrustacea
- Class: Insecta
- Order: Hemiptera
- Suborder: Sternorrhyncha
- Family: Aphalaridae
- Genus: Cardiaspina
- Species: C. fiscella

Binomial name
- Cardiaspina fiscella Taylor, 1962

= Cardiaspina fiscella =

Species of true bug

Cardiaspina fiscella, the brown basket lerp or brown lace lerp, is a jumping plant louse species in the genus Cardiaspina originally found in Australia. It spread to New Zealand where it was found in 1996 near the Auckland airport. It feeds on eucalyptus, especially swamp mahogany, and is found in Victoria, eastern New South Wales, and southeastern Queensland, as well as the capital territory (ACT) around Canberra and on Norfolk Island. Cardiaspina fiscella has five nymphal instars, and as the instars moult they add a layer to their outside covering (casing), known as the "lerp".
