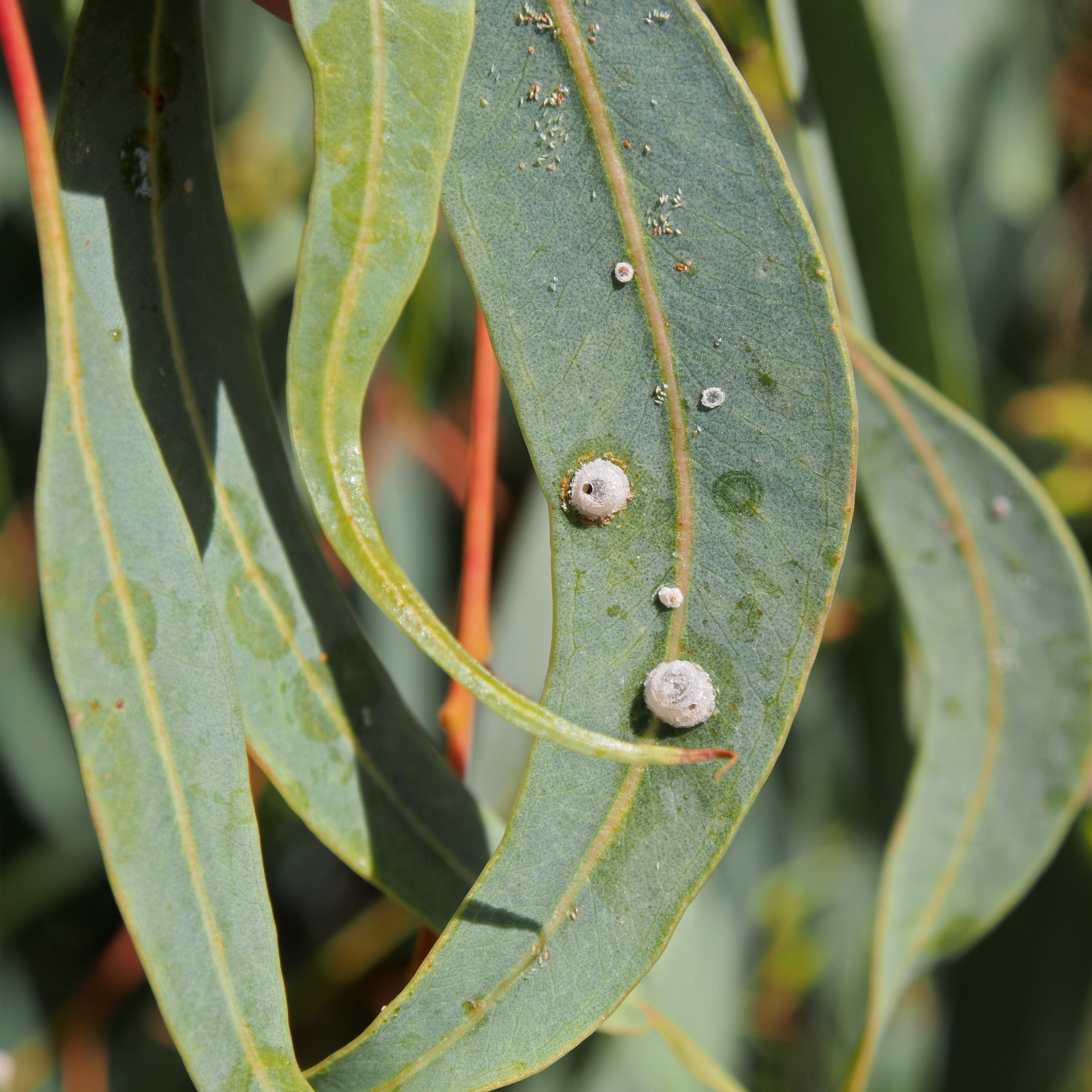
- Glycaspis brimblecombei on the host plant Eucalyptus camaldulensis

Scientific classification
- Domain: Eukaryota
- Kingdom: Animalia
- Phylum: Arthropoda
- Class: Insecta
- Order: Hemiptera
- Suborder: Sternorrhyncha
- Family: Aphalaridae
- Subfamily: Spondyliaspidinae
- Genus: Glycaspis; Taylor, 1960

= Glycaspis =

Genus of true bugs

Glycaspis is a genus of plant-parasitic insects in the family Aphalaridae. There are at least two described species in Glycaspis.

== Species ==
These two species belong to the genus Glycaspis:

- Glycaspis brimblecombei Moore, 1964 (red gum lerp psyllid)
- Glycaspis granulata (Froggatt, 1901)
