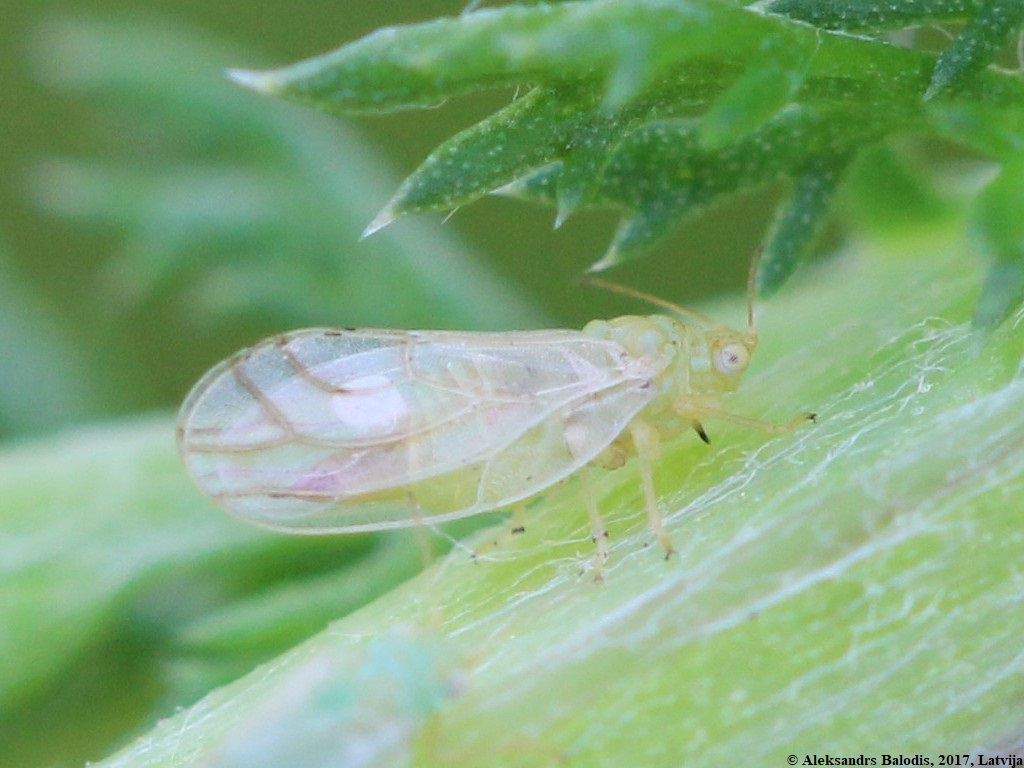
- Craspedolepta subpunctata

Scientific classification
- Domain: Eukaryota
- Kingdom: Animalia
- Phylum: Arthropoda
- Class: Insecta
- Order: Hemiptera
- Suborder: Sternorrhyncha
- Family: Aphalaridae
- Tribe: Aphalarini
- Genus: Craspedolepta; Enderlein, 1921

Synonyms
- Neocraspedolepta Conci & Tamanini, 1986

= Craspedolepta =

Genus of true bugs

Craspedolepta is a genus of true bugs belonging to the family Aphalaridae.

The species of this genus are found in Europe, Japan and Northern America. European species include: C. artemisiae, C. flavipennis, C. malachitica, C. nebulosa, C. nervosa, C. sonchi and C. subpunctata. Craspedolepta nervosa and five other species occur in the British Isles.

== Species ==
The Global Biodiversity Information Facility lists:

1. Craspedolepta aberrantis Loginova, 1962
2. Craspedolepta alevtinae (Andrianova, 1948)
3. Craspedolepta americana Klimaszewski, 1979
4. Craspedolepta angusta Loginova, 1962
5. Craspedolepta angustipennis (Crawford, 1911)
6. Craspedolepta anomola (Crawford, 1914)
7. Craspedolepta araneosa Loginova, 1962
8. Craspedolepta araxica Gegechkori, 1981
9. Craspedolepta arcyosticta Li, 2011
10. Craspedolepta armazhi Gegechkori, 1973
11. Craspedolepta artemisiae (Foerster, 1848)
12. Craspedolepta azerbaidzhanica Gegechkori, 1990
13. Craspedolepta brevicauda Loginova, 1962
14. Craspedolepta bugijina Klimaszewski, 1971
15. Craspedolepta bulgarica Klimaszewski, 1961
16. Craspedolepta campestrella Ossiannilsson, 1987
17. Craspedolepta campestris Lauterer & Burckhardt, 2004
18. Craspedolepta campstrella Ossiannilsson, 1987
19. Craspedolepta canadensis Journet & Vickery, 1979
20. Craspedolepta capitata Loginova, 1962
21. Craspedolepta carinthica Ossiannilsson, 1963
22. Craspedolepta caudata (Crawford, 1914)
23. Craspedolepta chonsamri Klimaszewski, 1968
24. Craspedolepta chovsgoli Klimaszewski, 1971
25. Craspedolepta conspersa (Löw, 1888)
26. Craspedolepta constricta (Caldwell, 1936)
27. Craspedolepta convexa Baeva, 1970
28. Craspedolepta costulata Loginova, 1962
29. Craspedolepta crinita Loginova, 1962
30. Craspedolepta crispati Lauterer & Burckhardt, 2004
31. Craspedolepta descurainiae Li, 2011
32. Craspedolepta discifera Loginova, 1962
33. Craspedolepta dracunculi Loginova, 1962
34. Craspedolepta dunhuangana Li, 2011
35. Craspedolepta eas (McAtee, 1918)
36. Craspedolepta emeljanovi Loginova, 1966
37. Craspedolepta espinosa Loginova, 1963
38. Craspedolepta euryoptera Li, 2011
39. Craspedolepta euthamiae Burckhardt & Halbert, 2020
40. Craspedolepta evaiana Klimaszewski, 1963
41. Craspedolepta filifoliae Tishechkin, 2007
42. Craspedolepta flava (Kuwayama, 1908)
43. Craspedolepta flavida (Caldwell, 1938)
44. Craspedolepta flavipennis (Foerster, 1848)
45. Craspedolepta formosa Loginova, 1962
46. Craspedolepta fraterna Loginova, 1966
47. Craspedolepta fumida (Caldwell, 1938)
48. Craspedolepta furcata (Caldwell, 1936)
49. Craspedolepta galactoptera Li, 2011
50. Craspedolepta gibberosinerva Li, 2005
51. Craspedolepta gloriosa Loginova, 1962
52. Craspedolepta gossypina Li, 2011
53. Craspedolepta gulisashvilii Gegechkori, 1976
54. Craspedolepta gutierreziae (Klyver, 1931)
55. Craspedolepta hyojana Kwon & Kwon, 2020
56. Craspedolepta iltoica Gegechkori, 1990
57. Craspedolepta immaculata Li, 1990
58. Craspedolepta inarticulata Loginova, 1962
59. Craspedolepta indeserta Bajeva, 1978
60. Craspedolepta inedita Bajeva, 1978
61. Craspedolepta innoxia (Foerster, 1848)
62. Craspedolepta intermedia Loginova, 1962
63. Craspedolepta intricata Loginova, 1962
64. Craspedolepta japonica (Klimaszewski, 1989)
65. Craspedolepta jucunda Loginova, 1972
66. Craspedolepta kerzhneri Loginova, 1963
67. Craspedolepta kudarensis Baeva, 1979
68. Craspedolepta kwonii (Klimaszewski, 1997)
69. Craspedolepta laevigata Loginova, 1962
70. Craspedolepta lapsus Journet & Vickery, 1979
71. Craspedolepta latior Wagner, 1944
72. Craspedolepta leucotaenia Li, 2005
73. Craspedolepta limitanea Baeva, 1973
74. Craspedolepta lineolata Loginova, 1962
75. Craspedolepta linosiridis Loginova, 1962
76. Craspedolepta longisaeta Andrianova & Klimaszewski, 1983
77. Craspedolepta macula Journet & Vickery, 1979
78. Craspedolepta maculidracunculi Journet & Vickery, 1979
79. Craspedolepta maculimagna Journet & Vickery, 1979
80. Craspedolepta maculipilosa Journet & Vickery, 1979
81. Craspedolepta maculosa (Löw, 1881)
82. Craspedolepta magna Journet & Vickery, 1979
83. Craspedolepta magnicauda (Ramirez Gomez, 1960)
84. Craspedolepta malachitica (Dahlbom, 1851)
85. Craspedolepta manica Bajeva, 1978
86. Craspedolepta martini (Van Duzee, 1924)
87. Craspedolepta medvedevi Loginova, 1962
88. Craspedolepta megrica Gegechkori, 1976
89. Craspedolepta melanoplura Li, 2005
90. Craspedolepta memoranda Klimaszewski, 1971
91. Craspedolepta menyuanana Li, 2011
92. Craspedolepta merzi Spodek & Burckhardt, 2017
93. Craspedolepta minuta (Caldwell, 1938)
94. Craspedolepta minutissima (Crawford, 1911)
95. Craspedolepta minutistylus (Klyver, 1931)
96. Craspedolepta mitjaevi Loginova, 1963
97. Craspedolepta miyatakeai Klimaszewski, 1989
98. Craspedolepta montana Loginova, 1962
99. Craspedolepta multispina Loginova, 1963
100. Craspedolepta munda Loginova, 1979
101. Craspedolepta nebulosa (Zetterstedt, 1828)
102. Craspedolepta nervosa (Foerster, 1848)
103. Craspedolepta nota Journet & Vickery, 1979
104. Craspedolepta novenipunctata Li, 2011
105. Craspedolepta numerica (Caldwell, 1941)
106. Craspedolepta nupera (Van Duzee, 1923)
107. Craspedolepta ochracea (Provancher, 1872)
108. Craspedolepta olgae Baeva, 1973
109. Craspedolepta omissa Wagner, 1944
110. Craspedolepta oregonensis Journet & Vickery, 1979
111. Craspedolepta parvula Journet & Vickery, 1979
112. Craspedolepta pictilis Bajeva, 1978
113. Craspedolepta pilosa (Oshanin, 1870)
114. Craspedolepta pinicola (Crawford, 1914)
115. Craspedolepta polygramma Li, 2011
116. Craspedolepta polysticta Li, 2011
117. Craspedolepta pontica Dobreanu & Manolache, 1962
118. Craspedolepta pulchella (Crawford, 1911)
119. Craspedolepta puncticulata Li, 2011
120. Craspedolepta punctulata Loginova, 1962
121. Craspedolepta pusilla Andrianova & Klimaszewski, 1983
122. Craspedolepta quadrimaculata Li, 2011
123. Craspedolepta radiosa Loginova, 1972
124. Craspedolepta remaudierei Burckhardt & Lauterer, 1993
125. Craspedolepta retracta Klimaszewski, 1968
126. Craspedolepta russellae Klimaszewski, 1977
127. Craspedolepta santolinae Rapisarda, 1989
128. Craspedolepta schaeferi Lauterer & Burckhardt, 2004
129. Craspedolepta schwarzi (Ashmead, 1904)
130. Craspedolepta scurra Journet & Vickery, 1979
131. Craspedolepta setosa (Wagner, 1947)
132. Craspedolepta sima Loginova, 1972
133. Craspedolepta sinuata (Caldwell, 1936)
134. Craspedolepta smithsonia (Klimaszewski, 1979)
135. Craspedolepta sonchi (Foerster, 1848)
136. Craspedolepta spinata Li, 2011
137. Craspedolepta spinellosa Li, 2011
138. Craspedolepta spinosa Park & Lee, 1982
139. Craspedolepta strunkovae Bajeva, 1978
140. Craspedolepta suaedae (Crawford, 1914)
141. Craspedolepta subpunctata (Foerster, 1848)
142. Craspedolepta tadshikistanica Baeva, 1973
143. Craspedolepta terminata Loginova, 1962
144. Craspedolepta topicalis Loginova, 1962
145. Craspedolepta vancouverensis (Klyver, 1931)
146. Craspedolepta veaziei (Patch, 1911)
147. Craspedolepta veredica Bajeva, 1978
148. Craspedolepta vestita Baeva, 1967
149. Craspedolepta villosa Loginova, 1962
150. Craspedolepta viridis (Crawford, 1914)
151. Craspedolepta vulgaris (Journet & Vickery, 1979)
152. Craspedolepta weii Li, 2011
153. Craspedolepta yongjungi Cho & Burckhardt, 2017
