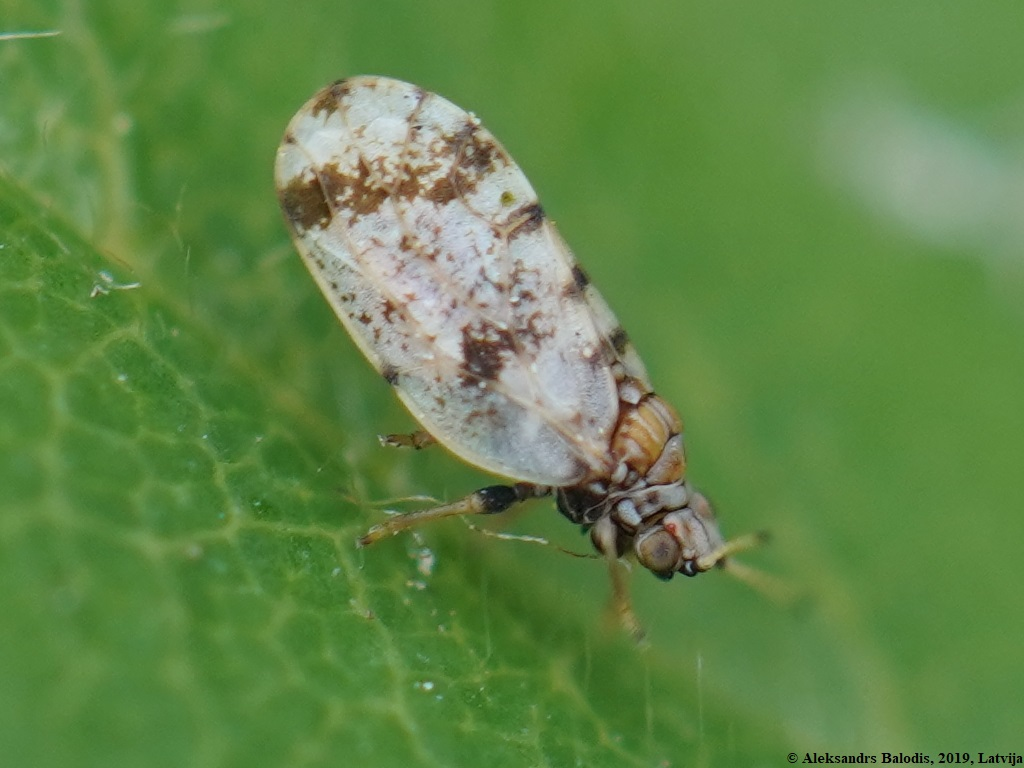
- Aphalara ulicis

Scientific classification
- Domain: Eukaryota
- Kingdom: Animalia
- Phylum: Arthropoda
- Class: Insecta
- Order: Hemiptera
- Suborder: Sternorrhyncha
- Family: Aphalaridae
- Tribe: Aphalarini
- Genus: Aphalara; Förster, 1848

Species
- See text

= Aphalara =

Genus of true bugs

Aphalara is a genus of jumping plant lice (psyllid), typical of the family Aphalaridae and tribe Aphalarini.

== Species ==
The following species are recognised in FLOW and the Global Biodiversity Information Facility:

1. Aphalara affinis (Zetterstedt, 1828)
2. Aphalara avicularis Ossiannilsson, 1981
3. Aphalara bitaeniana Li & Yang, 1999
4. Aphalara borealis Heslop-Harrison, 1949
5. Aphalara calthae (Linnaeus, 1761)
6. Aphalara confusa Caldwell, 1937
7. Aphalara crassinervis Rudow, 1875
8. Aphalara curta Caldwell, 1937
9. Aphalara dentata Caldwell, 1937
10. Aphalara exilis (Weber & Mohr, 1804)
11. Aphalara fasciata Kuwayama, 1908
12. Aphalara freji Burckhardt & Lauterer, 1997
13. Aphalara grandicula (Gegechkori, 1981)
14. Aphalara hedini Enderlein, 1933
15. Aphalara itadori (Shinji, 1938)
16. Aphalara jungsukae Kwon, 1983
17. Aphalara loca Caldwell, 1937
18. Aphalara loginovae Burckhardt & Lauterer, 1993
19. Aphalara longicaudata Wagner & Franz, 1961
20. Aphalara maculata Caldwell, 1937
21. Aphalara maculipennis Löw, 1886
22. Aphalara manitobaensis Caldwell, 1938
23. Aphalara monticola Hodkinson, 1973
24. Aphalara morimotoi Miyatake, 1997
25. Aphalara multipunctata Kuwayama, 1908
26. Aphalara nigra Caldwell, 1937
27. Aphalara nigrimaculosa Gegechkori, 1981
28. Aphalara nubifera Patch, 1912
29. Aphalara ortegae Burckhardt, Cort & Queiroz, 2020
30. Aphalara ossiannilssoni Mathur, 1975
31. Aphalara panli (Weber & Mohr)
32. Aphalara pauli Loginova, 1979
33. Aphalara persicaria (Caldwell, 1937)
34. Aphalara poligoni (Shinji, 1938)
35. Aphalara polygoni Foerster, 1848
36. Aphalara purpurascens (Hartig, 1841)
37. Aphalara ritteri Burckhardt, Cort & Queiroz, 2020
38. Aphalara rumicis Mally, 1894
39. Aphalara sasajii Miyatake, 2001
40. Aphalara sauteri Burckhardt, 1983
41. Aphalara siamensis Burckhardt & Lauterer, 1997
42. Aphalara sibirica Loginova, 1961
43. Aphalara simila Caldwell, 1937
44. Aphalara steironemicola Richards, 1970
45. Aphalara taiwanensis Burckhardt & Lauterer, 1997
46. Aphalara tecta Maskell, 1898
47. Aphalara ulicis Foerster, 1848
48. Aphalara wrangeli Gegechkori, 1990
49. Aphalara wulingica Li, 2011

Names brought to synonymy

- Aphalara elegans De Bergevin, 1932, a synonym for Colposcenia elegans (Bergevin, 1932)
