= Rhinocola =

Scientific classification
- Domain: Eukaryota
- Kingdom: Animalia
- Phylum: Arthropoda
- Class: Insecta
- Order: Hemiptera
- Suborder: Sternorrhyncha
- Family: Aphalaridae
- Subfamily: Rhinocolinae
- Genus: Rhinocola; Förster, 1848

Genus of insects

Rhinocola is a genus of true bugs belonging to the family Aphalaridae.

The species of this genus are found in Europe and Northern America.

Species:

- Rhinocola aceris (Linnaeus, 1758)
- Rhinocola eugeniae Kieffer & Herbst, 1911
