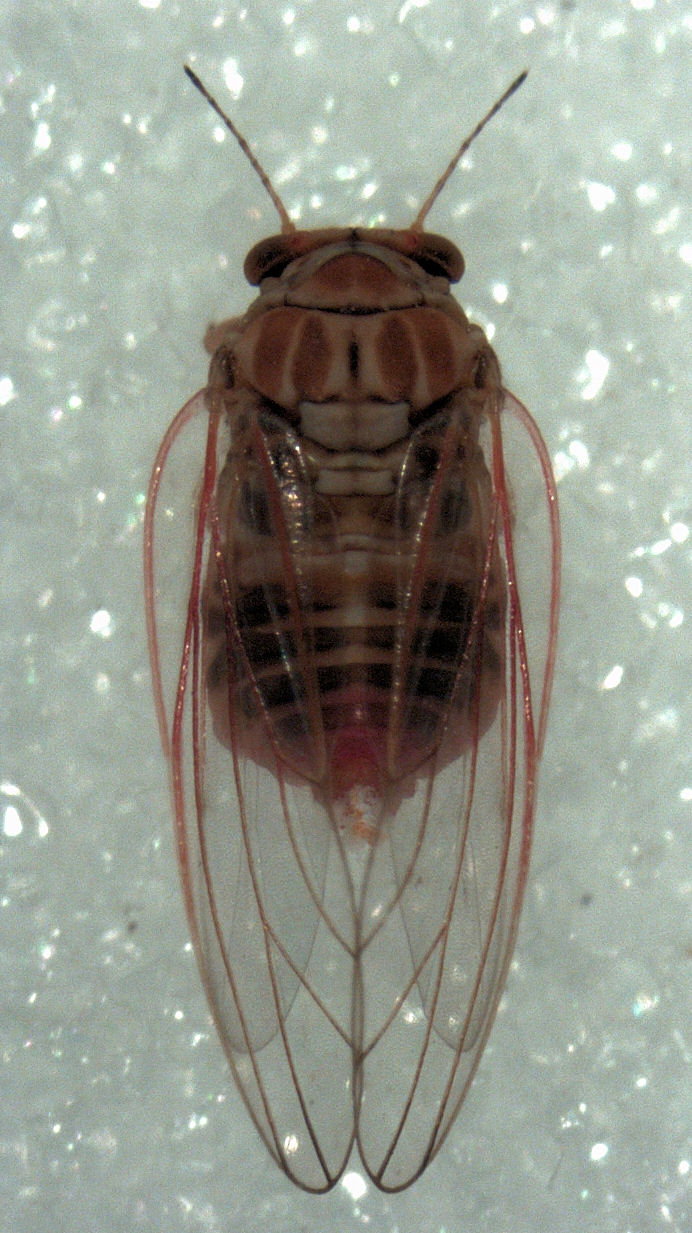
- Adult Cardiaspina fiscella

Scientific classification
- Kingdom: Animalia
- Phylum: Arthropoda
- Class: Insecta
- Order: Hemiptera
- Suborder: Sternorrhyncha
- Superfamily: Psylloidea
- Family: Aphalaridae; Löw, 1879

= Aphalaridae =

Family of true bugs

Aphalaridae is a family of insects in the superfamily Psylloidea, commonly known as jumping plant lice or psyllids with a worldwide distribution. It was first described in 1879 by Austrian Entomologist, Franz Löw along with the tribe Aphalarini. Like other psyllids, aphalarids are small, sap-sucking insects, and they are often highly host-specific.

The family contains approximately 749 species. The classification of the family was revised in 2012 and further amended in 2021 to include new molecular and morphological data.

== Morphology ==
Aphalaridae is a morphologically various family. Adults are typically between 1-5mm in length, and come in a variety of colors, often shades of green and brown.

The main synapomorphy for the family is in the nymphal stages, where the tarsal arolium (a pad-esque structure on the tarsus) is reduced to completely absent.

The adult stages are fairly unique, differing from other aphalarids, making the taxonomy even more difficult to resolve. Some key features to identifying the genera and subfamilies are the presence, or lack of, two genal cones on the front of the head. When these cones are present, their length can vary from short and rounded to long and pointed. On the wing's leading edge, a pterostigma (a thickened cell) may be present or absent. Generally, the hind wings of aphalarids are enlarged for jumping. The metatibia has a number of thick, black-tipped abical spurs. In many species, these are arranged in an open crown of sclerotised apical spurs.

== Ecology and host plants ==
The life cycle of Aphalarids typically consists of an egg stage, followed by five nymphal instars, and finally the winged adult.

Aphalaridae are herbivores that feed on the phloem (sap) of plants. Most species are highly host-specific. The aster family, Asteraceae, is host to many species in the genus Craspedolepta. Polygonaceae (the knotweed family) is host to many species in the genus Aphalara. Spondyliaspidinae, the subfamily, is known primarily for their association with Eucalyptus. Nymphs in this family produce a protective covering called a "lerp", which is why they are commonly referred to as "lerp insects". The genus Agonoscena includes the common pistachio psyllid (Agonoscena pistaciae), which is a significant pest in the pistachio industry.

== Distribution and habitat ==
Aphalarids can be found on all continents except Antarctica. The habitat of Aphalaridae species depends on the presence of its host plant. Because their hosts grow in a range of environments, Aphalaridae species can be found in habitats ranging from arid shrublands to temperate forests.

== Economic importance ==
While most species are relatively inconspicuous, some are considered major pests. Pests in this group include the subfamily Spondyliaspidinae, which are known as "lerp insects" in Australia, and the pistachio psyllid (Agonoscena pistaciae), which is an agricultural pest.

== Taxonomy ==
This family was previously thought to contain five subfamilies, but in the 2021 review by Burckhardt, et al., the following seven subfamilies were identified:

1. Aphalarinae Löw, 1879
2. Cecidopsyllinae Li, 2011
  1. Cecidopsylla Kieffer, 1905
3. Microphyllurinae Burckhardt, Ouvrard & Percy, 2021
  1. Microphyllurus Li, 2002
4. Phacopteroninae Heslop-Harrison, 1958
5. Rhinocolinae Vondráček, 1957
6. Spondyliaspidinae Schwarz, 1898
7. Togepsyllinae Bekker-Migdisova, 1973

While Burckhardt et al. (2021) assign these seven subfamilies to Aphalaridae, the phylogenetic relationships between the subfamilies are not fully resolved and molecular analyses did not include representatives from Cecidopsyllinae or Togepsyllinae.

A 2024 molecular study on Bulgarian aphalarids recovered these relationships:

- Aphalaridae
  - Rhinocolinae
  - - Spondyliaspidinae
    - - Phacopteroninae
      - Aphalarinae

=== Overview of genera ===
BioLib includes:

1. Agelaeopsylla Taylor, 1990
2. Agonoscena Enderlein, 1914
3. Ameroscena Burckhardt & Lauterer, 1989
4. Anoeconeossa Taylor, 1987
5. Anomalopsylla Tuthill, 1952
6. Aphalara Förster, 1848
7. Apsylla Crawford, 1912
8. Australopsylla Tuthill & Taylor, 1955
9. Blastopsylla Taylor, 1985
10. Blepharocosta Taylor, 1992
11. Boreioglycaspis Moore, 1964
12. Brachystetha Loginova, 1964
13. Caillardia Bergevin, 1931
14. Cardiaspina Crawford, 1911
15. Cerationotum Burckhardt & Lauterer, 1989
16. Colposcenia Enderlein, 1929
17. Craspedolepta Enderlein, 1921
18. Crastina Loginova, 1964
19. Creiis Scott, 1882
20. Crucianus Burckhardt & Lauterer, 1989
21. Cryptoneossa Taylor, 1990
22. Ctenarytaina Ferris & Klyver, 1932
23. Dasypsylla Froggatt, 1900
24. Epheloscyta Loginova, 1976
25. Eriopsylla Froggatt, 1901
26. Eucalyptolyma Froggatt, 1901
27. Eumetoecus Loginova, 1961
28. Eurhinocola Crawford, 1912
29. Eurotica Loginova, 1962
30. Glycaspis Taylor, 1960
31. Gyropsylla Brèthes, 1921
32. Hodkinsonia Burckhardt, Esperito-Santo, Fernandes & Malenovský, 2004
33. Hyalinaspis Taylor, 1960
34. Kenmooreana Taylor, 1984
35. Lanthanaphalara Tuthill, 1959
36. Lasiopsylla Froggatt, 1900
37. Leptospermonastes Taylor, 1987
38. Leurolophus Tuthill, 1942
39. Limataphalara Hodkinson, 1992
40. Lisronia Loginova, 1976
41. Megagonoscena Burckhardt & Lauterer, 1989
42. Moraniella Loginova, 1972
43. Neaphalara Brown & Hodkinson, 1988
44. Notophyllura Hodkinson, 1986
45. Phellopsylla Taylor, 1960
46. Phyllolyma Scott, 1882
47. Platyobria Taylor, 1987
48. Rhinocola Förster, 1848
49. Rhodochlanis Loginova, 1964
50. Rhombaphalara Loginova, 1964
51. Rhusaphalara Park & Lee, 1982
52. Spondyliaspis Signoret, 1879
53. Syncarpiolyma Froggatt, 1901
54. Syncoptozus Enderlein, 1918
55. Tainarys Brèthes, 1920
56. Togepsylla Kuwayama, 1931
57. Xenaphalara Loginova, 1961

extinct genera

1. Eogyropsylla Klimaszewski, 1993 †
2. Necropsylla Scudder, 1890 †
3. Paleopsylloides Bekker-Migdisova, 1985 †
4. Proeurotica Bekker-Migdisova, 1985 †
5. Protoscena Klimaszewski, 1997 †
