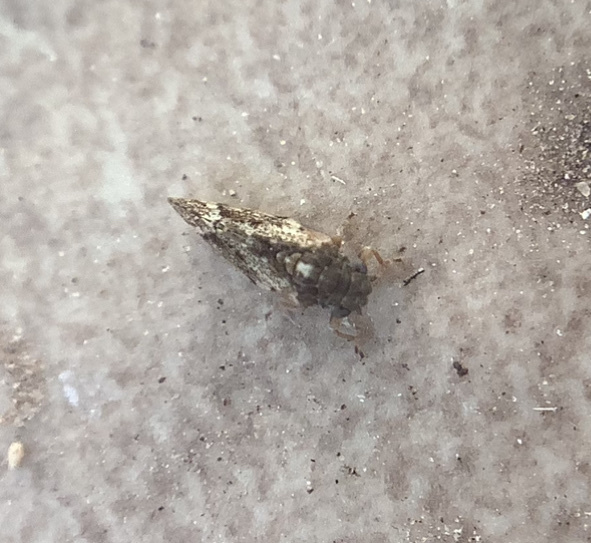

Scientific classification
- Kingdom: Animalia
- Phylum: Arthropoda
- Class: Insecta
- Order: Hemiptera
- Suborder: Sternorrhyncha
- Family: Carsidaridae
- Genus: Pachypsylla
- Species: P. celtidisvesicula

Binomial name
- Pachypsylla celtidisvesicula (Riley, 1890)

= Pachypsylla celtidisvesicula =

North American insect species

Pachypsylla celtidisvesicula, commonly called the hackberry blistergall psyllid, is a species of aphalarid psyllid found in North America. The nymphs of this species induce blister-like galls on the leaves of various hackberries (Celtis spp.) throughout its range.

It closely related to the more common hackberry nipplegall psyllid (Pachypsylla celtidismamma), which it strongly resembles as an adult.
