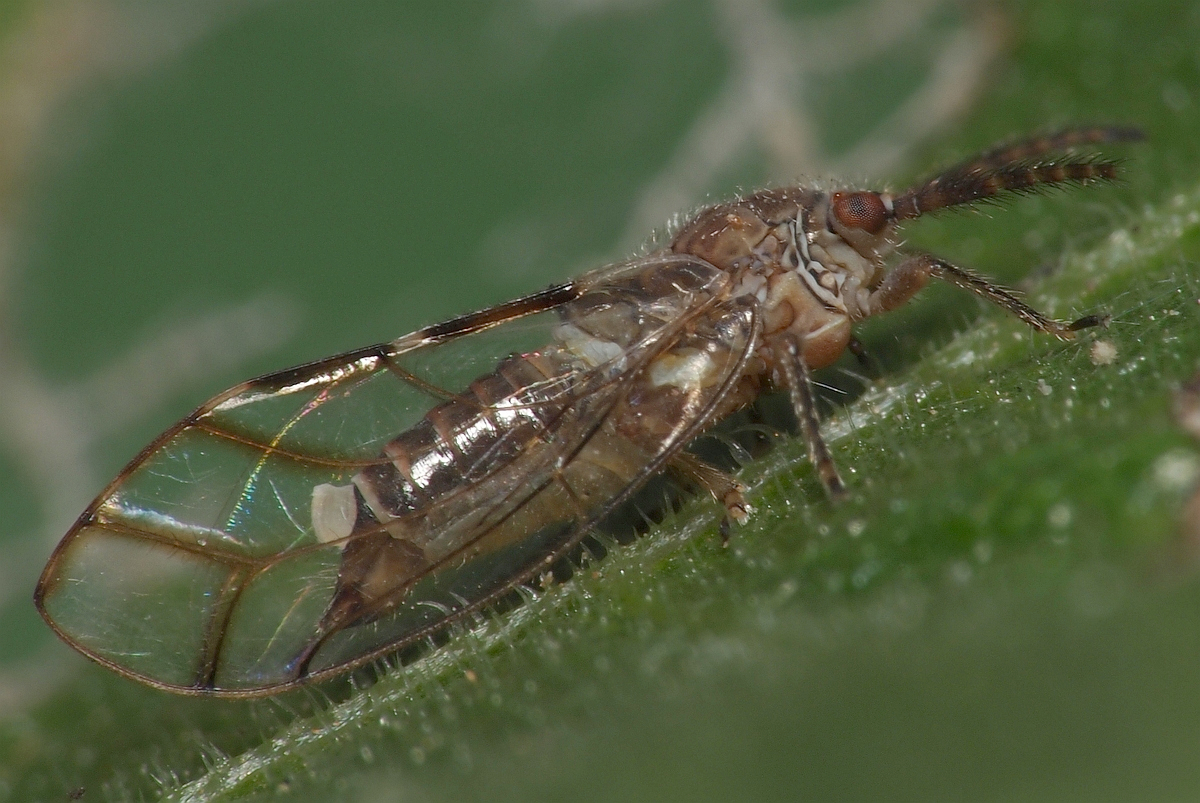
- Homotoma ficus

Scientific classification
- Kingdom: Animalia
- Phylum: Arthropoda
- Clade: Pancrustacea
- Class: Insecta
- Order: Hemiptera
- Suborder: Sternorrhyncha
- Superfamily: Psylloidea
- Family: Homotomidae; Heslop-Harrison, 1958

Genera
- See text

= Homotomidae =

Family of true bugs

Homotomidae was a family of small phloem-feeding bugs in the superfamily of jumping plantlice, but recently (2021) subsumed to the subfamily Homotominae Heslop-Harrison, 1958 in the family Carsidaridae.

== Hostplants ==
The species in this family feed almost exclusively on plants of the Moraceae genus Ficus. The only exception is the genus Triozamia, with its three species feeding on different varieties of Antiaris toxicaria, also in the Moraceae family.

== Systematics ==
Hollis & Broomfield (1989) propose the following classification within Homotomidae:

- subfamily Dynopsyllinae Becker-Migdisova, 1973
  - tribe Diceraopsyllini Hollis & Broomfield, 1989
    - Diceraopsylla Crawford, 1912 (1 sp.)
  - tribe Dynopsyllini Becker-Migdisova, 1973
    - subtribe Dynopsyllina Becker-Migdisova, 1973
      - Dynopsylla Crawford, 1913 (3 spp.)
      - Austrodynopsylla Hollis & Broomfield, 1989 (1 sp.)
    - subtribe Triozamiina Becker-Migdisova, 1973
      - Triozamia Vondráček, 1963 (3 spp.)
      - Afrodynopsylla Hollis & Broomfield, 1989 (1 sp.)
- subfamily Macrohomotominae White & Hodkinson, 1985
  - tribe Edenini Bhanotar, Ghosh & Ghosh, 1972
    - Mycopsylla Froggatt, 1901 (9 spp.)
  - tribe Macrohomotomini White & Hodkinson, 1985
    - Macrohomotoma Kuwayama, 1908 (14 spp.)
    - Pseudoeriopsylla Newstead, 1911 (6 spp.)
- subfamily Homotominae Heslop-Harrison, 1958
  - tribe Homotomini Heslop-Harrison, 1958
    - Homotoma Guérin-Méneville, 1844 (31 spp.)
  - tribe Synozini Becker-Migdisova, 1973
    - Synoza Enderlein, 1918 (3 spp.)
