= Paurocephala =

Scientific classification
- Kingdom: Animalia
- Phylum: Arthropoda
- Class: Insecta
- Order: Hemiptera
- Suborder: Sternorrhyncha
- Family: Liviidae
- Subfamily: Liviinae
- Genus: Paurocephala; Crawford, 1913

Synonyms
- Marpsylla; Thoracocorna Klimaszewski, 1970: Paurocephala (Thoracocorna); Pauroterga

Genus of true bugs

External image
- Images at iNaturalist

Paurocephala is a genus of African, Oriental and Australian plant lice belonging to the Liviinae (previously it has been placed in the obsolete subfamily Paurocephalinae or tribe Paurocephalini); the genus was erected by David Crawford in 1913.

Mifsud and Burckhardt's review provides information on the distribution of species and their host plants: which include species in the families:

- Cannabaceae: notably the genus Trema
- Malvaceae: notably Abutilon, Gossypium, Kydia and Pterospermum spp.
- Moraceae: notably Ficus and Artocarpus spp.
- Urticaceae: notably Boehmeria spp.

== Species ==
Paurocephala is now described as an "Old World genus with 9 Afrotropical and 42 Indo-Australian described species". Four species from the Americas, previously placed here, were not considered to be congeneric with the Old World species and have been transferred to the closely related genus Diclidophlebia. The 2002 review included the following:

1. Paurocephala abutili Mifsud & Burckhardt, 2003 - Kenya
2. Paurocephala ambigua Mifsud & Burckhardt, 2002 - Sulawesi
3. Paurocephala artocarpae Braza and Calilung, 1981 - Philippines (Luzon), Malesia (Sabah, Sulawesi)
4. Paurocephala bifasciata Kuwayama, 1931 - China (Hong Kong record), Taiwan, Japan and Vietnam
5. Paurocephala boehmeriae Mifsud & Burckhardt, 2002 - China (Hong Kong)
6. Paurocephala boxi Mifsud & Burckhardt, 2002 - Ghana
7. Paurocephala brendelli Mifsud & Burckhardt, 2002 - Peninsular Malaysia
8. Paurocephala brevicephala (Crawford, 1917) - Philippines (Mindanao, Palawan) and Sarawak
9. Paurocephala calcarata Mifsud & Burckhardt, 2002 - Fiji Islands
10. Paurocephala chonchaiensis Boselli, 1929 - China (Hong Kong record) and Japan
11. Paurocephala curvata Mifsud & Burckhardt, 2002 - Papua New Guinea and Indonesia (Sulawesi)
12. Paurocephala dayak Mifsud & Burckhardt, 2002 - Sabah, Sarawak, Brunei and Singapore
13. Paurocephala distincta Mifsud & Burckhardt, 2002 - India and Sri Lanka
14. Paurocephala elegans Mifsud & Burckhardt, 2002 - Indonesia (Sulawesi)
15. Paurocephala gossypii Russell, 1943 - Zaire, Sudan and Malawi
16. Paurocephala hollisi Mifsud & Burckhardt, 2002 - Tanzania
17. Paurocephala insolita Mifsud & Burckhardt, 2002 - Angola
18. Paurocephala javanica Mifsud & Burckhardt, 2002 - Indonesia (Java)
19. Paurocephala kleinhojiae Uichanco, 1921 - Philippines (Luzon, Mindanao) and Taiwan
20. Paurocephala lienhardi Mifsud & Burckhardt, 2002 - Malaysia (Sabah)
21. Paurocephala Iii Mifsud & Burckhardt, 2002 - Indonesia (Sulawesi)
22. Paurocephala longiantennata Mifsud & Burckhardt, 2002 - Papua New Guinea
23. Paurocephala lucida Mifsud & Burckhardt, 2002 - Ethiopia
24. Paurocephala macrochaetis Mifsud & Burckhardt, 2002 - Indonesia (Sulawesi)
25. Paurocephala maculipennis Uichanco, 1921 - Philippines including Palawan
26. Paurocephala marginata Mifsud & Burckhardt, 2002 - Indonesia (Sulawesi)
27. Paurocephala martini Mifsud & Burckhardt, 2002 - Singapore
28. Paurocephala mathuri Mifsud & Burckhardt, 2002 - India (Uttar Pradesh)
29. Paurocephala medleri Mifsud & Burckhardt, 2002 - Nigeria
30. Paurocephala minuta Crawford, 1919 - Philippines (Luzon)
31. Paurocephala muiri Mifsud & Burckhardt, 2002 - Indonesia (Tanimbar Island)
32. Paurocephala muta Mifsud & Burckhardt, 2002 - India
33. Paurocephala oceanica Mifsud & Burckhardt, 2002 - Andaman Islands
34. Paurocephala palawanensis Mifsud & Burckhardt, 2002 - Philippines (Palawan)
35. Paurocephala papuana Mifsud & Burckhardt, 2002 - Papua New Guinea
36. Paurocephala phalaki Mathur, 1975 - India (Bengal, Madras)
37. Paurocephala polaszeki Mifsud & Burckhardt, 2002 - Bangladesh
38. Paurocephala psylloptera Crawford, 1913 - West Malesia including Philippines
39. Paurocephala pterospermi Mifsud & Burckhardt, 2002 - Palawan and Sabah
40. Paurocephala robusta Mifsud & Burckhardt, 2002 - Philippines (Palawan)
41. Paurocephala russellae Mathur, 1975 - India (Uttar Pradesh)
42. Paurocephala sauteri Enderlein, 1914 - China and Taiwan
43. Paurocephala setifera (Crawford, 1919) - Philippines (Luzon)
44. Paurocephala similis Mifsud & Burckhardt, 2002 - Indonesia (Sulawesi)
45. Paurocephala sinuata Mifsud & Burckhardt, 2002 - Ghana and Nigeria
46. Paurocephala stephaniella Mifsud & Burckhardt, 2002 - Indonesia (Sulawesi)
47. Paurocephala stigmaticalis Mifsud & Burckhardt, 2002 - Malaysia (Sabah)
48. Paurocephala sulawesiana Mifsud & Burckhardt, 2002 - Indonesia (Sulawesi)
49. Paurocephala trematos Yang et al., 1986 - Taiwan, Japan, Thailand, China and Malaysia
50. Paurocephala urenae Russell, 1946 - Zaire
51. Paurocephala wilderi Crawford, 1927 - American Samoa
