= Allocarsidara =

Scientific classification
- Kingdom: Animalia
- Phylum: Arthropoda
- Class: Insecta
- Order: Hemiptera
- Suborder: Sternorrhyncha
- Family: Carsidaridae
- Subfamily: Carsidarinae
- Genus: Allocarsidara; Hollis, 1987

Genus of true bugs

External image
- Images at iNaturalist

Allocarsidara is a genus of plant lice in the subfamily Carsidarinae; it was originally erected by David Hollis in 1987. Species distribution records include India and South-East Asia.

Allocarsidara malayensis has been identified as a pest of durian in South-East Asia.

== Species ==
The Global Biodiversity Information Facility lists:

1. Allocarsidara bakeri Hollis, 1987
2. Allocarsidara elongata Hollis, 1987
3. Allocarsidara incognita Hollis, 1987
4. Allocarsidara iriana Hollis, 1987
5. Allocarsidara juliana (Crawford, 1919)
6. Allocarsidara malayensis (Crawford, 1919)

== See also ==
- List of durian diseases and pests
