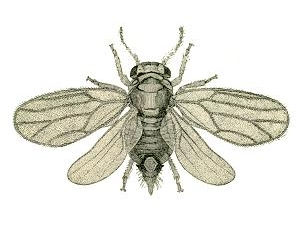
- Diclidophlebia sterculiae

Scientific classification
- Kingdom: Animalia
- Phylum: Arthropoda
- Class: Insecta
- Order: Hemiptera
- Suborder: Sternorrhyncha
- Family: Liviidae
- Subfamily: Liviinae
- Genus: Diclidophlebia; Crawford, 1920

Synonyms
- Aconopsylla, Gyroza, Haplaphalara; Heteroneura Crawford nec Fallén; Paraphalaroida, Sinuonemopsylla, Woldaia

= Diclidophlebia =

Genus of true bugs

External image
- Images at iNaturalist

Diclidophlebia is a genus of plant lice in the subfamily Liviinae, erected by David Crawford in 1920.

Like the closely related genus Paurocephala, it is known to include crop pest species including "Haplaphalara sp." (bao-bao, possibly D. durio) which has been reported to infest durian in the Philippines. Diclidophlebia is a replacement name for Heteroneura with synonyms that include Haplaphalara and Sinuonemopsylla; this genus includes species recorded from the Americas as well as African, Asian and Australian tropical areas and has been subject to several taxonomic treatments.

== Species ==
The Catalogue of Life currently (2025) lists:

1. Diclidophlebia adelaidae (Braza & Calilung, 1981)
2. Diclidophlebia crassiflagellata (Burckhardt, 1996)
3. Diclidophlebia dahli (Rübsaamen, 1905)
4. Diclidophlebia dombeyae Burckhardt, Aléné & Ouvrard, 2006
5. Diclidophlebia durio (Heslop-Harrison, 1952)
6. Diclidophlebia eastopi Vondráček, 1964
7. Diclidophlebia excetrodendri (Li & Yang, 1991)
8. Diclidophlebia fava (Brown & Hodkinson, 1988)
9. Diclidophlebia fremontiae (Klyver, 1930) – type species (as Paurocephala fremontiae Klyver, 1930)
10. Diclidophlebia grewiae (Kandasamy, 1986)
11. Diclidophlebia harrisoni Osisanya, 1969
12. Diclidophlebia heterotrichi (Caldwell & Martorell, 1952)
13. Diclidophlebia irvingiae Burckhardt, Aléné & Ouvrard, 2006
14. Diclidophlebia lanceomedia (Brown & Hodkinson, 1988)
15. Diclidophlebia leptonychiae Burckhardt, Aléné & Ouvrard, 2006
16. Diclidophlebia longitarsata (Brown & Hodkinson, 1988)
17. Diclidophlebia lucens Burckhardt, Hanson & Madrigal, 2005
18. Diclidophlebia maculata (Crawford, 1919)
19. Diclidophlebia maculipennis (Brown & Hodkinson, 1988)
20. Diclidophlebia menoni (Mathur, 1975)
21. Diclidophlebia nebulosa (Brown & Hodkinson, 1988)
22. Diclidophlebia oceanica (Crawford, 1919)
23. Diclidophlebia parinari Burckhardt, Aléné & Ouvrard, 2006
24. Diclidophlebia paucipunctata (Brown & Hodkinson, 1988)
25. Diclidophlebia paucivena (Brown & Hodkinson, 1988)
26. Diclidophlebia pilosa Burckhardt, Aléné & Ouvrard, 2006
27. Diclidophlebia setinervis (Burckhardt, 1996)
28. Diclidophlebia smithi Burckhardt, Morais & Picanço, 2006
29. Diclidophlebia sterculiae (Froggatt, 1901)
30. Diclidophlebia trimaculata (Mathur, 1975)
31. Diclidophlebia tuberculata Burckhardt, Aléné & Ouvrard, 2006
32. Diclidophlebia tuxtlaensis (Conconi, 1972)
33. Diclidophlebia wagneri Burckhardt, Aléné & Ouvrard, 2006
34. Diclidophlebia xuani Messi, 1998

Fossil species

- †Diclidophlebi asubita (Klimaszewski, 1998)

== See also ==
- List of durian diseases and pests
- Media related to Diclidophlebia at Wikimedia Commons
