= Strophingia =

Scientific classification
- Domain: Eukaryota
- Kingdom: Animalia
- Phylum: Arthropoda
- Class: Insecta
- Order: Hemiptera
- Suborder: Sternorrhyncha
- Family: Liviidae
- Subfamily: Euphyllurinae
- Genus: Strophingia; Enderlein, 1914

Genus of true bugs

Strophingia is a genus of plant lice belonging to the family Liviidae. The species of this genus are found in Europe. Strophingia ericae and S. cinereae are found in Britain on heathers such as Calluna vulgaris.

== Species ==
The Global Biodiversity Information Facility lists:

1. Strophingia arborea Loginova, 1976
2. Strophingia australis Hodkinson, 1981
3. Strophingia canariensis Bastin, Burckhardt & Ouvrard, 2023
4. Strophingia cinereae Hodkinson, 1971
5. Strophingia ericae (Curtis, 1835)
6. Strophingia fallax Loginova, 1976
7. Strophingia harteni Hodkinson, 1981
8. Strophingia orientalis (Crawford, 1915)
9. Strophingia paligera Bastin, Burckhardt & Ouvrard, 2023
10. Strophingia proxima Hodkinson, 1981
