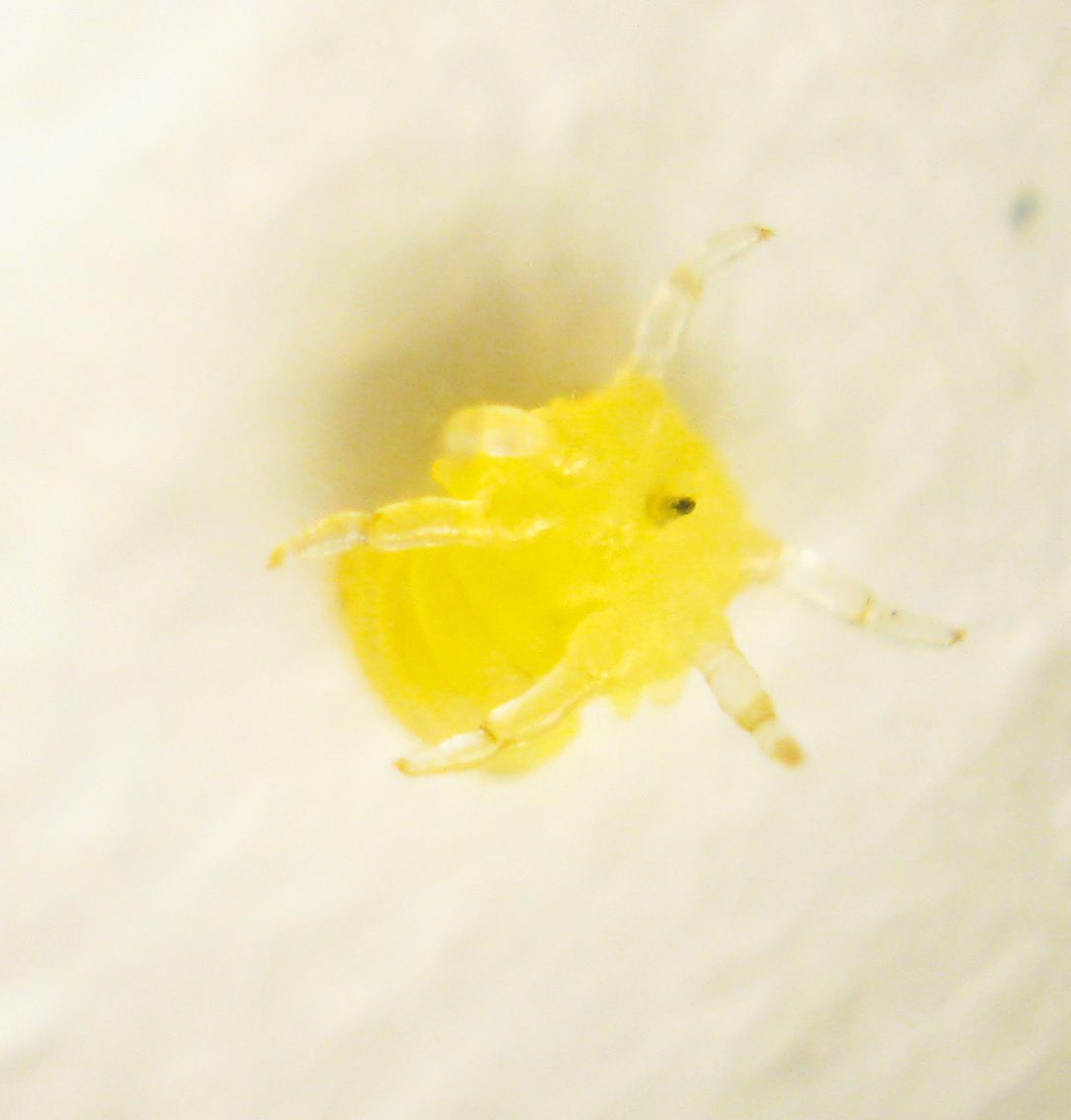
- Pachypsylla celtidisumbilicus, nymph

Scientific classification
- Domain: Eukaryota
- Kingdom: Animalia
- Phylum: Arthropoda
- Class: Insecta
- Order: Hemiptera
- Suborder: Sternorrhyncha
- Family: Carsidaridae
- Subfamily: Pachypsyllinae; Crawford, 1914

= Pachypsyllinae =

Subfamily of true bugs

Pachypsyllinae is a plant louse subfamily, now placed in the family Carsidaridae.

== Genera ==
A recent (2021) review identified three genera:

1. Celtisaspis Yang & Li, 1982
2. Pachypsylla Riley, 1885 (syn. Blastophysa)
3. Tetragonocephala Crawford, 1914
