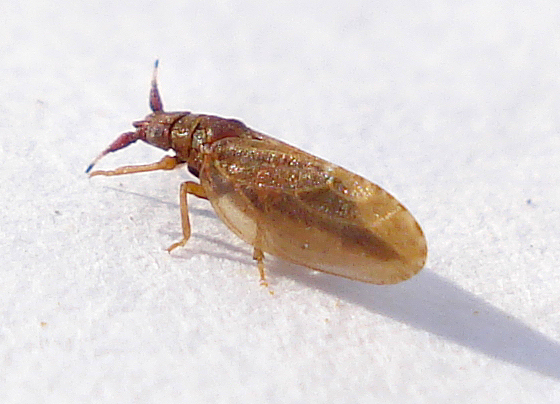
- Livia junci

Scientific classification
- Domain: Eukaryota
- Kingdom: Animalia
- Phylum: Arthropoda
- Class: Insecta
- Order: Hemiptera
- Suborder: Sternorrhyncha
- Family: Liviidae
- Subfamily: Liviinae
- Genus: Livia; Latreille, 1802

= Livia (insect) =

Genus of insects

Livia is the type genus of plant lice in the family Liviidae, found in the Palaearctic and Nearctic realms. Nymphs form galls in the developing shoots of rushes and sedges.

== Species ==
The Global Biodiversity Information Facility lists:

1. Livia bifasciata Provancher, 1886
2. Livia caricis Crawford, 1914
3. Livia circuliloculla Li, 2011
4. Livia crawfordi Hodkinson & Bird, 2000
5. Livia crefeldensis Mink, 1855
6. Livia jesoensis Matsumura, 1908
7. Livia junci (Schrank, 1789) - type species (as Chermes junci Schrank, 1789)
8. Livia keratocola Li, 2011
9. Livia khaziensis Heslop-Harrison, 1949
10. Livia latifasca Li, 2005
11. Livia leucoptera Loginova, 1974
12. Livia limbata (Waga, 1842)
13. Livia lobata Hodkinson & Bird, 2000
14. Livia maculipennis (Fitch, 1857)
15. Livia manitobensis Hodkinson & Bird, 2000
16. Livia mediterranea Loginova, 1974
17. Livia mexicana Caldwell, 1944
18. Livia myriosticta Li, 2011
19. Livia obstipa Li, 2011
20. Livia opaqua Caldwell, 1938
21. Livia paludum Walker, 1852
22. Livia rhyssoptera Li, 2011
23. Livia rufipennis (Loginova, 1967)
24. Livia saltatrix Provancher, 1886
25. Livia vernaliforma Caldwell, 1940
26. Livia vernalis Fitch, 1851
