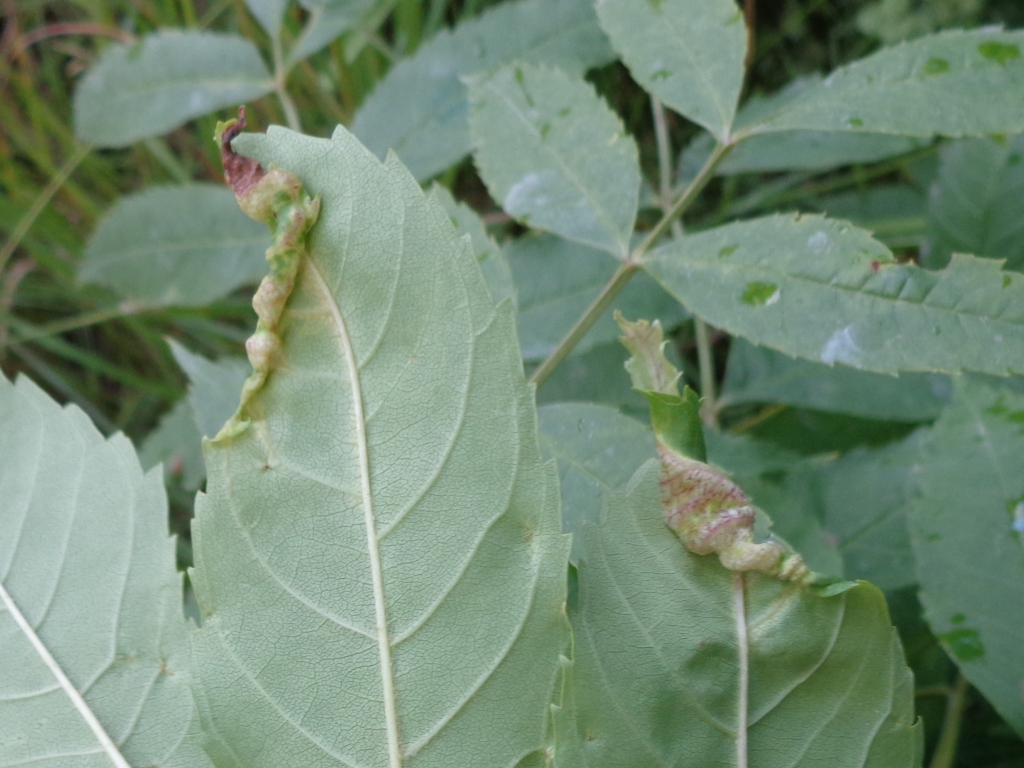

Scientific classification
- Kingdom: Animalia
- Phylum: Arthropoda
- Clade: Pancrustacea
- Class: Insecta
- Order: Hemiptera
- Suborder: Sternorrhyncha
- Family: Liviidae
- Genus: Psyllopsis
- Species: P. fraxini

Binomial name
- Psyllopsis fraxini (Linnaeus, 1758)

= Psyllopsis fraxini =

Species of insect

Psyllopsis fraxini is a psyllid which lives within a gall on ash (Fraxinus excelsior).

Eggs are laid in the autumn on dormant buds and the nymphs hatch in the spring and feed on the leaves. The host plant reacts by producing extra cells and the affected areas become swollen and rolls downwards and encloses the wax covered nymphs. Each gall may contain two or three generations and by the end of summer contain all stages of the insect. The galls are pale-coloured with violet or red markings.
