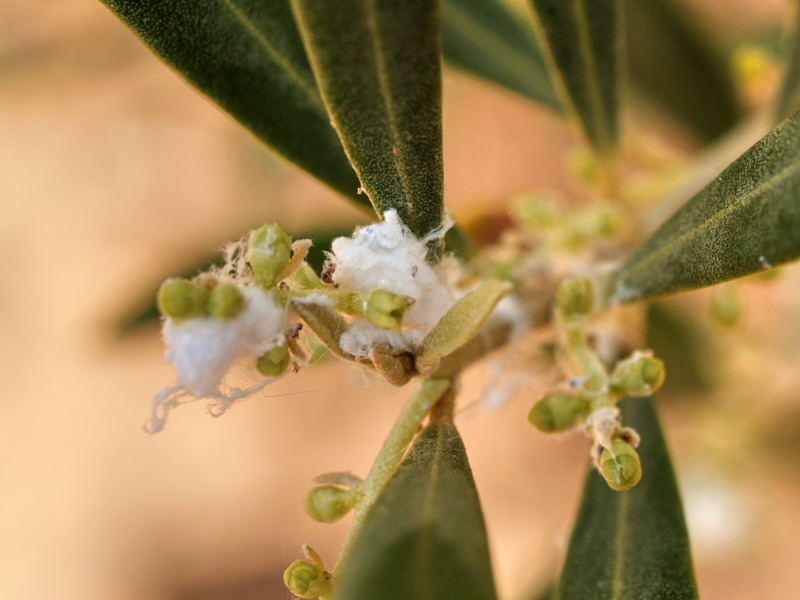
- Euphyllura cf. olivina infesting an olive branch

Scientific classification
- Domain: Eukaryota
- Kingdom: Animalia
- Phylum: Arthropoda
- Class: Insecta
- Order: Hemiptera
- Suborder: Sternorrhyncha
- Family: Liviidae
- Subfamily: Euphyllurinae
- Genus: Euphyllura; Foerster, 1848

Synonyms
- Platystigma

= Euphyllura =

Genus of true bugs

External image
- Images at iNaturalist

Euphyllura is a genus of mostly Palaearctic plant lice belonging to the Liviidae and typical of the subfamily Euphyllurinae; the genus was erected by Arnold Förster in 1848. The distribution of species is mostly in southern Europe and Asia, with records from southern Africa and western USA.

== Species ==
The Global Biodiversity Information Facility lists:

1. Euphyllura aethiopica Silvestri, 1915
2. Euphyllura berberae Li, 2011
3. Euphyllura canariensis Loginova, 1973
4. Euphyllura chimonathea Li, 2011
5. Euphyllura ligustricola Li, 2011
6. Euphyllura longiciliata Silvestri, 1915
7. Euphyllura olivina (Costa, 1839)
8. Euphyllura pakistanica Loginova, 1973
9. Euphyllura phillyreae Foerster, 1848
10. Euphyllura straminea Loginova, 1973
11. Euphyllura tominagai Miyatake, 1981
12. Euphyllura wagnerii Heslop-Harrison, 1951
