= Carsidara =

Scientific classification
- Kingdom: Animalia
- Phylum: Arthropoda
- Class: Insecta
- Order: Hemiptera
- Suborder: Sternorrhyncha
- Family: Carsidaridae
- Subfamily: Carsidarinae
- Genus: Carsidara; Walker, 1869

Synonyms
- Eustigmia; Thysanogyna Crawford, 1919

Genus of true bugs

External image
- Image at iNaturalist

Carsidara is a genus of plant lice typical of the family Carsidaridae and subfamily Carsidarinae; it was originally erected by Francis Walker in 1869. Records (very probably incomplete) include Africa and East Asia.

== Species ==
The Global Biodiversity Information Facility lists:

1. Carsidara africana Hollis, 1987
2. Carsidara camerunensis Tamesse, 2015
3. Carsidara limbata (Enderlein, 1926)
4. Carsidara marginalis Walker, 1869
5. Carsidara shikokuensis (Miyatake, 1981)
