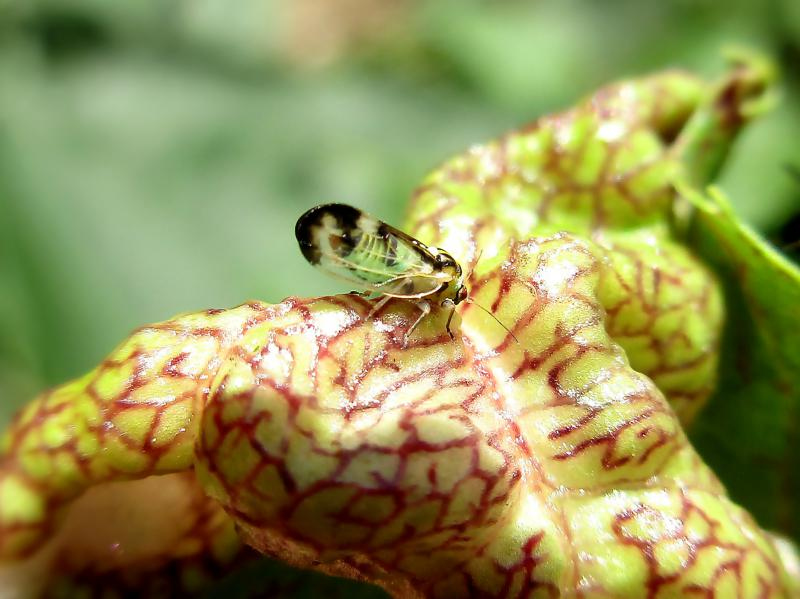
- Psyllopsis fraxini

Scientific classification
- Kingdom: Animalia
- Phylum: Arthropoda
- Class: Insecta
- Order: Hemiptera
- Suborder: Sternorrhyncha
- Family: Liviidae
- Subfamily: Euphyllurinae
- Genus: Psyllopsis; Loew, 1879

Type species
- Psyllopsis fraxinicola (Förster, 1848)

= Psyllopsis =

Genus of true bugs

Psyllopsis is a genus of plant lice, now placed in the subfamily Euphyllurinae.

== Species ==
- Psyllopsis discrepans (Flor, 1861)
- Psyllopsis distinguenda Edwards, 1913
- Psyllopsis dobreanuae Loginova, 1971
- Psyllopsis fraxini (Linnaeus), 1758
- Psyllopsis fraxinicola (Förster, 1848)
- Psyllopsis machinosus Loginova, 1963
- Psyllopsis meliphila Löw, 1881
- Psyllopsis mexicana Crawford, 1914
- Psyllopsis narzykulovi Baeva, 1964
- Psyllopsis proprius Loginova, 1963
- Psyllopsis repens Loginova, 1963
- Psyllopsis securicola Loginova, 1963
