= Camarotoscena speciosa =

Scientific classification
- Domain: Eukaryota
- Kingdom: Animalia
- Phylum: Arthropoda
- Class: Insecta
- Order: Hemiptera
- Suborder: Sternorrhyncha
- Family: Liviidae
- Genus: Camarotoscena
- Species: C. speciosa

Binomial name
- Camarotoscena speciosa (Flor, 1861)

Species of true bug

Camarotoscena speciosa is a species of true bug belonging to the family Liviidae.

It is native to Europe.
