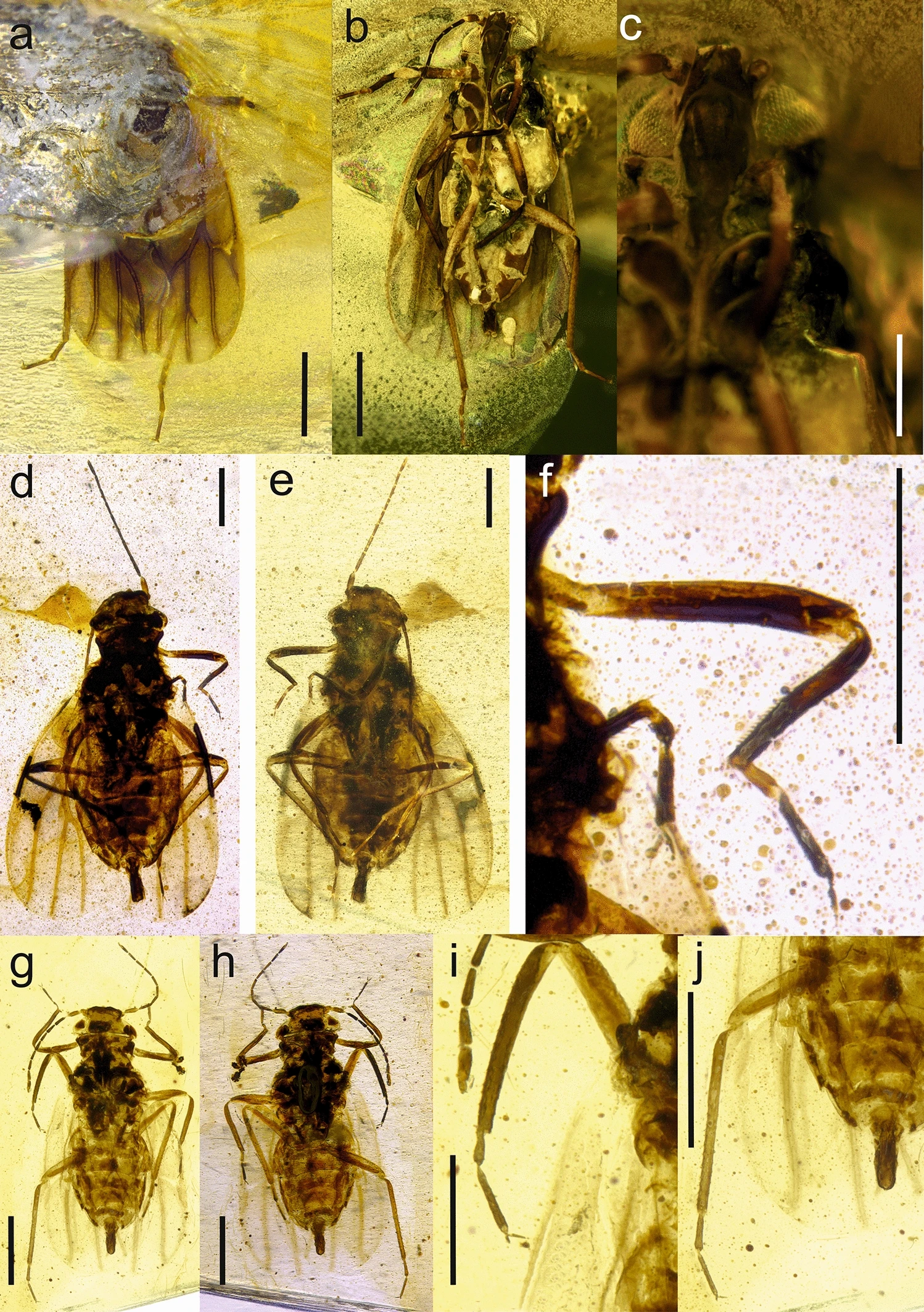
- Paratype male of Dingla shagria

Scientific classification
- Kingdom: Animalia
- Phylum: Arthropoda
- Class: Insecta
- Order: Hemiptera
- Suborder: Sternorrhyncha
- Superfamily: Psylloidea
- Family: †Miralidae (Shcherbakov, 2020)

Genera
- †Alloeopterus; †Dingla; †Mirala; †Pictala

Synonyms
- Dinglidae Szwedo & Drohojowska, 2020

= Miralidae =

Miralidae Temporal range: Cenomanian

Extinct family of insects

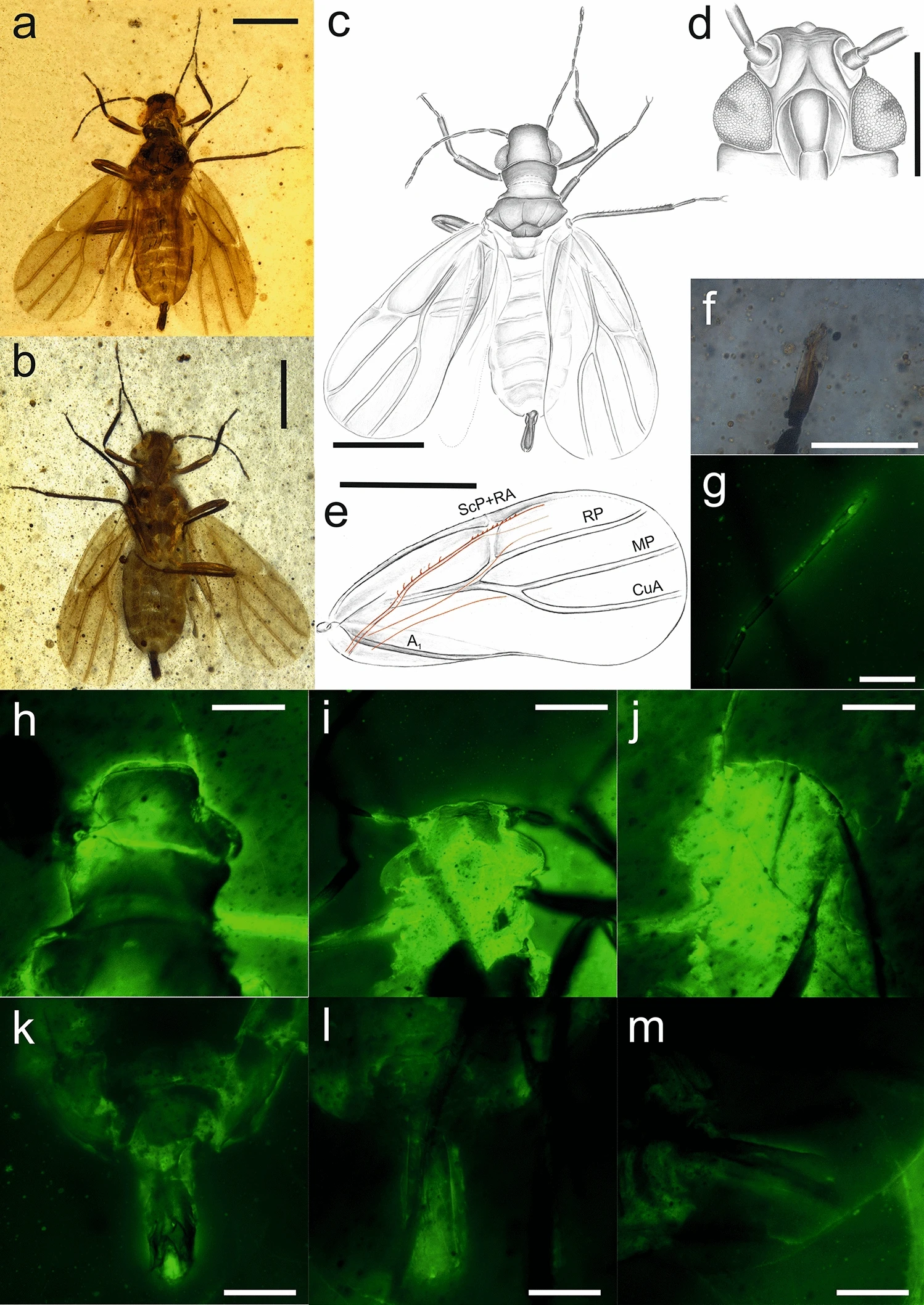
Dingla shagria holotype

Miralidae, formerly known as Miralinae and synonymous with Dinglidae, is an extinct family of hemipteran insects belonging to the suborder Sternorrhyncha. Upon its description as Dinglidae, it was found to not belong to any of the major living sternorrhynchan subgroups, and was thought to be a distinct lineage most closely related to whiteflies until a 2025 paper found it to be within Psylloidea. The family contains four genera, all of which are known from the mid-Cretaceous Burmese amber of Myanmar.
