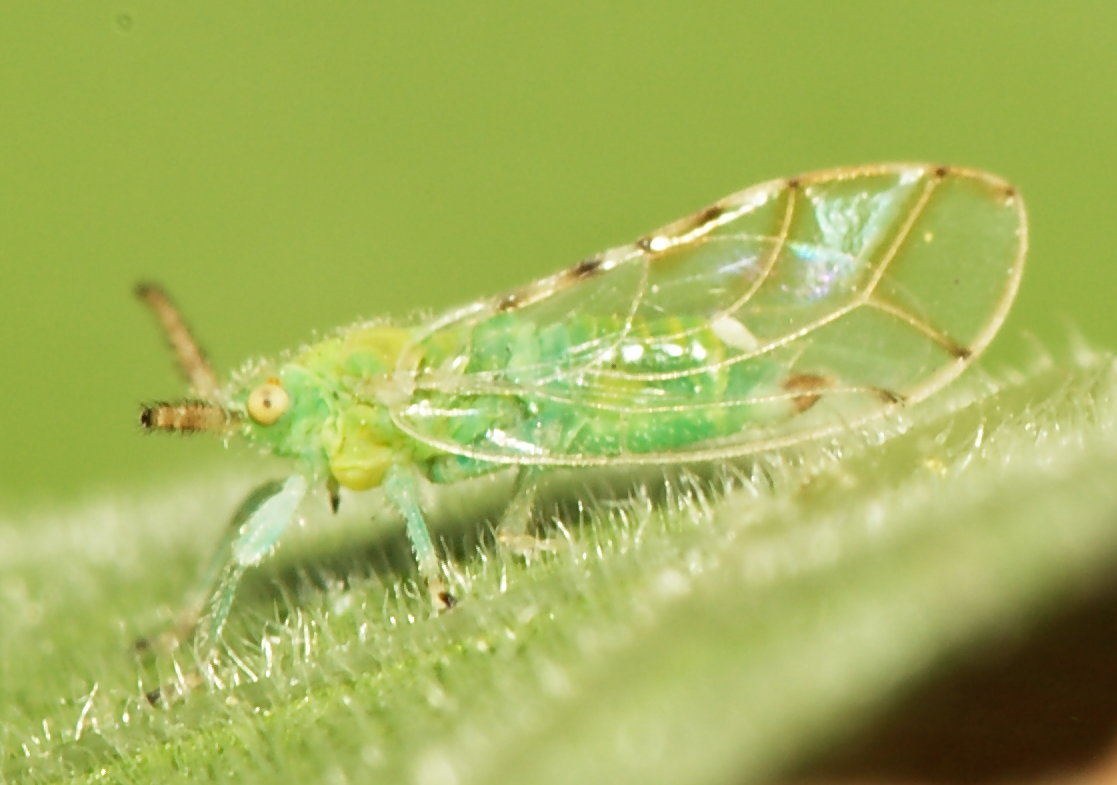
- Homotoma ficus (type species)

Scientific classification
- Kingdom: Animalia
- Phylum: Arthropoda
- Class: Insecta
- Order: Hemiptera
- Suborder: Sternorrhyncha
- Family: Carsidaridae
- Subfamily: Homotominae
- Genus: Homotoma; Guérin-Méneville, 1844

Synonyms
- Anisostropha; Austrohomotoma; Caenohomotoma; Harrisonella; Heterohomotoma; Labobrachia; Metapsausia; Psausia

= Homotoma =

Genus of insects

Homotoma is a genus of mostly Palaearctic plant lice in the family Carsidaridae and typical of the subfamily Homotominae; it was erected by Félix Guérin-Méneville in 1844.

== Species ==
The following are recognised:

- Homotoma altissimae (Yang & Li, 1984)
- Homotoma angolensis Hollis & Broomfield, 1989
- Homotoma annesleae (Yang & Li, 1984)
- Homotoma bakeri Crawford, 1915
- Homotoma bambusae (Yang & Li, 1981)
- Homotoma bamendae Hollis & Broomfield, 1989
- Homotoma benjaminae (Yang & Li, 1984)
- Homotoma bilineata Crawford, 1917
- Homotoma boheae Yu, 1956
- Homotoma brevis (Li, 1993)
- Homotoma caroliquarti Burckhardt & Lauterer, 1993
- Homotoma chlamydodora Hollis & Broomfield, 1989
- Homotoma chuanana (Yang & Li, 1981)
- Homotoma distincta Crawford, 1912
- Homotoma eastopi Hollis & Broomfield, 1989
- Homotoma ficus (Linnaeus, 1758)
- Homotoma galbvittata (Yang & Li, 1984)
- Homotoma gressitti Miyatake, 1974
- Homotoma indica (Mathur, 1975)
- Homotoma lahui (Yang & Li, 1984)
- Homotoma maculata (Yang, 1984)
- Homotoma mangiferae (Yang & Li, 1984)
- Homotoma microphyllae (Li & Yang, 1991)
- Homotoma pacifica Crawford, 1915
- Homotoma pyriformiscola (Yang & Li, 1984)
- Homotoma radiata Kuwayama, 1908
- Homotoma ruiliana (Yang & Li, 1984)
- Homotoma shuana (Yang & Li, 1981)
- Homotoma spiraea (Yang & Li, 1981)
- Homotoma unifasciata Yu, 1956
- Homotoma wulinensis (Yang, 1984)
- Homotoma xishuangana (Yang & Li, 1984)
- Homotoma yunnanica (Yang & Li, 1984)
