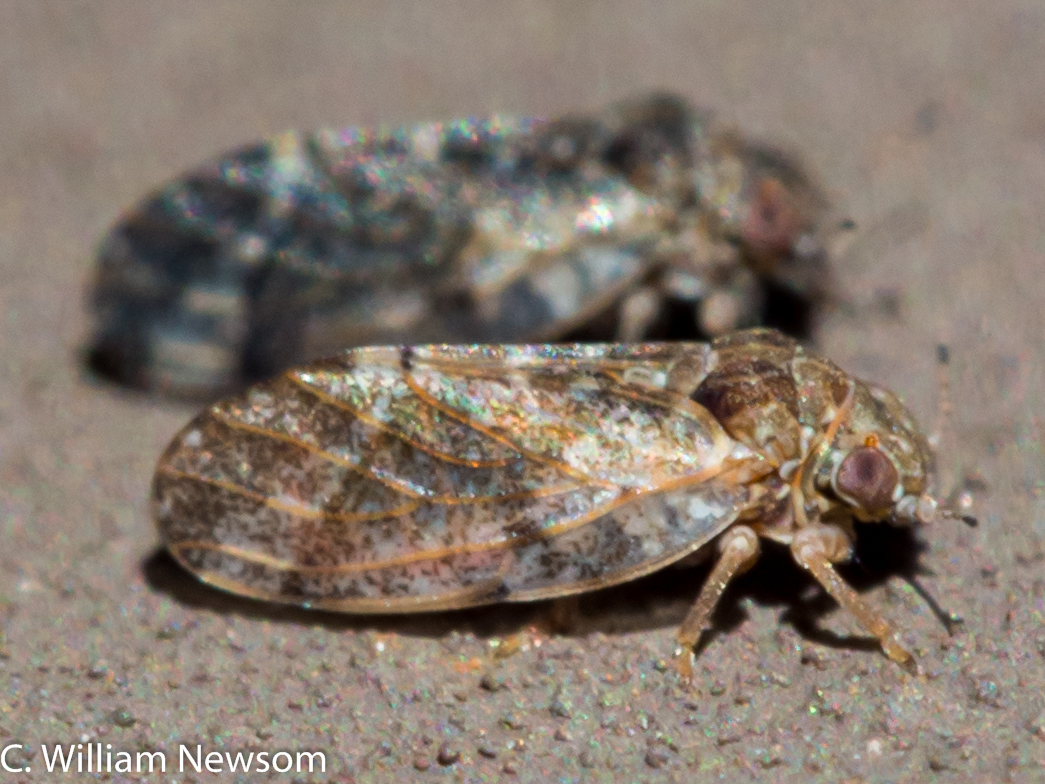
- Hackberry nipplegall

Scientific classification
- Domain: Eukaryota
- Kingdom: Animalia
- Phylum: Arthropoda
- Class: Insecta
- Order: Hemiptera
- Suborder: Sternorrhyncha
- Family: Carsidaridae
- Subfamily: Pachypsyllinae
- Genus: Pachypsylla; Riley, 1885

= Pachypsylla =

Genus of true bugs

Pachypsylla is a genus of North American psyllids. Species of the genus Pachypsylla lay eggs on the leaves of the Celtis occidentalis tree. Upon hatching, the young psyllids become encased in a gall which the young leaf parts grow in response to the infestation.

== Species ==
The following species are recognised in the genus Pachypsylla:

- Pachypsylla celtidisasterisca Riley, 1890
- Pachypsylla celtidiscucurbita Riley, 1890
- Pachypsylla celtidisgemma Riley, 1885 – hackberry bud gall maker
- Pachypsylla celtidisglobula Riley, 1890
- Pachypsylla celtidisinteneris Mally, 1894
- Pachypsylla celtidismamma (Riley, 1881) – hackberry nipplegall maker
- Pachypsylla celtidispubescens Riley, 1890
- Pachypsylla celtidisumbilicus Riley, 1890
- Pachypsylla celtidisvesicula Riley, 1890 – hackberry blistergall psyllid
- Pachypsylla cohabitans Yang & Riemann, 2001
- Pachypsylla dubia Patch, 1912
- Pachypsylla pallida Patch, 1912
- Pachypsylla tropicala Caldwell, 1944
- Pachypsylla venusta (Osten-Sacken, 1861) – petiolegall psyllid

== Gallery ==
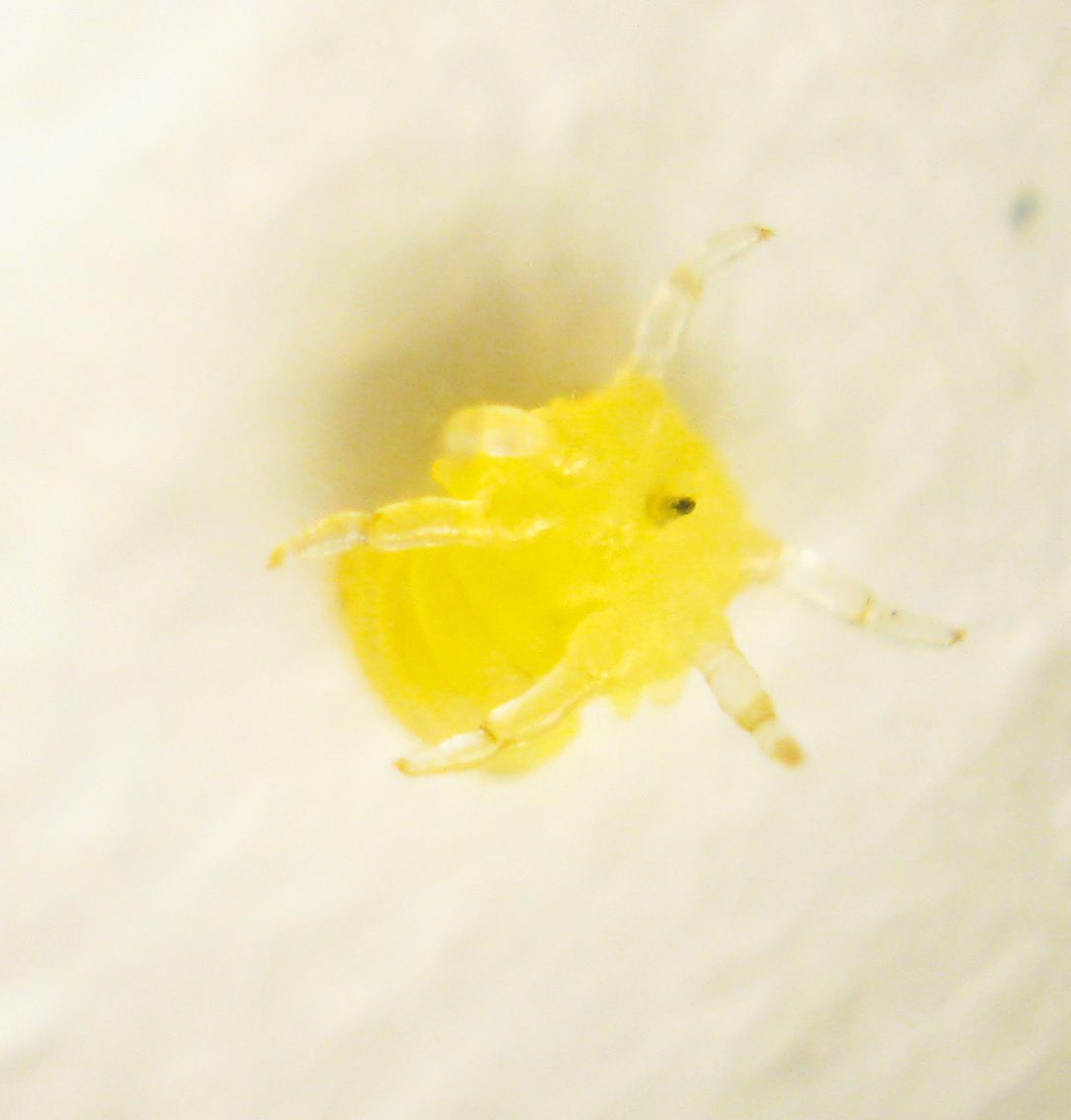
Pachypsylla celtidisumbilicus, nymph

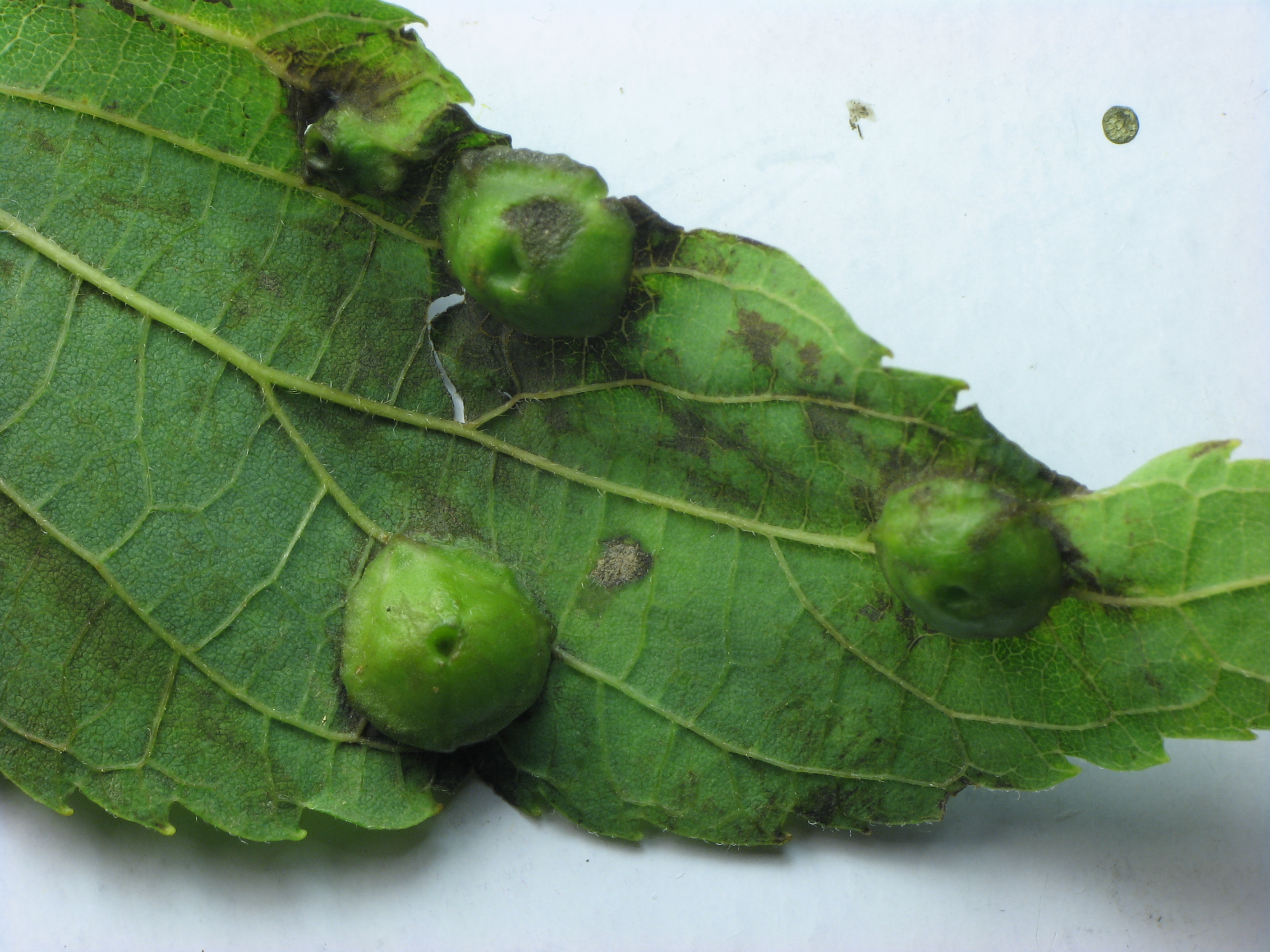
Galls of Pachypsylla celtidisumbilicus

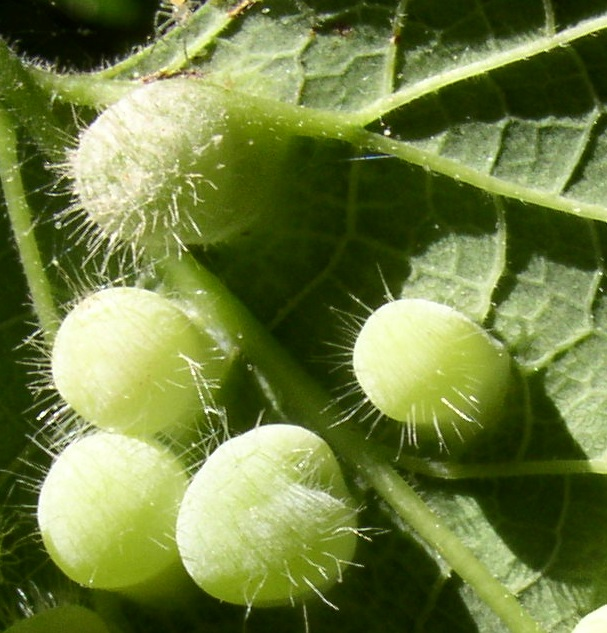
Galls of Pachypsylla celtidismamma on hackberry

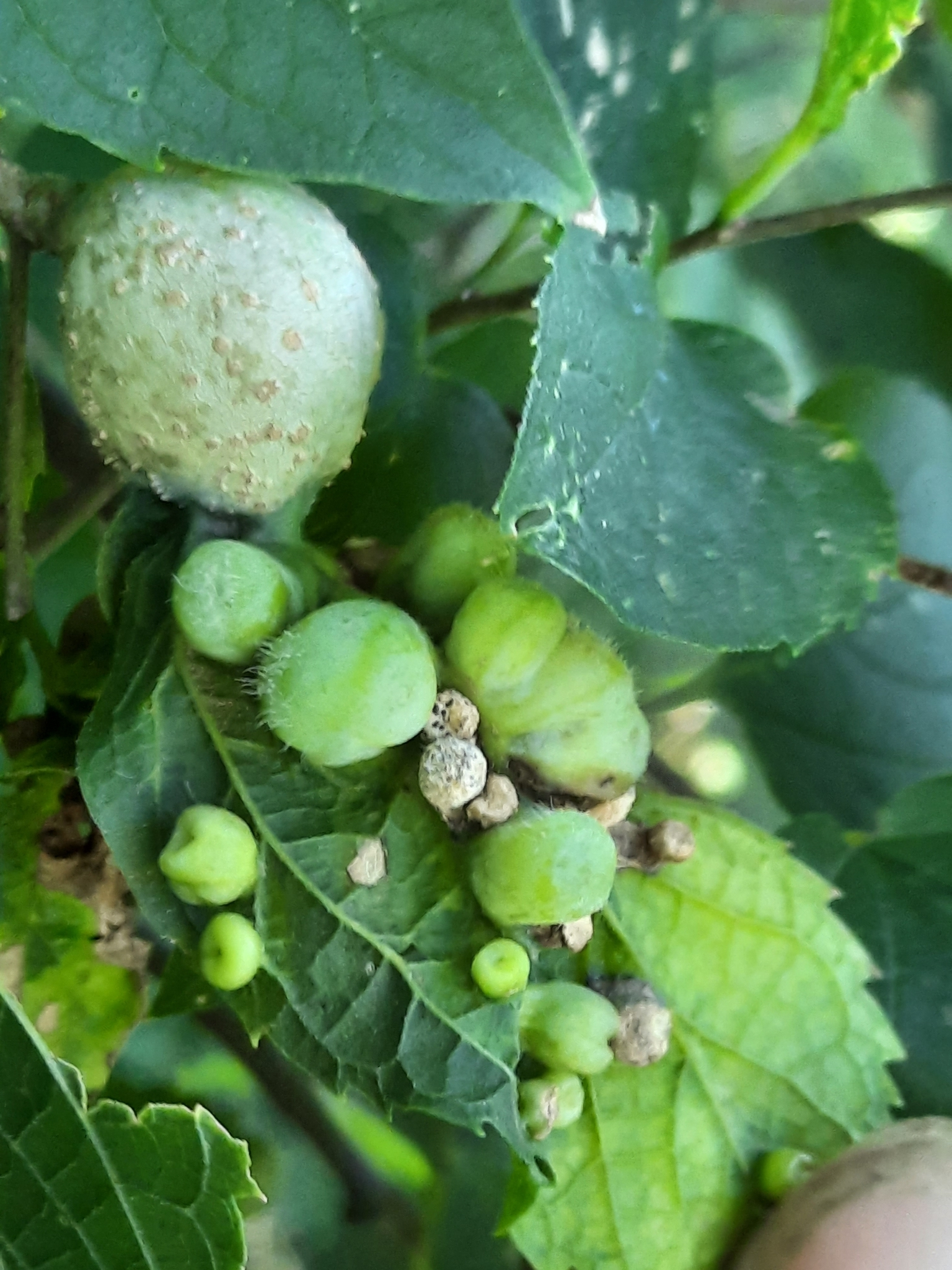
Galls of Pachypsylla venusta
