= Camarotoscena =

Scientific classification
- Domain: Eukaryota
- Kingdom: Animalia
- Phylum: Arthropoda
- Class: Insecta
- Order: Hemiptera
- Suborder: Sternorrhyncha
- Family: Liviidae
- Subfamily: Liviinae
- Genus: Camarotoscena; Haupt, 1935

Genus of true bugs

Camarotoscena is a genus of true bugs belonging to the family Liviidae.

The genus was first described by Haupt in 1935 and species in this genus are found in the Palaearctic realm.

== Species ==
The Global Biodiversity Information Facility lists:

1. Camarotoscena anglica (Cockerell, 1915)
2. Camarotoscena badia Loginova, 1965
3. Camarotoscena bianchii Loginova, 1975
4. Camarotoscena fulgidipennis Loginova, 1975
5. Camarotoscena hoberlandti Vondráček, 1952
6. Camarotoscena lauta Loginova, 1975
7. Camarotoscena libera Loginova, 1975
8. Camarotoscena pamirica Baeva, 1983
9. Camarotoscena personata Loginova, 1975
10. Camarotoscena speciosa (Flor, 1861)
11. Camarotoscena subrubescens (Flor, 1861)
12. Camarotoscena trjapitzini Loginova, 1968
13. Camarotoscena wulingshanica Li, 2011
14. Camarotoscena wutaishanica Li, 2011
15. Camarotoscena xinjiangica Li, 2011
