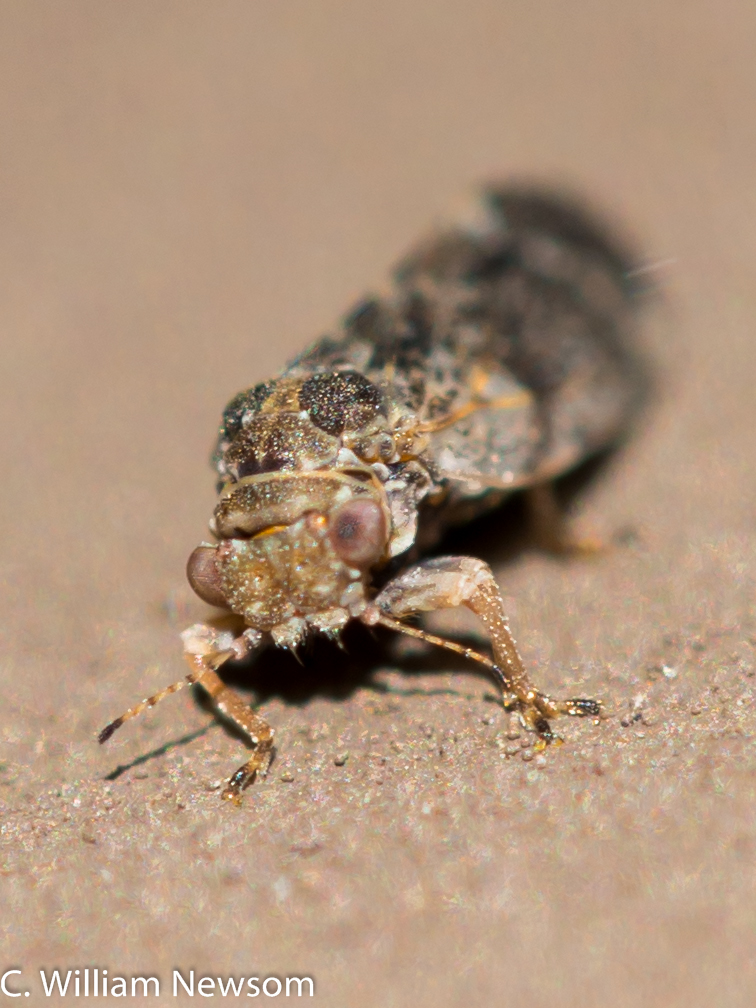

Scientific classification
- Domain: Eukaryota
- Kingdom: Animalia
- Phylum: Arthropoda
- Class: Insecta
- Order: Hemiptera
- Suborder: Sternorrhyncha
- Family: Carsidaridae
- Genus: Pachypsylla
- Species: P. celtidismamma

Binomial name
- Pachypsylla celtidismamma (Fletcher, 1883)

= Pachypsylla celtidismamma =

Species of true bug

Pachypsylla celtidismamma, known generally as the hackberry nipplegall maker or hackberry psylla, is a species of plant-parasitic hemipteran in the family Aphalaridae.

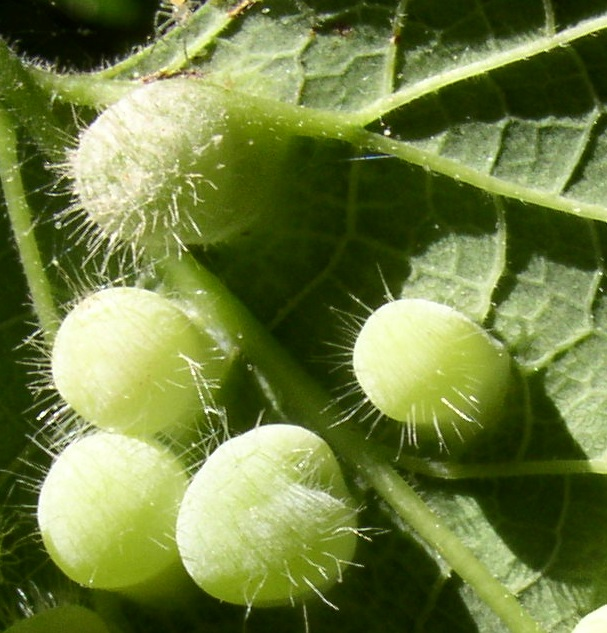
Galls on hackberry

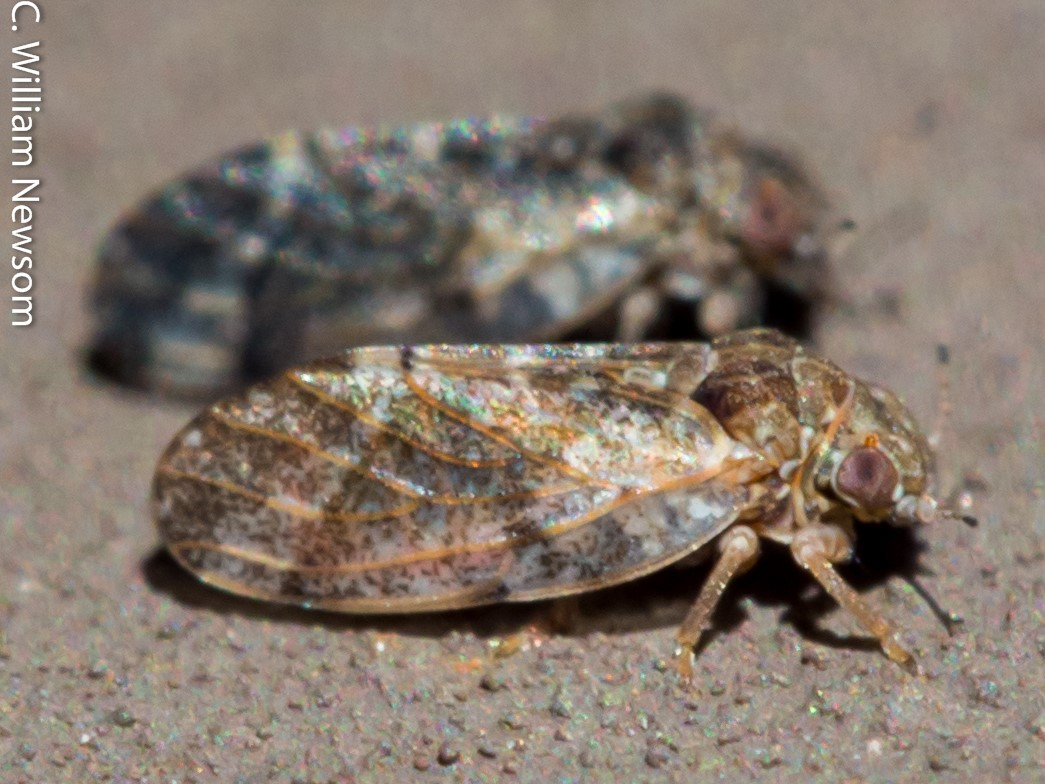
Hackberry nipplegall maker, Pachypsylla celtidismamma

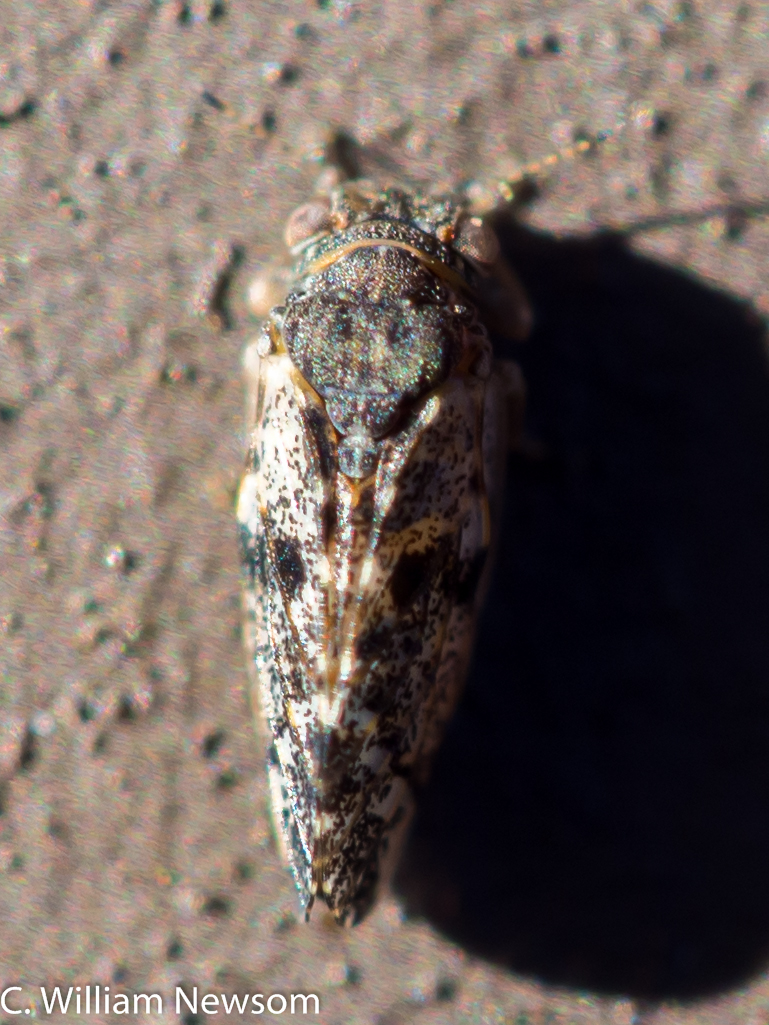
Hackberry nipplegall maker, Pachypsylla celtidismamma
