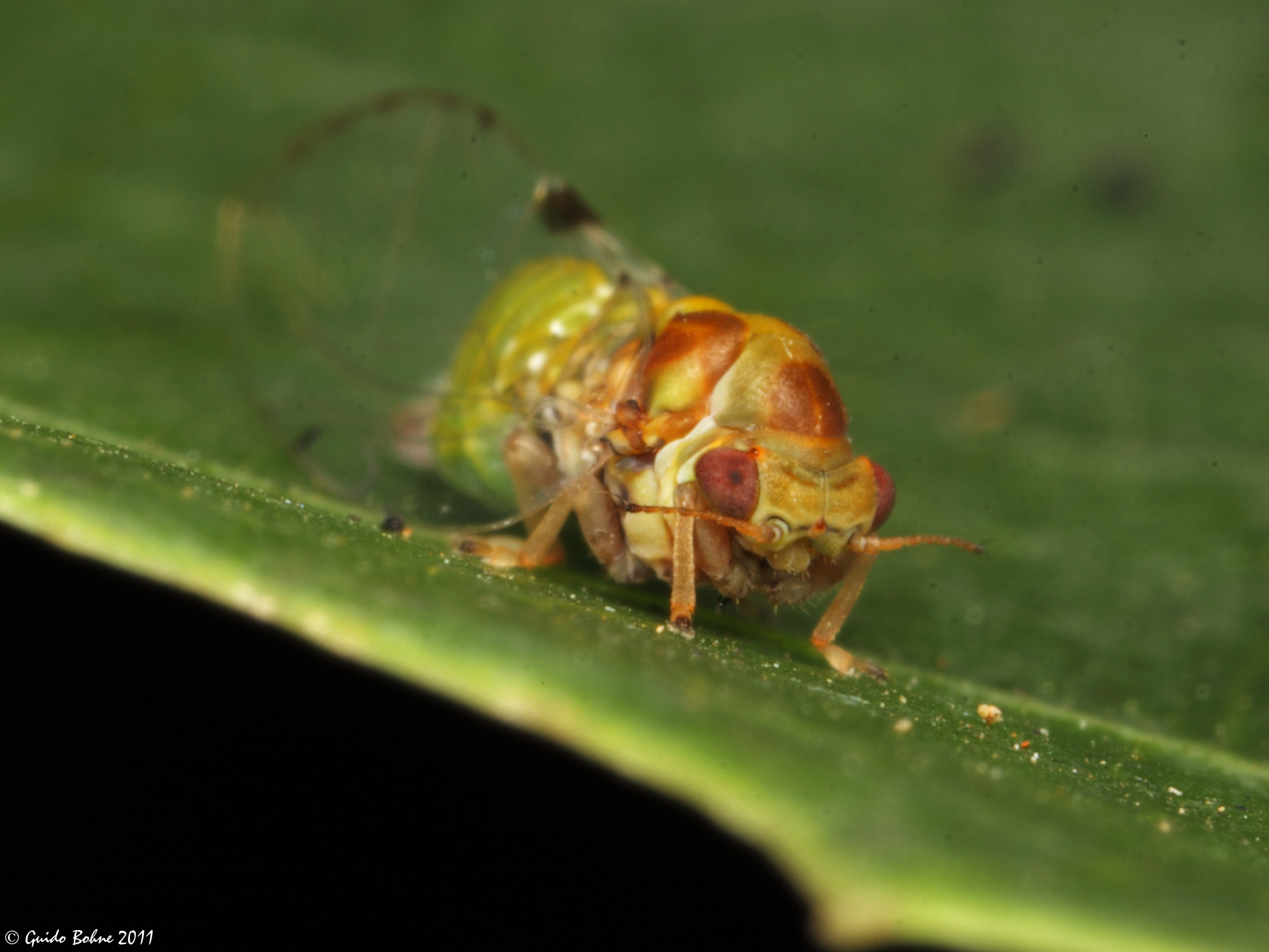

Scientific classification
- Domain: Eukaryota
- Kingdom: Animalia
- Phylum: Arthropoda
- Class: Insecta
- Order: Hemiptera
- Suborder: Sternorrhyncha
- Family: Carsidaridae
- Subfamily: Homotominae
- Genus: Macrohomotoma; Kuwayama, 1908

= Macrohomotoma =

Genus of true bugs

Macrohomotoma is a genus of plant-parasitic hemipterans in the subfamily Homotominae and tribe Macrohomotomini. There are about 15 described species in Macrohomotoma.

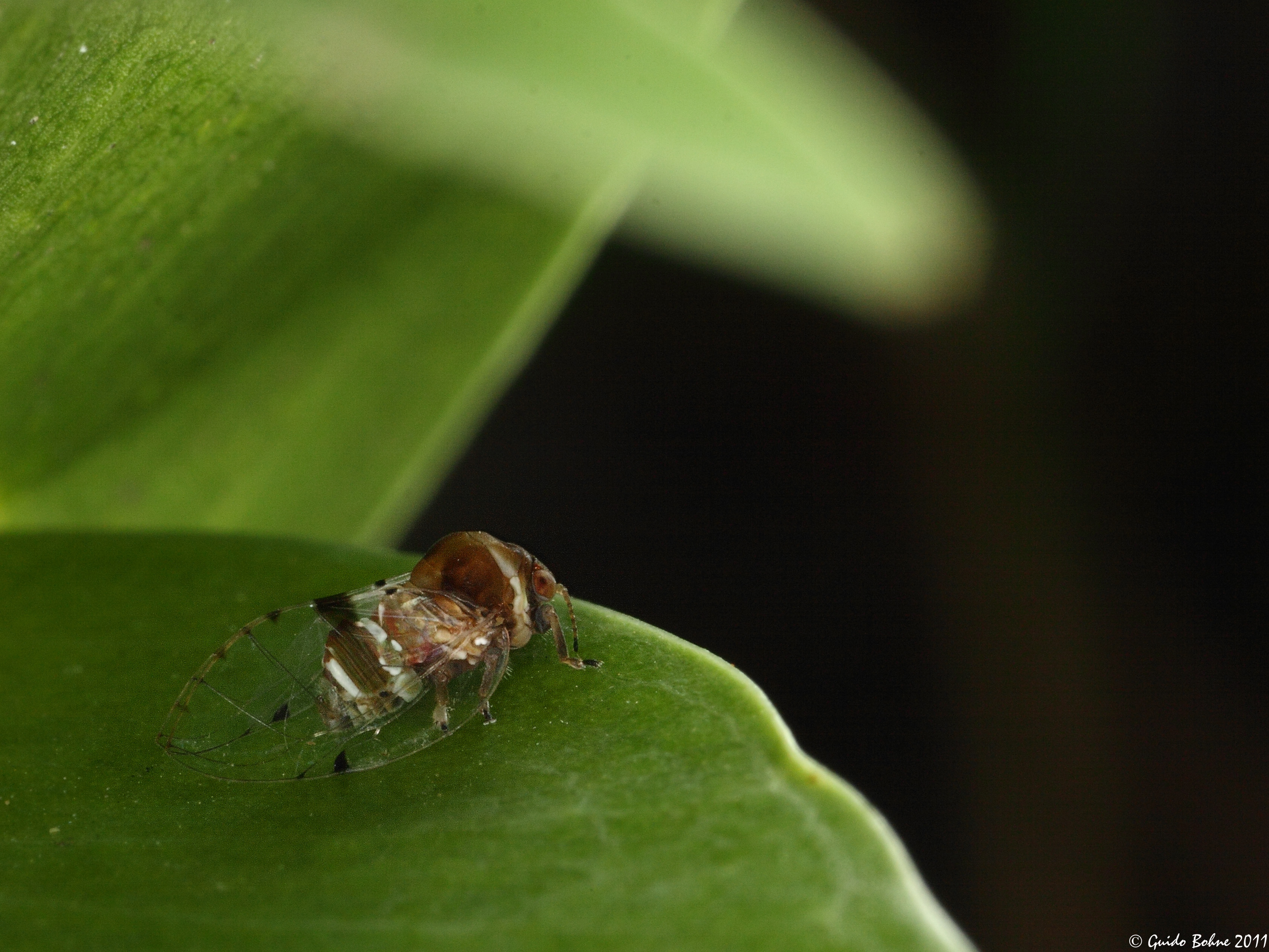

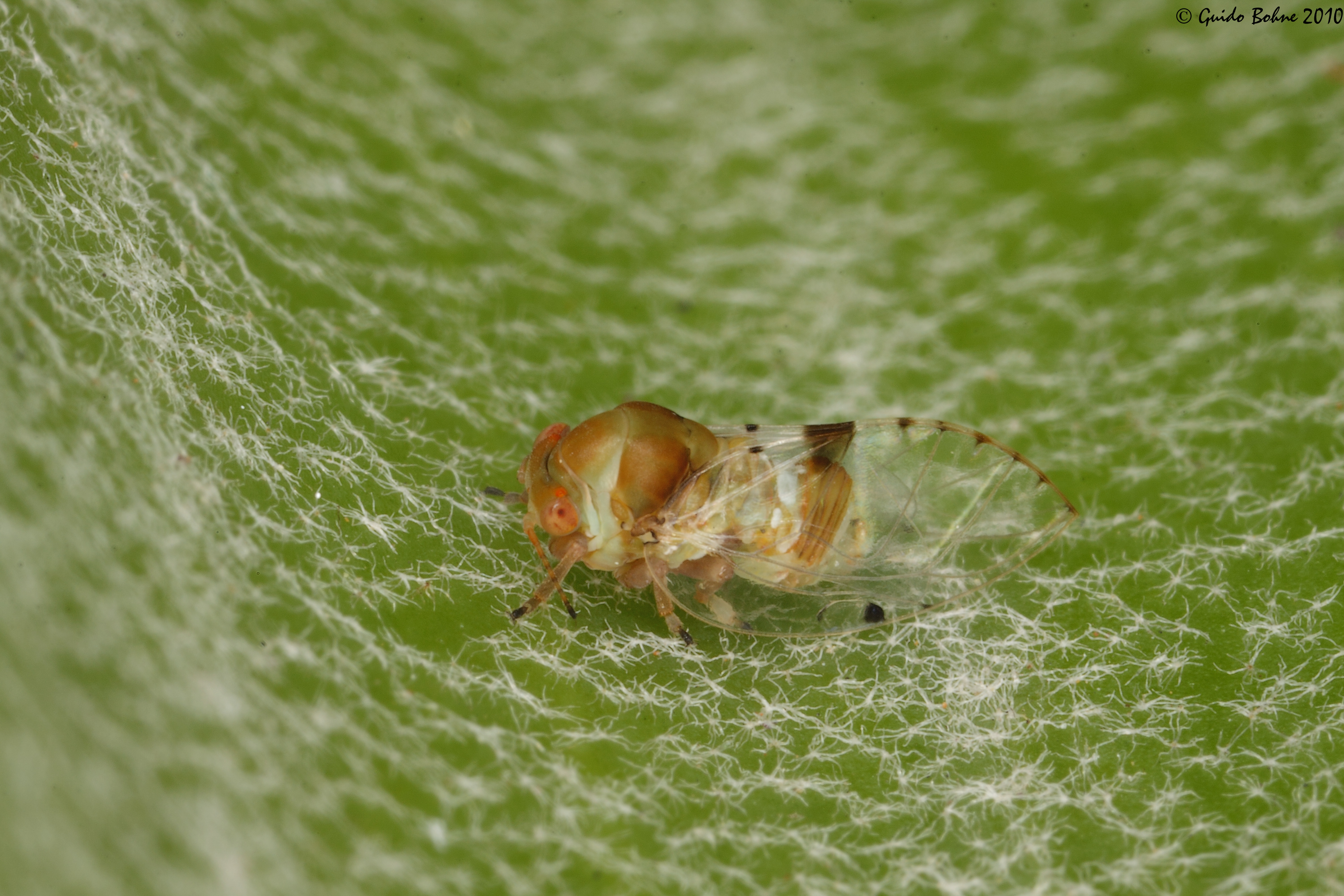

== Species ==
These 15 species belong to the genus Macrohomotoma:

- Macrohomotoma apsylloides (Crawford, 1919)^{c g}
- Macrohomotoma geniculata Mathur, 1975^{c g}
- Macrohomotoma gladiata Kuwayama, 1908^{c g b} (curtain fig psyllid)
- Macrohomotoma guangxiense Li, 2011^{c g}
- Macrohomotoma hylocola Yang & Li, 1984^{c g}
- Macrohomotoma maculata Mathur, 1975^{c g}
- Macrohomotoma magna Yang & Li, 1984^{c g}
- Macrohomotoma minana Yang & Li, 1984^{c g}
- Macrohomotoma robusta Yang, 1984^{c g}
- Macrohomotoma sandakana Crawford, 1925^{c g}
- Macrohomotoma striata Crawford, 1925^{c g}
- Macrohomotoma suijiangiense Li, 2011^{c g}
- Macrohomotoma viridis Yang & Li, 1984^{c g}
- Macrohomotoma williamsi Crawford, 1925^{c g}
- Macrohomotoma yunana Yang & Li, 1984^{c g}

Data sources: i = ITIS, c = Catalogue of Life, g = GBIF, b = Bugguide.net
