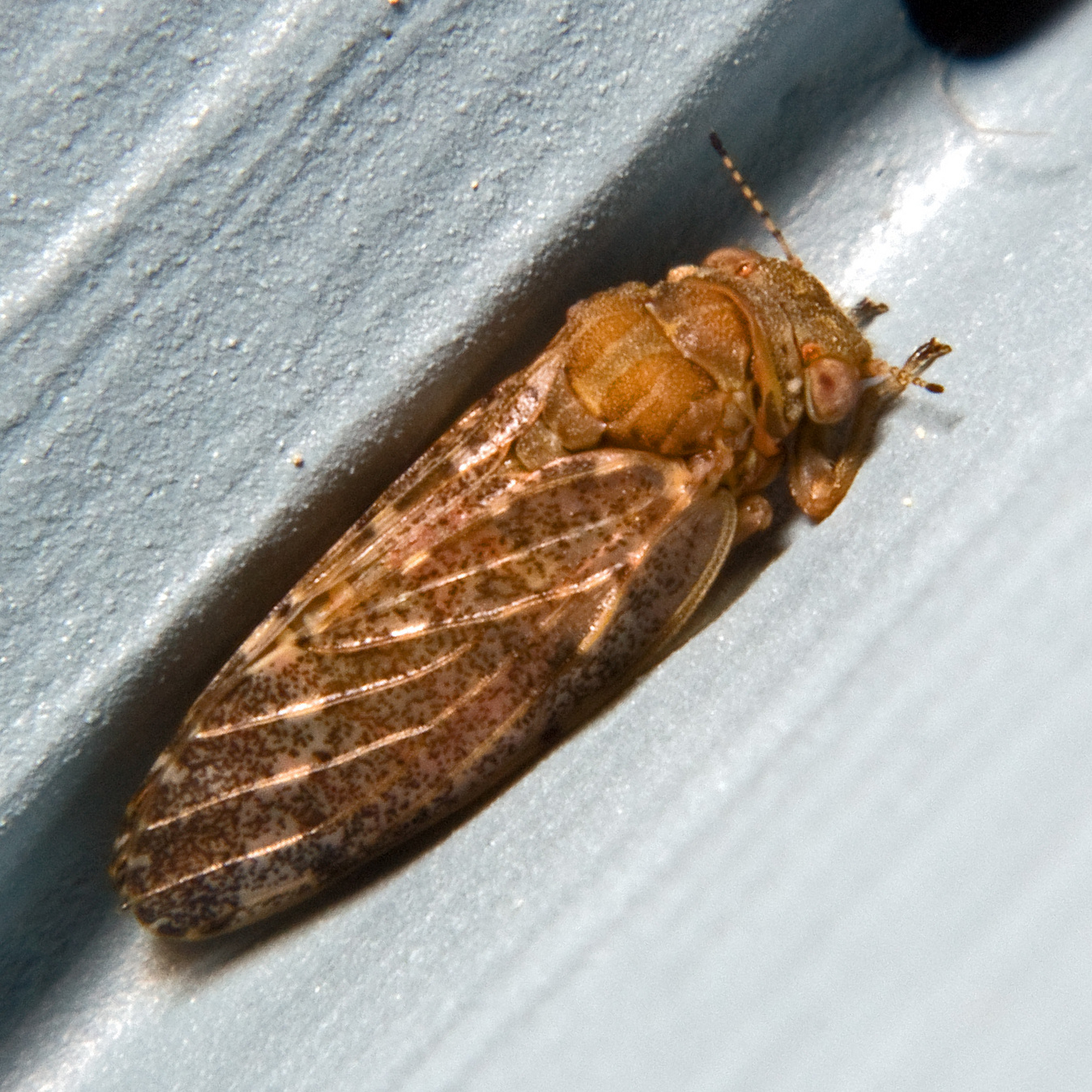
- Hackberry psyllid – Pachypsylla sp.

Scientific classification
- Domain: Eukaryota
- Kingdom: Animalia
- Phylum: Arthropoda
- Class: Insecta
- Order: Hemiptera
- Suborder: Sternorrhyncha
- Superfamily: Psylloidea
- Family: Carsidaridae; Crawford, 1911

= Carsidaridae =

Family of true bugs

External image
- Images at iNaturalist

Carsidaridae is a bug family in the superfamily Psylloidea, with a world-wide (more southern hemisphere) distribution; the type genus Carsidara is from eastern Asia. Species of Allocarsidara are considered to be durian pests.

== Genera ==
A recent (2021) review identified three subfamilies:

=== Carsidarinae ===
Authority: Crawford, 1911

1. Allocarsidara Hollis, 1987
2. Carsidara Walker, 1869
3. Epicarsa Crawford, 1911
4. Mesohomotoma Kuwayama, 1908 (syn. Udamostigma)
5. Paracarsidara Heslop-Harrison, 1960
6. Protyora Kieffer, 1906 (syn. Neocarsidara)
7. Tenaphalara Kuwayama, 1908
8. Tyora Walker, 1869 (syn. Carsidaroida, Nesiope)

=== Homotominae ===
Authority: Heslop-Harrison, 1958 (previously Homotomidae)

tribe Dynopsyllini Bekker-Migdisova, 1973

1. Diceraopsylla Crawford, 1912
2. Afrodynopsylla Hollis & Broomfield, 1989
3. Austrodynopsylla Hollis & Broomfield, 1989
4. Dynopsylla Crawford, 1913 (syn. Crawfordella, Sphingocladia)
5. Triozamia Vondráček, 1963

tribe Homotomini Heslop-Harrison, 1958

1. Homotoma Guérin-Méneville, 1844
2. Synoza Enderlein, 1918

tribe Macrohomotomini White & Hodkinson, 1985

1. Mycopsylla Froggatt, 1901 (syn. Edenus)
2. Macrohomotoma Kuwayama, 1908
3. Pseudoeriopsylla Newstead, 1911
4. Moriphila Burckhardt & Cho in Burckhardt et al., 2018
5. Phytolyma Scott, 1882

=== Pachypsyllinae ===
Authority: Crawford, 1914

1. Celtisaspis Yang & Li, 1982
2. Pachypsylla Riley, 1885 (syn. Blastophysa)
3. Tetragonocephala Crawford, 1914
