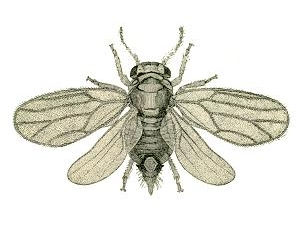
- Diclidophlebia sterculiae

Scientific classification
- Domain: Eukaryota
- Kingdom: Animalia
- Phylum: Arthropoda
- Class: Insecta
- Order: Hemiptera
- Suborder: Sternorrhyncha
- Superfamily: Psylloidea
- Family: Liviidae; Loew, 1879

= Liviidae =

Family of true bugs

Liviidae is a family of plant lice (order Hemiptera), with about 19 genera.

== Subfamilies and genera ==
There have been various classifications of Psylloidea including that of Burckhardt and Ouvrard (2012); in the latest (2021) review, three monophyletic subfamilies were identified:

=== Euphyllurinae ===
Authority: Burckhardt D, Ouvrard D, Percy DM (2021)

1. Brachyphyllura Li, 2011
2. Crytophyllura Li, 2011
3. Eremopsylloides Loginova, 1964
4. Euphyllura Foerster, 1848 (syn. Platystigma)
5. Ligustrinia Loginova, 1973
6. Megadicrania Loginova, 1976
7. Pachypsylloides de Bergevin, 1927
8. Peripsyllopsis Enderlein, 1926
9. Psyllopsis Löw, 1879
10. Strophingia Enderlein, 1914
11. Shaerqia Kemal & Koçak, 2009 (syn. Acaerus, Sureaca)
12. Syringilla Loginova, 1967

=== Liviinae ===
Authority: Löw, 1879; synonyms: Paurocephalini Vondráček, 1963, Diclidophlebiini Bekker-Migdisova, 1973, Camarotosceninae Li, 2011, Liviini Löw, 1879, Sinuonemopsyllinae Li, 2011

1. Aphorma Hodkinson, 1974 (synonym Leprostictopsylla)
2. Camarotoscena Haupt, 1935
3. Diclidophlebia Crawford, 1920 (synonyms include Haplaphalara)
4. Livia Latreille, 1802 (synonyms Diraphia, Diraphia, Vailakiella)
5. Paurocephala Crawford, 1913 (synonyms include Thoracocorna)
6. Syntomoza Enderlein, 1921 (synonyms Anomoterga, Homalocephala)

Neophyllurinae (monotypic subfamily)

1. Neophyllura Loginova, 1973

Note: in the same review, a number of genera were transferred to Psyllidae, including the subfamilies Ciriacreminae (3 genera), Diaphorininae (2 genera), Katacephalinae subfam. nov. (4 genera) and the genus Cornopsylla to the Psyllinae.
