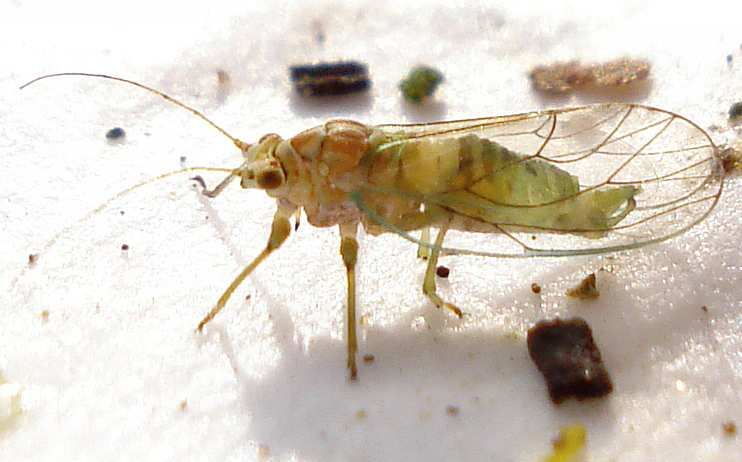
- Psylla alni

Scientific classification
- Kingdom: Animalia
- Phylum: Arthropoda
- Clade: Pancrustacea
- Class: Insecta
- Order: Hemiptera
- Suborder: Sternorrhyncha
- Superfamily: Psylloidea; Latreille, 1807

Families
- See text

= Psylloidea =

Psylloidea Temporal range: Early Jurassic–Recent

Superfamily of true bugs

Psylloidea is a superfamily of true bugs, including the jumping plant lice and others which have recently been classified as distinct families. Though the group first appeared during the Early Jurassic, modern members of the group do not appear until the Eocene, and Mesozoic members of the order are usually assigned to the possibly paraphyletic family Liadopsyllidae.

== Families ==
The following extant families are included:

1. Aphalaridae (includes Phacopteronidae, now a subfamily)
2. Calophyidae
3. Carsidaridae (includes Homotominae)
4. Liviidae
5. Mastigimatidae Bekker-Migdisova, 1973
6. Psyllidae
7. Triozidae

In addition, the following extinct families are recognised:

- †Liadopsyllidae
- †Malmopsyllidae
- †Miralidae
- †Neopsylloididae

== Economic importance ==
Some psylloids are economically important pests:

- Diaphorina citri (Liviidae), the asiatic citrus psyllid is native to southern Asia; it has spread to most citrus-growing regions. It is a vector of Liberobacter asiaticum, the bacterial greening disease.
- Trioza erytreae (Triozidae), the African citrus psyllid is a pest of citrus and some other Rutaceae. Like Diaphorina citri it is a vector of "greening disease". The psyllid is primarily an Afrotropical pest.
- Trioza perseae (Triozidae), the avocado psyllid forms galls on the leaves of avocado, Persea americana. Other psyllid pests of avocado include Trioza anceps, Trioza aguacate and Trioza godoyae
- Trioza apicalis (Triozidae), the carrot psyllid is an important pest of the cultivated carrot, Daucus carota (Apiaceae).
- Bactericera cockerelli (syn. Paratrioza cockerelli) (Triozidae), the potato psyllid feeds on potatoes and tomatoes (Solanaceae); sporadic infestations have occurred in potato-growing areas of the USA, causing symptoms knows as "potato yellows".

== Gallery ==
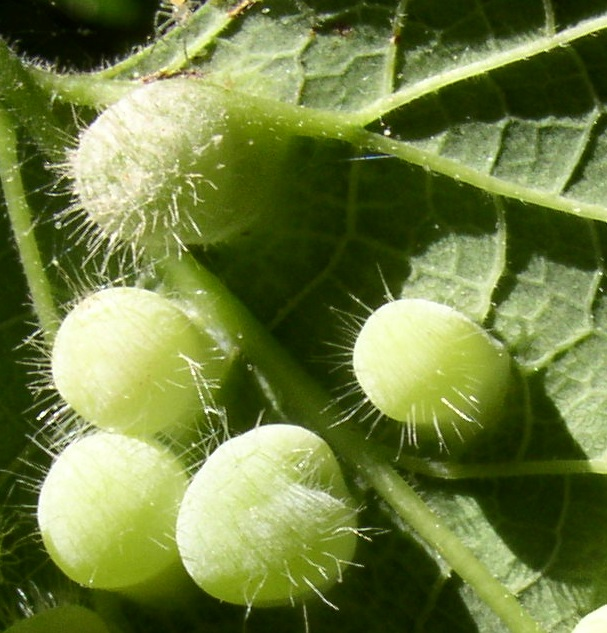
Pachypsylla celtidismamma, galls

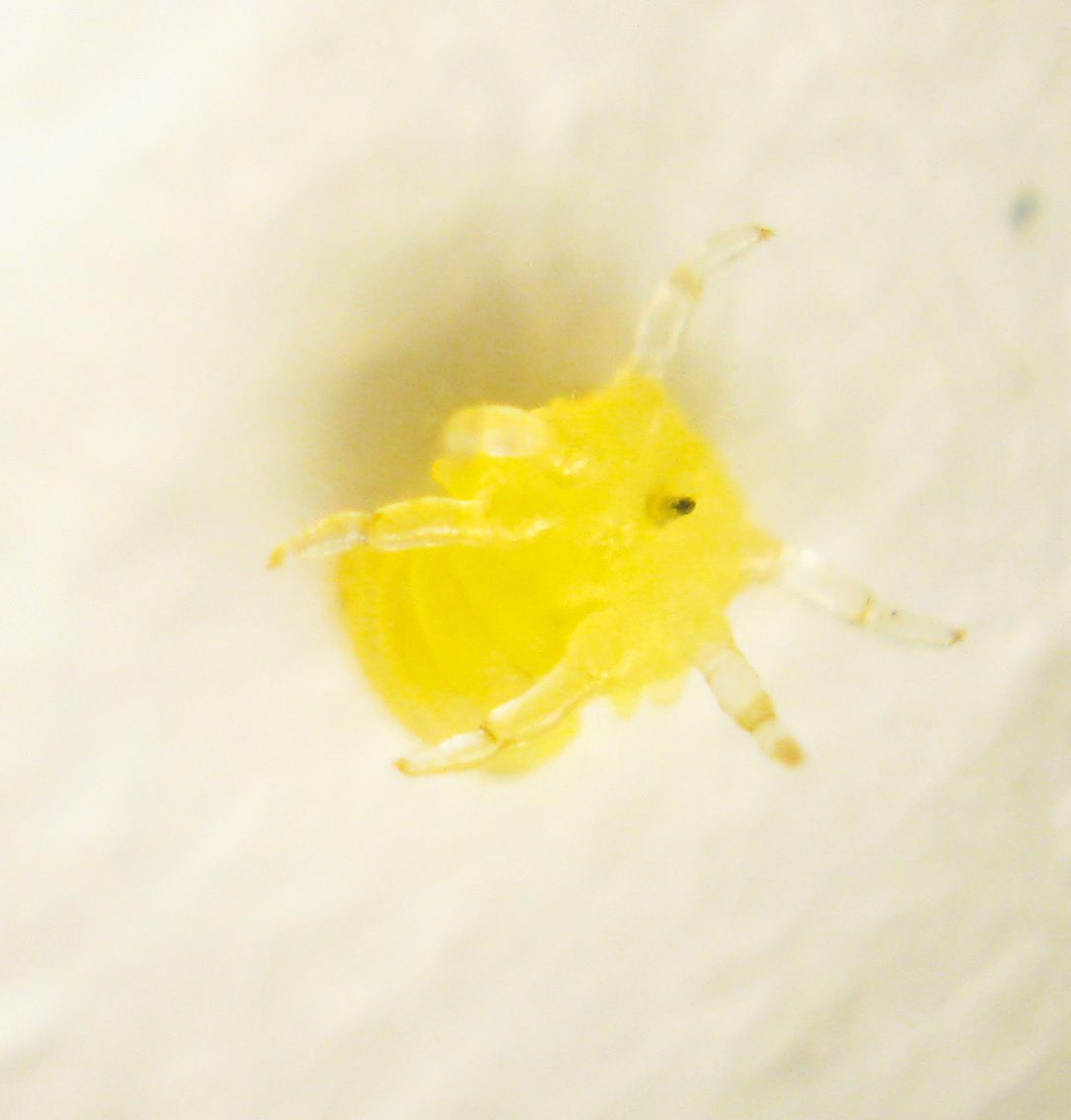
Pachypsylla celtidisumbilicus

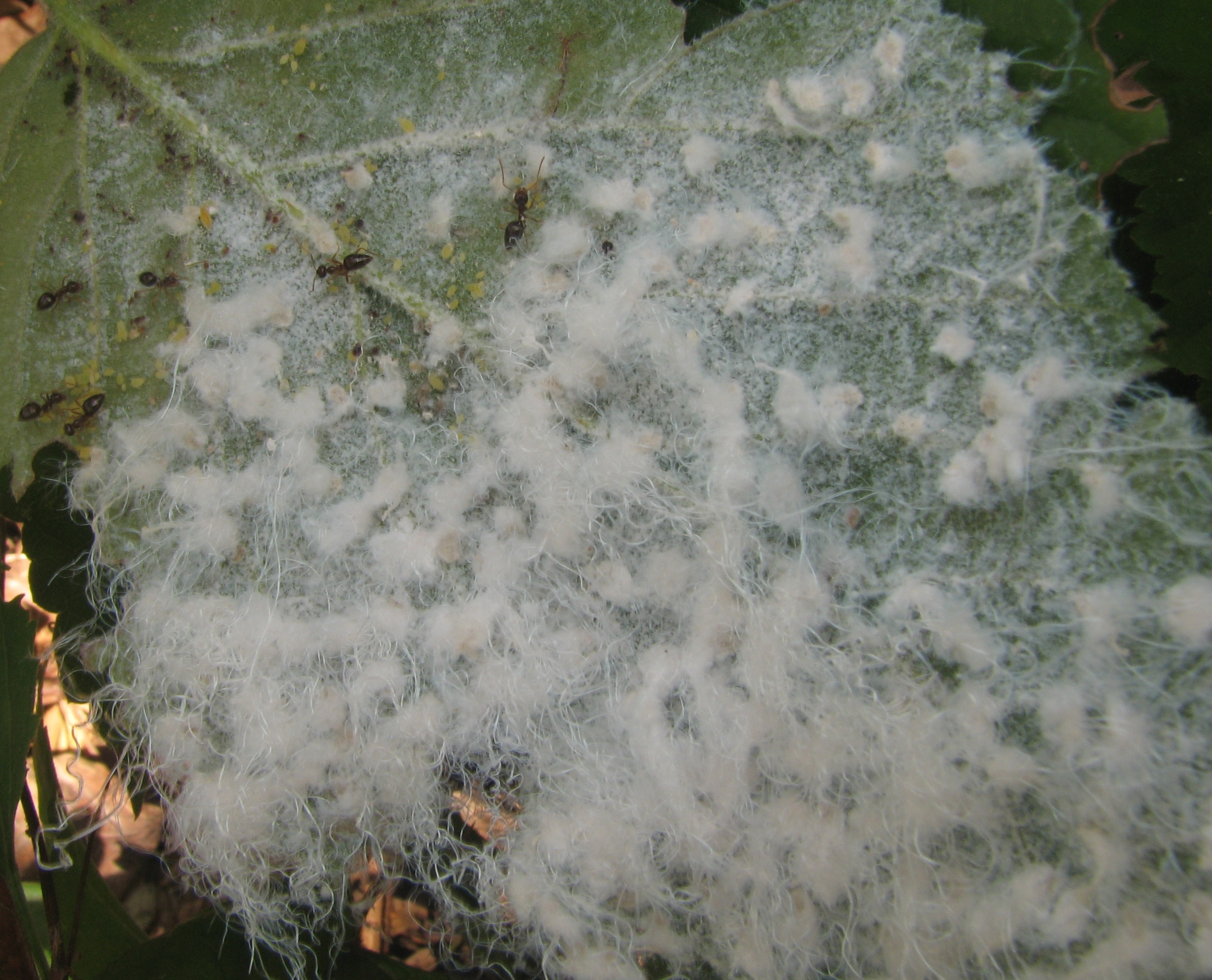
Phylloplecta tripunctata, nymphs on Rubus
