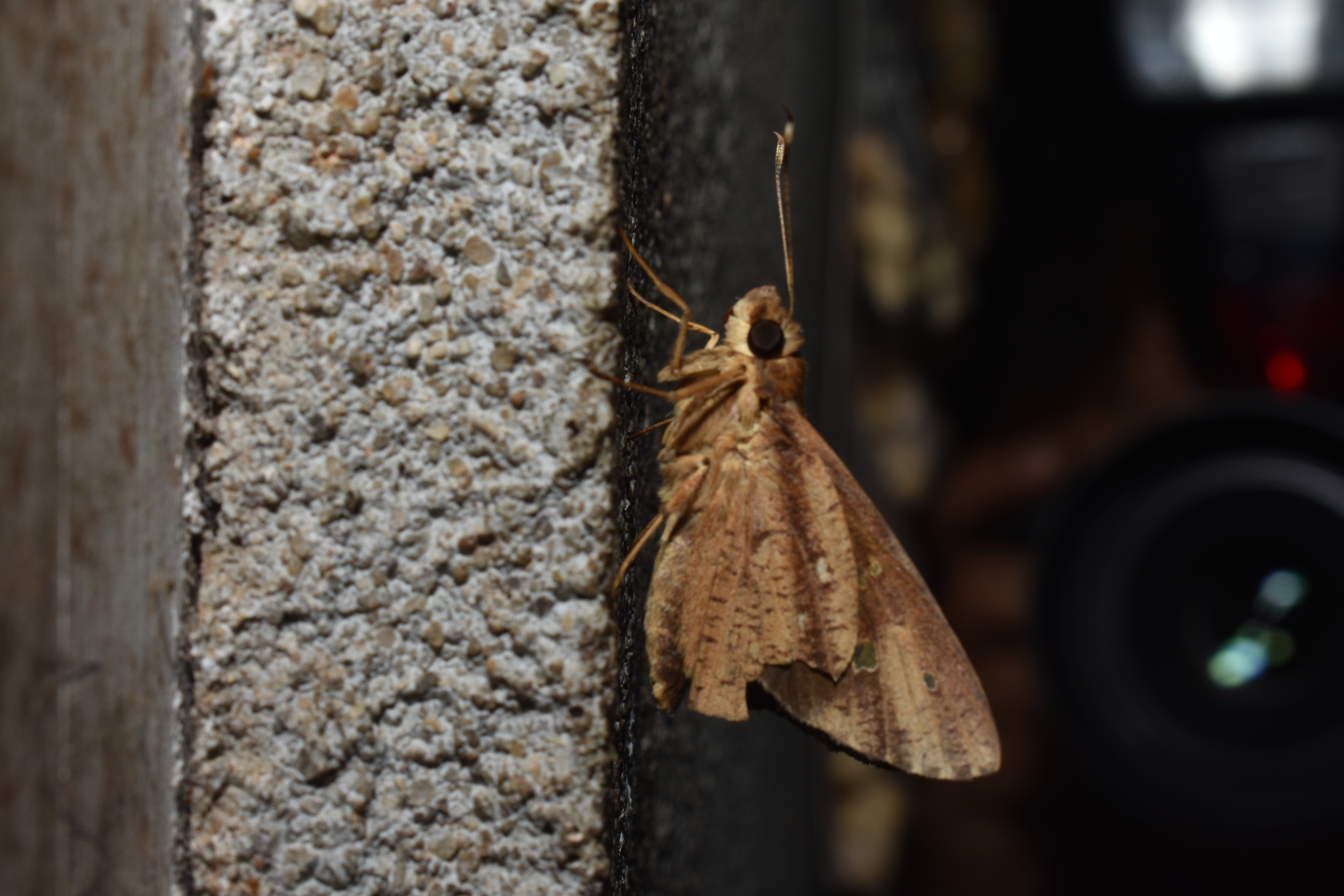

Scientific classification
- Kingdom: Animalia
- Phylum: Arthropoda
- Clade: Pancrustacea
- Class: Insecta
- Order: Lepidoptera
- Family: Hesperiidae
- Genus: Hidari
- Species: H. bhawani

Binomial name
- Hidari bhawani (de Nicéville, [1889])

= Hidari bhawani =

Species of butterfly

Hidari bhawani, the veined palmer, is a butterfly of the family Hesperiidae. The species was first described by Lionel de Nicéville in 1889. It resembles Hidari irava, but the hindwing beneath is marked with numerouscoarse brown transverse striae and exhibits a brown ray next- to the costa and anal margin. From the Arrakan Coast in Burma. and Vietnam.

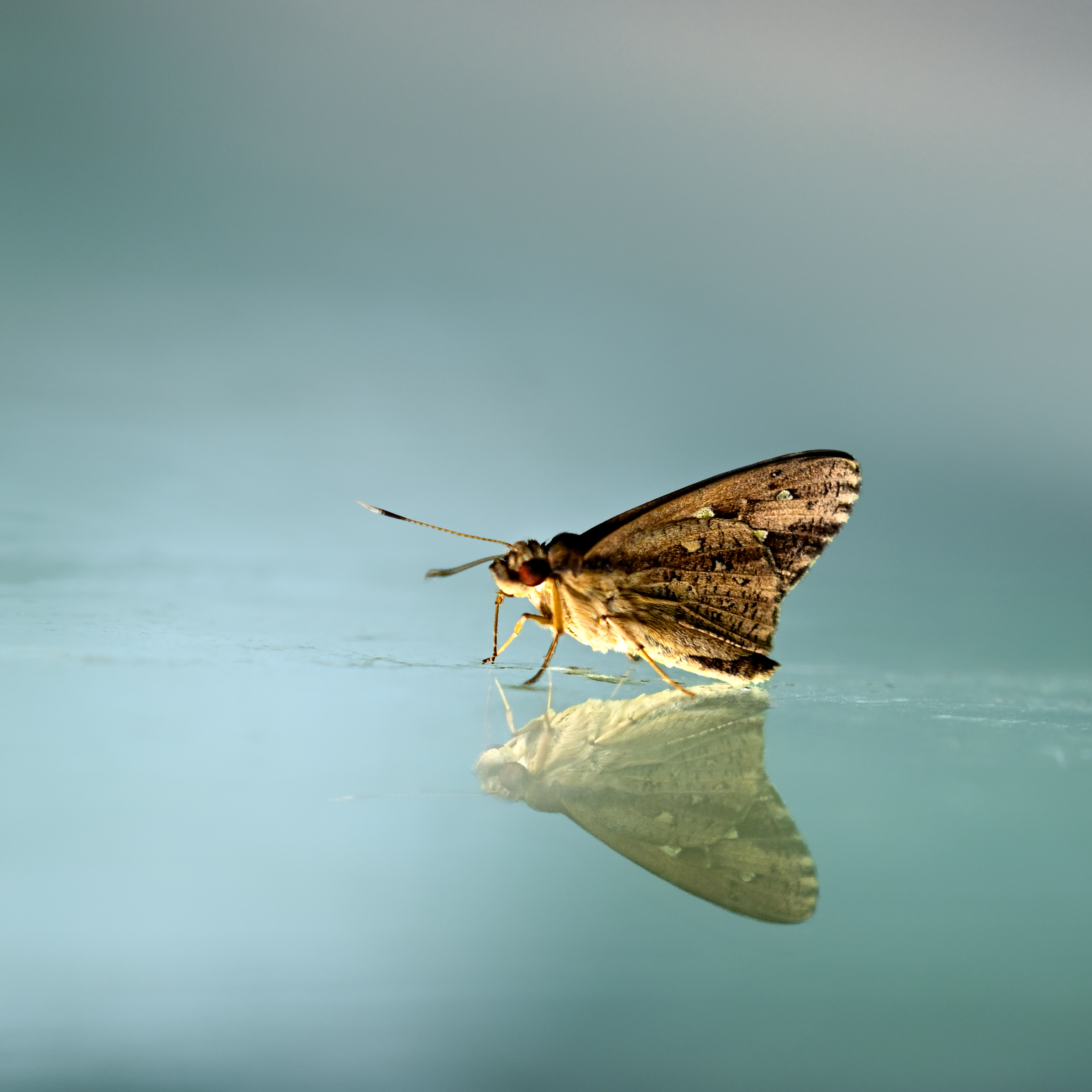
spotted in Dehing Patkai, Assam.

A short video of Hidari Bhawani
