= Friedrich Ludwig Krebs =

German author and botanist

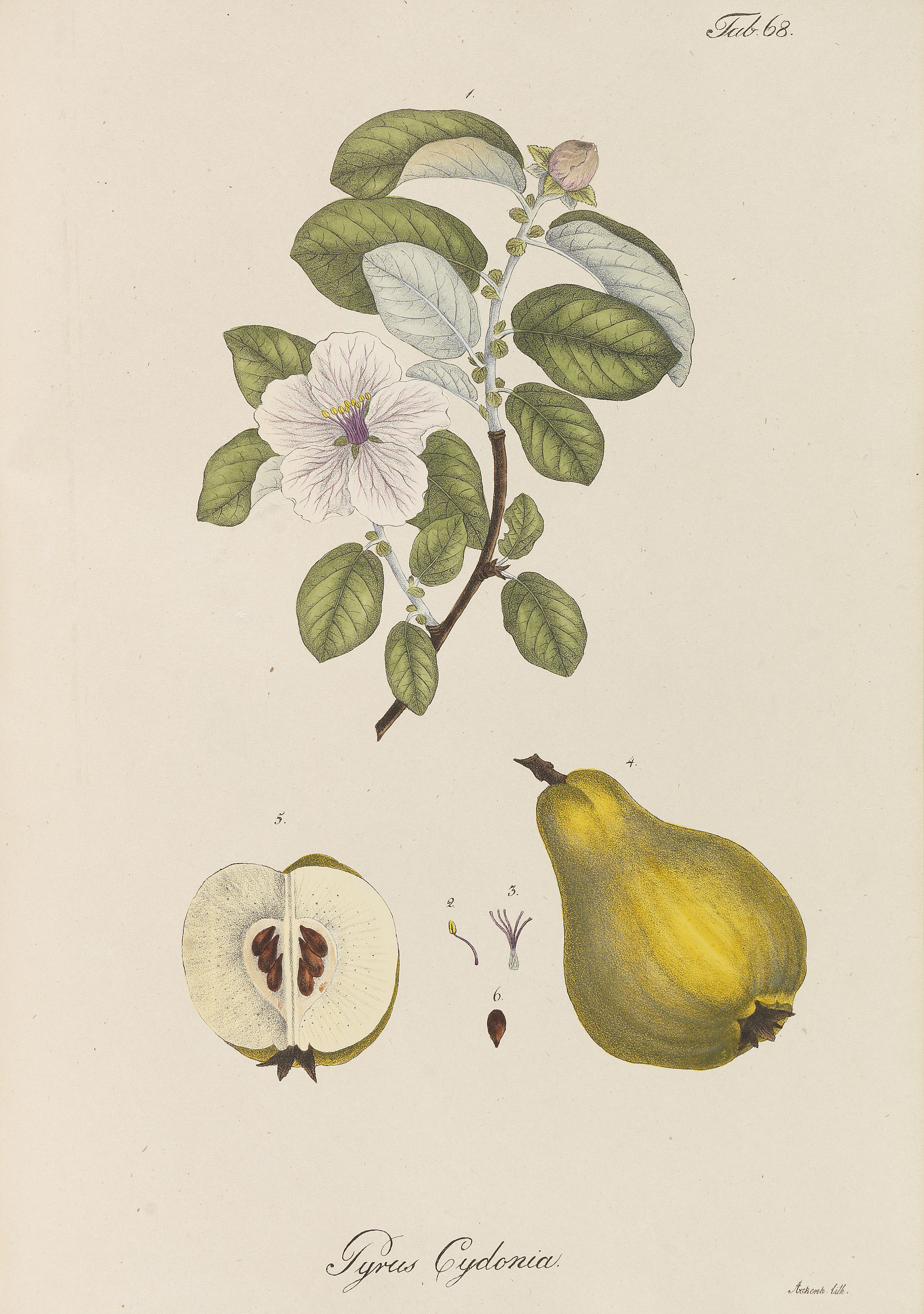
Cydonia oblonga Mill.

Friedrich Ludwig Krebs was a German author, noted for the illustrated work in 2 volumes, Vollständige Beschreibung und Abbildung der sämmtlichen Holzarten. This book was published in 1826-32 by Vieweg Verlag in Braunschweig. Johann Christian Peter Arckenhausen lithographed a large number of the 150 botanical plates for this work which dealt with trees growing in central and northern Germany. A further volume covering southern Germany and exotic species had been planned, but was dropped due to a lack of subscribers.
