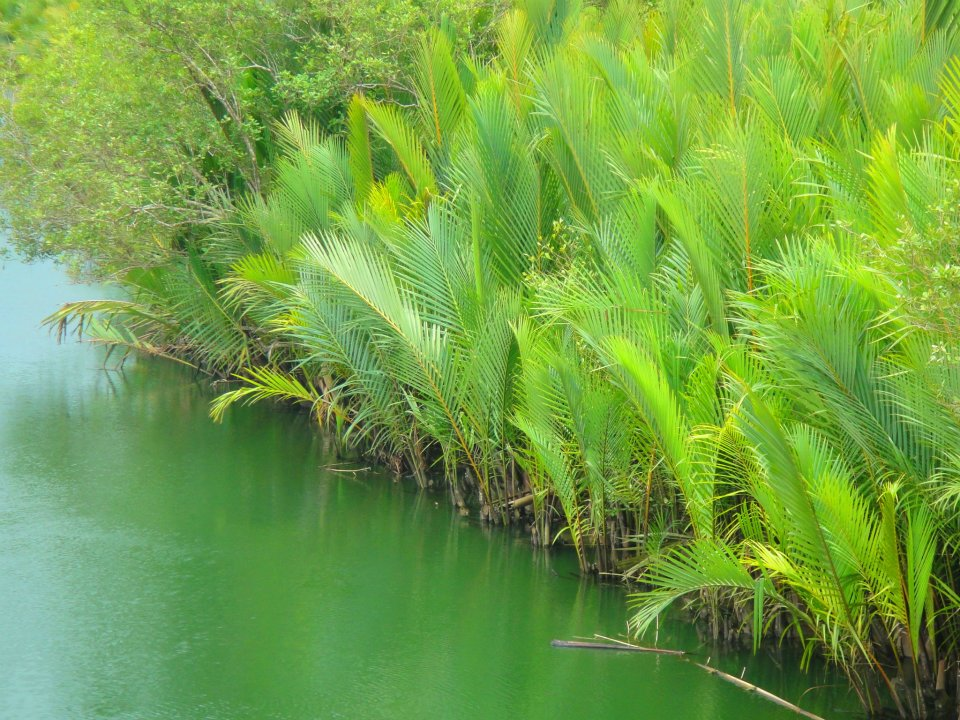
- Nipa palms in Bohol, Philippines

Conservation status
- Least Concern (IUCN 3.1)

Scientific classification
- Kingdom: Plantae
- Clade: Tracheophytes
- Clade: Angiosperms
- Clade: Monocots
- Clade: Commelinids
- Order: Arecales
- Family: Arecaceae
- Subfamily: Nypoideae; Griff.
- Genus: Nypa; Steck
- Species: N. fruticans

Binomial name
- Nypa fruticans Wurmb
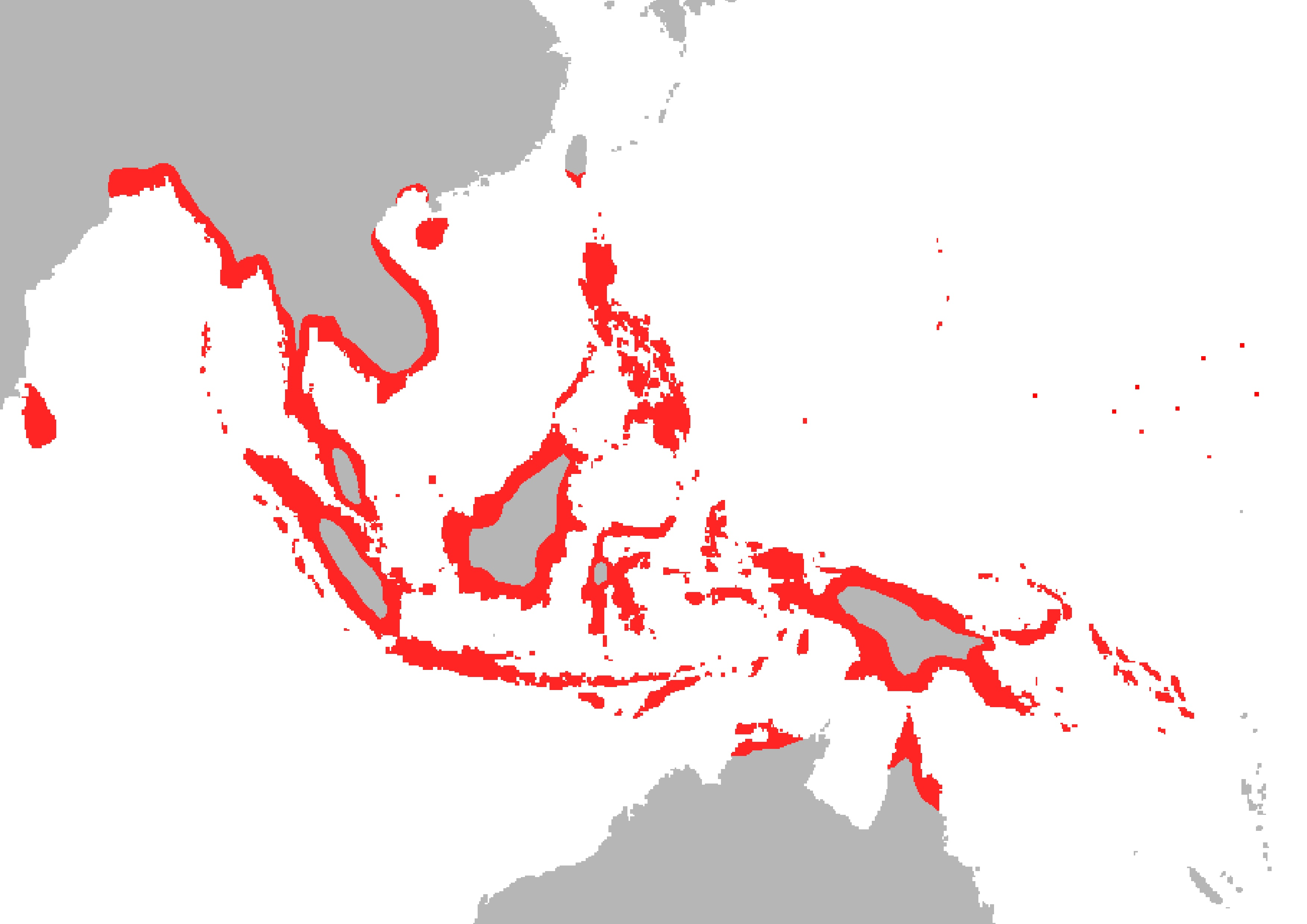

Synonyms
- Cocos nypa Lour.; Nipa arborescens Wurmb ex H.Wendl.; Nipa fruticans (Wurmb) Thunb.; Nipa litoralis Blanco; Nypa fruticans var. neameana F.M.Bailey

= Nypa fruticans =

Nipa palm Temporal range: 82–0 Ma Late Cretaceous - recent

Species of palm

Nypa fruticans, commonly known as the nipa palm (or simply nipa, from Malay: nipah) or mangrove palm, is a species of palm native to the coastlines and estuarine habitats of the Indian and Pacific Oceans. It is the only palm considered adapted to the mangrove biome. The genus Nypa and the subfamily Nypoideae are monotypic taxa because this species is their only member.

== Description ==
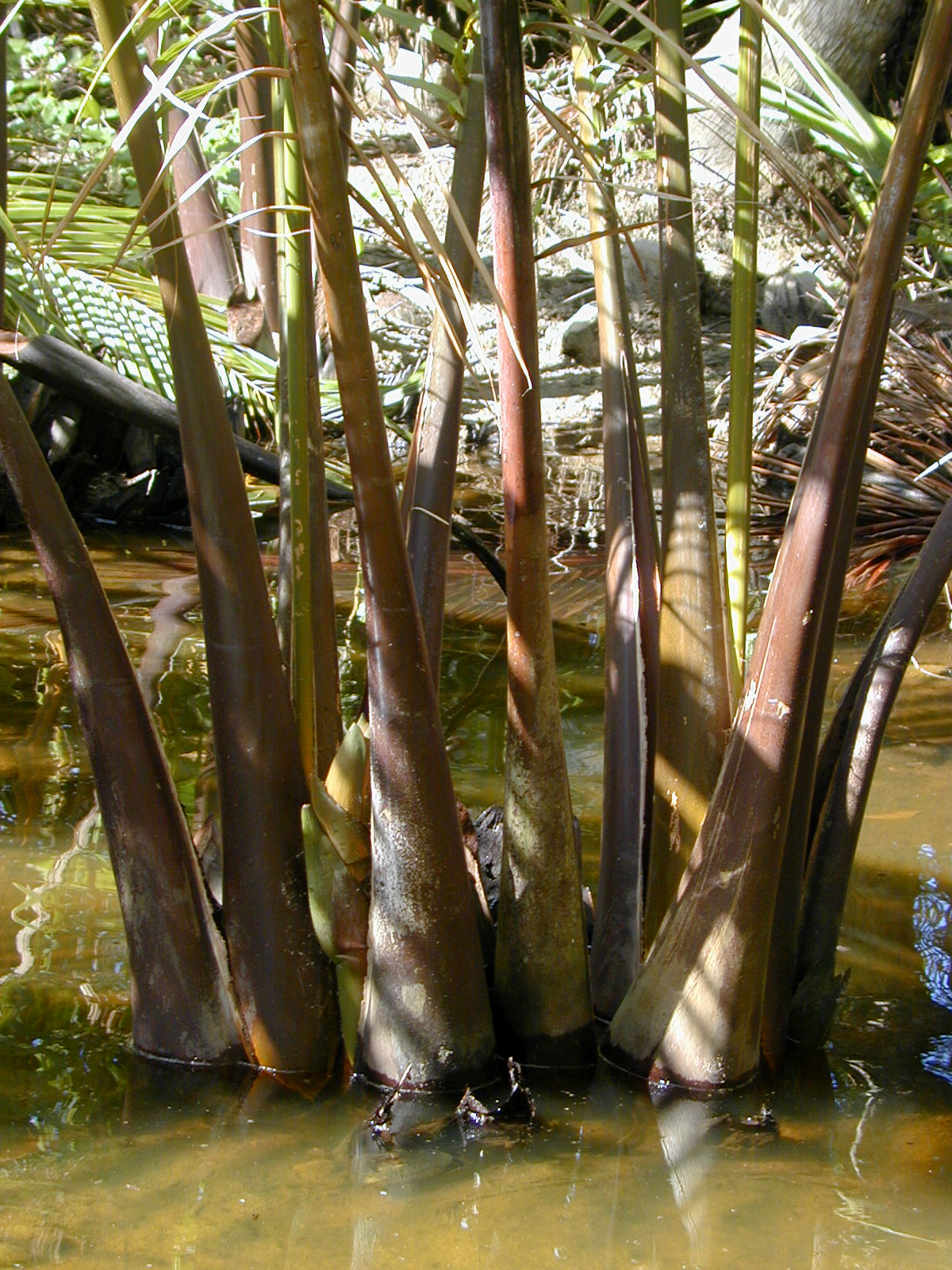
The trunk or stem of the nipa palm is under the mud. Only the leaves project upwards.

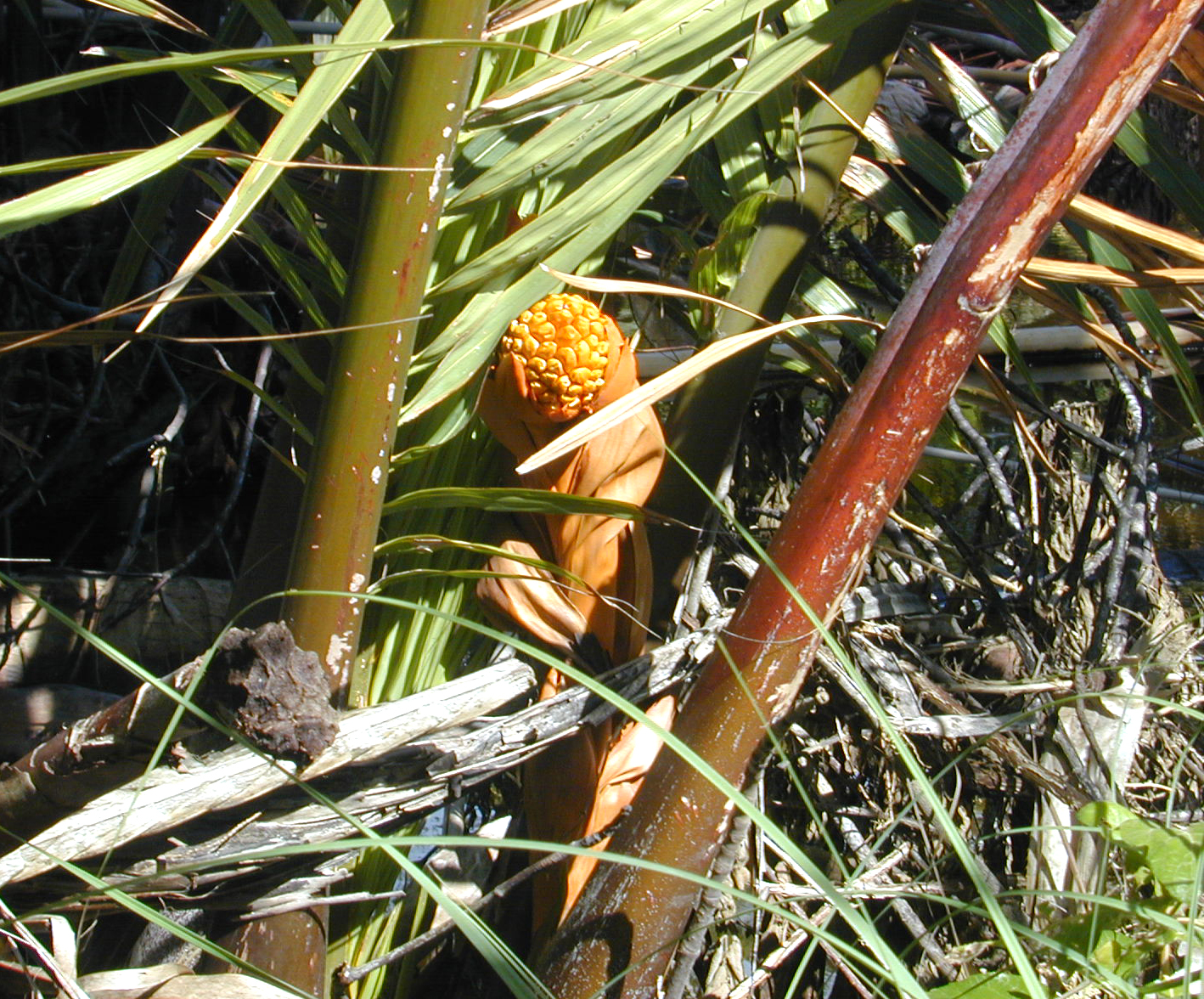
A globular flower cluster on a nipa palm

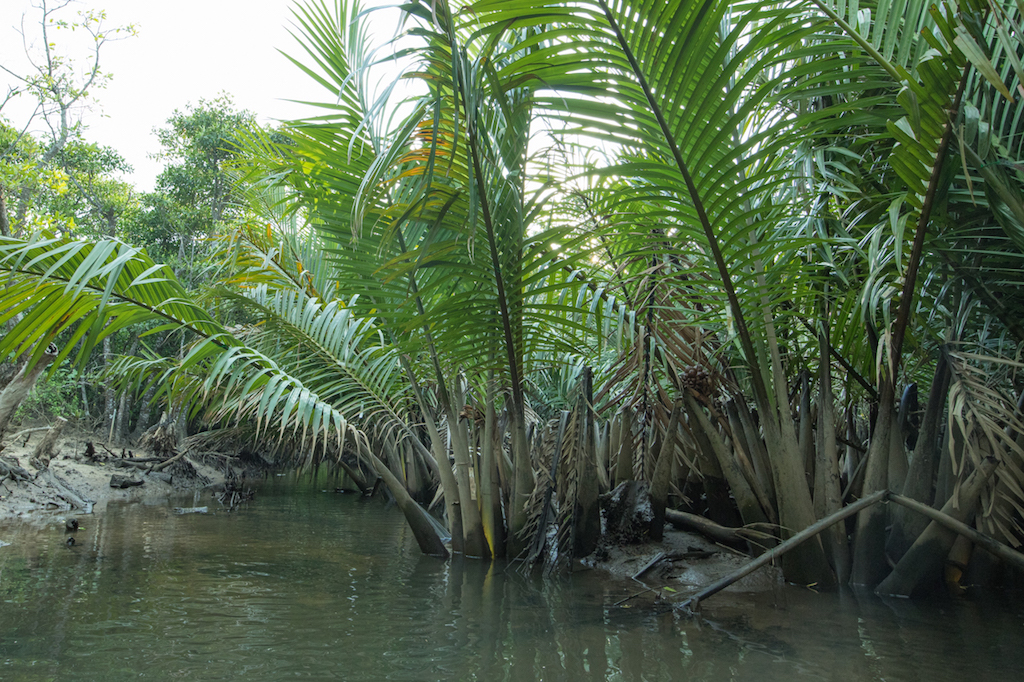
The northernmost distribution of Nypa fruticans is seen on Iriomote Island, Japan.

Unlike most palms, the nipa palm's trunk grows beneath the ground; only the leaves and flower stalk grow upwards above the surface. The leaves extend up to 9 metres (30 feet) in height.

The flowers are a globular inflorescence of female flowers at the tip with catkin-like red or yellow male flowers on the lower branches. The flower produces woody nuts arranged in a globular cluster up to 25 centimetres (10 inches) across on a single stalk. The infructescence can weigh as much as 30 kg (4 st 10 lb).

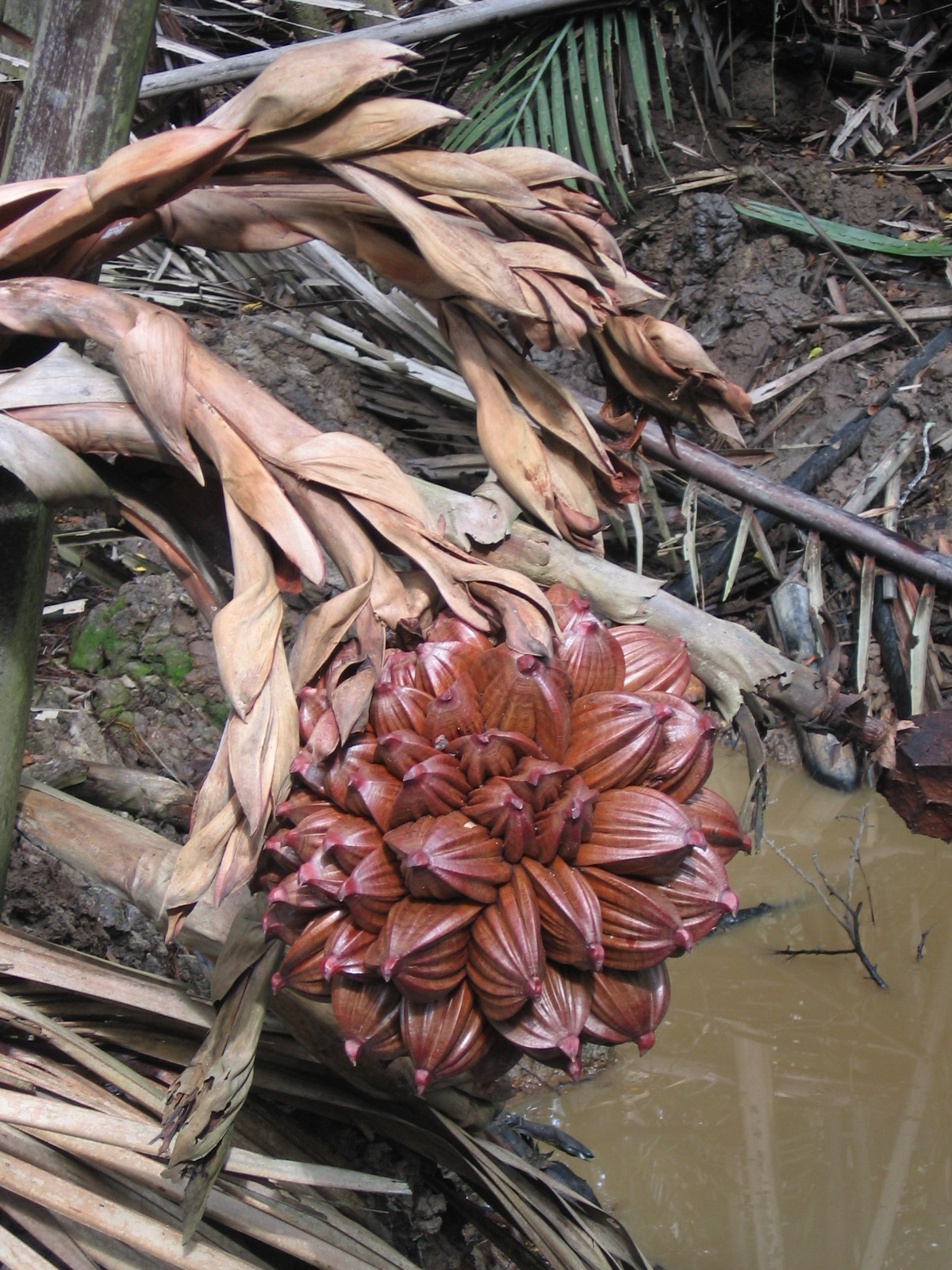
A globular fruit cluster of the nipa palm

The fruit is globular made of many seed segments, each seed has a fibrous husk covering the endosperm that allows it to float. The stalk droops as the fruits mature. When they reach that stage, the ripe seeds separate from the ball and float away on the tide, occasionally germinating while still water-borne.

== Biology ==
N.fruiticans is the only palm considered to be adapted to the mangrove biome. The exposed internal tissue of old leaf bases provide pathways for air to be exchanged with the submerged roots of the plants, similar in function to pneumatophores of other true mangroves. As the leaves develop, the leaf base hypertrophies and fills with spongey tissue connected with aerenchymous networks in the submerged roots. As leaves senesce, only the rachis is shed while the base is retained, which is impregnated with protective tannins, and can remain alive for up to 4 years.

== Ecology ==
N. fruticans is pollinated by small insects. Putative pollinators include:

- Drosophilidae flies and bees of the genus Trigona
- Apis florea (Asian dwarf honey bee) and Apis dorsata (Asian giant honey bee)
- Nitidulid and curculionid beetles

Long-tailed macaques (Macaca fascicularis) are known to eat the fruits of the nipa palm. Proboscis monkeys in the Padas Damit Forest Reserve have been observed eating the inflorescences. Bornean orangutans eat nipa palm hearts and shoots.

Fungal species Tirisporella beccariana has been found on the mangrove palm, as well as Phomatospora nypae on palms in Malaysia.

N.fruiticans is a host plant for several lepidopteran insect species, including:

Family Hesperiidae (skippers)

- Erionota thrax
- Gangara thyrsis
- Hidari irava

Family Crambidae

- Herculia nigrivitta
- Nacoleia octasema

Family Pyralidae

- Tirathaba leucotephras
- Tirathaba mundella
- Tirathaba rufivena

Family Tineidae

- Erechthias flavistriata

Family Limacodidae

- Parasa corbetti
- Parasa lepida

== Fossil record ==
While only one species of Nypa now exists, N. fruticans, with a natural distribution extending from Northern Australia through the Indonesian Archipelago and the Philippine Islands up to China, the genus Nypa once had a nearly global distribution in the Eocene (56–33.4 million years ago).

Fossil mangrove palm pollen from India has been dated to 70 million years ago.

Fossil fruits and seeds of Nypa have been described from the Maastrichtian and Danian sediments of the Dakhla Formation of Bir Abu Minqar, South Western Desert, Egypt.

Fossilized nuts of Nypa dating to the Eocene occur in the sandbeds of Branksome, Dorset, and in London Clay on the Isle of Sheppey, Kent, England.

A fossil species, N. australis, has been described from Early Eocene sediments at Macquarie Harbour on the western coast of Tasmania.

Fossils of Nypa have also been recovered from throughout the New World, in North and South America, dating from at least the Maastrichtian period of the Cretaceous through the Eocene, making its last appearance in the fossil record of North and South America in the late Eocene.

Assuming the habitat of extinct Nypa is similar to that of the extant species N. fruticans, the presence of Nypa fossils may indicate monsoonal or at least seasonal rainfall regimes, and likely tropical climates. The worldwide distribution of Nypa in the Eocene, especially in deposits from polar latitudes, is supporting evidence that the Eocene was a time of global warmth, prior to the formation of modern polar icecaps at the end of the Eocene.

== Distribution and habitat ==
Nipa palms grow in soft mud and slow-moving tidal and river waters that bring in nutrients. They can be found as far inland as the tide can deposit the floating nuts. They are common on coasts and rivers flowing into the Indian and Pacific Oceans, from India to the Pacific Islands. The palm will survive occasional short-term drying of its environment. Despite the name "mangrove palm" and its prevalence in coastal areas, it is only moderately salt tolerant and suffers if exposed to pure seawater; it prefers the brackish waters of estuaries.

It is considered native to China (Hainan), the Ryukyu Islands, Bangladesh, Indian subcontinent, Sri Lanka, the Andaman and Nicobar Islands, Vietnam, Laos, Malay Peninsula, north of Singapore, all of Borneo, Java, Maluku, the Philippines, Sulawesi, Sumatra, the Bismarck Archipelago, New Guinea, the Solomon Islands, the Caroline Islands, and Australia (Queensland and the Northern Territory). It is reportedly naturalized in Nigeria, the Society Islands of French Polynesia, the Mariana Islands, Panama, and Trinidad.

Japan's Iriomote Island and its neighboring Uchibanari Island are the most northern limit of the distribution.

== Uses ==
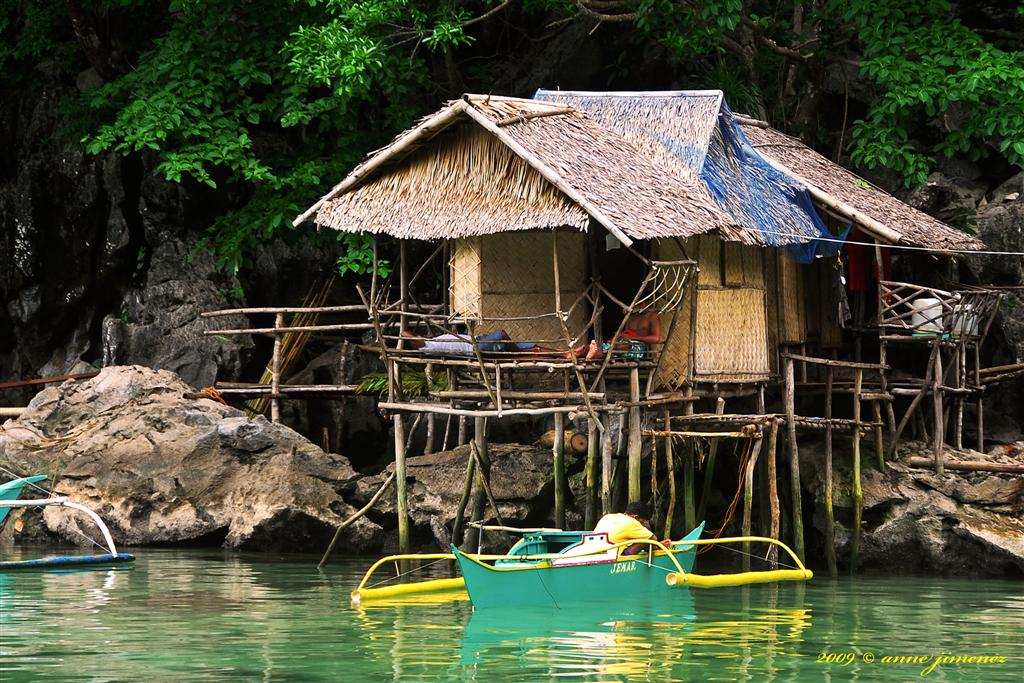
Nipa palm leaves used as thatching in a Tagbanwa stilt house (kamalig) in the Philippines

The long, feathery leaves of the nipa palm are used by local populations as roof material for thatched houses or dwellings. The leaves are also used in many types of basketry and thatching. Because they are buoyant, large stems are used to train swimmers in Burma.

On the islands of Roti and Savu, nipa palm sap is fed to pigs during the dry season. The sap is said to impart a sweet flavour to the meat. The young leaves are dried, bleached and cut to wrap tobacco for smoking; this practice is also found in Sumatra and northern Borneo especially among the Kadazan-Dusun, Bajau, Bruneian Malay and Sarawak Malay where it is called as sigup kirai or rokok apong within the latter region.

In Cambodia, this palm is called ចាក cha:k; its leaves are used to cover roofs.

Roof thatching with the leaves occurs in many places in Papua New Guinea. In some coastal areas, the rachis is used for walls in houses, and the leaflets are used for ornaments. The epidermises of the leaves are used as cigarette papers.

The leaves are also used in some handicraft works across Southeast Asia, such as the tempok among the Orang Asli tribes.

=== Food and beverages ===
The young flower stalk and hard seeds are edible and provide hydration.

In the Philippines and Malaysia, the inflorescence can be "tapped" to yield a sweet, edible sap collected to produce a local alcoholic beverage called tuba, bahal, or tuak. A fruit cluster is ready to be tapped when the unripe fruits are at their peak sweetness. The cluster is cut from the stalk about six inches down, and mud is rubbed on the stalk to induce sap flow. Sap begins flowing immediately if the fruit maturity was correctly gauged. A bamboo tube or a bottle is fitted over the cut stalk and the sap is collected twice daily, cutting a half centimeter slice off the end of the stalk after each collection to prevent it from gumming over. Sap flow will continue for 30 days per stalk, and the nipa flowers continuously throughout the year, providing a continuous supply of sap.

Tuba can be stored in tapayan (earthenware balloon vases) for several weeks to make a kind of vinegar known as sukang paombong in the Philippines and cuka nipah in Malaysia. Tuba can also be distilled to make arrack, locally known as lambanog in Filipino and arak or arak nipah in Indonesian. Young shoots are also edible; the flower petals can be infused to make an aromatic tisane. Attap chee (Chinese: 亞答子; pinyin: yà dá zǐ) (chee meaning "seed" in several Chinese dialects) is a name for the immature fruits—sweet, translucent, gelatinous balls used as a dessert ingredient in Thailand, Malaysia, the Philippines, and Singapore, that are a byproduct of the sap harvesting process.

In Indonesia, especially in Java and Bali, the sap is used to make a variant of Jaggery called gula nipah. In Sarawak, it is called gula apong.

In Thailand, leaf is used for dessert.

In Cambodia, its leaves are used for wrapping cakes (such as num katâm), and the flowers are sometimes used to make sugar, vinegar, and alcohol.

=== Biofuel ===
The nipa palm produces a very high yield of sugar-rich sap. Fermented into ethanol or butanol, the sap may allow the production of 6480–20,000 liters per hectare per year of fuel. By contrast, sugarcane yields roughly 5200 liters of ethanol per hectare per year, and an equivalent area planted in corn (maize) would produce only roughly 4000 liters per hectare per year, before accounting for the energy costs of the cultivation and alcohol extraction. Unlike corn and sugarcane, nipa palm sap requires little if any fossil fuel energy to produce from an established grove, does not require arable land, and can make use of brackish water instead of freshwater resources. Also unlike most energy crops, the nipa palm does not detract from food production to make fuel. In fact, since nipa fruit is an inevitable byproduct of sap production, it produces both food and fuel simultaneously.

== Cultivation ==
Wild stands of N. fruticans can be managed to optimize sap production by thinning to desired densities and through traditional farm management techniques.

In cultivation, N. fruticans readily propagates via rhizome divisions.

Pests of young seedlings include grapsid crabs, as well as monkeys and pigs, which have been reported to cause damage to plantations.

Sap is collected from the cut flower stalk, and traditional tapping methods vary by region; harvesters often repeatedly bend or kick the stalk to increase sap yield as part of local practice.

== See also ==
- Bahay kubo
- Mangrove
- Mangrove forests
