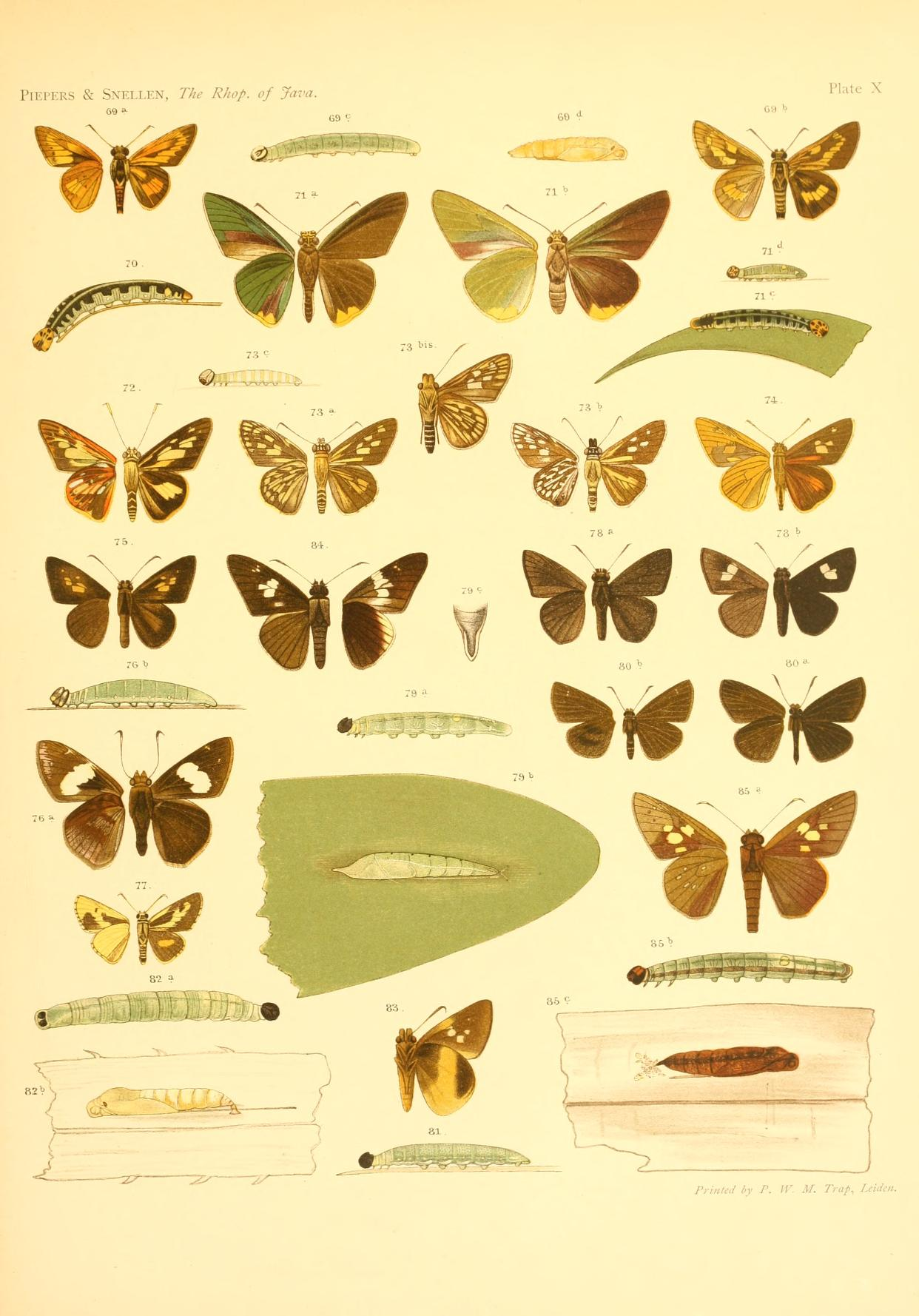
- Hidari irava Moore in Rhopalocera of Java (figure 85 a. male b.larva c.pupa )

Scientific classification
- Kingdom: Animalia
- Phylum: Arthropoda
- Class: Insecta
- Order: Lepidoptera
- Family: Hesperiidae
- Subfamily: Hesperiinae
- Tribe: Erionotini
- Genus: Hidari; Distant, 1886

= Hidari (skipper) =

Genus of butterflies

Hidari is a genus of grass skipper butterflies in the family Hesperiidae.

== Species ==
- Hidari irava (Moore, [1858]) Sumatra to Bali, Malaya, Indochina.
- Hidari doesoena Martin, 1895 Sumatra, Indochina
- Hidari bhawani de Nicéville, [1889] S. Vietnam.

== Biology ==
The larvae of Hidari irava feed on Palmae including Arenga, Caryota , Cocos, Elaeis, Livistona, Metroxylon, Nypa and Gramineae including Bambusa.
