= Tirathaba aperta =

Scientific classification
- Domain: Eukaryota
- Kingdom: Animalia
- Phylum: Arthropoda
- Class: Insecta
- Order: Lepidoptera
- Family: Pyralidae
- Genus: Tirathaba
- Species: T. aperta

Binomial name
- Tirathaba aperta (Strand, 1920)

Synonyms
- Suisharyona aperta Strand, 1920

Species of moth

Tirathaba aperta is a species of moth of the family Pyralidae. It was described by Embrik Strand in the year 1920. It is found in Taiwan.
