= Tirathaba complexa =

Scientific classification
- Domain: Eukaryota
- Kingdom: Animalia
- Phylum: Arthropoda
- Class: Insecta
- Order: Lepidoptera
- Family: Pyralidae
- Genus: Tirathaba
- Species: T. complexa

Binomial name
- Tirathaba complexa (Butler, 1885)

Synonyms
- Harpagoneura complexa Butler, 1885; Coleoneura tacanovella Ragonot, 1888; Heteromicta trichogramma Meyrick, 1886

Species of moth

Tirathaba complexa is a species of moth of the family Pyralidae. It was described by Arthur Gardiner Butler in 1885. It has been recorded from Tuvalu and Fiji.

The wingspan is about 25 mm. The forewings are whitish brown. The hindwings are almost white and semi-transparent.
