= Tirathaba grandinotella =

Scientific classification
- Kingdom: Animalia
- Phylum: Arthropoda
- Class: Insecta
- Order: Lepidoptera
- Family: Pyralidae
- Genus: Tirathaba
- Species: T. grandinotella

Binomial name
- Tirathaba grandinotella Hampson, 1898

Species of moth

Tirathaba grandinotella is a species of moth of the family Pyralidae. It was described by George Hampson in 1898. It is found in India (Assam) and on Ambon.

The wingspan is 28–38 mm. The forewings are dark purplish red with a small annulus in the base of the cell, a larger one at the middle and a discocellular annulus with black margins and purple-red centres. The outer margin is red with some dark suffusion inside it at the costa. There are some white points on the costa towards the apex and a marginal series. The hindwings are fuscous.
