= Tirathaba nitidalis =

Scientific classification
- Kingdom: Animalia
- Phylum: Arthropoda
- Class: Insecta
- Order: Lepidoptera
- Family: Pyralidae
- Genus: Tirathaba
- Species: T. nitidalis

Binomial name
- Tirathaba nitidalis Hampson, 1917

Species of moth

Tirathaba nitidalis is a species of moth of the family Pyralidae. It was described by George Hampson in 1917. It is found in New Guinea.

The wingspan is about 18 mm. The forewings are silvery white, with the costal edge black towards the base and with a diffused purplish-fuscous subterminal line, slightly excurved at the middle, the area beyond it faintly tinged with purplish fuscous. The hindwings are silvery white, the inner area slightly tinged with brown.
