= Tirathaba psolopasta =

Scientific classification
- Domain: Eukaryota
- Kingdom: Animalia
- Phylum: Arthropoda
- Class: Insecta
- Order: Lepidoptera
- Family: Pyralidae
- Genus: Tirathaba
- Species: T. psolopasta

Binomial name
- Tirathaba psolopasta (Turner, 1913)

Synonyms
- Acara psolopasta Turner, 1913

Species of moth

Tirathaba psolopasta is a species of moth of the family Pyralidae. It was described by Alfred Jefferis Turner in 1913. It is found in Australia, where it has been recorded from Queensland.

The wingspan is about 36 mm. The forewings are ochreous whitish, suffused with pale ochreous-grey, and sparsely irrorated (sprinkled)with dark fuscous. The hindwings are ochreous whitish.
