= Tirathaba epichthonia =

Scientific classification
- Kingdom: Animalia
- Phylum: Arthropoda
- Class: Insecta
- Order: Lepidoptera
- Family: Pyralidae
- Genus: Tirathaba
- Species: T. epichthonia

Binomial name
- Tirathaba epichthonia Meyrick, 1937

Species of moth

Tirathaba epichthonia is a species of moth of the family Pyralidae. It was described by Edward Meyrick in the year 1937. It is found on Fiji.
