= Tirathaba cyclophora =

Scientific classification
- Kingdom: Animalia
- Phylum: Arthropoda
- Class: Insecta
- Order: Lepidoptera
- Family: Pyralidae
- Genus: Tirathaba
- Species: T. cyclophora

Binomial name
- Tirathaba cyclophora (Hampson, 1917)

Synonyms
- Aphomia cyclophora Hampson, 1917

Species of moth

Tirathaba cyclophora is a species of moth of the family Pyralidae. It was described by George Hampson in 1917. It is found in New Guinea.

The wingspan is about 34 mm. The forewings are pale purplish red irrorated (sprinkled) with blackish and with a minute annulus incompletely defined by black scales in the middle of the cell and a more complete discoidal annulus. There are traces of a diffused dark postmedial line, oblique to vein 5, then inwardly oblique and somewhat dentate. There are also traces of a curved dark subterminal line and there is a terminal series of black bars. The hindwings are ochreous yellow tinged with brown except on the inner area. There is a slight brown terminal line.
