= Tirathaba catharopa =

Scientific classification
- Kingdom: Animalia
- Phylum: Arthropoda
- Clade: Pancrustacea
- Class: Insecta
- Order: Lepidoptera
- Family: Pyralidae
- Genus: Tirathaba
- Species: T. catharopa

Binomial name
- Tirathaba catharopa (Turner, 1937)

Synonyms
- Harpagomorpha catharopa Turner, 1937

Species of moth

Tirathaba catharopa is a species of moth of the family Pyralidae. It was described by Alfred Jefferis Turner in 1937. It is found in Australia, where it has been recorded from Queensland.
