= Tirathaba albifusa =

Scientific classification
- Kingdom: Animalia
- Phylum: Arthropoda
- Class: Insecta
- Order: Lepidoptera
- Family: Pyralidae
- Genus: Tirathaba
- Species: T. albifusa

Binomial name
- Tirathaba albifusa (Hampson, 1917)

Synonyms
- Aphomia albifusa Hampson, 1917

Species of moth

Tirathaba albifusa is a species of moth of the family Pyralidae. It was described by George Hampson in 1917. It is found on Sulawesi.

The wingspan is about 26 mm for males and 30 mm for females. The forewings of the males are pale brown with a broad fascia of white suffusion below the costa extending at the base to the inner margin. Forewings of the females are entirely suffused with pale brown and irrorated (speckled) with darker brown. There are reddish streaks from the base of the median nervure in and below the cell and a dark terminal line. The hindwings are orange yellow.
