= Tirathaba rufivena =

Coconut spike moth

Scientific classification
- Domain: Eukaryota
- Kingdom: Animalia
- Phylum: Arthropoda
- Class: Insecta
- Order: Lepidoptera
- Family: Pyralidae
- Genus: Tirathaba
- Species: T. rufivena

Binomial name
- Tirathaba rufivena (Busck, 1916)

Synonyms
- Lamoria rufivena Walker, 1864; Harpagoneura acrocausta Meyrick, 1897; Mucialla fuscolimbalis Snellen, 1900; Harpagoneura distorta Turner, 1937; Melissoblaptes rufovenalis Snellen, 1880; Tirathaba ignivena Hampson, 1917

Worms that eat oil-/coconut-palm flowers

Tirathaba rufivena, the coconut spike moth, greater coconut spike moth or oil palm bunch moth, is a moth of the family Pyralidae. It is found from south-east Asia to the Pacific islands, including Malaysia, the Cook Islands, the Philippines and the tropical region of Queensland, Australia. They are considered as a minor pest.

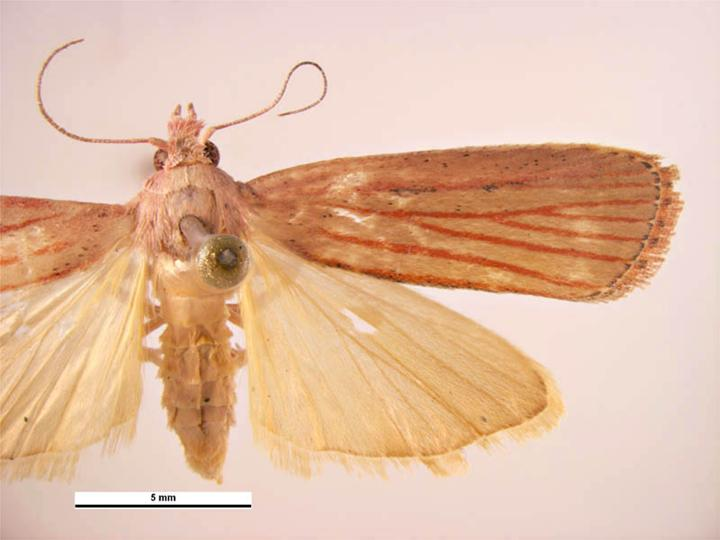
Female

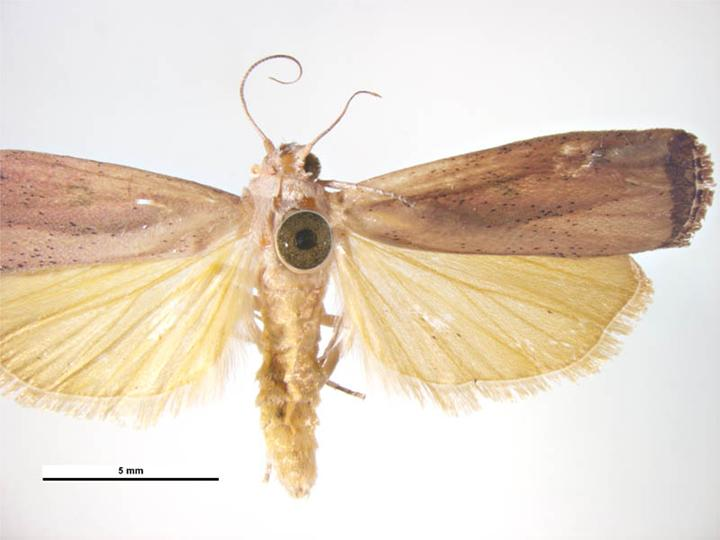
Male

== Description ==
Its wingspan is about 26–30 millimetres (1–1 1/4 in). More or less developed annuli at middle and end of the cell connected by a white streak, sometimes with a spot in base of cell also joined by the white streak. The inner margin, vein 1, the interno-median interspace and veins beyond lower angle of cell streaked with crimson. A dark marginal line. The hindwings are plain pale yellow or orange yellow.

== Ecology and attack ==
The larvae are an agricultural pest that feeds on Cocos nucifera, Nypa fruticans, Elaeis guineensis, Musa species, and Phaseolus species. Usually the caterpillar attacks male flowers where infestation causes abortion of young and results in underdeveloped fruits. A severe attack can wilt the plant and delay plant development. They are not borers, and only show external feeding.

== Control ==
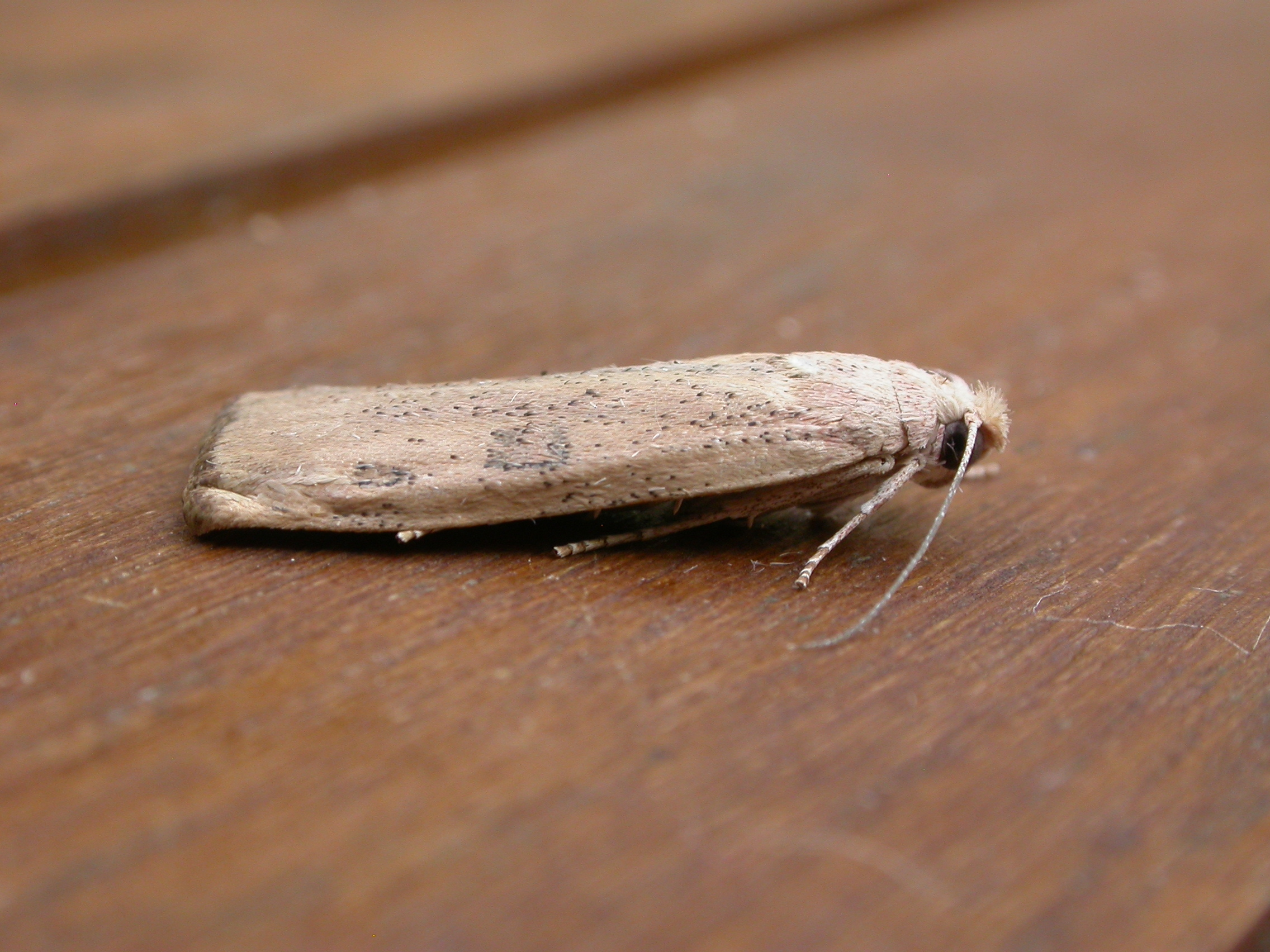
Living specimen

Biological control is the most effective method of controlling both larval and egg stages. Many different strains of parasites and pathogens are used. The pathogens such as Beauveria bassiana, and Metarhizium anisopliae are also used in many regions. An ichneumonid Venturia palmaris are experimented in Malaysia, where they attack larva in November and December.

Agrophylax basifulva, a tachinid fly, is a known parasitoid used in Fiji which has not been successfully used elsewhere because of difficulties in rearing sufficient numbers. Another unsuccessful potential biocontrol is the entomoparasitic nematode Steinernema feltiae.

Other than that, hand picking and other traditional methods are used in many countries.
