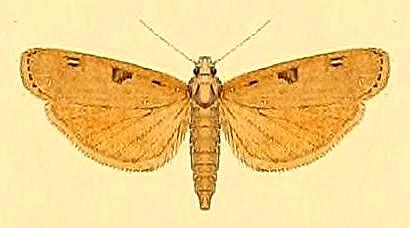

Scientific classification
- Kingdom: Animalia
- Phylum: Arthropoda
- Class: Insecta
- Order: Lepidoptera
- Family: Pyralidae
- Genus: Tirathaba
- Species: T. pseudocomplana

Binomial name
- Tirathaba pseudocomplana Hampson, 1917

= Tirathaba pseudocomplana =

Species of moth

Tirathaba pseudocomplana is a species of moth of the family Pyralidae. It was described by George Hampson in 1917. It is found in New Guinea, on the D'Entrecasteaux Islands, the Solomon Islands and in Australia (the Northern Territory and Queensland).

The wingspan is about 30 mm. The wings are brown with variable subcostal markings on the forewings.

The larvae feed on Ficus racemosa.
