= Tirathaba unicolorella =

Scientific classification
- Kingdom: Animalia
- Phylum: Arthropoda
- Clade: Pancrustacea
- Class: Insecta
- Order: Lepidoptera
- Family: Pyralidae
- Genus: Tirathaba
- Species: T. unicolorella

Binomial name
- Tirathaba unicolorella (Hampson, 1896)

Synonyms
- Mucialla unicolorella Hampson, 1896

Species of moth

Tirathaba unicolorella is a species of moth of the family Pyralidae. It was described by George Hampson in 1896. It is found in Bhutan and India (Assam).

The wingspan is about 34 mm. Adults are uniform pale olive green, the forewings with a few scattered black scales and small raised specks of black scales at the middle and end of the cell, as well as an indistinct minutely dentate curved postmedial line. The hindwings are slightly paler.
