= Tirathaba cissinobaphes =

Scientific classification
- Domain: Eukaryota
- Kingdom: Animalia
- Phylum: Arthropoda
- Class: Insecta
- Order: Lepidoptera
- Family: Pyralidae
- Genus: Tirathaba
- Species: T. cissinobaphes

Binomial name
- Tirathaba cissinobaphes (Turner, 1906)

Synonyms
- Mellissoblaptes cissinobaphes Turner, 1906; Aphomia astericta Turner, 1937

Species of moth

Tirathaba cissinobaphes is a species of moth of the family Pyralidae. It was described by Alfred Jefferis Turner in 1906. It is found in Australia, where it has been recorded from Queensland.

The wingspan is about 24 mm. The forewings are ochreous whitish, mixed with dark fuscous and reddish fuscous, in the posterior part of the disc, the dark scales form lines along the veins. There is a large oval green suffusion on the dorsum from one-fifth nearly to the tornus, reaching nearly to the middle of the disc, and there is a slight green suffusion at the apex, as well as a series of minute dark-fuscous dots on the termen and apical fourth of the costa. The hindwings are dull ochreous, the apical fourth suffused with dull greenish.
