= Tirathaba irrufatella =

Scientific classification
- Domain: Eukaryota
- Kingdom: Animalia
- Phylum: Arthropoda
- Class: Insecta
- Order: Lepidoptera
- Family: Pyralidae
- Genus: Tirathaba
- Species: T. irrufatella

Binomial name
- Tirathaba irrufatella Ragonot, 1901

Species of moth

Tirathaba irrufatella is a species of moth of the family Pyralidae. It was described by Émile Louis Ragonot in 1901. It is found in Japan.
