= Tirathaba acyperella =

Scientific classification
- Kingdom: Animalia
- Phylum: Arthropoda
- Class: Insecta
- Order: Lepidoptera
- Family: Pyralidae
- Genus: Tirathaba
- Species: T. acyperella

Binomial name
- Tirathaba acyperella (Hampson, 1901)

Synonyms
- Metachrysia acyperella Hampson, 1917; Metachrysia acyperella Hampson, 1901

Species of moth

Tirathaba acyperella is a species of moth of the family Pyralidae described by George Hampson in 1901. It is found on the D'Entrecasteaux Islands.
