= Tirathaba ruptilinea =

Scientific classification
- Kingdom: Animalia
- Phylum: Arthropoda
- Class: Insecta
- Order: Lepidoptera
- Family: Pyralidae
- Genus: Tirathaba
- Species: T. ruptilinea

Binomial name
- Tirathaba ruptilinea (Walker, 1866)

Synonyms
- Lamoria ruptilinea Walker, 1866; Tirathaba chlorosema Lower, 1903

Species of moth

Tirathaba ruptilinea is a species of moth of the family Pyralidae. It was described by Francis Walker in 1866. It is found in Australia and South East Asia.
