= Tirathaba albilineata =

Scientific classification
- Domain: Eukaryota
- Kingdom: Animalia
- Phylum: Arthropoda
- Class: Insecta
- Order: Lepidoptera
- Family: Pyralidae
- Genus: Tirathaba
- Species: T. albilineata

Binomial name
- Tirathaba albilineata Whalley, 1964

Species of moth

Tirathaba albilineata is a species of moth of the family Pyralidae. It was described by Whalley in the year 1964. It is found on Sumatra.
