= Tirathaba =

- Tirathaba rufivena

Scientific classification
- Kingdom: Animalia
- Phylum: Arthropoda
- Class: Insecta
- Order: Lepidoptera
- Family: Pyralidae
- Subfamily: Galleriinae
- Tribe: Tirathabini
- Genus: Tirathaba; Walker, 1864

Synonyms
- Coleoneura Ragonot, 1888; Harpagoneura Butler, 1885; Harpagomorpha Walker, 1864; Metachrysia Hampson in Ragonot, 1901; Mucialla Walker, 1866; Suisharyona Strand, 1920

Genus of moths

Tirathaba is a genus of moths of the family Pyralidae described by Francis Walker in 1864.

== Species ==
- Tirathaba acyperella (Hampson in Ragonot, 1901)
- Tirathaba albifusa (Hampson, 1917)
- Tirathaba albilineata Whalley, 1964
- Tirathaba aperta (Strand, 1920)
- Tirathaba catharopa (Turner, 1937)
- Tirathaba cissinobaphes (Turner, 1906)
- Tirathaba citrinoides Whalley, 1964
- Tirathaba complexa (Butler, 1885)
- Tirathaba cyclophora (Hampson, 1917)
- Tirathaba epichthonia Meyrick, 1937
- Tirathaba expurgata Whalley, 1964
- Tirathaba fuscistriata Hampson, 1917
- Tirathaba grandinotella Hampson, 1898
- Tirathaba haematella Hampson in Ragonot, 1901
- Tirathaba irrufatella Ragonot, 1901
- Tirathaba leucostictalis (Lower, 1903)
- Tirathaba leucotephras Meyrick, 1936
- Tirathaba maculifera Hampson, 1917
- Tirathaba monoleuca Lower, 1894
- Tirathaba mundella Walker, 1864
- Tirathaba nitidalis Hampson, 1917
- Tirathaba pallida Whalley, 1964
- Tirathaba parasiticus (T. P. Lucas, 1898)
- Tirathaba pseudocomplana Hampson, 1917
- Tirathaba psolopasta (Turner, 1913)
- Tirathaba purpurella Hampson, 1917
- Tirathaba rosella Hampson, 1898
- Tirathaba rufivena (Walker, 1864)
- Tirathaba ruptilinea (Walker, 1866)
- Tirathaba unicolorella (Hampson, 1896)
- Tirathaba xuthoptera (Turner, 1937)

== Former species ==
- Tirathaba acrocausta Meyrick 1897
- Tirathaba distorta Turner 1937
- Tirathaba fructivora Meyrick 1933
- Tirathaba fuscolimbalis Snellen 1900
- Tirathaba hannoveri Whalley 1964
- Tirathaba hepialivora Hampson 1901
- Tirathaba trichogramma Meyrick 1886
