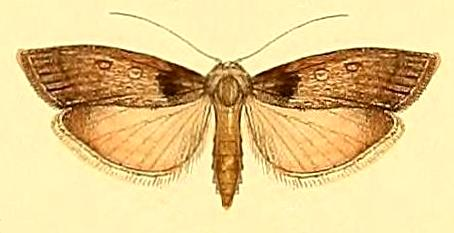

Scientific classification
- Kingdom: Animalia
- Phylum: Arthropoda
- Clade: Pancrustacea
- Class: Insecta
- Order: Lepidoptera
- Family: Pyralidae
- Genus: Tirathaba
- Species: T. parasiticus

Binomial name
- Tirathaba parasiticus (T. P. Lucas, 1898)

Synonyms
- Melissoblaptes parasiticus T. P. Lucas, 1898; Harpagoneura hepialivora Hampson in Ragonot & Hampson, 1901

= Tirathaba parasiticus =

Species of moth

Tirathaba parasiticus is a species of moth of the family Pyralidae. It was described by Thomas Pennington Lucas in 1898. It is found in Australia, where it has been recorded from Queensland and New South Wales.

The wingspan is about 35 mm.
