= Tirathaba citrinoides =

Scientific classification
- Domain: Eukaryota
- Kingdom: Animalia
- Phylum: Arthropoda
- Class: Insecta
- Order: Lepidoptera
- Family: Pyralidae
- Genus: Tirathaba
- Species: T. citrinoides

Binomial name
- Tirathaba citrinoides Whalley, 1964

Synonyms
- Tirathaba citrinoides hannoveri Whalley, 1964

Species of moth

Tirathaba citrinoides is a species of moth of the family Pyralidae. It was described by Whalley in the year 1964 . It is found on the Bismarck Archipelago.
