= Johann Christian Peter Arckenhausen =

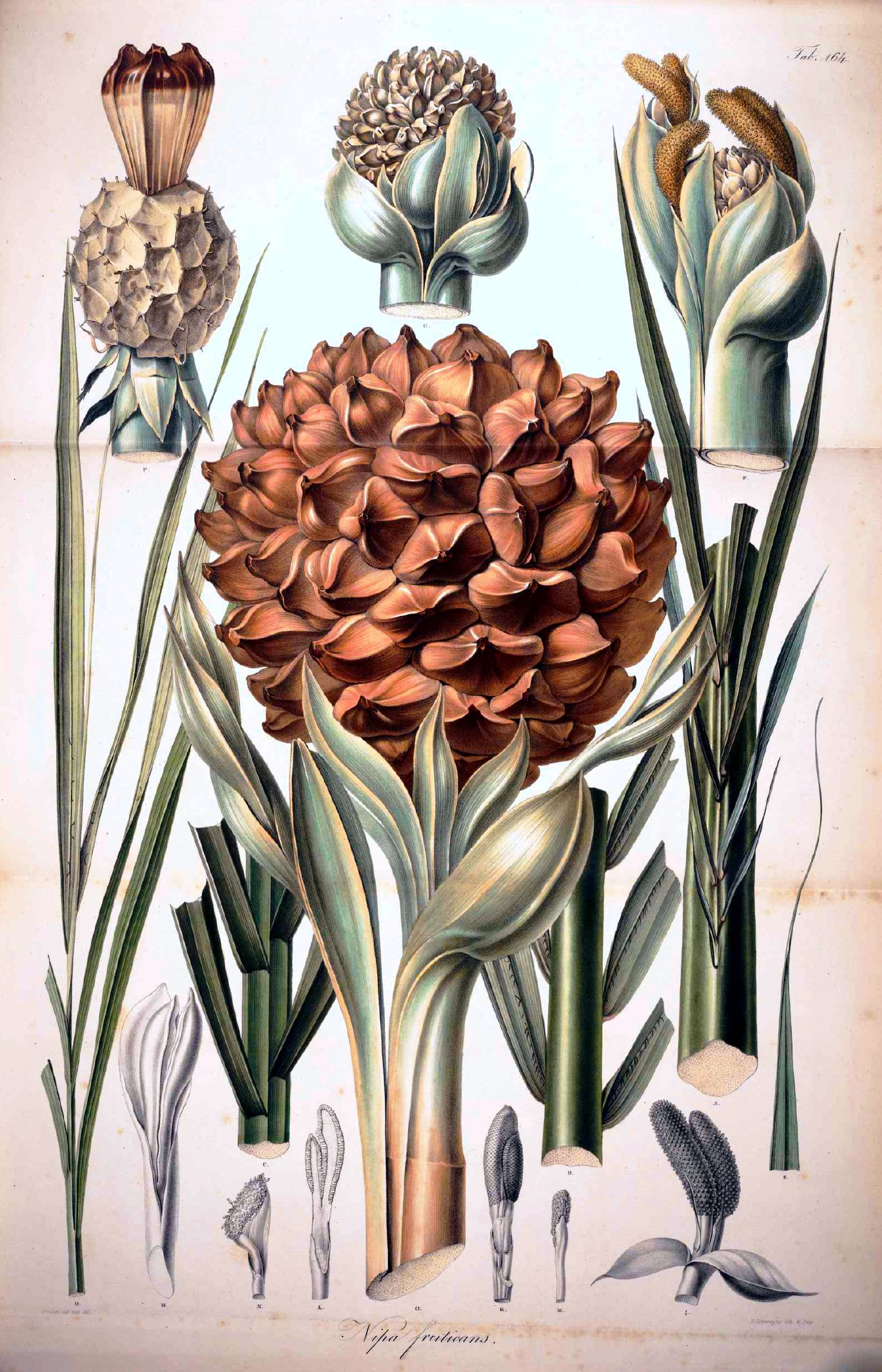
Nypa fruticans Wurmb

Johann Christian Peter Arckenhausen (3 September 1784, in Goslar – 28 April 1855, in Goslar) was a German drawing teacher, draftsman and natural history illustrator.

Johann Arckenhausen's father was a master shoemaker. Johann probably received training as a writer and draftsman in order to pursue a career as a drawing teacher in Goslar and as a specialist book illustrator. He was a founding member of the 'Naturwissenschaftlichen Vereins Goslar', started on 23 October 1852, and which curated a large part of his scientific and artistic legacy. Arckenhausen created a herbarium as well as an insect collection as the basis for his illustrations.
