= Tirathaba rosella =

Scientific classification
- Kingdom: Animalia
- Phylum: Arthropoda
- Class: Insecta
- Order: Lepidoptera
- Family: Pyralidae
- Genus: Tirathaba
- Species: T. rosella

Binomial name
- Tirathaba rosella Hampson, 1898

Species of moth

Tirathaba rosella is a species of moth of the family Pyralidae. It was described by George Hampson in 1898. It was described from Assam, India.

The wingspan is about 34 mm. The forewings are pale reddish brown, irrorated (sprinkled) with black scales and with an indistinct blackish antemedial line, very oblique from the costa to the middle of the cell, then angled inwards below the cell. There are four or five black points below the subcostal nervure towards the end of the cell and a very indistinct postmedial line. There is also a prominent marginal series of black points. The hindwings are dull reddish-pink.
