= Tirathaba fuscistriata =

Scientific classification
- Kingdom: Animalia
- Phylum: Arthropoda
- Class: Insecta
- Order: Lepidoptera
- Family: Pyralidae
- Genus: Tirathaba
- Species: T. fuscistriata

Binomial name
- Tirathaba fuscistriata Hampson, 1917

Species of moth

Tirathaba fuscistriata is a species of moth of the family Pyralidae. It was described by George Hampson in 1917. It is found in New Guinea.

The wingspan is about 30 mm. The forewings are ochreous grey tinged with purplish red brown and the veins of the costal half are streaked with blackish. There are traces of postmedial and subterminal series of slight brownish spots and the apical part of the costa and termen has a series of dark striae. The hindwings are dull ochreous, the costal area tinged with brown.
