= Tirathaba leucostictalis =

Scientific classification
- Domain: Eukaryota
- Kingdom: Animalia
- Phylum: Arthropoda
- Class: Insecta
- Order: Lepidoptera
- Family: Pyralidae
- Genus: Tirathaba
- Species: T. leucostictalis

Binomial name
- Tirathaba leucostictalis (Lower, 1903)

Synonyms
- Eldana leucostictalis Lower, 1903

Species of moth

Tirathaba leucostictalis is a species of moth of the family Pyralidae. It was described by Oswald Bertram Lower in 1903. It is found in Australia, where it has been recorded from Queensland.

The wingspan is about 26 mm. The forewings are deep flashy red, deepest on the costal half. There is a small dull whitish spot in the middle of the wing at one-third from the base and a second, much smaller one in a longitudinal line at one-third, and a third midway between those two. The hindwings are greyish, faintly tinged with fuscous on the posterior half.
