= Tirathaba haematella =

Scientific classification
- Kingdom: Animalia
- Phylum: Arthropoda
- Class: Insecta
- Order: Lepidoptera
- Family: Pyralidae
- Genus: Tirathaba
- Species: T. haematella

Binomial name
- Tirathaba haematella Hampson, 1901

Species of moth

Tirathaba haematella is a species of moth of the family Pyralidae. It was described by George Hampson in 1901. It is found on the Aru Islands.
