= Tirathaba maculifera =

Scientific classification
- Kingdom: Animalia
- Phylum: Arthropoda
- Class: Insecta
- Order: Lepidoptera
- Family: Pyralidae
- Genus: Tirathaba
- Species: T. maculifera

Binomial name
- Tirathaba maculifera Hampson, 1917

Species of moth

Tirathaba maculifera is a species of moth of the family Pyralidae. It was described by George Hampson in 1917. It is found on New Guinea, the D'Entrecasteaux Islands and Louisiade Islands.

The wingspan is 24–30 mm. The forewings are white, with the area and submedian fold tinged with ferruginous. The wing is mottled with ferruginous spots, especially along the submedian fold and an ill-defined subterminal band. There is a short streak in the base of the cell and spots at the middle of the cell and upper angle. There is also a terminal series of points. The hindwings are orange yellow.
