= Tirathaba purpurella =

Scientific classification
- Kingdom: Animalia
- Phylum: Arthropoda
- Class: Insecta
- Order: Lepidoptera
- Family: Pyralidae
- Genus: Tirathaba
- Species: T. purpurella

Binomial name
- Tirathaba purpurella Hampson, 1917

Species of moth

Tirathaba purpurella is a species of moth of the family Pyralidae. It was described by George Hampson in 1917. It is found on the Louisiade Islands in Papua New Guinea.

The wingspan is about 38 mm. The forewings are purple suffused with fuscous, the veins streaked with fuscous and with a rufous discoidal spot. The hindwings are greyish fuscous, somewhat ochreous towards the base.
