= Tirathaba xuthoptera =

Scientific classification
- Domain: Eukaryota
- Kingdom: Animalia
- Phylum: Arthropoda
- Class: Insecta
- Order: Lepidoptera
- Family: Pyralidae
- Genus: Tirathaba
- Species: T. xuthoptera

Binomial name
- Tirathaba xuthoptera (Turner, 1937)

Synonyms
- Heteromicta xuthoptera Turner, 1937

Species of moth

Tirathaba xuthoptera is a species of moth of the family Pyralidae. It was described by Alfred Jefferis Turner in 1937. It is found in Australia.
