= Tirisporella =

Scientific classification
- Kingdom: Fungi
- Division: Ascomycota
- Class: Sordariomycetes
- Order: Tirisporellales
- Family: Tirisporellaceae
- Genus: Tirisporella; E.B.G. Jones, K.D. Hyde & Alias
- Species: T. beccariana

Binomial name
- Tirisporella beccariana E.B.G. Jones, K.D. Hyde & Alias

Synonyms
- Sphaeria beccariana Ces., Atti Accad. Sci. fis. mat. Napoli 8(no. 3): 20 (1879); Melanomma cesatianum Sacc., Syll. fung. (Abellini) 2: 113 (1883); Brunaudia beccariana (Ces.) Kuntze [as 'Bruneaudia'], Revis. gen. pl. (Leipzig) 3(3): 447 (1898); Gibberidea nipae Henn., Hedwigia 47: 257 (1908)

Genus of fungi

Tirisporella is a genus of fungi in the class Dothideomycetes. The relationship of this taxon to other taxa within the class was unknown (incertae sedis), until 2015 when it was placed in order Diaporthales. A monotypic genus, it contains the single species Tirisporella beccariana (Ces.) E.B.G. Jones, K.D. Hyde & Alias (1996) which was found on the from the mangrove palm Nypa fruticans.

It was placed in the family Tirisporellaceae Suetrong, E.B.G. Jones & K.L. Pang in 2015. It was then placed in its own order Tirisporellales.
