= Tirathaba leucotephras =

Scientific classification
- Kingdom: Animalia
- Phylum: Arthropoda
- Class: Insecta
- Order: Lepidoptera
- Family: Pyralidae
- Genus: Tirathaba
- Species: T. leucotephras

Binomial name
- Tirathaba leucotephras Meyrick, 1936

Species of moth

Tirathaba leucotephras is a species of moth of the family Pyralidae. It was described by Edward Meyrick in 1936. It is found in Malaysia.
