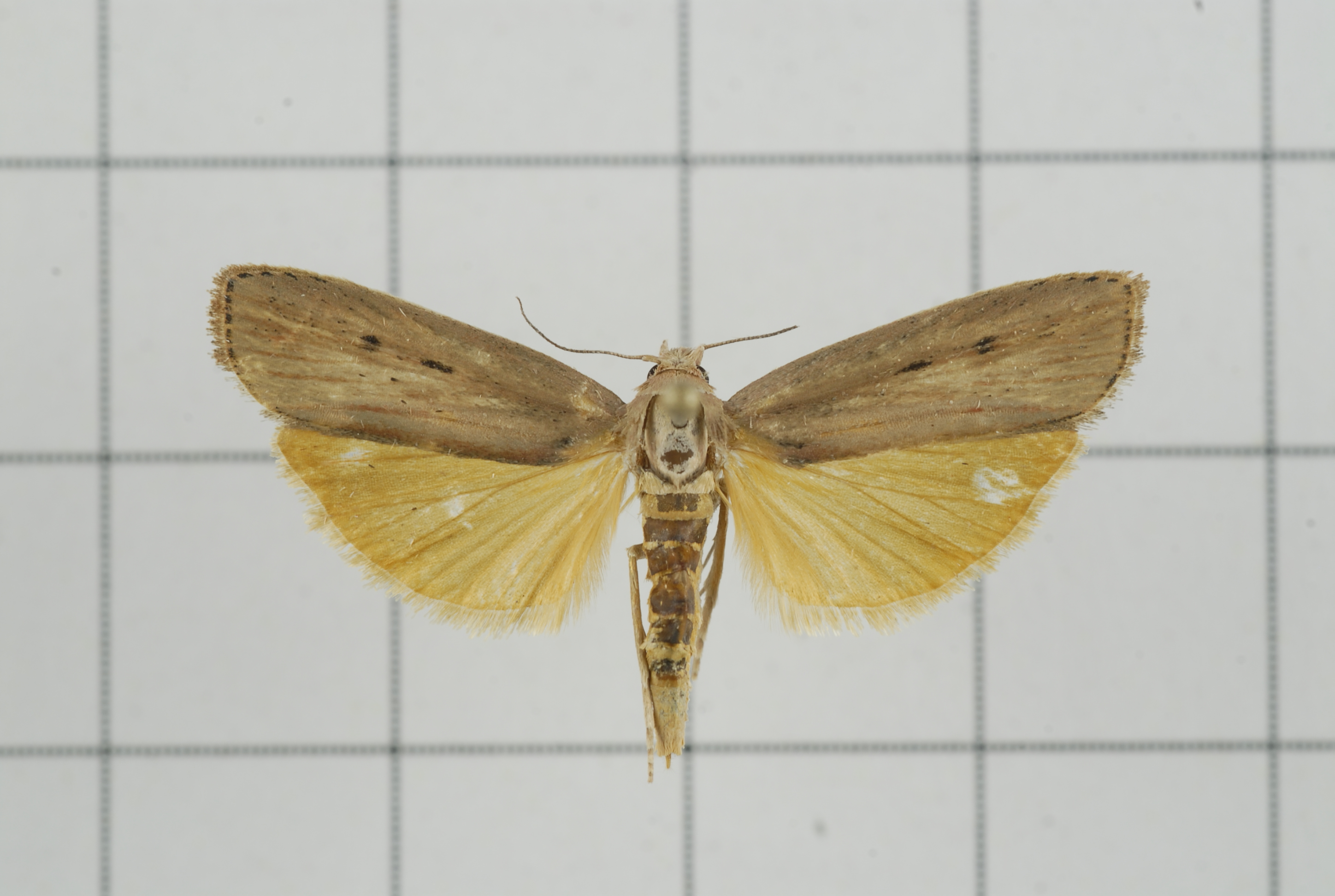

Scientific classification
- Domain: Eukaryota
- Kingdom: Animalia
- Phylum: Arthropoda
- Class: Insecta
- Order: Lepidoptera
- Family: Pyralidae
- Genus: Tirathaba
- Species: T. mundella

Binomial name
- Tirathaba mundella Walker, 1864

Synonyms
- Melissoblaptes fructivora Meyrick, 1933; Mucialla mundella Walker, 1866

= Tirathaba mundella =

Worms that eat oil-/betelnut-palm flowers

Tirathaba mundella, the oil palm bunch moth, is a species of snout moth. It is found in Malaysia.

The larvae feed on Areca catechu, Elaeis guineensis, Mangifera indica and Nephelium lappaceum.
