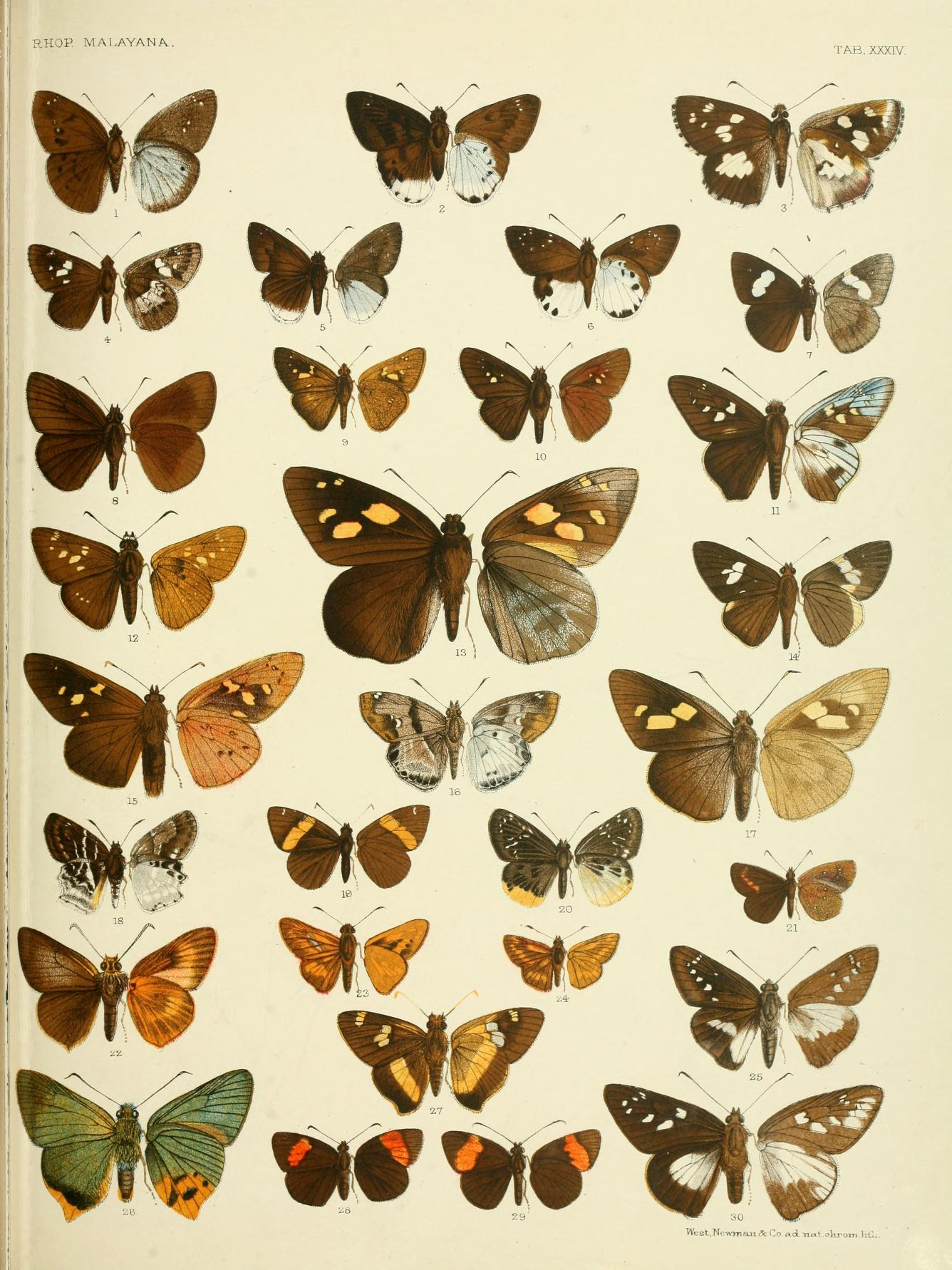
- Hidari irava in Rhopalocera Malayana (figure 15)

Scientific classification
- Kingdom: Animalia
- Phylum: Arthropoda
- Clade: Pancrustacea
- Class: Insecta
- Order: Lepidoptera
- Family: Hesperiidae
- Genus: Hidari
- Species: H. irava

Binomial name
- Hidari irava (Moore, [1858])

Synonyms
- Hesperia irava Moore, [1858]

= Hidari irava =

Species of butterfly

Hidari irava, commonly known as the coconut skipper, is a species of butterfly in the family Hesperiidae. It is found in southern Myanmar, Thailand, western Malaysia, as well as on Sumatra, Java, Borneo and the Sula Islands.

The wingspan is 45–55 mm. Above dark brown with 4 typically arranged discal hyaline spots, 1 in the cell, 1 below it in the .submedian area, 1 between the median sbranches, and 1 upwards and outwards from the latter; besides there is also often a very diminutive subapical spot. The under surface is lighter, more reddish greyish-brown, and often exhibits, particularly in the several small, very indistinct spots being scattered in the disc. — The larva is dull leaf-coloured green with some dark longitudinal stripes and a brown, darker marked head; between spun leaves of various palms, particularly Cocos and sago-palms; it changes into a brown pupa with a dark lateral line in which the cover of the proboscis does not reach to the abdominal end. The imagines fly in the evening, whilst in daytime they rest in bamboo-thickets and the crowns of palms. Malacca, Sumatra, Java, Bali, nearly everywhere common.

The larvae feed on Bambusa species and Cocos nucifera.
