= Herpetogramma atropunctalis =

Scientific classification
- Domain: Eukaryota
- Kingdom: Animalia
- Phylum: Arthropoda
- Class: Insecta
- Order: Lepidoptera
- Family: Crambidae
- Genus: Herpetogramma
- Species: H. atropunctalis

Binomial name
- Herpetogramma atropunctalis (Mabille, 1900)

Synonyms
- Pachyzancla atropunctalis Mabille, 1900

Species of moth

Herpetogramma atropunctalis is a species of moth in the family Crambidae. It was described by Paul Mabille in 1900. It is found on Madagascar.
