= Herpetogramma cleoropa =

Scientific classification
- Kingdom: Animalia
- Phylum: Arthropoda
- Class: Insecta
- Order: Lepidoptera
- Family: Crambidae
- Genus: Herpetogramma
- Species: H. cleoropa

Binomial name
- Herpetogramma cleoropa (Meyrick, 1934)

Synonyms
- Oeobia cleoropa Meyrick, 1934

Species of moth

Herpetogramma cleoropa is a species of moth in the family Crambidae. It was described by Edward Meyrick in 1934. It is found on the Marquesas Archipelago, where it has been recorded from Hiva Oa.
