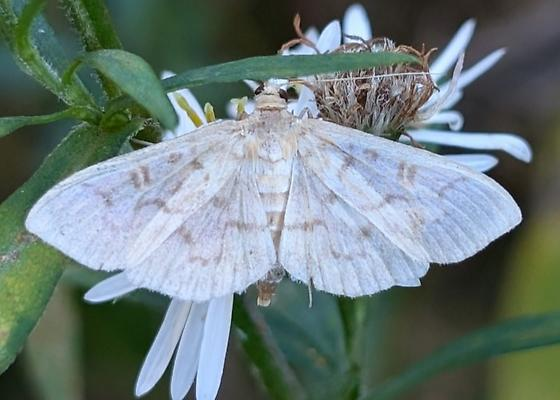
- Female
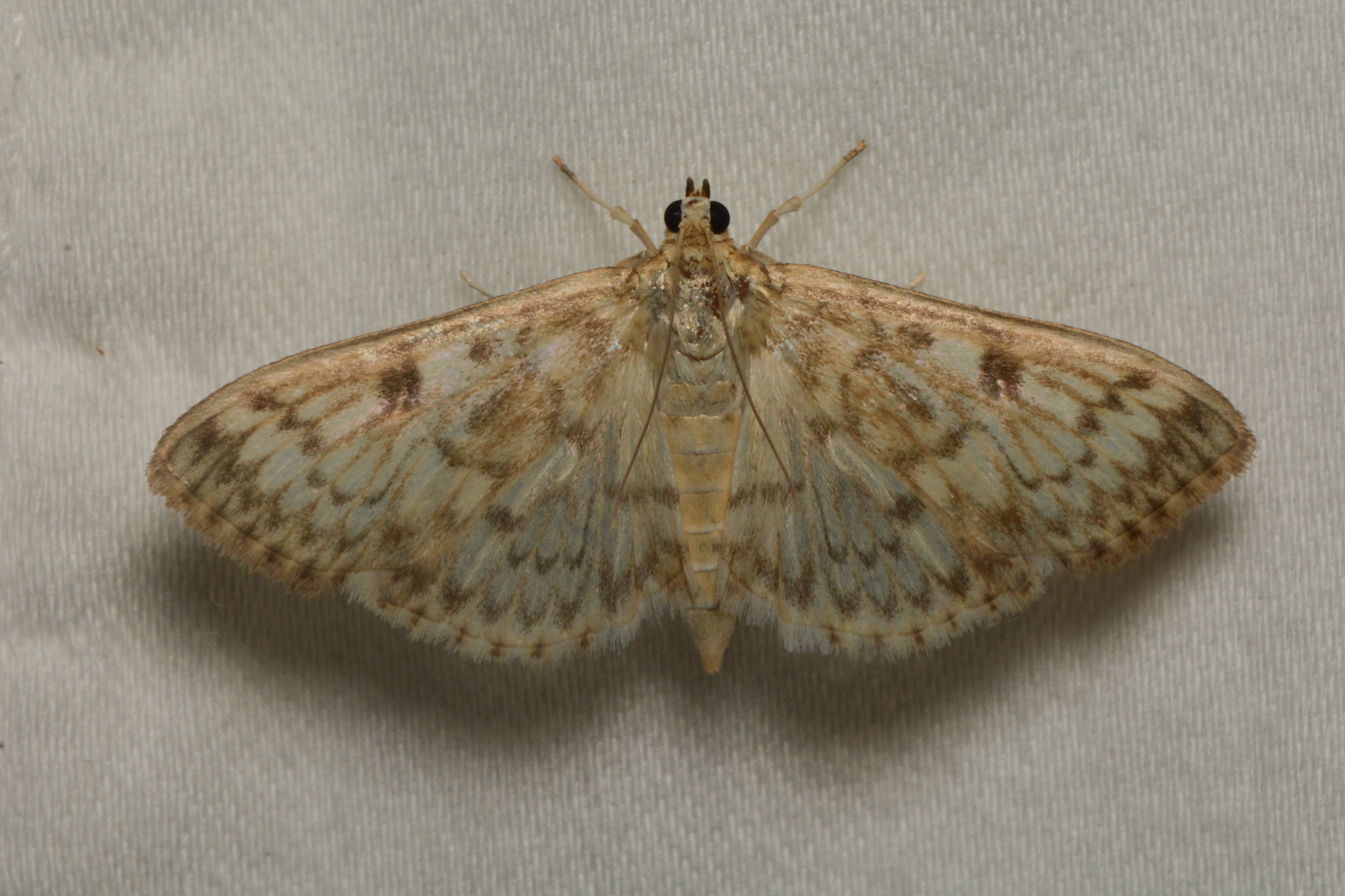
- Male

Scientific classification
- Kingdom: Animalia
- Phylum: Arthropoda
- Clade: Pancrustacea
- Class: Insecta
- Order: Lepidoptera
- Family: Crambidae
- Genus: Herpetogramma
- Species: H. aquilonalis

Binomial name
- Herpetogramma aquilonalis Handfield and Handfield. 2021

= Herpetogramma aquilonalis =

Species of moth

Herpetogramma aquilonalis is a species of pearl moth in the family Crambidae. Their wingspan is, on average, 23-27 mm and are generally white with grey or brown markings.

== Distribution and habitat ==
Herpetogramma aquilonalis, in Canada, can be found from British Columbia to Newfoundland and Labrador and south. In the United States it can be found around Washington and California, and even more so from New York to Georgia -- predominantly in the Appalachian Mountains. It occurs in boreal habitats.

== Ecology ==
Larvae are leaf rollers of numerous plants.

== Sexual Dimorphism ==
Herpetogramma aquilonalis males usually have longer wings and have darker markings than females, and have gray setae dorsally near the thorax. Females are often smaller with the tip of their forewings more square than males.

== Flight period ==
Adults are on flight from the middle of June to the middle of September, peaking in mid-July to the start of August. They are the only Canadian species in their genus to have a second generation during long summers.

== Etymology ==
"aquilonalis" comes from the Latin "aquilo" for "northern wind," which refers to the species' transcontinental northern distribution.
