= Herpetogramma decora =

Scientific classification
- Domain: Eukaryota
- Kingdom: Animalia
- Phylum: Arthropoda
- Class: Insecta
- Order: Lepidoptera
- Family: Crambidae
- Genus: Herpetogramma
- Species: H. decora

Binomial name
- Herpetogramma decora (Dyar, 1914)

Synonyms
- Pilocrocis decora Dyar, 1914

Species of moth

Herpetogramma decora is a species of moth in the family Crambidae. It was described by Harrison Gray Dyar Jr. in 1914. It is found in Panama.
