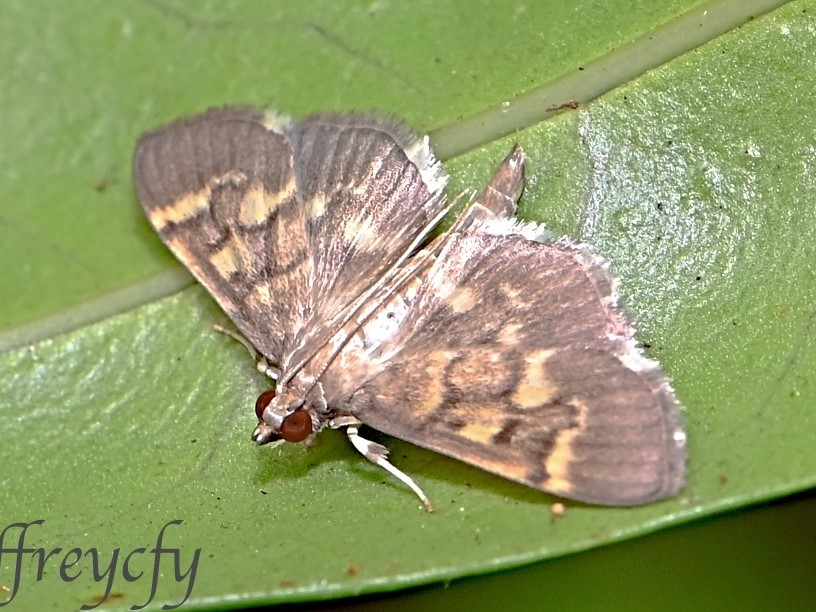

Scientific classification
- Kingdom: Animalia
- Phylum: Arthropoda
- Class: Insecta
- Order: Lepidoptera
- Family: Crambidae
- Genus: Herpetogramma
- Species: H. pseudomagna

Binomial name
- Herpetogramma pseudomagna Yamanaka, 1976

= Herpetogramma pseudomagna =

Species of moth

Herpetogramma pseudomagna is a species of moth in the family Crambidae. It was described by Hiroshi Yamanaka in 1976. It is found in Japan and China.

The wingspan is 27–29 mm.
