= Herpetogramma holophaea =

Scientific classification
- Kingdom: Animalia
- Phylum: Arthropoda
- Class: Insecta
- Order: Lepidoptera
- Family: Crambidae
- Genus: Herpetogramma
- Species: H. holophaea

Binomial name
- Herpetogramma holophaea (Hampson, 1899)

Synonyms
- Nacoleia holophaea Hampson, 1899

Species of moth

Herpetogramma holophaea is a species of moth in the family Crambidae. It was described by George Hampson in 1899. It is found in Australia, where it has been recorded from Queensland.
