= Herpetogramma albicilia =

Scientific classification
- Kingdom: Animalia
- Phylum: Arthropoda
- Class: Insecta
- Order: Lepidoptera
- Family: Crambidae
- Genus: Herpetogramma
- Species: H. albicilia

Binomial name
- Herpetogramma albicilia (Hampson, 1913)

Synonyms
- Pachyzancla albicilia Hampson, 1913

Species of moth

Herpetogramma albicilia is a species of moth in the family Crambidae. It was described by George Hampson in 1913. It is found in Peru.
