= Herpetogramma pallidalis =

Scientific classification
- Kingdom: Animalia
- Phylum: Arthropoda
- Class: Insecta
- Order: Lepidoptera
- Family: Crambidae
- Genus: Herpetogramma
- Species: H. pallidalis

Binomial name
- Herpetogramma pallidalis (Hampson, 1913)

Synonyms
- Pachyzancla pallidalis Hampson, 1913; Pachyzancla aethiopica Strand, 1916

Species of moth

Herpetogramma pallidalis is a species of moth in the family Crambidae. It was first described by George Hampson in 1913. It is found in Indonesia (Tanimbar Islands), Cameroon, Ghana, Nigeria, South Africa and Uganda.
