= Herpetogramma continualis =

Scientific classification
- Domain: Eukaryota
- Kingdom: Animalia
- Phylum: Arthropoda
- Class: Insecta
- Order: Lepidoptera
- Family: Crambidae
- Genus: Herpetogramma
- Species: H. continualis

Binomial name
- Herpetogramma continualis J. C. Shaffer & Munroe, 2007

Species of moth

Herpetogramma continualis is a species of moth in the family Crambidae. It was described by Jay C. Shaffer and Eugene G. Munroe in 2007. It is found on the Seychelles, where it has been recorded from Aldabra.
