= Herpetogramma verminalis =

Scientific classification
- Kingdom: Animalia
- Phylum: Arthropoda
- Clade: Pancrustacea
- Class: Insecta
- Order: Lepidoptera
- Family: Crambidae
- Genus: Herpetogramma
- Species: H. verminalis

Binomial name
- Herpetogramma verminalis (Guenée, 1854)

Synonyms
- Botys verminalis Guenée, 1854

Species of moth

Herpetogramma verminalis is a species of moth in the family Crambidae. It was described by French entomologist Achille Guenée in 1854. It is found in Sierra Leone.
