= Herpetogramma dilatatipes =

Scientific classification
- Kingdom: Animalia
- Phylum: Arthropoda
- Class: Insecta
- Order: Lepidoptera
- Family: Crambidae
- Genus: Herpetogramma
- Species: H. dilatatipes

Binomial name
- Herpetogramma dilatatipes (Walker, 1866)

Synonyms
- Botys dilatatipes Walker, 1866; Pantoeocome deformis Warren, 1896

Species of moth

Herpetogramma dilatatipes is a species of moth in the family Crambidae. It was described by Francis Walker in 1866. It is found in Australia and Indonesia (Sumbawa, Mysol, Tenimber).
