= Herpetogramma agavealis =

Scientific classification
- Kingdom: Animalia
- Phylum: Arthropoda
- Class: Insecta
- Order: Lepidoptera
- Family: Crambidae
- Genus: Herpetogramma
- Species: H. agavealis

Binomial name
- Herpetogramma agavealis (Walker, 1859)

Synonyms
- Botys agavealis Walker, 1859

Species of moth

Herpetogramma agavealis is a species of moth in the family Crambidae. It was described by Francis Walker in 1859. It is found in the Dominican Republic, Jamaica and Costa Rica.
