= Herpetogramma albivitta =

Scientific classification
- Kingdom: Animalia
- Phylum: Arthropoda
- Class: Insecta
- Order: Lepidoptera
- Family: Crambidae
- Genus: Herpetogramma
- Species: H. albivitta

Binomial name
- Herpetogramma albivitta (Hampson, 1913)

Synonyms
- Pachyzancla albivitta Hampson, 1913; Pyrausta haemaproctis Hampson, 1913

Species of moth

Herpetogramma albivitta is a species of moth in the family Crambidae. It was described by George Hampson in 1913. It is found in Peru.
