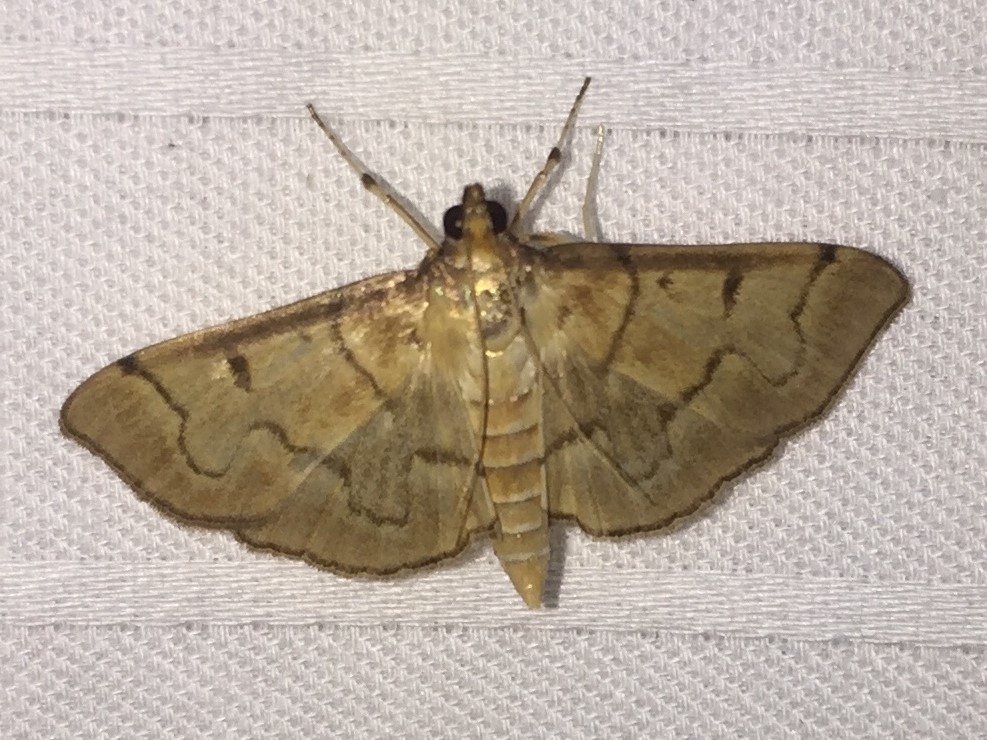

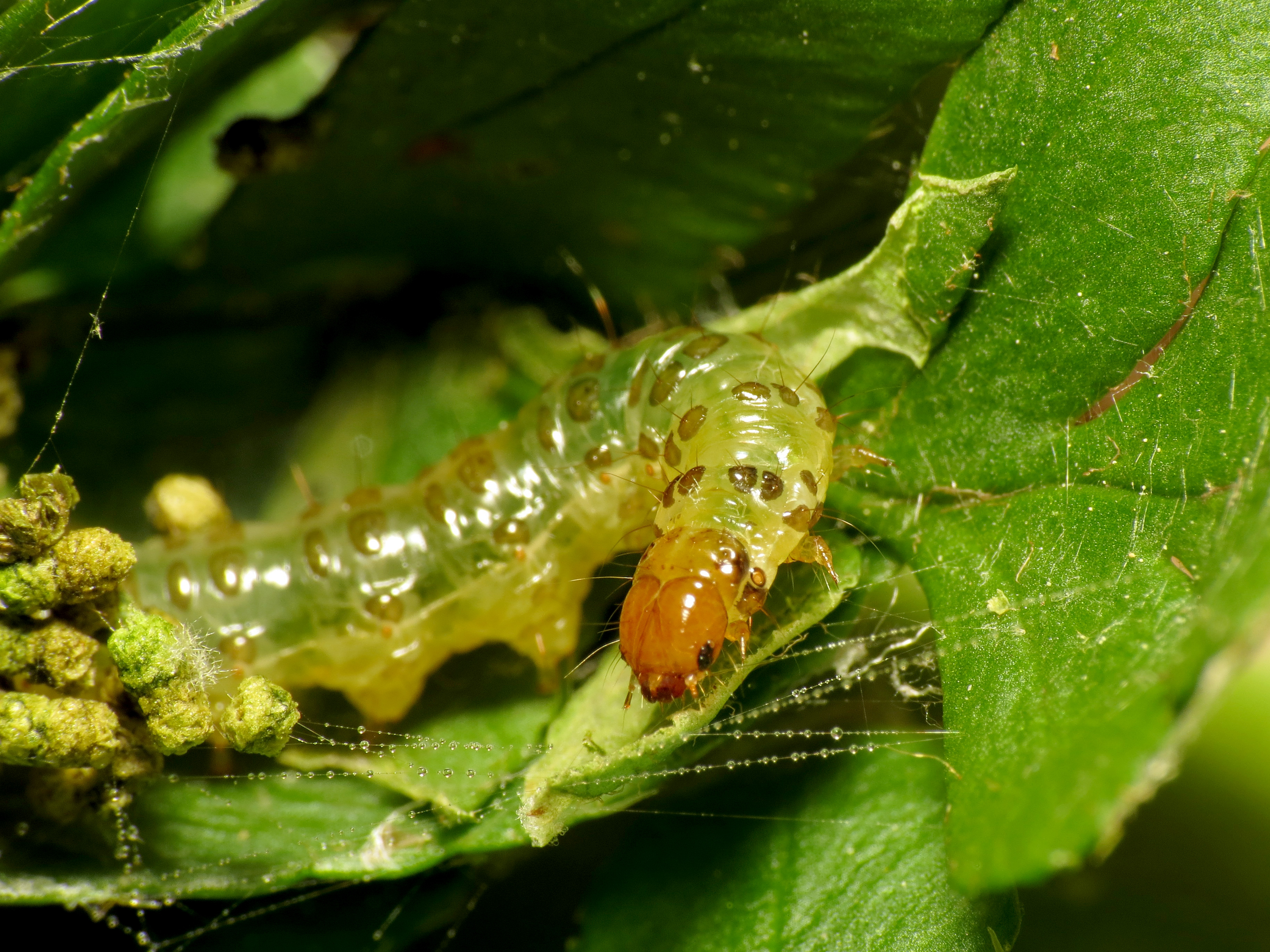
- Adult (top) and larva (bottom)

Scientific classification
- Kingdom: Animalia
- Phylum: Arthropoda
- Class: Insecta
- Order: Lepidoptera
- Family: Crambidae
- Genus: Herpetogramma
- Species: H. theseusalis

Binomial name
- Herpetogramma theseusalis (Walker, 1859)

Synonyms
- Botys theseusalis Walker, 1859; Botis feudalis Grote, 1875

= Herpetogramma theseusalis =

Species of moth

Herpetogramma theseusalis is a species of moth in the family Crambidae. It was described by Francis Walker in 1859. It is found in North America, where it has been recorded from Alabama, Florida, Maine, Maryland, North Carolina, Quebec, South Carolina, Texas and Virginia.

Adults have been recorded on wing from April to September.

The larvae feed on Lorinseria areolata. They roll the tips of the leaves, forming a round cocoon. The caterpillar is green.
