= Herpetogramma straminealis =

Scientific classification
- Domain: Eukaryota
- Kingdom: Animalia
- Phylum: Arthropoda
- Class: Insecta
- Order: Lepidoptera
- Family: Crambidae
- Genus: Herpetogramma
- Species: H. straminealis

Binomial name
- Herpetogramma straminealis (Dognin, 1905)

Synonyms
- Pachyzancla straminealis Dognin, 1905

Species of moth

Herpetogramma straminealis is a species of moth in the family Crambidae. It was described by Paul Dognin in 1905. It is found in Loja Province, Ecuador.
