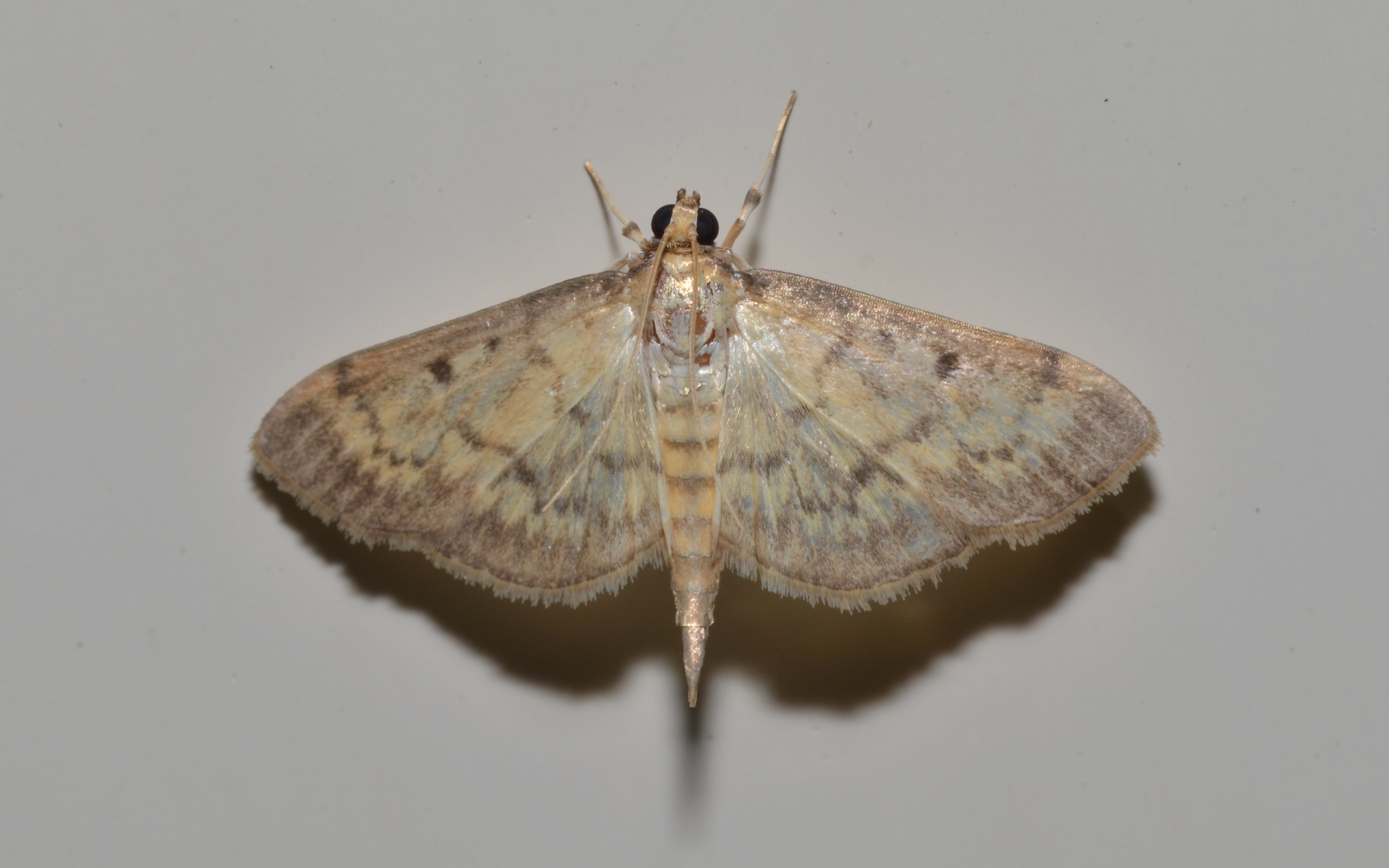
- Herpetogramma fluctuosalis

Scientific classification
- Kingdom: Animalia
- Phylum: Arthropoda
- Clade: Pancrustacea
- Class: Insecta
- Order: Lepidoptera
- Family: Crambidae
- Tribe: Herpetogrammatini
- Genus: Herpetogramma; Lederer, 1863

Synonyms
- Acharana Moore, 1885; Coremataria Amsel, 1956; Culcitaria Amsel, 1957; Macrobotys Munroe, 1950; Pachyzancla Meyrick, 1884; Pantoeocome Warren, 1896; Piloptila Swinhoe, 1894; Ptiloptila Hampson, 1899; Stenomelas Hampson, 1912; Stenomeles Warren, 1892

= Herpetogramma =

Genus of moths

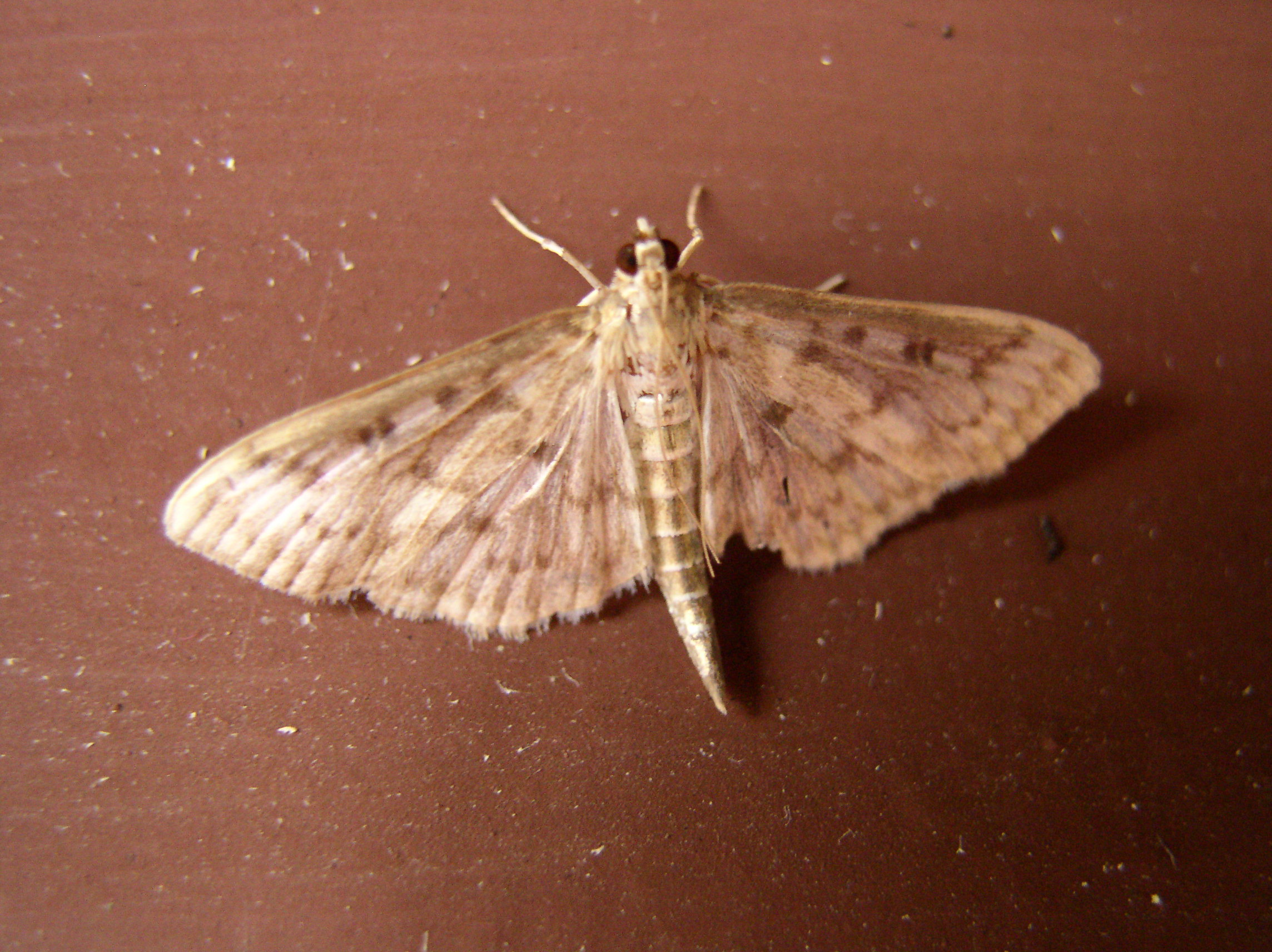
Herpetogramma abdominalis

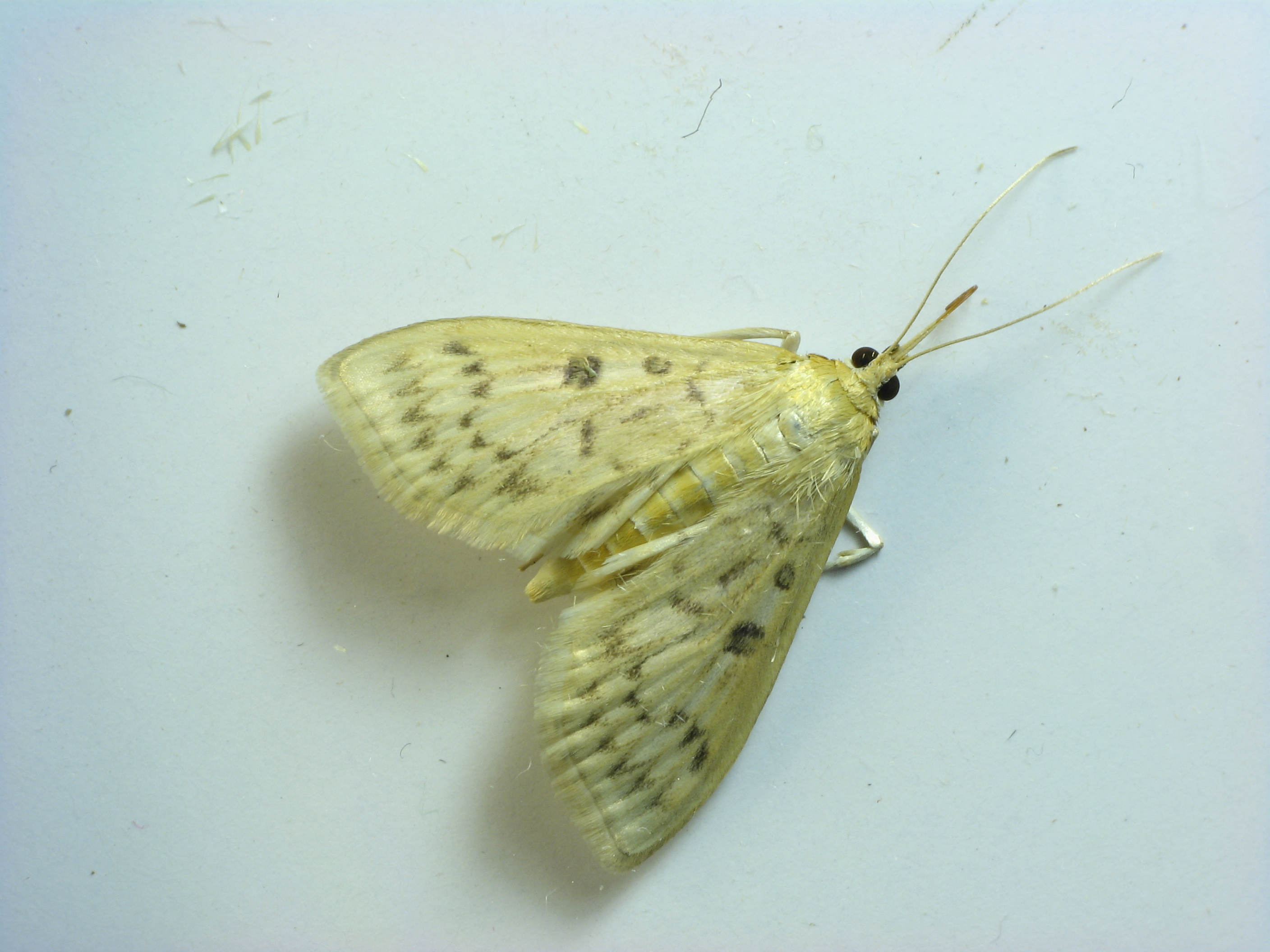
Herpetogramma sp.

Herpetogramma is a genus of moths in the family Crambidae described by Julius Lederer in 1863. It currently comprises 106 species that are found in North America, Eurasia, Australia, New Zealand, Central and South America. Of the few species where host plants are known, the larvae mostly feed on grasses.

== Species ==
- Herpetogramma abdominalis (Zeller, 1872)
- Herpetogramma acyptera (Hampson, 1899)
- Herpetogramma aeglealis (Walker, 1859)
- Herpetogramma agavealis (Walker, 1859)
- Herpetogramma albicilia (Hampson, 1913)
- Herpetogramma albipennis (Inoue, 2000)
- Herpetogramma albivitta (Hampson, 1913)
- Herpetogramma ambitalis (Rebel, 1924)
- Herpetogramma amselalis (Munroe, 1995)
- Herpetogramma antillalis (Schaus, 1920)
- Herpetogramma aquilonalis (Handfield and Handfield, 2021)
- Herpetogramma atrirenalis (Hampson, 1912)
- Herpetogramma atropunctalis (Mabille, 1900)
- Herpetogramma barbipalpalis (Hampson, 1918)
- Herpetogramma basalis (Walker, 1866)
- Herpetogramma bermudalis (Dyar, 1915)
- Herpetogramma biconvexa (Wan, Lu & Du in Lu, Wan & Du, 2019)
- Herpetogramma bipunctalis (Fabricius, 1794)
- Herpetogramma brachyacantha (Lu, Wan & Du, 2019)
- Herpetogramma brunnealis (Hampson, 1913)
- Herpetogramma centrostrigalis (Stephens, 1934)
- Herpetogramma cervinicosta (Hampson, 1918)
- Herpetogramma circumflexalis (Guenée, 1854)
- Herpetogramma cleoropa (Meyrick, 1934)
- Herpetogramma continualis (J. C. Shaffer & Munroe, 2007)
- Herpetogramma coptobasalis (Hampson, 1899)
- Herpetogramma cora (Dyar, 1914)
- Herpetogramma couteneyi (Guillermet, 2008)
- Herpetogramma cynaralis (Walker, 1859)
- Herpetogramma debressyi (Guillermet, 2008)
- Herpetogramma decora (Dyar, 1914)
- Herpetogramma desmioides (Hampson, 1899)
- Herpetogramma dilatatipes (Walker, 1866)
- Herpetogramma elongalis (Warren, 1892)
- Herpetogramma emphatica (Dyar, 1926)
- Herpetogramma exculta (T. P. Lucas, 1892)
- Herpetogramma fascinalis (Amsel, 1950)
- Herpetogramma fimbrialis (Dognin, 1904)
- Herpetogramma fluctuosalis (Lederer, 1863)
- Herpetogramma fraxinalis (Handfield & Handfield, 2021)
- Herpetogramma fuscescens (Warren, 1892)
- Herpetogramma gnamptoceralis (Hampson, 1917)
- Herpetogramma grisealis (Snellen, 1875)
- Herpetogramma griseolineata (Mabille, 1900)
- Herpetogramma hipponalis (Walker, 1859)
- Herpetogramma hirsuta (Dognin, 1903)
- Herpetogramma holochrysis (Hampson, 1913)
- Herpetogramma holophaea (Hampson, 1899)
- Herpetogramma hoozana (Strand, 1918)
- Herpetogramma infuscalis (Guenée, 1854)
- Herpetogramma innotalis (Hampson, 1899)
- Herpetogramma juba (J. C. Shaffer & Munroe, 2007)
- Herpetogramma junctalis (Dyar, 1910)
- Herpetogramma latifuscalis (Hampson, 1899)
- Herpetogramma licarsisalis (Walker, 1859)
- Herpetogramma longispina (Wan, Lu & Du in Lu, Wan & Du, 2019)
- Herpetogramma luctuosalis (Guenée, 1854)
- Herpetogramma lulalis (Strand, 1918)
- Herpetogramma magna (Butler, 1879)
- Herpetogramma maledicta (Warren, 1892)
- Herpetogramma mellealis (Swinhoe, 1890)
- Herpetogramma mimeticalis (E. Hering, 1901)
- Herpetogramma minoralis (Warren, 1892)
- Herpetogramma moderatalis (Christoph, 1881)
- Herpetogramma mutualis (Zeller, 1852)
- Herpetogramma nigricornalis (Swinhoe, 1894)
- Herpetogramma nigripalpis (Hampson, 1913)
- Herpetogramma obscurior (Munroe, 1963)
- Herpetogramma ochrimaculalis (South in Leech & South, 1901)
- Herpetogramma ochrotinctalis (Inoue, 1982)
- Herpetogramma okamotoi (Yamanaka, 1976)
- Herpetogramma olivescens (Warren, 1892)
- Herpetogramma omphalobasis (Hampson, 1899)
- Herpetogramma ottonalis (Semper, 1899)
- Herpetogramma pachycera (Hampson, 1899)
- Herpetogramma pacificalis (Hampson, 1912)
- Herpetogramma pallidalis (Hampson, 1913)
- Herpetogramma pertextalis (Lederer, 1863)
- Herpetogramma phaeopteralis (Guenée, 1854)
- Herpetogramma phthorosticta (Meyrick, 1929)
- Herpetogramma piasusalis (Walker, 1859)
- Herpetogramma platycapna (Meyrick, 1897)
- Herpetogramma pseudomagna (Yamanaka, 1976)
- Herpetogramma retrorsalis (Hampson, 1918)
- Herpetogramma rudis (Warren, 1892)
- Herpetogramma salbialis (Hampson, 1899)
- Herpetogramma schausi (Munroe, 1995)
- Herpetogramma semilaniata (Hampson, 1895)
- Herpetogramma servalis (Lederer, 1863)
- Herpetogramma sphingealis (Handfield and Handfield, 2011)
- Herpetogramma straminea (Hampson, 1913)
- Herpetogramma straminealis (Dognin, 1905)
- Herpetogramma stramineata (Hampson, 1912)
- Herpetogramma stultalis (Walker, 1859)
- Herpetogramma subalbescens (Swinhoe, 1894)
- Herpetogramma submarginalis (Swinhoe, 1901)
- Herpetogramma subnitens (Schaus, 1920)
- Herpetogramma tenella (Hampson, 1897)
- Herpetogramma theseusalis (Walker, 1859)
- Herpetogramma thestealis (Walker, 1859)
- Herpetogramma tominagai (Yamanaka, 2003)
- Herpetogramma vacheri (Guillermet, 2008)
- Herpetogramma verminalis (Guenée, 1854)
- Herpetogramma viraktamathi (Murthy et al., 2025)
- Herpetogramma yaeyamense (Yamanaka, 2003)
- Herpetogramma zophosticta (Turner, 1915)

== Former Species ==
- Herpetogramma mahensis – now Zebronia mahensis (T. B. Fletcher, 1910)
- Herpetogramma palealis – now Sitochroa palealis (Denis & Schiffermüller, 1775)
