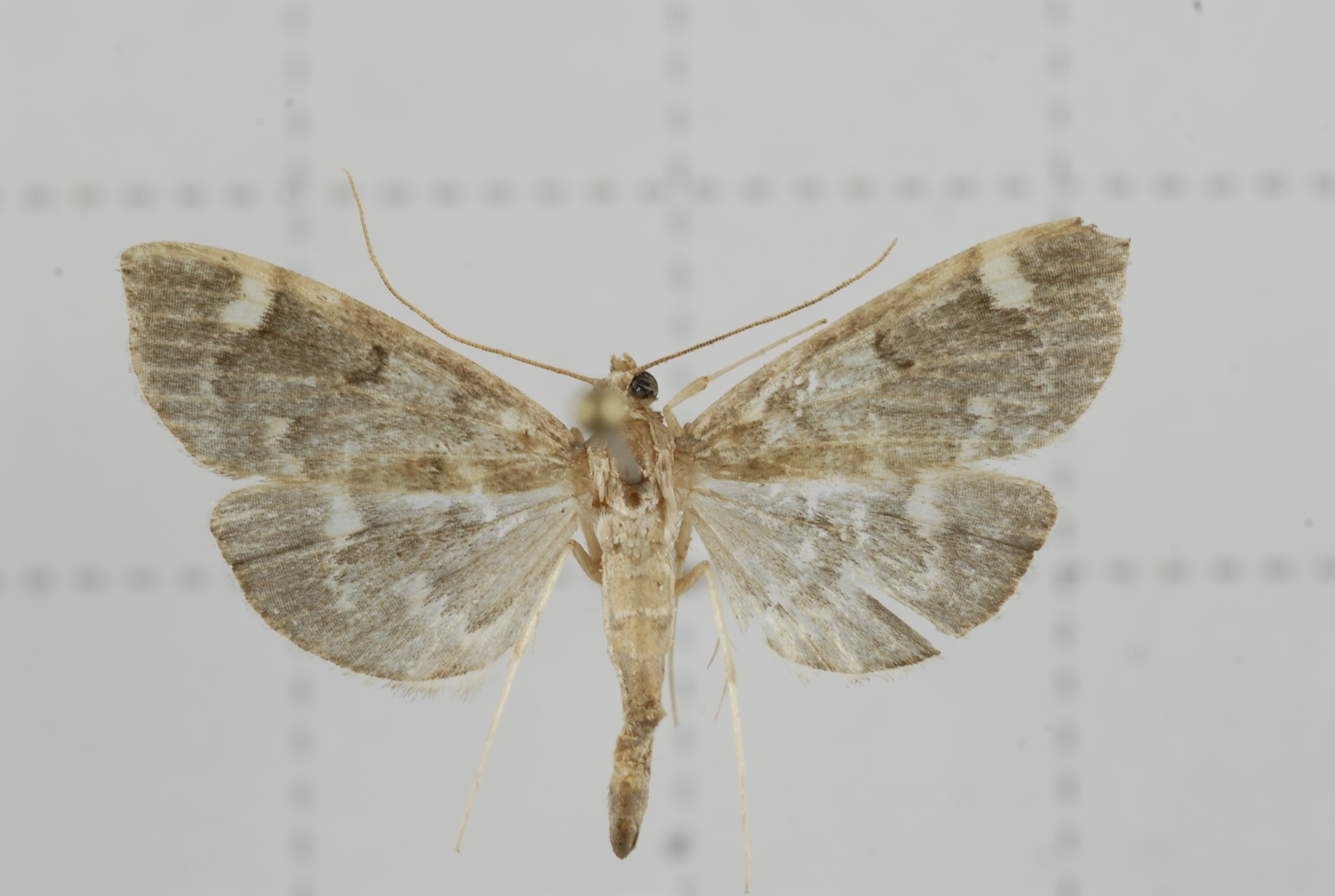

Scientific classification
- Domain: Eukaryota
- Kingdom: Animalia
- Phylum: Arthropoda
- Class: Insecta
- Order: Lepidoptera
- Family: Crambidae
- Genus: Herpetogramma
- Species: H. magna

Binomial name
- Herpetogramma magna (Butler, 1879)

Synonyms
- Samea magna Butler, 1879

= Herpetogramma magna =

Species of moth

Herpetogramma magna is a species of moth in the family Crambidae. It was described by Arthur Gardiner Butler in 1879. It is found in Japan, Russia and Taiwan.
