= Herpetogramma vacheri =

Scientific classification
- Domain: Eukaryota
- Kingdom: Animalia
- Phylum: Arthropoda
- Class: Insecta
- Order: Lepidoptera
- Family: Crambidae
- Genus: Herpetogramma
- Species: H. vacheri

Binomial name
- Herpetogramma vacheri Guillermet, 2008

Species of moth

Herpetogramma vacheri is a species of moth in the family Crambidae. It was described by Christian Guillermet in 2008. It is found on Réunion.
