= Herpetogramma mimeticalis =

Scientific classification
- Domain: Eukaryota
- Kingdom: Animalia
- Phylum: Arthropoda
- Class: Insecta
- Order: Lepidoptera
- Family: Crambidae
- Genus: Herpetogramma
- Species: H. mimeticalis

Binomial name
- Herpetogramma mimeticalis (E. Hering, 1901)

Synonyms
- Pachyzancla mimeticalis E. Hering, 1901

Species of moth

Herpetogramma mimeticalis is a species of moth in the family Crambidae. It was described by Hering in 1901. It is found on Sumatra.
