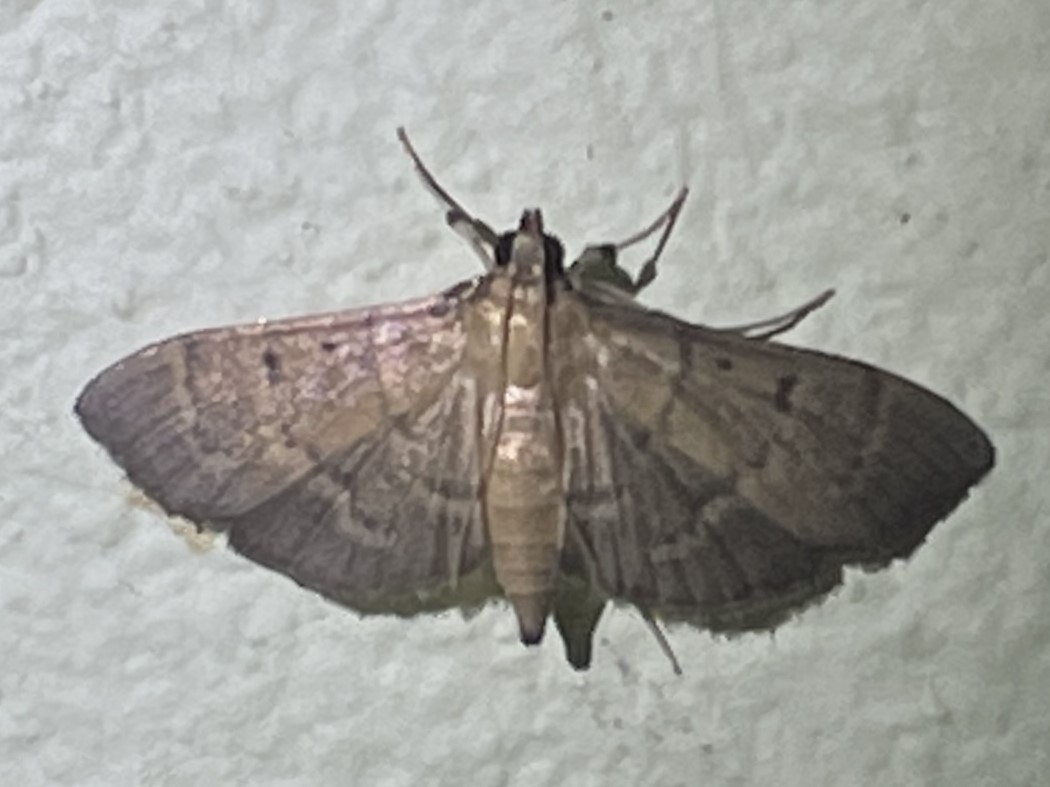

Scientific classification
- Kingdom: Animalia
- Phylum: Arthropoda
- Clade: Pancrustacea
- Class: Insecta
- Order: Lepidoptera
- Family: Crambidae
- Genus: Herpetogramma
- Species: H. semilaniata

Binomial name
- Herpetogramma semilaniata (Hampson, 1895)

Synonyms
- Pachyzancla semilaniata Hampson, 1895

= Herpetogramma semilaniata =

Species of moth

Herpetogramma semilaniata is a species of moth in the family Crambidae. It was described by George Hampson in 1895. It is found on St. Vincent and in Cuba and Costa Rica.
