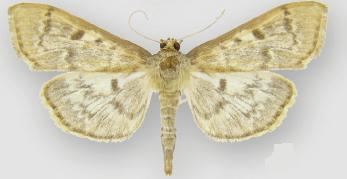
- Male of the typical form
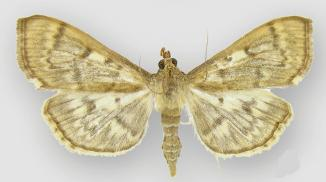
- Female of the typical form

Scientific classification
- Kingdom: Animalia
- Phylum: Arthropoda
- Class: Insecta
- Order: Lepidoptera
- Family: Crambidae
- Genus: Herpetogramma
- Species: H. aeglealis

Binomial name
- Herpetogramma aeglealis (Walker, 1859)

Synonyms
- Botys aeglealis Walker, 1859; Botis quinquelinealis Grote, 1875

= Herpetogramma aeglealis =

Species of moth

Herpetogramma aeglealis, commonly known as the serpentine webworm moth, is a species of moth in the family Crambidae. It was first described by Francis Walker in 1859 and is found in eastern North America.

== Description ==
The wingspan is 29–34 mm for males and 27–31 mm for females. Adults are sexually dimorphic. The hindwings of the males are dirty white with dark grey shading on the discal spot, wing veins, subterminal area and an irregular but contrasting postmedial line. Females have a golden hue. There are two forms, a darker and a typical form.

== Behaviour and ecology ==
The larvae have been reared on a variety of herbaceous plants including ragwort, ferns, goldenrod, raspberry, pokeweed, wild ginger, and mayapple.

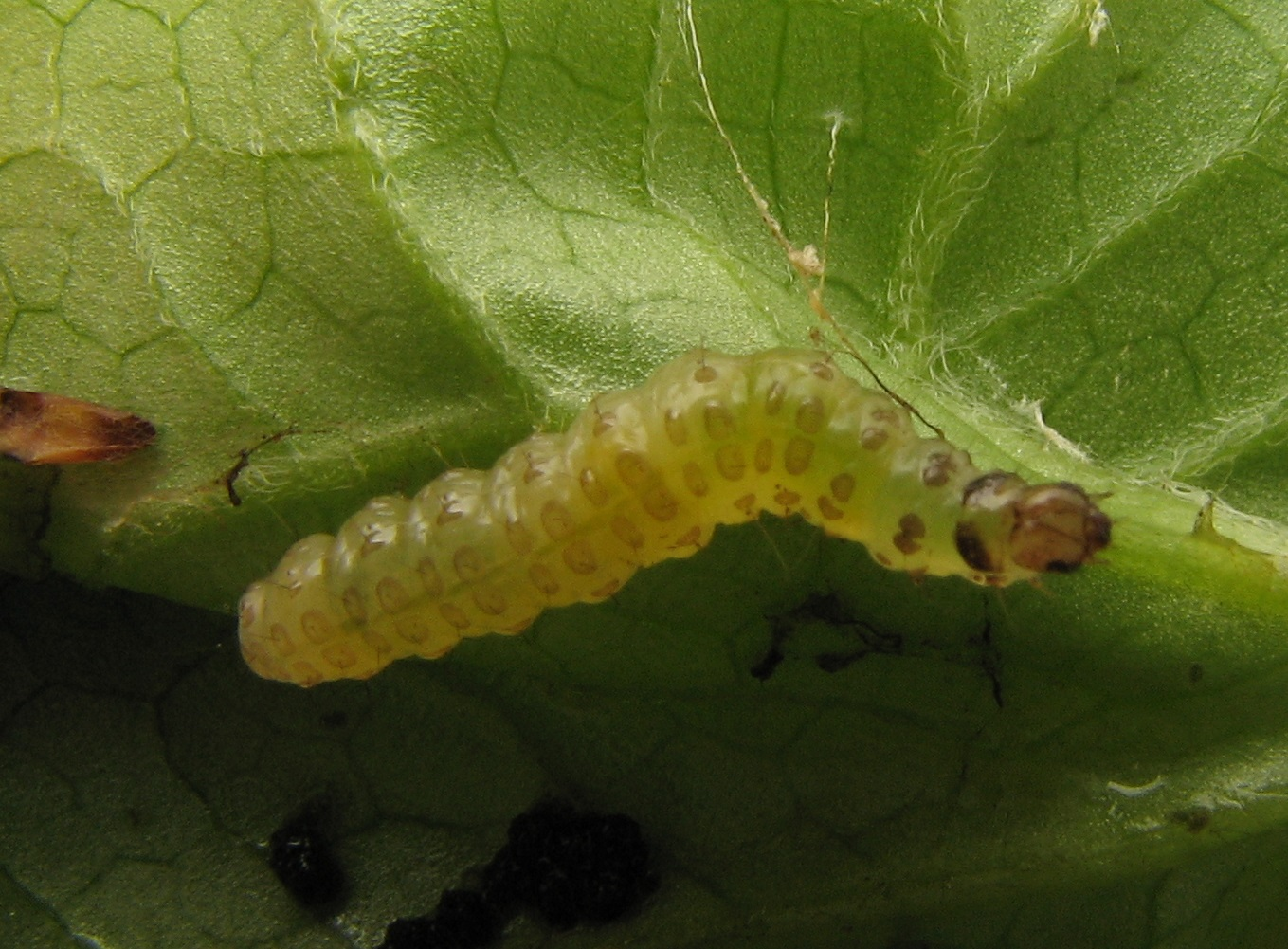
Early instar caterpillar (raised in wild ginger)

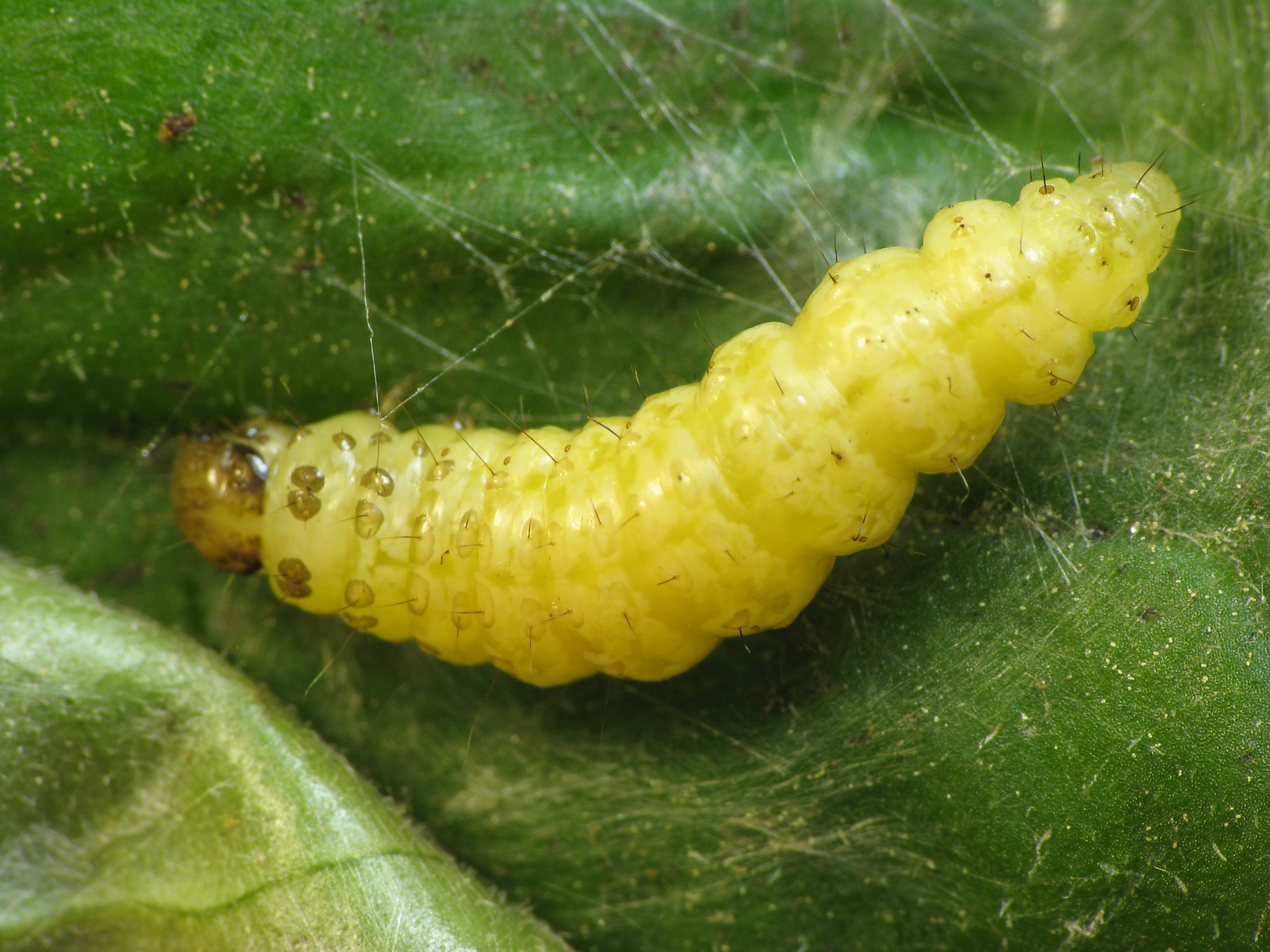
Later instar caterpillar

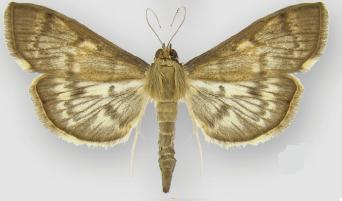
Male of the dark form

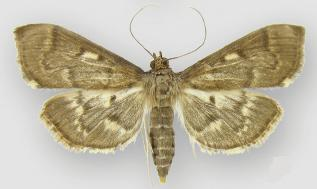
Female of the dark form
