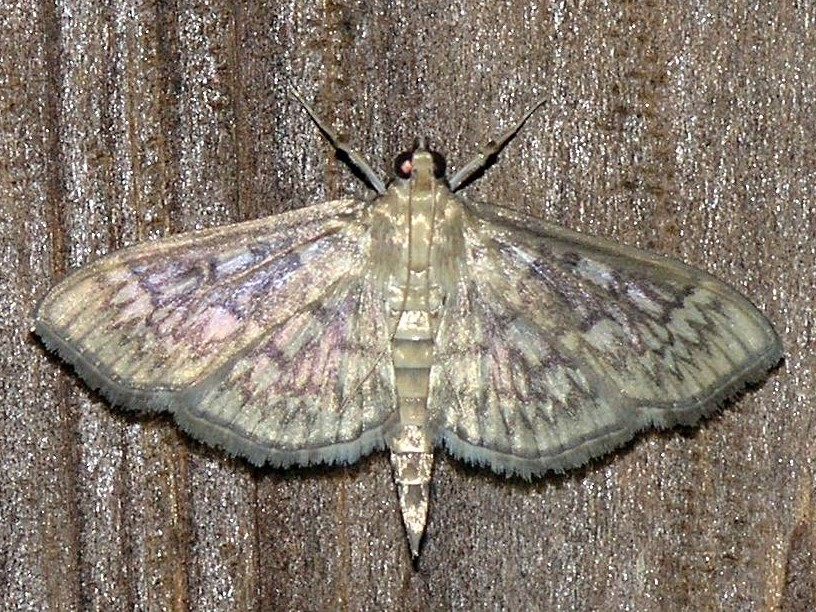

Scientific classification
- Kingdom: Animalia
- Phylum: Arthropoda
- Clade: Pancrustacea
- Class: Insecta
- Order: Lepidoptera
- Family: Crambidae
- Genus: Herpetogramma
- Species: H. pertextalis

Binomial name
- Herpetogramma pertextalis (Lederer, 1863)

Synonyms
- Botys pertextalis Lederer, 1863; Botis gentilis Grote, 1873; Herpetogramma gentilis (Grote, 1873); Botis thesealis Zeller, 1872

= Herpetogramma pertextalis =

Species of moth

Herpetogramma pertextalis, commonly known as the bold-feathered grass moth, is a species of moth of the family Crambidae. It was first described by Julius Lederer in 1863 and is found in North America.

== Description ==
Adult bold-feathered grass moth males have a wingspan of about 21.5–23.0 mm, and the females 23–24 mm. They hold their wings open at rest, exposing both the forewings and hindwings. All four wings are whitish-tan and iridescent with a series of jagged lines. A dark brown line is present at the lowermost margin of all four wings.

== Range and Habitat ==
This species is native to North America and is most commonly observed in open grassy areas such as fields, lawns and pastures.

== Ecology ==
H. pertextalis larvae feed on the leaves of Clethra alnifolia.
