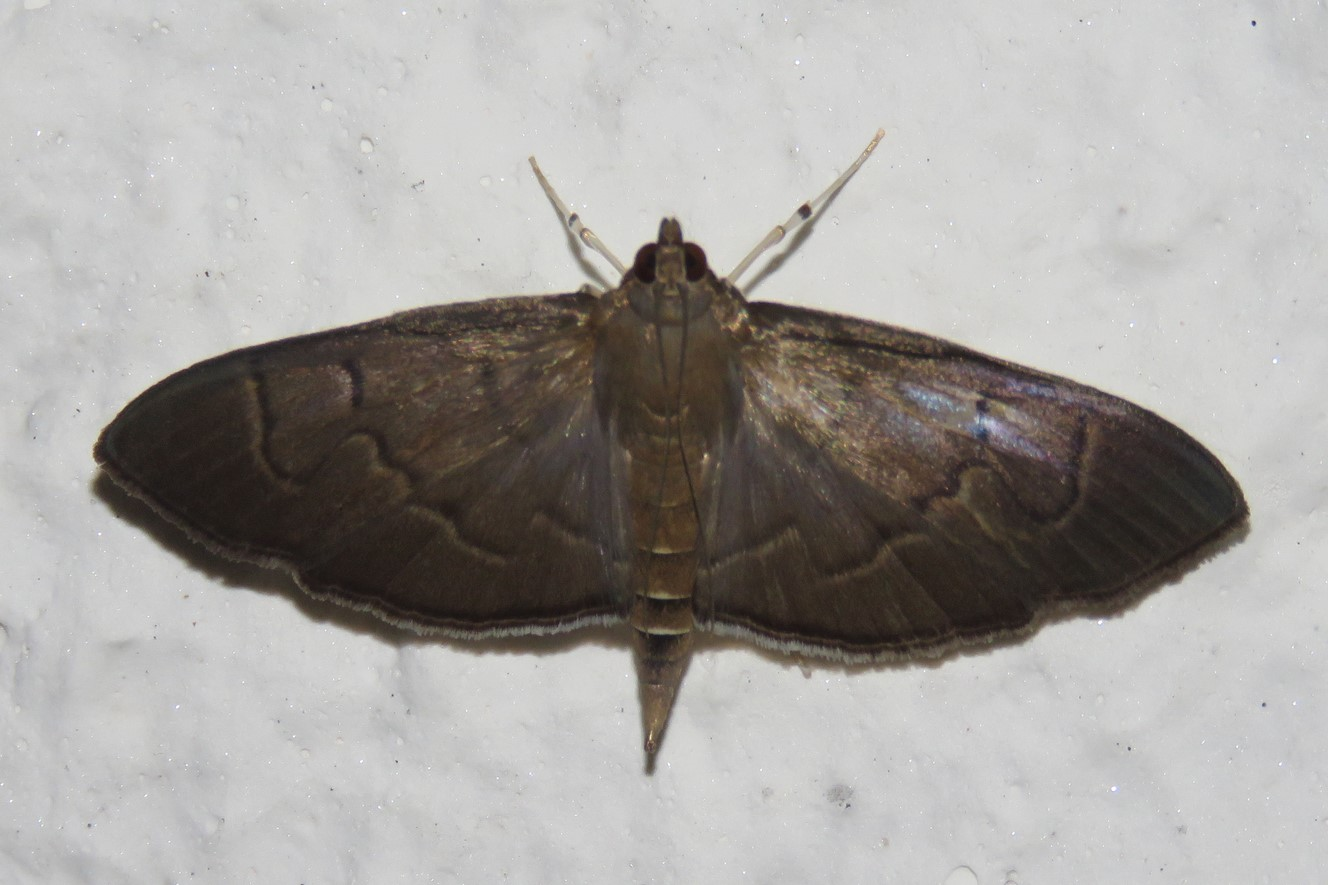

Scientific classification
- Kingdom: Animalia
- Phylum: Arthropoda
- Clade: Pancrustacea
- Class: Insecta
- Order: Lepidoptera
- Family: Crambidae
- Genus: Herpetogramma
- Species: H. infuscalis

Binomial name
- Herpetogramma infuscalis (Guenée, 1854)

Synonyms
- Botys infuscalis Guenée, 1854; Botys pruinalis Lederer, 1863

= Herpetogramma infuscalis =

Species of moth

Herpetogramma infuscalis is a species of moth in the family Crambidae. It was first described by Achille Guenée in 1854. It is found in Brazil.
