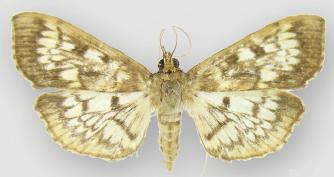
- Male (top) and female (bottom)

Scientific classification
- Kingdom: Animalia
- Phylum: Arthropoda
- Class: Insecta
- Order: Lepidoptera
- Family: Crambidae
- Genus: Herpetogramma
- Species: H. thestealis

Binomial name
- Herpetogramma thestealis (Walker, 1859)

Synonyms
- Botys thestealis Walker, 1859; Botis gulosalis Hulst, 1886; Botis magistralis Grote, 1873

= Herpetogramma thestealis =

Species of moth

Herpetogramma thestealis is a species of moth of the family Crambidae. It is found in most of North America.

The wingspan is 29–38 mm. Adults are sexually dimorphic.

The larvae feed on various woody plants, including basswood, hazel, Carolina silverbell and spikenard.
