= Herpetogramma subnitens =

Scientific classification
- Domain: Eukaryota
- Kingdom: Animalia
- Phylum: Arthropoda
- Class: Insecta
- Order: Lepidoptera
- Family: Crambidae
- Genus: Herpetogramma
- Species: H. subnitens

Binomial name
- Herpetogramma subnitens (Schaus, 1920)

Synonyms
- Psara subnitens Schaus, 1920; Psara subnitalis Munroe, 1995

Species of moth

Herpetogramma subnitens is a moth in the family Crambidae. It was described by Schaus in 1920. It is found in Trinidad and French Guiana.
