= Herpetogramma okamotoi =

Scientific classification
- Domain: Eukaryota
- Kingdom: Animalia
- Phylum: Arthropoda
- Class: Insecta
- Order: Lepidoptera
- Family: Crambidae
- Genus: Herpetogramma
- Species: H. okamotoi

Binomial name
- Herpetogramma okamotoi Yamanaka, 1976

Species of moth

Herpetogramma okamotoi is a species of moth in the family Crambidae. It was described by Hiroshi Yamanaka in 1976. It is found on the Japanese islands of Honshu and Shikoku.

The larvae feed on the leaves Pteris multifida and Microlepia strigosa.
