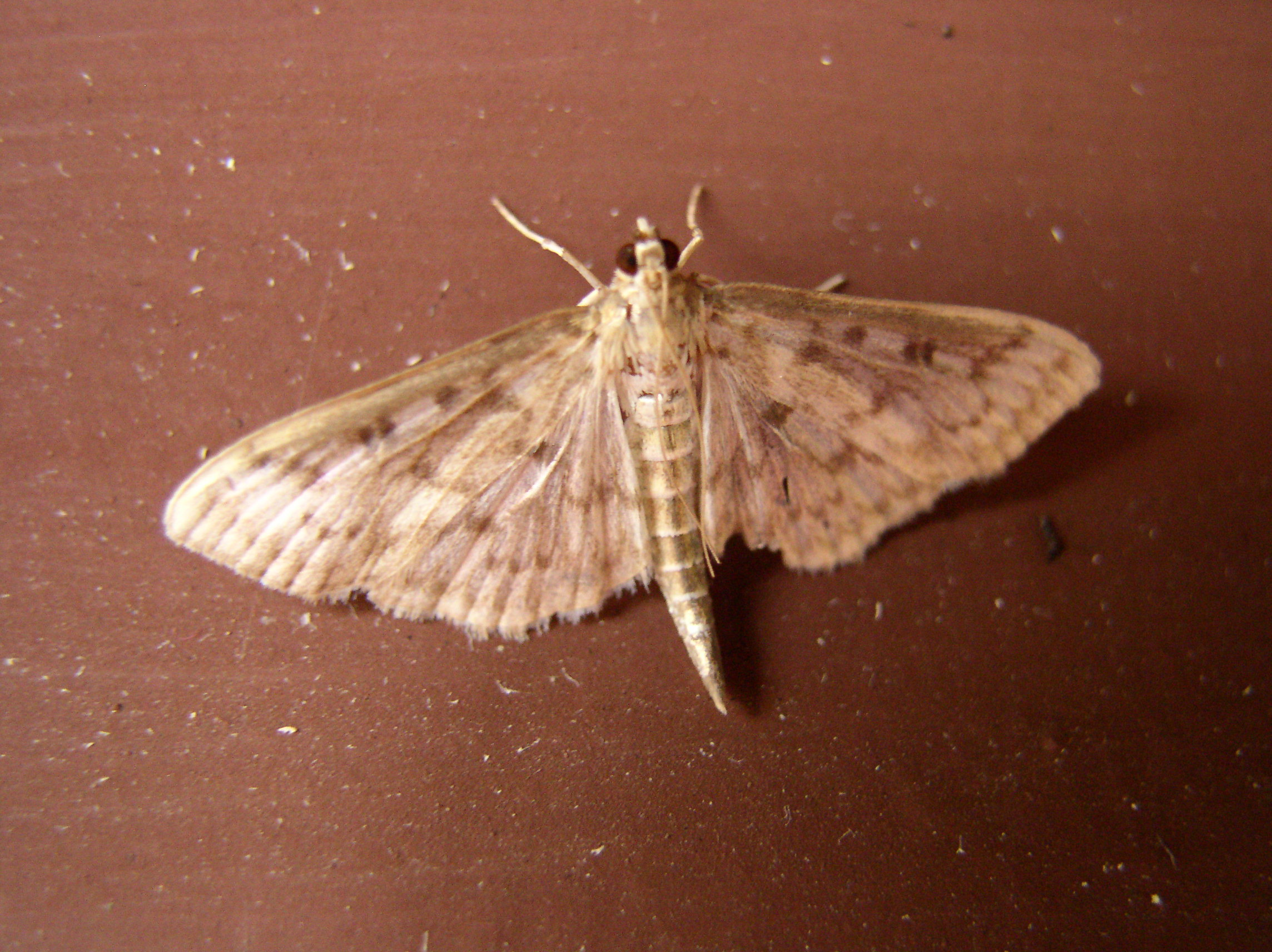
- Specimen from Rock Harbor, Isle Royale National Park, MI

Scientific classification
- Kingdom: Animalia
- Phylum: Arthropoda
- Clade: Pancrustacea
- Class: Insecta
- Order: Lepidoptera
- Family: Crambidae
- Genus: Herpetogramma
- Species: H. abdominalis

Binomial name
- Herpetogramma abdominalis (Zeller, 1872)

Synonyms
- Botys abdominalis Zeller, 1872; Botis fissalis Grote, 1881

= Herpetogramma abdominalis =

Species of moth

Herpetogramma abdominalis is a species of moth in the family Crambidae. It was described by Zeller in 1872. It is found in North America, where it has been recorded from Washington state, east to Nova Scotia, and south to Mississippi and North Carolina.

== Description ==
The wingspan is 22–35 mm. Adults usually have light orangish brown costa and a white ground colour. Adults are on wing from April to September.

== Behaviour and ecology ==
The larvae feed on Laportea canadensis.
