= Herpetogramma stramineata =

Scientific classification
- Kingdom: Animalia
- Phylum: Arthropoda
- Class: Insecta
- Order: Lepidoptera
- Family: Crambidae
- Genus: Herpetogramma
- Species: H. stramineata

Binomial name
- Herpetogramma stramineata (Hampson, 1912)

Synonyms
- Nacoleia stramineata Hampson, 1912; Blepharomastix vilialis Druce, 1895

Species of moth

Herpetogramma stramineata is a species of moth in the family Crambidae. It was described by George Hampson in 1912. It is found in Tabasco, Mexico.
