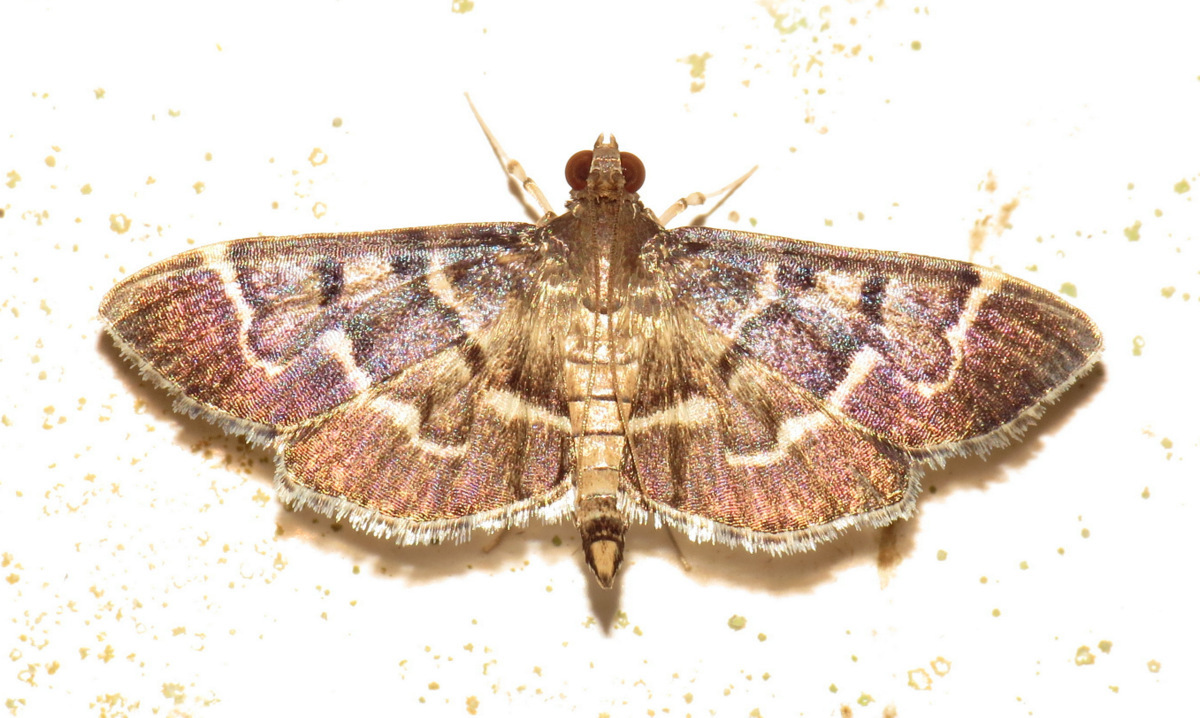

Scientific classification
- Kingdom: Animalia
- Phylum: Arthropoda
- Class: Insecta
- Order: Lepidoptera
- Family: Crambidae
- Genus: Herpetogramma
- Species: H. salbialis

Binomial name
- Herpetogramma salbialis (Hampson, 1899)

Synonyms
- Nacoleia salbialis Hampson, 1899

= Herpetogramma salbialis =

Species of moth

Herpetogramma salbialis is a species of moth in the family Crambidae. It was described by George Hampson in 1899. It is found in Veracruz, Mexico, Costa Rica and Honduras.
