= Herpetogramma nigricornalis =

Scientific classification
- Domain: Eukaryota
- Kingdom: Animalia
- Phylum: Arthropoda
- Class: Insecta
- Order: Lepidoptera
- Family: Crambidae
- Genus: Herpetogramma
- Species: H. nigricornalis

Binomial name
- Herpetogramma nigricornalis (C. Swinhoe, 1894)

Synonyms
- Piloptila nigricornalis C. Swinhoe, 1894

Species of moth

Herpetogramma nigricornalis is a species of moth in the family Crambidae. It was described by Charles Swinhoe in 1894. It is found in Meghalaya, India.
