= Herpetogramma tominagai =

Scientific classification
- Domain: Eukaryota
- Kingdom: Animalia
- Phylum: Arthropoda
- Class: Insecta
- Order: Lepidoptera
- Family: Crambidae
- Genus: Herpetogramma
- Species: H. tominagai

Binomial name
- Herpetogramma tominagai Yamanaka, 2003

Species of moth

Herpetogramma tominagai is a species of moth in the family Crambidae. It was described by Hiroshi Yamanaka in 2003. It is found in Japan.

The larvae feed on Achyranthes aspera var. rubrofusa.
