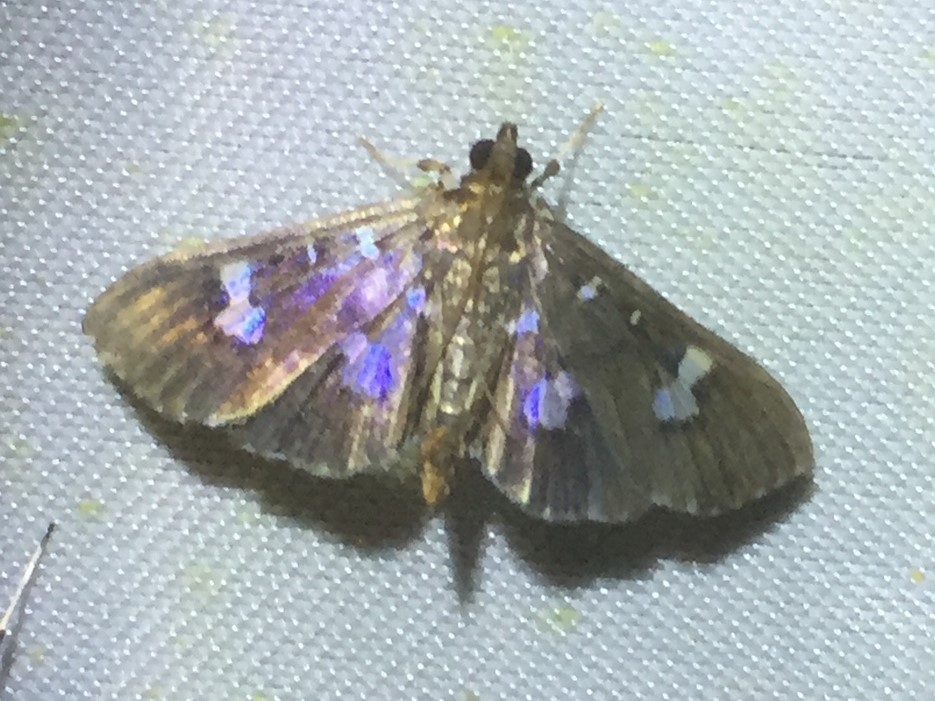

Scientific classification
- Kingdom: Animalia
- Phylum: Arthropoda
- Class: Insecta
- Order: Lepidoptera
- Family: Crambidae
- Genus: Herpetogramma
- Species: H. desmioides

Binomial name
- Herpetogramma desmioides (Hampson, 1899)

Synonyms
- Pachyzancla desmioides Hampson, 1899; Psara desmioides (Hampson, 1899)

= Herpetogramma desmioides =

Species of moth

Herpetogramma desmioides is a species of moth in the family Crambidae. It was described by George Hampson in 1899. It is found in Papua New Guinea, where it has been recorded from Fergusson Island, the largest of the D'Entrecasteaux Islands.
