= Herpetogramma fraxinalis =

- Female

Scientific classification
- Kingdom: Animalia
- Phylum: Arthropoda
- Clade: Pancrustacea
- Class: Insecta
- Order: Lepidoptera
- Family: Crambidae
- Genus: Herpetogramma
- Species: H. fraxinalis

Binomial name
- Herpetogramma fraxinalis Handfield & Handfield, 2021

Species of moth

Herpetogramma fraxinalis is a species of moth in the family Crambidae. It is found in eastern Canada and northeastern United States, corresponding with the native range of Fraxinus americana and Tilia americana.

== Description ==
Herpetogramma fraxinalis' wingspan is between 29–32 mm, with 30 mm being the average. Its head, palpi, and thorax are white; while its collar, tegulae, and abdomen are a light yellow. Its wings are a pale yellow with faint markings, but have a large, yellow, reniform spot.

Herpetogramma fraxinalis is on flight from early July to early August, peaking in late July.
