= Herpetogramma circumflexalis =

Scientific classification
- Kingdom: Animalia
- Phylum: Arthropoda
- Class: Insecta
- Order: Lepidoptera
- Family: Crambidae
- Genus: Herpetogramma
- Species: H. circumflexalis

Binomial name
- Herpetogramma circumflexalis Guenée, 1854

Species of moth

Herpetogramma circumflexalis is a species of moth in the family Crambidae. It was described by Achille Guenée in 1854. It is found in Brazil.
