= Herpetogramma stultalis =

Scientific classification
- Kingdom: Animalia
- Phylum: Arthropoda
- Class: Insecta
- Order: Lepidoptera
- Family: Crambidae
- Genus: Herpetogramma
- Species: H. stultalis

Binomial name
- Herpetogramma stultalis (Walker, 1859)

Synonyms
- Botys stultalis Walker, 1859; Psara stultalis; Botys basistrigalis Walker, [1866]; Botys retractalis Walker, [1866]

Species of moth

Herpetogramma stultalis is a species of moth in the family Crambidae. It was described by Francis Walker in 1859. It is found in Malaysia, India, Sri Lanka, China, Japan, Pakistan, Papua New Guinea and Australia, where it has been recorded from Queensland. In Africa, it has been recorded from the Democratic Republic of the Congo (Equateur, North Kivu) and Réunion.

The wings are white with a vague grey pattern.

The larvae have been recorded feeding on Amaranthaceae and Lamiaceae species, including Coleus species and Hyptis brevipes.
