= Herpetogramma junctalis =

Scientific classification
- Domain: Eukaryota
- Kingdom: Animalia
- Phylum: Arthropoda
- Class: Insecta
- Order: Lepidoptera
- Family: Crambidae
- Genus: Herpetogramma
- Species: H. junctalis

Binomial name
- Herpetogramma junctalis (Dyar, 1910)

Synonyms
- Pachyzancla junctalis Dyar, 1910

Species of moth

Herpetogramma junctalis is a species of moth in the family Crambidae. It was described by Harrison Gray Dyar Jr. in 1910. It is found in Veracruz, Mexico.
