= Herpetogramma olivescens =

Scientific classification
- Domain: Eukaryota
- Kingdom: Animalia
- Phylum: Arthropoda
- Class: Insecta
- Order: Lepidoptera
- Family: Crambidae
- Genus: Herpetogramma
- Species: H. olivescens

Binomial name
- Herpetogramma olivescens (Warren, 1892)

Synonyms
- Acharana olivescens Warren, 1892

Species of moth

Herpetogramma olivescens is a species of moth in the family Crambidae. It was described by Warren in 1892. It is found in Ecuador.
