= Herpetogramma minoralis =

Scientific classification
- Domain: Eukaryota
- Kingdom: Animalia
- Phylum: Arthropoda
- Class: Insecta
- Order: Lepidoptera
- Family: Crambidae
- Genus: Herpetogramma
- Species: H. minoralis

Binomial name
- Herpetogramma minoralis (Warren, 1892)

Synonyms
- Acharana minoralis Warren, 1892

Species of moth

Herpetogramma minoralis is a species of moth in the family Crambidae.

== Distribution ==
It is known from Ghana, La Réunion, Madagascar, Mauritius, Nigeria and Seychelles.

The wingspan is about 16 mm.
