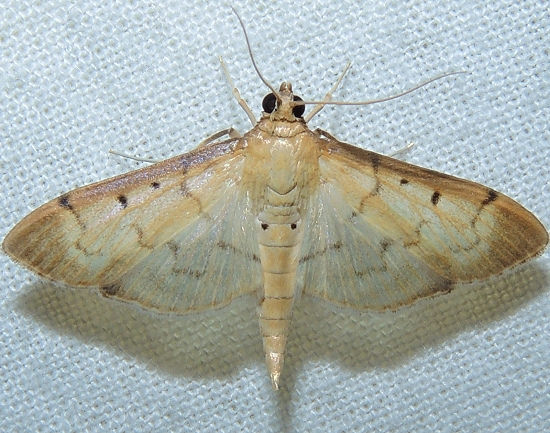

Scientific classification
- Kingdom: Animalia
- Phylum: Arthropoda
- Clade: Pancrustacea
- Class: Insecta
- Order: Lepidoptera
- Family: Crambidae
- Genus: Herpetogramma
- Species: H. bipunctalis

Binomial name
- Herpetogramma bipunctalis (Fabricius, 1794)

Synonyms
- List: Phalaena bipunctalis Fabricius, 1794; Botys detritalis Guenée, 1854; Botys lycialis Walker, 1859; Botys philealis Walker, 1859; Botys repetitalis Grote, 1882; Botys terricolalis Möschler, 1882; Herpetogramma simplex Warren, 1892

= Herpetogramma bipunctalis =

Species of moth

Herpetogramma bipunctalis, commonly known as the southern beet webworm moth or two-spotted herpetogramma, is a species of moth in the family Crambidae. It is found from New England to Florida, west to Texas and north to Illinois. In the south, the range extends through Central America and the Caribbean to South America.

== Description ==
Morphology of Southern Beet Webworm Moth

Eggs are circular to oblong in shape. They are laid in transparent clusters on the underside of leaves. Eggs appear colorless when freshly laid but turn pale brown before hatching.

H. bipunctalis has 5 larval instars. They can reach up to 3–4 cm when matured. First instar has a pale green and slender type of body with a dark head. Fifth instar appears to have a deeper green color on the body with a dark head. This stage is mostly seen in large groups.

Pupal stage is found concealed within the leaf folds or on the soil debris. It is dark brown and obtect. Obtect pupa have appendages like legs and wings glued to the body wall. The pupa of H. bipunctalis has seven spiral crochets.

Adults are moths having a wingspan of 23-24mm. Their fore-wings and hind-wings look similar to each other with a creamy brown color. Wavy and discoidal spots are present on the wings. The abdomen of Brinjal Leaf Webber has 2 dark dorsal spots.

Life Cycle/Biology

The incubation period of egg lasted 4–5 days. The development period of I_{1}, I_{2} and I_{3} of larvae was 2–3 days. I_{4} developed over a period of 2–4 days and I_{5} ranged 3–7 days. Initial instars affected leaves, later made exit holes in stem to reach soil for pupation. Pupal stage lasted 7–12 days and adults were produced. The study showed development of H. bipunctalis from egg to adult ranges from 23–39 days. It showed evidences of holometabolous type of metamorphosis.
