= Herpetogramma schausi =

Scientific classification
- Domain: Eukaryota
- Kingdom: Animalia
- Phylum: Arthropoda
- Class: Insecta
- Order: Lepidoptera
- Family: Crambidae
- Genus: Herpetogramma
- Species: H. schausi

Binomial name
- Herpetogramma schausi Munroe, 1995

Synonyms
- Psara grisealis Schaus, 1933

Species of moth

Herpetogramma schausi is a species of moth in the family Crambidae. It was described by Eugene G. Munroe in 1995. It is found in Brazil.
