= Herpetogramma yaeyamense =

Scientific classification
- Domain: Eukaryota
- Kingdom: Animalia
- Phylum: Arthropoda
- Class: Insecta
- Order: Lepidoptera
- Family: Crambidae
- Genus: Herpetogramma
- Species: H. yaeyamense

Binomial name
- Herpetogramma yaeyamense Yamanaka, 2003

Species of moth

Herpetogramma yaeyamense is a species of moth in the family Crambidae. It was described by Hiroshi Yamanaka in 2003. It is found in Japan's Ryukyu Islands.
