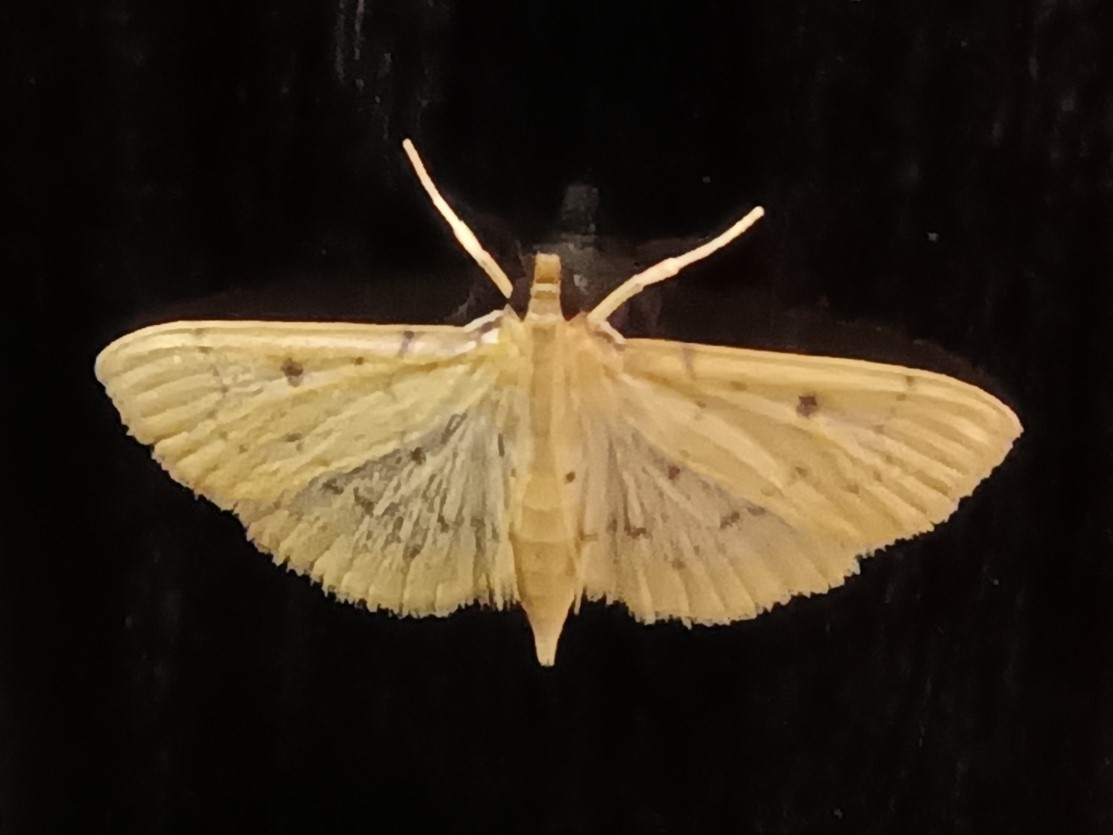

Scientific classification
- Kingdom: Animalia
- Phylum: Arthropoda
- Class: Insecta
- Order: Lepidoptera
- Family: Crambidae
- Genus: Herpetogramma
- Species: H. basalis

Binomial name
- Herpetogramma basalis (Walker, 1866)

Synonyms
- List: Botys basalis Walker, 1866; Psara basalis; Botys inanitalis Lederer, 1863; Pyrausta dorsipunctalis Rebel, 1892; Herpetogramma dorsipunctalis (Rebel, 1892); Pyrausta dorcalis Alphéraky, 1889

= Herpetogramma basalis =

Species of moth

Herpetogramma basalis is a species of moth in the family Crambidae. It is found on the Canary Islands and in Japan, China, Australia, Sri Lanka, India, Indonesia, La Réunion, South Africa, and Mali.

== Description ==
The wingspan is 20–22 mm. Adults are yellowish with fine black speckles on the wings.

== Behaviour and ecology ==
The larvae feed on Amaranthus species, Lantana camara, beetroot, cucurbits and radish.
