= Herpetogramma fimbrialis =

Scientific classification
- Domain: Eukaryota
- Kingdom: Animalia
- Phylum: Arthropoda
- Class: Insecta
- Order: Lepidoptera
- Family: Crambidae
- Genus: Herpetogramma
- Species: H. fimbrialis

Binomial name
- Herpetogramma fimbrialis (Dognin, 1904)

Synonyms
- Pachyzancla fimbrialis Dognin, 1904

Species of moth

Herpetogramma fimbrialis is a species of moth in the family Crambidae. It was described by Paul Dognin in 1904. It is found in Ecuador.
