= Herpetogramma gnamptoceralis =

Scientific classification
- Kingdom: Animalia
- Phylum: Arthropoda
- Class: Insecta
- Order: Lepidoptera
- Family: Crambidae
- Genus: Herpetogramma
- Species: H. gnamptoceralis

Binomial name
- Herpetogramma gnamptoceralis (Hampson, 1917)

Synonyms
- Pilocrocis gnamptoceralis Hampson, 1917

Species of moth

Herpetogramma gnamptoceralis is a species of moth in the family Crambidae. It was described by George Hampson in 1917. It is found in Panama.
