= Herpetogramma amselalis =

Scientific classification
- Domain: Eukaryota
- Kingdom: Animalia
- Phylum: Arthropoda
- Class: Insecta
- Order: Lepidoptera
- Family: Crambidae
- Genus: Herpetogramma
- Species: H. amselalis

Binomial name
- Herpetogramma amselalis Munroe, 1995

Synonyms
- Herpetogramma grisealis Amsel, 1956

Species of moth

Herpetogramma amselalis is a species of moth in the family Crambidae. It was described by Eugene G. Munroe in 1995. It is found in Venezuela.
