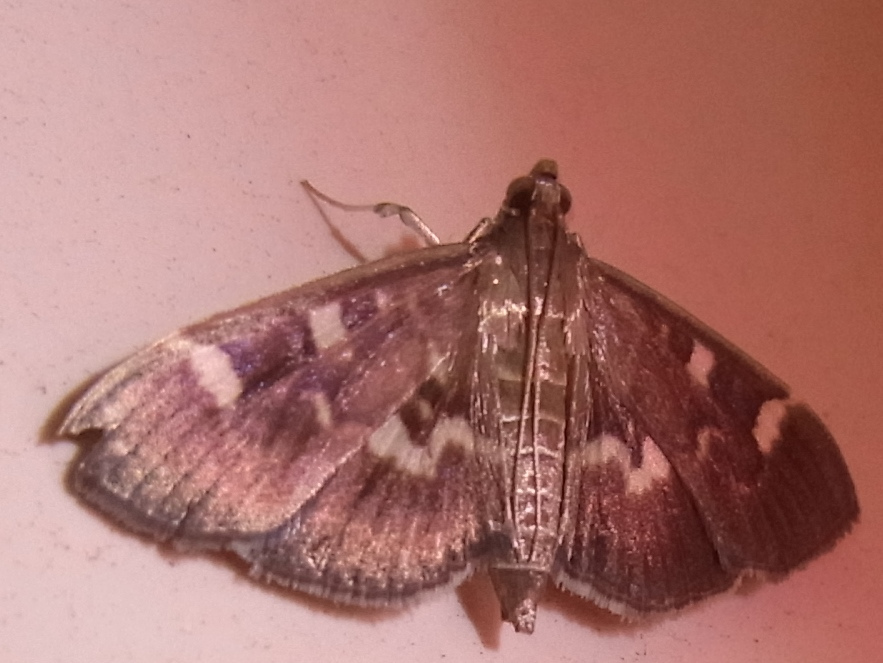

Scientific classification
- Kingdom: Animalia
- Phylum: Arthropoda
- Class: Insecta
- Order: Lepidoptera
- Family: Crambidae
- Genus: Herpetogramma
- Species: H. luctuosalis

Binomial name
- Herpetogramma luctuosalis (Guenée, 1854)

Synonyms
- Hyalitis luctuosalis Guenée, 1854; Botys cosisalis Walker, 1859; Botys oemealis Walker, 1859; bremeri Wocke, 1871; Coptobasis andamanalis Moore, 1877; Ebulea zelleri Bremer, 1864; Hymenia erebina Butler, 1878

= Herpetogramma luctuosalis =

Species of moth

Herpetogramma luctuosalis is a species of moth in the family Crambidae. It was described by Achille Guenée in 1854. It is found in Siberia, Malaysia, India, Taiwan and China.
