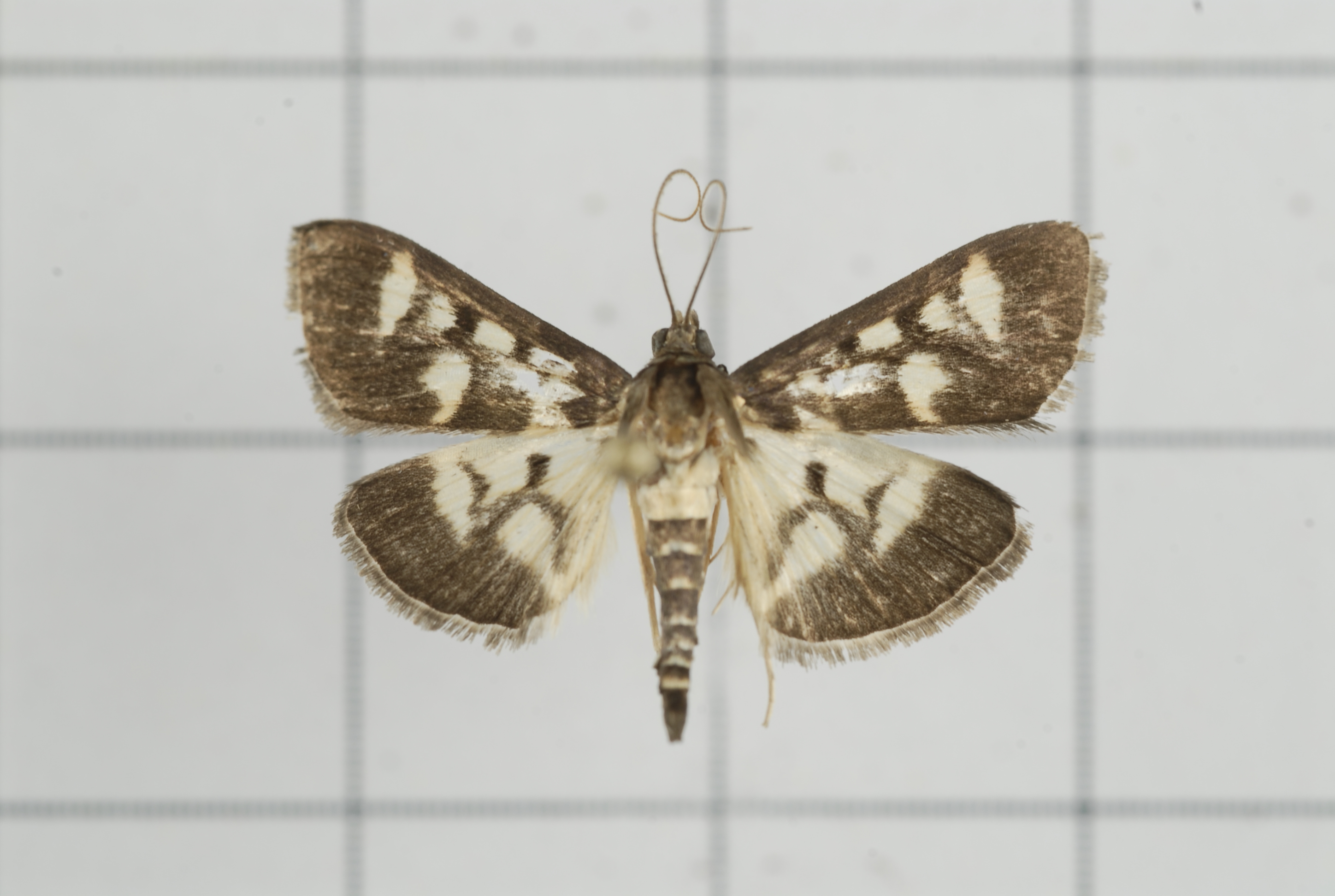

Scientific classification
- Domain: Eukaryota
- Kingdom: Animalia
- Phylum: Arthropoda
- Class: Insecta
- Order: Lepidoptera
- Family: Crambidae
- Genus: Herpetogramma
- Species: H. ochrimaculalis

Binomial name
- Herpetogramma ochrimaculalis (South in Leech & South, 1901)

Synonyms
- Nacoleia ochrimaculalis South in Leech & South, 1901

= Herpetogramma ochrimaculalis =

Species of moth

Herpetogramma ochrimaculalis is a species of moth in the family Crambidae. It was described by South in 1901. It is found in China, Japan and Taiwan.
