= Herpetogramma obscurior =

Scientific classification
- Domain: Eukaryota
- Kingdom: Animalia
- Phylum: Arthropoda
- Class: Insecta
- Order: Lepidoptera
- Family: Crambidae
- Genus: Herpetogramma
- Species: H. obscurior

Binomial name
- Herpetogramma obscurior Munroe, 1963

Species of moth

Herpetogramma obscurior is a species of moth in the family Crambidae. It was described by Eugene G. Munroe in 1963. It is found in Peru.
