= Herpetogramma cervinicosta =

Scientific classification
- Kingdom: Animalia
- Phylum: Arthropoda
- Class: Insecta
- Order: Lepidoptera
- Family: Crambidae
- Genus: Herpetogramma
- Species: H. cervinicosta

Binomial name
- Herpetogramma cervinicosta (Hampson, 1918)

Synonyms
- Lamprosema cervinicosta Hampson, 1918

Species of moth

Herpetogramma cervinicosta is a species of moth in the family Crambidae. It was described by George Hampson in 1918. It is found in Colombia and Honduras.
