= Herpetogramma fascinalis =

Scientific classification
- Domain: Eukaryota
- Kingdom: Animalia
- Phylum: Arthropoda
- Class: Insecta
- Order: Lepidoptera
- Family: Crambidae
- Genus: Herpetogramma
- Species: H. fascinalis

Binomial name
- Herpetogramma fascinalis (Amsel, 1950)

Synonyms
- Pachyzancla fascinalis Amsel, 1950

Species of moth

Herpetogramma fascinalis is a species of moth in the family Crambidae. It was described by Hans Georg Amsel in 1950. It is found in Iran.
