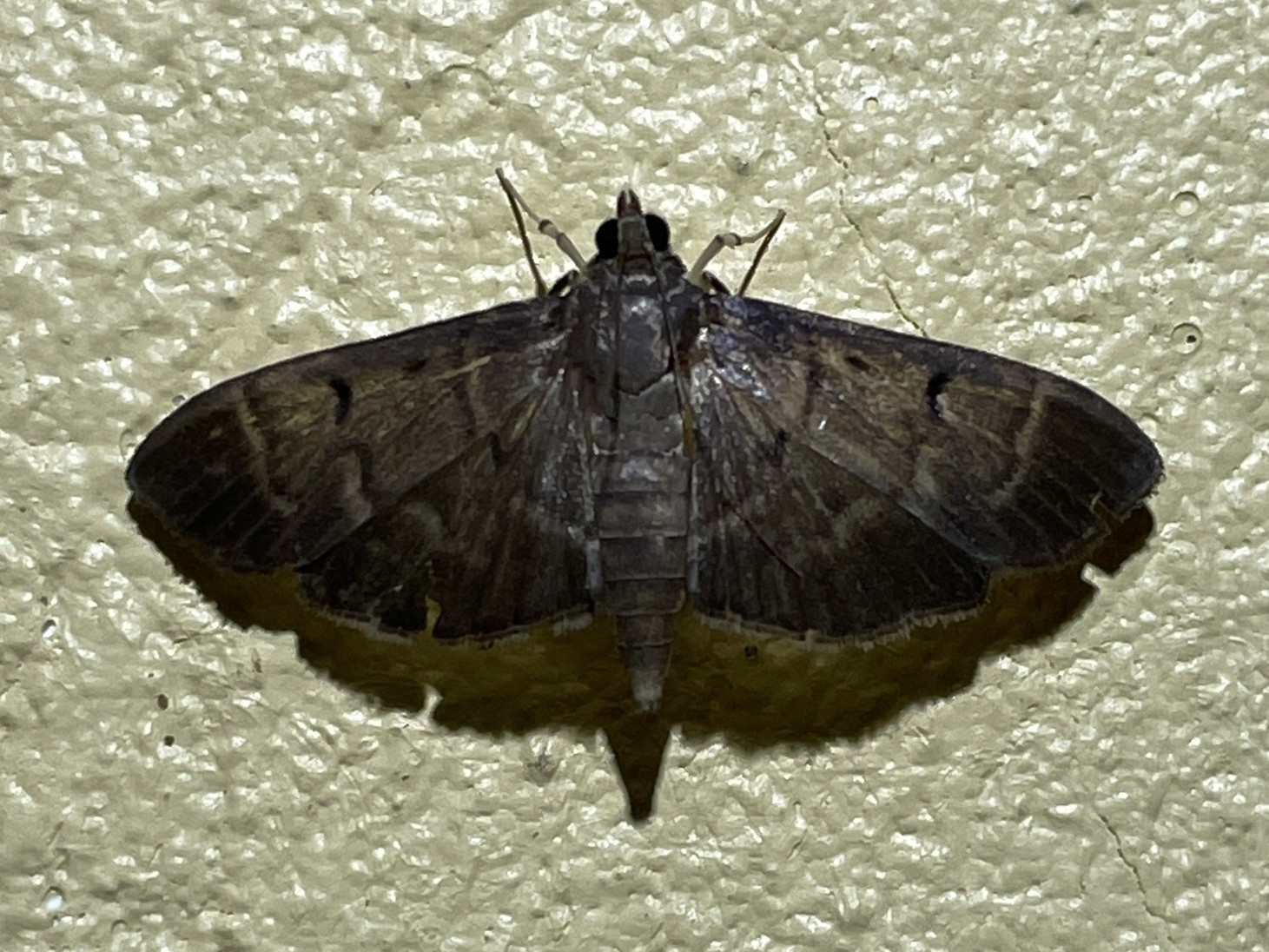

Scientific classification
- Domain: Eukaryota
- Kingdom: Animalia
- Phylum: Arthropoda
- Class: Insecta
- Order: Lepidoptera
- Family: Crambidae
- Genus: Herpetogramma
- Species: H. servalis

Binomial name
- Herpetogramma servalis Lederer, 1863

= Herpetogramma servalis =

Species of moth

Herpetogramma servalis is a species of moth in the family Crambidae. It was described by Julius Lederer in 1863. It is found in Brazil.
