= Herpetogramma phthorosticta =

Scientific classification
- Kingdom: Animalia
- Phylum: Arthropoda
- Class: Insecta
- Order: Lepidoptera
- Family: Crambidae
- Genus: Herpetogramma
- Species: H. phthorosticta

Binomial name
- Herpetogramma phthorosticta (Meyrick, 1929)

Synonyms
- Pyrausta phthorosticta Meyrick, 1929

Species of moth

Herpetogramma phthorosticta is a species of moth in the family Crambidae. It was described by Edward Meyrick in 1929. It is found on the Marquesas Archipelago in French Polynesia.
