= Herpetogramma zophosticta =

Scientific classification
- Domain: Eukaryota
- Kingdom: Animalia
- Phylum: Arthropoda
- Class: Insecta
- Order: Lepidoptera
- Family: Crambidae
- Genus: Herpetogramma
- Species: H. zophosticta

Binomial name
- Herpetogramma zophosticta (Turner, 1915)

Synonyms
- Sylepta zophosticta Turner, 1915

Species of moth

Herpetogramma zophosticta is a species of moth in the family Crambidae. It was described by Turner in 1915. It is found in Australia, where it has been recorded from the Northern Territory.
