= Herpetogramma centrostrigalis =

Scientific classification
- Domain: Eukaryota
- Kingdom: Animalia
- Phylum: Arthropoda
- Class: Insecta
- Order: Lepidoptera
- Family: Crambidae
- Genus: Herpetogramma
- Species: H. centrostrigalis

Binomial name
- Herpetogramma centrostrigalis (Stephens, 1934)

Synonyms
- Margarita centrostrigalis Stephens, 1934

Species of moth

Herpetogramma centrostrigalis is a species of moth in the family Crambidae. It was described by Stephens in 1934. The species was described from a single specimen taken in Devon, England.

The wingspan is 29–31 mm.
