= Herpetogramma ottonalis =

Scientific classification
- Domain: Eukaryota
- Kingdom: Animalia
- Phylum: Arthropoda
- Class: Insecta
- Order: Lepidoptera
- Family: Crambidae
- Genus: Herpetogramma
- Species: H. ottonalis

Binomial name
- Herpetogramma ottonalis (Semper, 1899)

Synonyms
- Pachyzancla ottonalis Semper, 1899

Species of moth

Herpetogramma ottonalis is a species of moth in the family Crambidae. It was described by Georg Semper in 1899. It is found on Luzon in the Philippines.
