= Herpetogramma retrorsalis =

Scientific classification
- Kingdom: Animalia
- Phylum: Arthropoda
- Class: Insecta
- Order: Lepidoptera
- Family: Crambidae
- Genus: Herpetogramma
- Species: H. retrorsalis

Binomial name
- Herpetogramma retrorsalis (Hampson, 1918)

Synonyms
- Psara retrorsalis Hampson, 1918

Species of moth

Herpetogramma retrorsalis is a species of moth in the family Crambidae. It was described by George Hampson in 1918. It is found in Ecuador.
