= Herpetogramma grisealis =

Scientific classification
- Kingdom: Animalia
- Phylum: Arthropoda
- Class: Insecta
- Order: Lepidoptera
- Family: Crambidae
- Genus: Herpetogramma
- Species: H. grisealis

Binomial name
- Herpetogramma grisealis (Snellen, 1875)

Synonyms
- Botys grisealis Snellen, 1875

Species of moth

Herpetogramma grisealis is a species of moth in the family Crambidae. It was described by Snellen in 1875. It is found in Colombia.
