= Herpetogramma fuscescens =

Scientific classification
- Domain: Eukaryota
- Kingdom: Animalia
- Phylum: Arthropoda
- Class: Insecta
- Order: Lepidoptera
- Family: Crambidae
- Genus: Herpetogramma
- Species: H. fuscescens

Binomial name
- Herpetogramma fuscescens (Warren, 1892)

Synonyms
- Acharana fuscescens Warren, 1892

Species of moth

Herpetogramma fuscescens is a species of moth in the family Crambidae. It was described by William Warren in 1892. It is found in Japan.
