= Herpetogramma platycapna =

Scientific classification
- Kingdom: Animalia
- Phylum: Arthropoda
- Class: Insecta
- Order: Lepidoptera
- Family: Crambidae
- Genus: Herpetogramma
- Species: H. platycapna

Binomial name
- Herpetogramma platycapna (Meyrick, 1897)

Synonyms
- Pyrausta platycapna Meyrick, 1897; Pachyzancla platycapna

Species of moth

Herpetogramma platycapna is a species of moth in the subfamily Spilomelinae of the family Crambidae. It was described by Edward Meyrick in 1897. It is found in Malaysia, Indonesia (Sulawesi), New Guinea, the Keeling Islands and Australia, where it has been recorded from the Northern Territory.

The wingspan is about 20 mm. Adults are yellow with broad dark brown wing margins.

The gregarious larvae are recorded to feed on the fern Angiopteris evecta (Marattiaceae).
