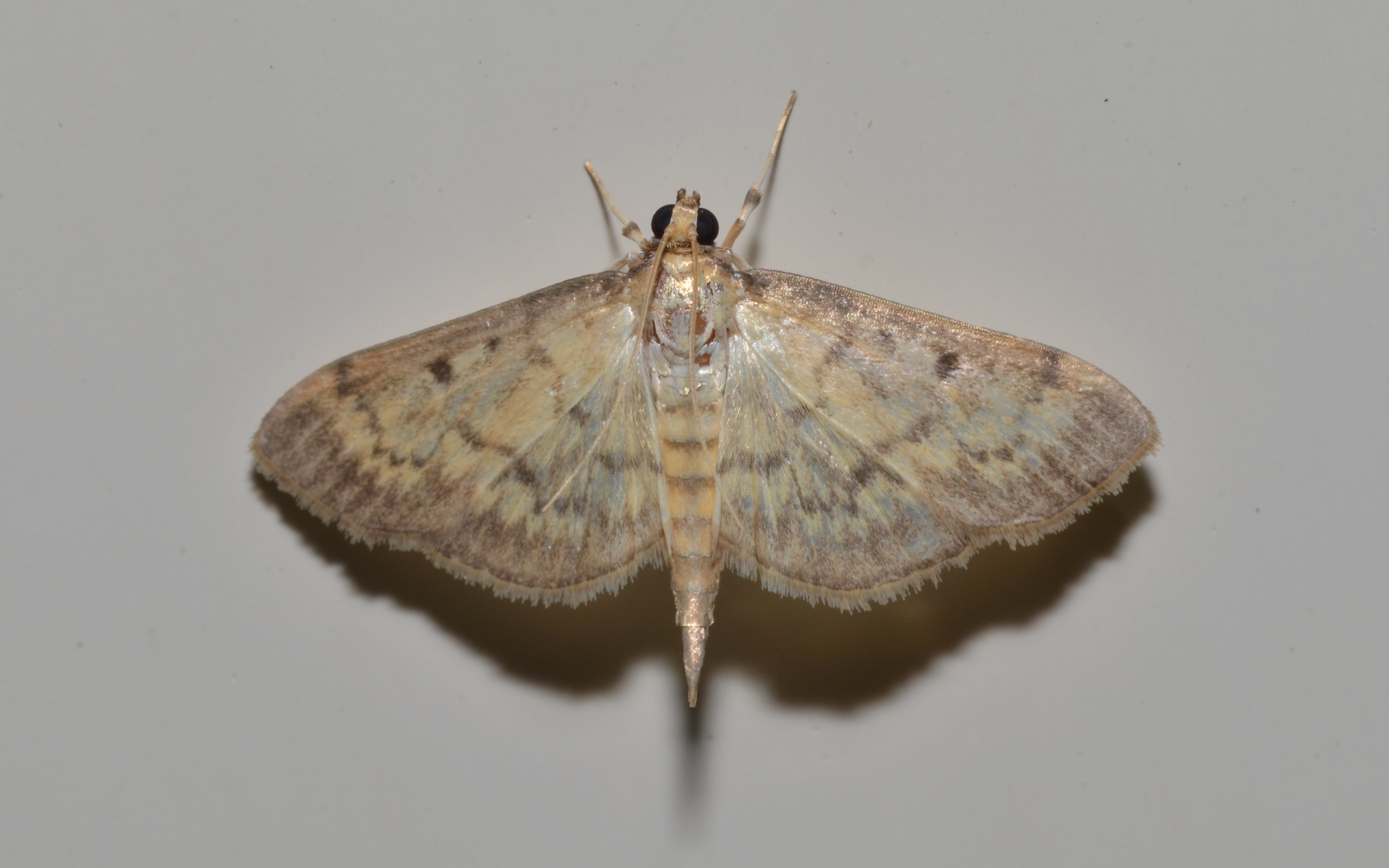

Scientific classification
- Domain: Eukaryota
- Kingdom: Animalia
- Phylum: Arthropoda
- Class: Insecta
- Order: Lepidoptera
- Family: Crambidae
- Genus: Herpetogramma
- Species: H. fluctuosalis

Binomial name
- Herpetogramma fluctuosalis (Lederer, 1863)

Synonyms
- Botys fluctuosalis Lederer, 1863; Pachyzancla ipomoealis Capps, 1964

= Herpetogramma fluctuosalis =

Species of moth

Herpetogramma fluctuosalis, commonly known as the greater sweet potato webworm moth, is a species of moth in the family Crambidae. It is found in the West Indies, Mexico and in the United States, where it has been recorded from Maryland to Florida, west to Texas.

== Description ==
The wingspan is 22–25 mm. Adults are on wing from April to July and in October and December in Florida.

== Behaviour and ecology ==
The larvae feed on Boehmeria cylindrica and Ipomoea batatas.
