= Herpetogramma emphatica =

Scientific classification
- Kingdom: Animalia
- Phylum: Arthropoda
- Class: Insecta
- Order: Lepidoptera
- Family: Crambidae
- Genus: Herpetogramma
- Species: H. emphatica

Binomial name
- Herpetogramma emphatica (Dyar, 1926)

Synonyms
- Psara emphatica Dyar, 1926

Species of moth

Herpetogramma emphatica is a species of moth in the family Crambidae. It was described by Harrison Gray Dyar Jr. in 1926. It is found in Mexico.
