= Herpetogramma tenella =

Scientific classification
- Kingdom: Animalia
- Phylum: Arthropoda
- Class: Insecta
- Order: Lepidoptera
- Family: Crambidae
- Genus: Herpetogramma
- Species: H. tenella

Binomial name
- Herpetogramma tenella (Hampson, 1897)

Synonyms
- Ambia tenella Hampson, 1897

Species of moth

Herpetogramma tenella is a species of moth in the family Crambidae. It was described by George Hampson in 1897. It is found in Peru.
