= Herpetogramma atrirenalis =

Scientific classification
- Kingdom: Animalia
- Phylum: Arthropoda
- Class: Insecta
- Order: Lepidoptera
- Family: Crambidae
- Genus: Herpetogramma
- Species: H. atrirenalis

Binomial name
- Herpetogramma atrirenalis (Hampson, 1912)

Synonyms
- Nacoleia atrirenalis Hampson, 1912

Species of moth

Herpetogramma atrirenalis is a species of moth in the family Crambidae. It was described by George Hampson in 1912. It is found in Paraguay.
