= Herpetogramma hirsuta =

Scientific classification
- Domain: Eukaryota
- Kingdom: Animalia
- Phylum: Arthropoda
- Class: Insecta
- Order: Lepidoptera
- Family: Crambidae
- Genus: Herpetogramma
- Species: H. hirsuta

Binomial name
- Herpetogramma hirsuta (Dognin, 1903)

Synonyms
- Pachyzancla hirsuta Dognin, 1903

Species of moth

Herpetogramma hirsuta is a species of moth in the family Crambidae. It was described by Paul Dognin in 1903. It is found in Ecuador.
