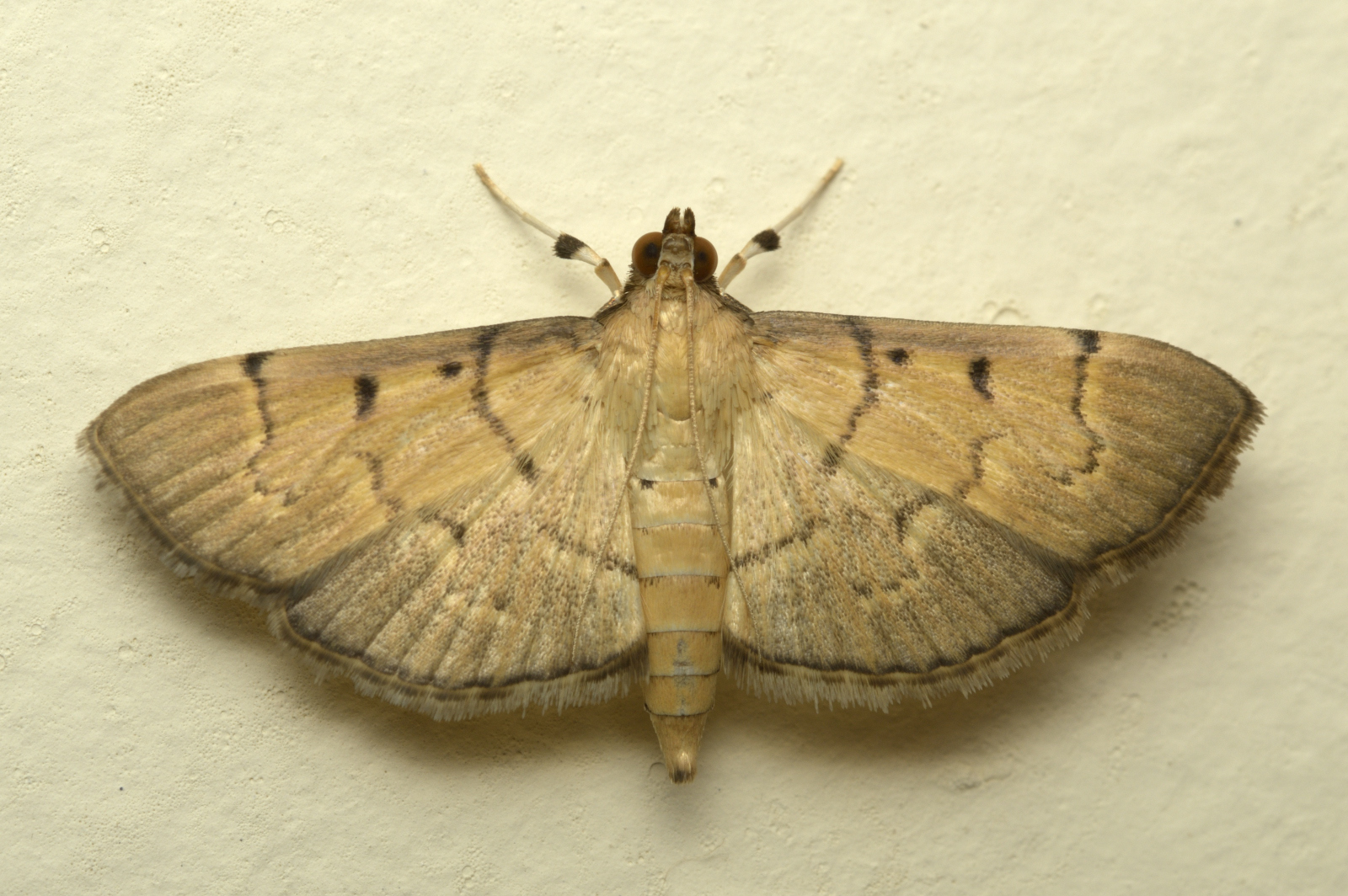

Scientific classification
- Domain: Eukaryota
- Kingdom: Animalia
- Phylum: Arthropoda
- Class: Insecta
- Order: Lepidoptera
- Family: Crambidae
- Genus: Herpetogramma
- Species: H. rudis

Binomial name
- Herpetogramma rudis (Warren, 1892)

Synonyms
- Acharana rudis Warren, 1892

= Herpetogramma rudis =

Species of moth

Herpetogramma rudis is a species of moth in the family Crambidae. It was described by Warren in 1892. It is found in China, Japan, Tibet, Korea and India.

The wingspan is 25–28 mm.
