= Herpetogramma bermudalis =

Scientific classification
- Kingdom: Animalia
- Phylum: Arthropoda
- Class: Insecta
- Order: Lepidoptera
- Family: Crambidae
- Genus: Herpetogramma
- Species: H. bermudalis

Binomial name
- Herpetogramma bermudalis (Dyar, 1915)

Synonyms
- Pyrausta bermudalis Dyar, 1915

Species of moth

Herpetogramma bermudalis is a species of moth in the family Crambidae. It was described by Harrison Gray Dyar Jr. in 1915. It is found in Bermuda.
