= Herpetogramma brunnealis =

Scientific classification
- Kingdom: Animalia
- Phylum: Arthropoda
- Class: Insecta
- Order: Lepidoptera
- Family: Crambidae
- Genus: Herpetogramma
- Species: H. brunnealis

Binomial name
- Herpetogramma brunnealis (Hampson, 1913)

Synonyms
- Pachyzancla brunnealis Hampson, 1913

Species of moth

Herpetogramma brunnealis is a species of moth in the family Crambidae. It was described by George Hampson in 1913. It is found on Mayotte and Réunion and in Ghana, Madagascar and Nigeria.
