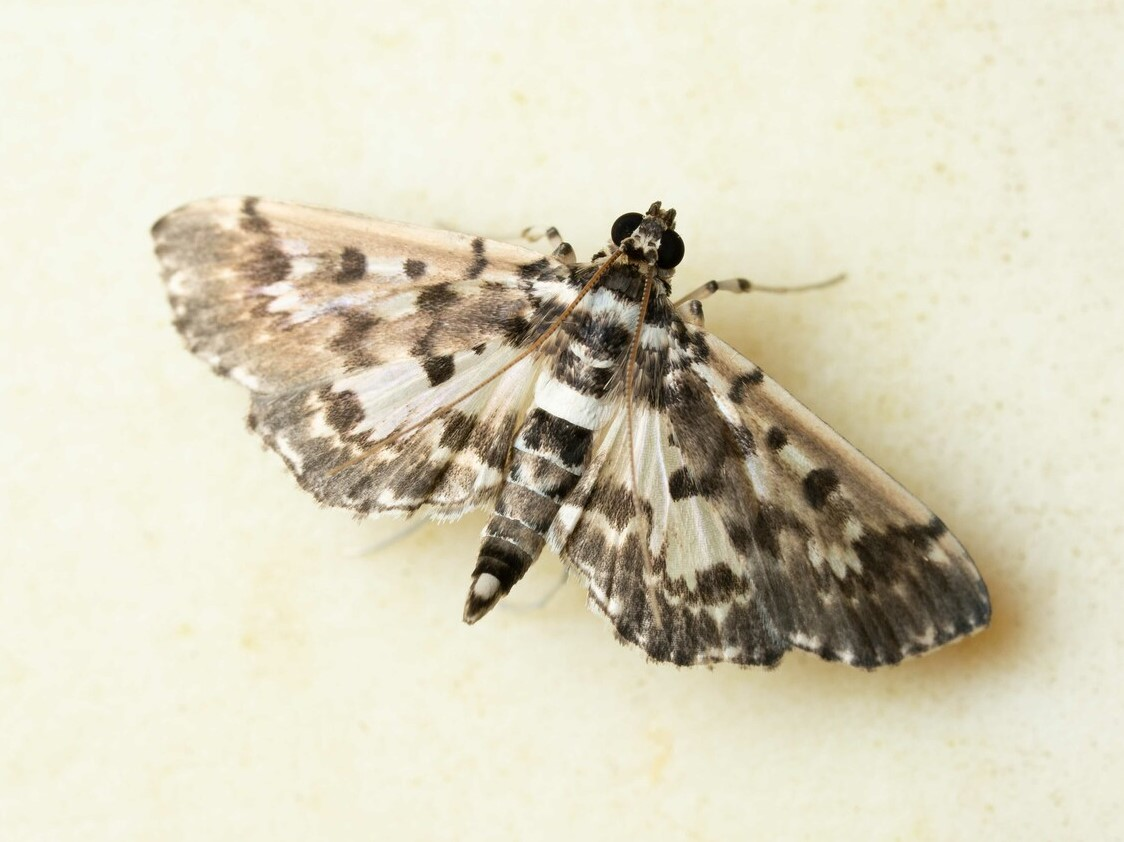

Scientific classification
- Domain: Eukaryota
- Kingdom: Animalia
- Phylum: Arthropoda
- Class: Insecta
- Order: Lepidoptera
- Family: Crambidae
- Genus: Herpetogramma
- Species: H. exculta

Binomial name
- Herpetogramma exculta (T. P. Lucas, 1892)

Synonyms
- Notarcha exculta T. P. Lucas, 1892

= Herpetogramma exculta =

Species of moth

Herpetogramma exculta is a species of moth in the family Crambidae. It was described by Thomas Pennington Lucas in 1892. It is found in Australia, where it has been recorded from Queensland.
