= Herpetogramma lulalis =

Scientific classification
- Domain: Eukaryota
- Kingdom: Animalia
- Phylum: Arthropoda
- Class: Insecta
- Order: Lepidoptera
- Family: Crambidae
- Genus: Herpetogramma
- Species: H. lulalis

Binomial name
- Herpetogramma lulalis (Strand, 1918)

Synonyms
- Sylepta lulalis Strand, 1918

Species of moth

Herpetogramma lulalis is a species of moth in the family Crambidae. It was described by Strand in 1918. It is found in Taiwan.
