= Herpetogramma albipennis =

Scientific classification
- Kingdom: Animalia
- Phylum: Arthropoda
- Class: Insecta
- Order: Lepidoptera
- Family: Crambidae
- Genus: Herpetogramma
- Species: H. albipennis

Binomial name
- Herpetogramma albipennis Inoue, 2000

Species of moth

Herpetogramma albipennis is a species of moth in the family Crambidae. It was described by Hiroshi Inoue in 2000. It is found in Japan.
