= Herpetogramma holochrysis =

Scientific classification
- Kingdom: Animalia
- Phylum: Arthropoda
- Class: Insecta
- Order: Lepidoptera
- Family: Crambidae
- Genus: Herpetogramma
- Species: H. holochrysis

Binomial name
- Herpetogramma holochrysis (Hampson, 1913)

Synonyms
- Pachyzancla holochrysis Hampson, 1913

Species of moth

Herpetogramma holochrysis is a species of moth in the family Crambidae. It was described by George Hampson in 1913. It is found in Guerrero, Mexico.
