= Herpetogramma cora =

Scientific classification
- Kingdom: Animalia
- Phylum: Arthropoda
- Class: Insecta
- Order: Lepidoptera
- Family: Crambidae
- Genus: Herpetogramma
- Species: H. cora

Binomial name
- Herpetogramma cora (Dyar, 1914)

Synonyms
- Pilocrocis cora Dyar, 1914

Species of moth

Herpetogramma cora is a species of moth in the family Crambidae. It was described by Harrison Gray Dyar Jr. in 1914. It is found in Mexico (Orizaba) and Cuba.
