= Herpetogramma piasusalis =

Scientific classification
- Kingdom: Animalia
- Phylum: Arthropoda
- Class: Insecta
- Order: Lepidoptera
- Family: Crambidae
- Genus: Herpetogramma
- Species: H. piasusalis

Binomial name
- Herpetogramma piasusalis (Walker, 1859)

Synonyms
- Botys piasusalis Walker, 1859

Species of moth

Herpetogramma piasusalis is a species of moth in the family Crambidae. It was described by Francis Walker in 1859. It is found in Australia, where it has been recorded from Queensland. It has also been recorded from Indonesia (Java), Kenya, Madagascar and Zambia.
