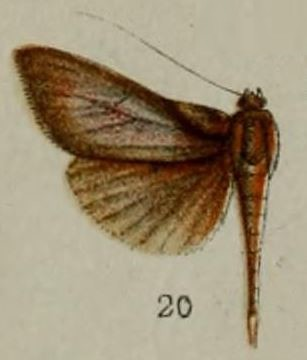

Scientific classification
- Kingdom: Animalia
- Phylum: Arthropoda
- Class: Insecta
- Order: Lepidoptera
- Family: Crambidae
- Genus: Herpetogramma
- Species: H. omphalobasis

Binomial name
- Herpetogramma omphalobasis (Hampson, 1899)

Synonyms
- Phryganodes omphalobasis Hampson, 1899

= Herpetogramma omphalobasis =

Species of moth

Herpetogramma omphalobasis is a species of moth in the family Crambidae. It was described by George Hampson in 1899. It is found in Venezuela.
