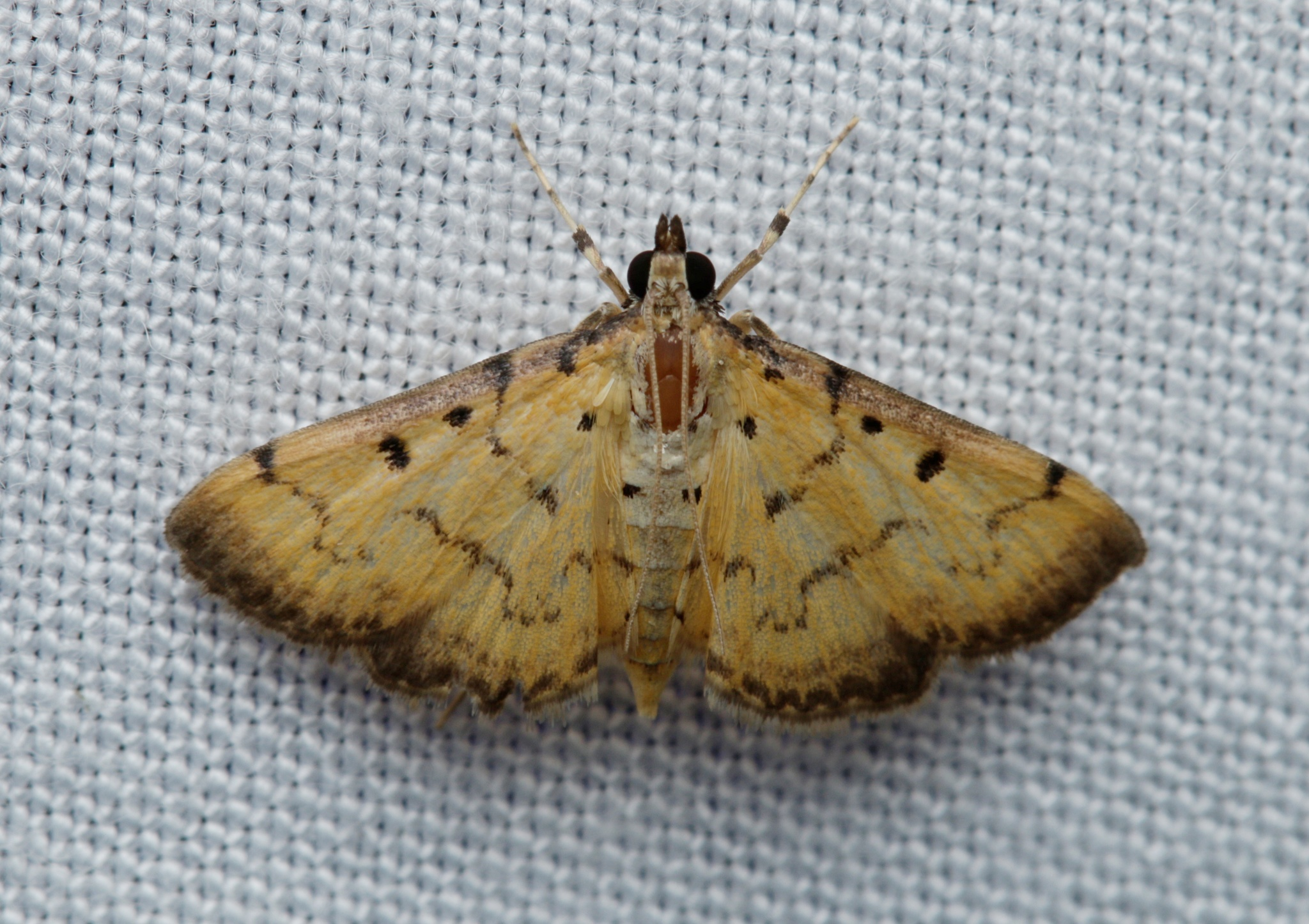

Scientific classification
- Kingdom: Animalia
- Phylum: Arthropoda
- Class: Insecta
- Order: Lepidoptera
- Family: Crambidae
- Genus: Herpetogramma
- Species: H. hipponalis

Binomial name
- Herpetogramma hipponalis (Walker, 1859)

Synonyms
- Asopia hipponalis Walker, 1859; Botys pigresalis Walker, 1859; Pyrausta systematica Meyrick, 1932

= Herpetogramma hipponalis =

Species of moth

Herpetogramma hipponalis is a species of moth in the family Crambidae. It was described by Francis Walker in 1859. It is found in Malaysia, China, the Keeling Islands, Guadalcanal, New Guinea and Australia, where it has been recorded from the Northern Territory and Queensland.
