= Herpetogramma antillalis =

Scientific classification
- Domain: Eukaryota
- Kingdom: Animalia
- Phylum: Arthropoda
- Class: Insecta
- Order: Lepidoptera
- Family: Crambidae
- Genus: Herpetogramma
- Species: H. antillalis

Binomial name
- Herpetogramma antillalis (Schaus, 1920)

Synonyms
- Psara antillalis Schaus, 1920

Species of moth

Herpetogramma antillalis is a species of moth in the family Crambidae. It was described by Schaus in 1920. It is found on Hispaniola and Cuba.
