= Herpetogramma coptobasalis =

Scientific classification
- Kingdom: Animalia
- Phylum: Arthropoda
- Class: Insecta
- Order: Lepidoptera
- Family: Crambidae
- Genus: Herpetogramma
- Species: H. coptobasalis

Binomial name
- Herpetogramma coptobasalis (Hampson, 1899)

Synonyms
- Pachyzancla coptobasalis Hampson, 1899

Species of moth

Herpetogramma coptobasalis is a species of moth in the family Crambidae. It was described by George Hampson in 1899. It is found in Bhutan.
