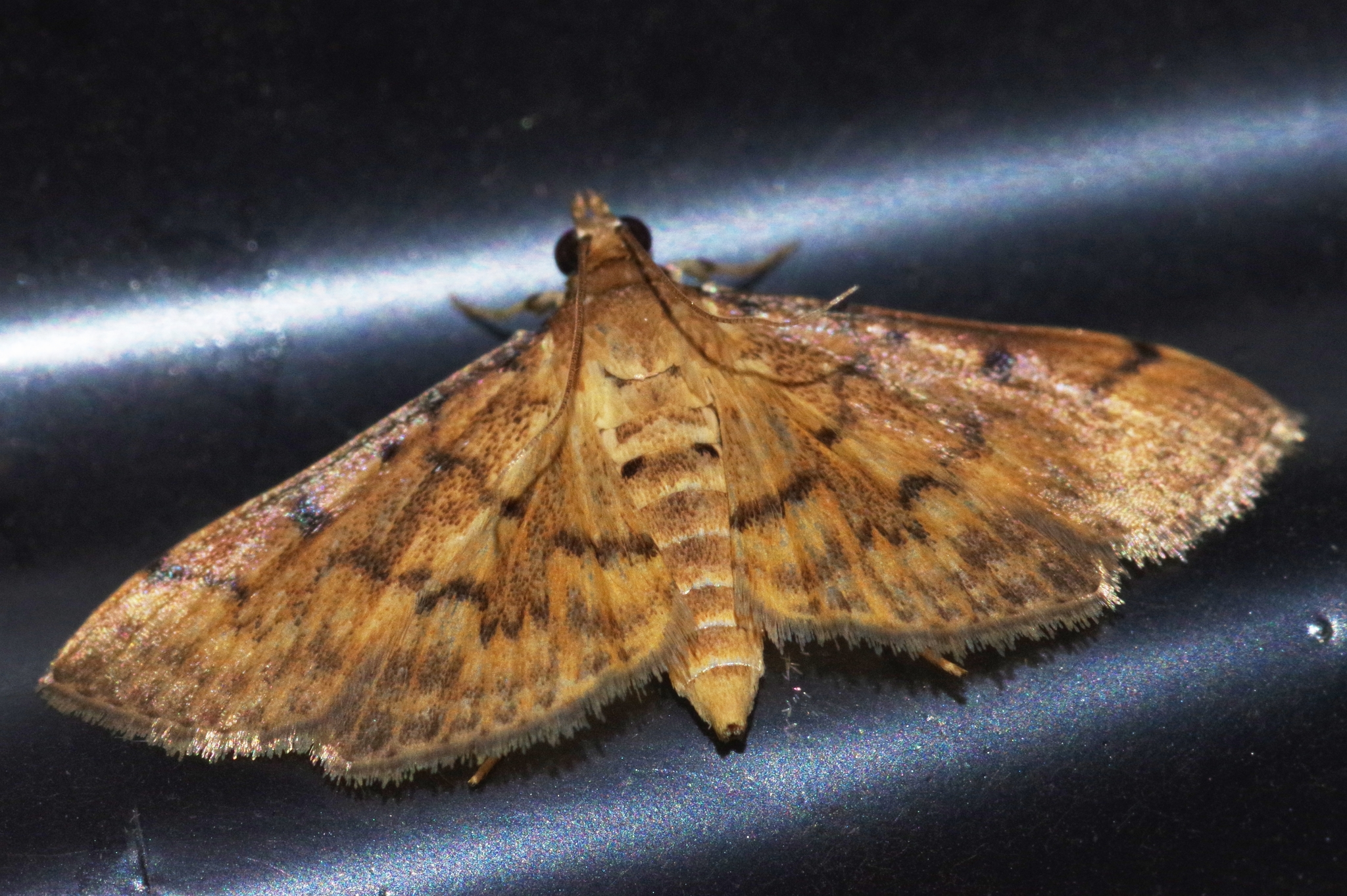

Scientific classification
- Domain: Eukaryota
- Kingdom: Animalia
- Phylum: Arthropoda
- Class: Insecta
- Order: Lepidoptera
- Family: Crambidae
- Genus: Herpetogramma
- Species: H. submarginalis

Binomial name
- Herpetogramma submarginalis (C. Swinhoe, 1901)

Synonyms
- Pachyzancla submarginalis C. Swinhoe, 1901

= Herpetogramma submarginalis =

Species of moth

Herpetogramma submarginalis is a species of moth in the family Crambidae. It was described by Charles Swinhoe in 1901. It is found on Borneo.
