= Herpetogramma mellealis =

Scientific classification
- Domain: Eukaryota
- Kingdom: Animalia
- Phylum: Arthropoda
- Class: Insecta
- Order: Lepidoptera
- Family: Crambidae
- Genus: Herpetogramma
- Species: H. mellealis

Binomial name
- Herpetogramma mellealis (C. Swinhoe, 1890)

Synonyms
- Pachyzancla mellealis C. Swinhoe, 1890

Species of moth

Herpetogramma mellealis is a species of moth in the family Crambidae. It was described by Charles Swinhoe in 1890. It is found in Myanmar.
