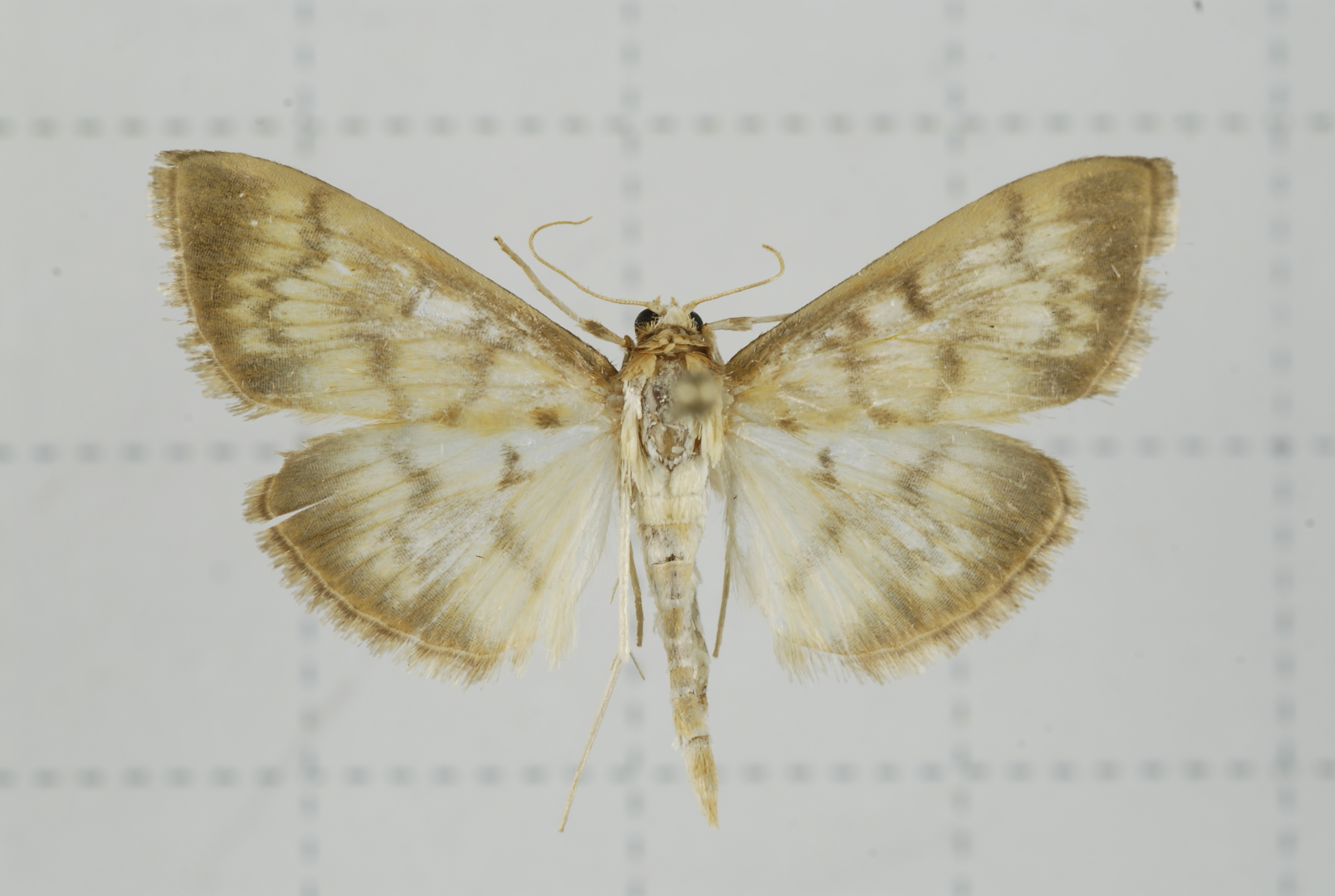

Scientific classification
- Domain: Eukaryota
- Kingdom: Animalia
- Phylum: Arthropoda
- Class: Insecta
- Order: Lepidoptera
- Family: Crambidae
- Genus: Herpetogramma
- Species: H. moderatalis

Binomial name
- Herpetogramma moderatalis (Christoph, 1881)

Synonyms
- Botys moderatalis Christoph, 1881

= Herpetogramma moderatalis =

Species of moth

Herpetogramma moderatalis is a species of moth in the family Crambidae. It was described by Hugo Theodor Christoph in 1881. It is found in Japan, Korea, the Russian Far East (Amur, Ussuri) and China.

The wingspan is 31–35 mm.

The larvae have been recorded feeding on Petasites japonica, living in a rolled leaf of their host plant.
