= Spilosoma heterogenea =

Scientific classification
- Domain: Eukaryota
- Kingdom: Animalia
- Phylum: Arthropoda
- Class: Insecta
- Order: Lepidoptera
- Superfamily: Noctuoidea
- Family: Erebidae
- Subfamily: Arctiinae
- Genus: Spilosoma
- Species: S. heterogenea

Binomial name
- Spilosoma heterogenea Bartel, 1903

Species of moth

Spilosoma heterogenea is a moth in the family Erebidae. It was described by Max Bartel in 1903. It is found in Angola.
