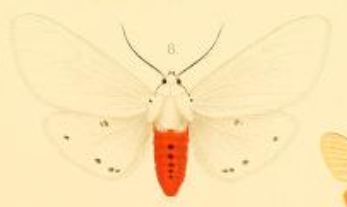
- Mémoires sur les lépidoptères (1897)

Scientific classification
- Domain: Eukaryota
- Kingdom: Animalia
- Phylum: Arthropoda
- Class: Insecta
- Order: Lepidoptera
- Superfamily: Noctuoidea
- Family: Erebidae
- Subfamily: Arctiinae
- Genus: Spilosoma
- Species: S. rubidus

Binomial name
- Spilosoma rubidus (Leech, 1890)

Synonyms
- Dionychopus rubidus Leech, 1890; Spilosoma leucoptera Alphéraky, 1897

= Spilosoma rubidus =

Species of moth

Spilosoma rubidus is a moth in the family Erebidae. It was described by John Henry Leech in 1890. It is found in China (Beijing, Hubei, Sichuan, Zhejiang, Shaanxi, Hebei, Jiangxi, Fujian, Hunan, Yunnan, Guizhou, Jilin, Shanxi, Henan, Guangxi, Heilongjiang) and Taiwan.

The Global Lepidoptera Names Index considers Spilosoma rubidus to be a synonym for Spilosoma alba. See Spilarctia alba.
