= Spilosoma immaculata =

Scientific classification
- Domain: Eukaryota
- Kingdom: Animalia
- Phylum: Arthropoda
- Class: Insecta
- Order: Lepidoptera
- Superfamily: Noctuoidea
- Family: Erebidae
- Subfamily: Arctiinae
- Genus: Spilosoma
- Species: S. immaculata

Binomial name
- Spilosoma immaculata Bartel, 1903

Synonyms
- Diacrisia nyangweensis Strand, 1922

Species of moth

Spilosoma immaculata is a moth in the family Erebidae. It was described by Max Bartel in 1903. It is found in Cameroon, the Democratic Republic of the Congo, Ivory Coast, Nigeria, Sierra Leone and South Africa.

== Subspecies ==
- Spilosoma immaculata immaculata
- Spilosoma immaculata nyangweensis (Strand, 1922) (Democratic Republic of the Congo)
