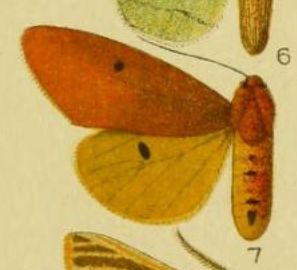

Scientific classification
- Kingdom: Animalia
- Phylum: Arthropoda
- Class: Insecta
- Order: Lepidoptera
- Superfamily: Noctuoidea
- Family: Erebidae
- Subfamily: Arctiinae
- Genus: Spilosoma
- Species: S. togoensis

Binomial name
- Spilosoma togoensis Bartel, 1903

Synonyms
- Spilosoma impunctata Rothschild, 1933; Diacrisia togoensis Rothschild, 1910

= Spilosoma togoensis =

Species of moth

Spilosoma togoensis is a moth in the family Erebidae. It was described by Max Bartel in 1903. It is found in Cameroon, the Central African Republic, the Democratic Republic of the Congo, Equatorial Guinea, Ghana, Ivory Coast, Nigeria and Togo.

== Description ==
=== Male ===
Head, thorax, and abdomen deep orange; palpi with the 3rd joint black; antennae black, except basal joint; tarsi black above; abdomen with dorsal series of black spots except on basal segment, the spot on terminal segment larger, a lateral series of small spots and sublateral series of points except on basal and terminal segments. Forewing fulvous orange with black discoidal point. Hindwing deep orange with elliptical black discoidal spot. Underside orange; forewing with the retinaculum black, both wings with elliptical discoidal spot.

Wingspan 40–43 mm.

== Subspecies ==
- Spilosoma togoensis impunctata Rothschild, 1933
