= Spilosoma danbyi =

Scientific classification
- Kingdom: Animalia
- Phylum: Arthropoda
- Class: Insecta
- Order: Lepidoptera
- Superfamily: Noctuoidea
- Family: Erebidae
- Subfamily: Arctiinae
- Genus: Spilosoma
- Species: S. danbyi

Binomial name
- Spilosoma danbyi (Neumögen & Dyar, 1893)

Synonyms
- Diacrisia rubra var. danbyi Neumoegen & Dyar, 1893

Species of moth

Spilosoma danbyi, or Danby's tiger moth, is a moth in the family Erebidae. It was described by Berthold Neumoegen and Harrison Gray Dyar Jr. in 1893. It is found in North America, where it has been recorded from Washington and western Canada from British Columbia to Manitoba.

The wingspan is about 25 mm. Adults are on wing from May to July.

== Taxonomy ==
The species was formerly considered a synonym of Spilosoma pteridis.
