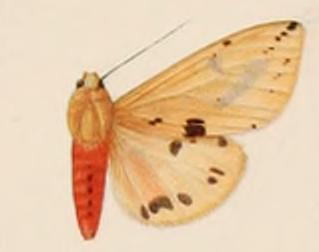

Scientific classification
- Domain: Eukaryota
- Kingdom: Animalia
- Phylum: Arthropoda
- Class: Insecta
- Order: Lepidoptera
- Superfamily: Noctuoidea
- Family: Erebidae
- Subfamily: Arctiinae
- Genus: Spilosoma
- Species: S. roseata

Binomial name
- Spilosoma roseata (Rothschild, 1910)

Synonyms
- Diacrisia roseata Rothschild, 1910; Spilarctia roseata; Spilosoma semperi

= Spilosoma roseata =

Species of moth

Spilosoma roseata is a moth of the family Erebidae. It was described by Walter Rothschild in 1910. It is found on Java in Indonesia.

== Description ==
=== Male ===
Head and thorax pale ochreous; palpi, sides of frons, and antennae black; pectus black; legs black, ochreous at base, the fore coxae and the femora above crimson; abdomen crimson, the base, anal tuft, and ventral surface pale ochreous, dorsal, lateral, and sublateral series of black spots. Forewing pale ochreous; antemedial black points above and below vein 1; a black point in upper angle of cell; a small postmedial black spot below costa, point above vein 2, spot above vein 1, and large spot below it; an oblique series of minute black streaks from apex to vein and subterminal points above and below veins 5 to 3. Hindwing pale ochreous, the inner area tinged with crimson to beyond middle; a black discoidal spot; small subterminal spots below costa and above and below vein 5, and a curved series of larger spots from vein 3 to vein 1. Underside of forewing with the basal half tinged with crimson, an oblique maculate postmedial black band from discal to submedian folds.

=== Female ===
Forewing with postmedial points below vein 3 and above and below vein 2; hindwing without crimson on inner area, the subterminal spots below vein 5 absent; underside of forewing with the oblique maculate band slighter.

The wingspan for the male is 44 mm and for the female 54 mm.

== Taxonomy ==
Lepindex refers to Spilosoma roseata as a synonym for Spilosoma semperi. Lepidoptera and Some Other Life Forms refers to this species as Spliarctia roseata.
