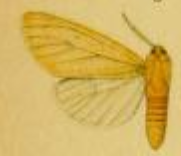
- Estigmene carschi

Scientific classification
- Domain: Eukaryota
- Kingdom: Animalia
- Phylum: Arthropoda
- Class: Insecta
- Order: Lepidoptera
- Superfamily: Noctuoidea
- Family: Erebidae
- Subfamily: Arctiinae
- Genus: Spilosoma
- Species: S. karschi

Binomial name
- Spilosoma karschi Bartel, 1903

Synonyms
- Estigimene carschi Bartel, 1903

= Spilosoma karschi =

Species of moth

Spilosoma karschi is a moth in the family Erebidae. It was described by Max Bartel in 1903. It is found in the Democratic Republic of the Congo, Ghana, Guinea-Bissau, Malawi, Nigeria, Togo and Uganda.

== Description ==
The male's head, thorax, and abdomen are orange yellow. Its antennae are brown with the shaft whitish above. The palpi, pectus, legs, and ventral surface of the abdomen except the terminal segment are brown. Its forewings are uniform yellow and its hindwings are yellowish white.

The female is similar except the forewings and hindwings are orange yellow.

The wingspan of Spilosoma karschi is 32–44 mm.
