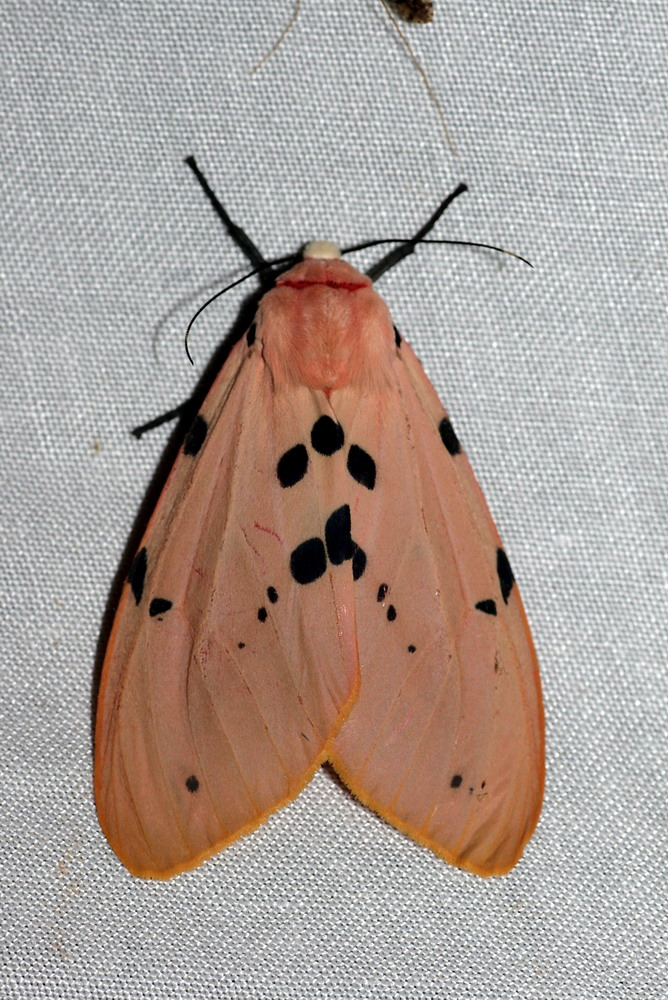

Scientific classification
- Kingdom: Animalia
- Phylum: Arthropoda
- Clade: Pancrustacea
- Class: Insecta
- Order: Lepidoptera
- Superfamily: Noctuoidea
- Family: Erebidae
- Subfamily: Arctiinae
- Genus: Spilarctia
- Species: S. ericsoni

Binomial name
- Spilarctia ericsoni (Semper, 1899)

Synonyms
- Hyarias ericsoni Semper, 1899; Spilosoma ericsoni (Semper, 1899)

= Spilarctia ericsoni =

Species of moth

Spilarctia ericsoni is a moth in the family Erebidae. It was described by Georg Semper in 1899. It is found on Borneo; Semper gave the species the type locality of "Kinabalu-Gebirge" in his original description, where he placed it in the genus Hyarias.

Some sources classify it under the genus Spilosoma.

Females of this species have creamy-coloured forewings and yellow-fringed hindwings. The forewings are more red in the males. Both males and females have two large, black dorsal spots on the forewings.

This moth is generally found at elevations between 1,200 and 1,800 metres (3,900 and 5,900 ft) above sea level and is thought to be common, though at least one specimen was recovered at an elevation of 300 m (980 ft) in Ulu Temburong, Brunei.
