= Spilosoma brunneomixta =

Scientific classification
- Kingdom: Animalia
- Phylum: Arthropoda
- Class: Insecta
- Order: Lepidoptera
- Superfamily: Noctuoidea
- Family: Erebidae
- Subfamily: Arctiinae
- Genus: Spilosoma
- Species: S. brunneomixta

Binomial name
- Spilosoma brunneomixta Toulgoët, 1971

Species of moth

Spilosoma brunneomixta is a moth in the family Erebidae. It was described by Hervé de Toulgoët in 1971. It is found on Madagascar.
