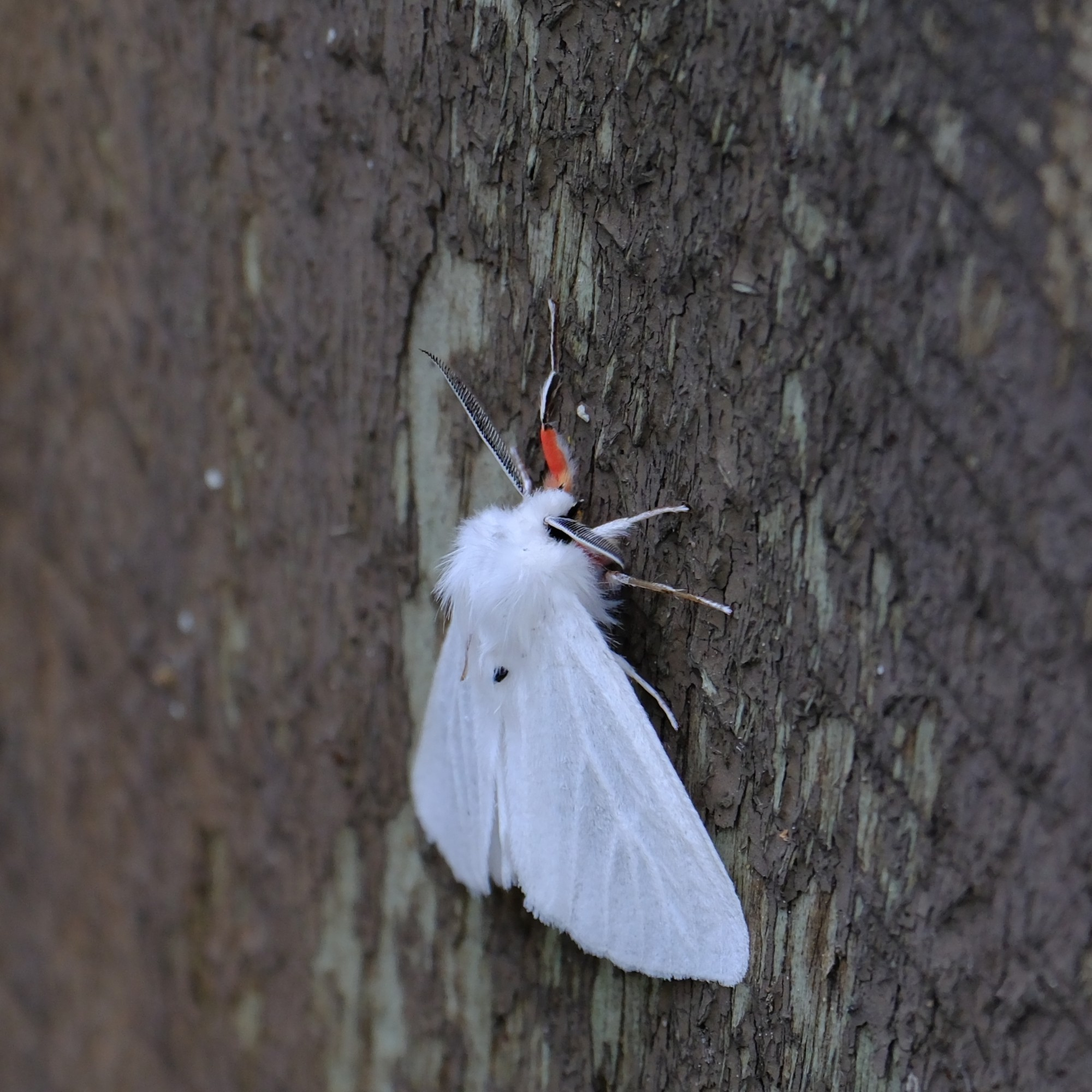
- Adult

Scientific classification
- Kingdom: Animalia
- Phylum: Arthropoda
- Clade: Pancrustacea
- Class: Insecta
- Order: Lepidoptera
- Superfamily: Noctuoidea
- Family: Erebidae
- Subfamily: Arctiinae
- Genus: Spilosoma
- Species: S. latipennis

Binomial name
- Spilosoma latipennis Stretch, 1872

Synonyms
- Diacrisia latipennis

= Spilosoma latipennis =

Species of moth

Spilosoma latipennis, the pink-legged tiger moth, or the red-legged diacrisia, is a moth in the family Erebidae. It was described by Richard Harper Stretch in 1872. It is found in eastern North America, where it has been recorded from Georgia, Indiana, Iowa, Kansas, Kentucky, Maine, Maryland, New Brunswick, New York, North Carolina, Ohio, Ontario, Pennsylvania, South Carolina, West Virginia and Wisconsin.

The wingspan is about 38 mm. Adults are on wing from April to September.

The larvae feed on various plants, including ash trees, dandelions, impatiens and plantain.

== External References ==
- Beccaloni, G.; Scoble, M.; Kitching, I.; Simonsen, T.; Robinson, G.; Pitkin, B.; Hine, A.; Lyal, C., eds. (2003). "Spilosoma latipennis". The Global Lepidoptera Names Index. Natural History Museum.
- Spilosoma latipennis at BOLD
