= Spilosoma flavidior =

Scientific classification
- Domain: Eukaryota
- Kingdom: Animalia
- Phylum: Arthropoda
- Class: Insecta
- Order: Lepidoptera
- Superfamily: Noctuoidea
- Family: Erebidae
- Subfamily: Arctiinae
- Genus: Spilosoma
- Species: S. flavidior

Binomial name
- Spilosoma flavidior Gaede, 1923

Species of moth

Spilosoma flavidior is a moth in the family Erebidae. It was described by Max Gaede in 1923. It is found in the Afrotropics.
