= Spilosoma pseudambrensis =

Scientific classification
- Kingdom: Animalia
- Phylum: Arthropoda
- Clade: Pancrustacea
- Class: Insecta
- Order: Lepidoptera
- Superfamily: Noctuoidea
- Family: Erebidae
- Subfamily: Arctiinae
- Genus: Spilosoma
- Species: S. pseudambrensis

Binomial name
- Spilosoma pseudambrensis (Toulgoët, 1961)

Synonyms
- Spilarctia pseuambrensis Toulgoët, 1961

Species of moth

Spilosoma pseudambrensis is a moth in the family Erebidae. It was described by Hervé de Toulgoët in 1961. It is found on Madagascar.
