= Spilosoma tenuivena =

Scientific classification
- Kingdom: Animalia
- Phylum: Arthropoda
- Class: Insecta
- Order: Lepidoptera
- Superfamily: Noctuoidea
- Family: Erebidae
- Subfamily: Arctiinae
- Genus: Spilosoma
- Species: S. tenuivena

Binomial name
- Spilosoma tenuivena Kiriakoff, 1965

Species of moth

Spilosoma tenuivena is a moth in the family Erebidae. It was described by Sergius G. Kiriakoff in 1965. It is found in the Democratic Republic of the Congo.
