= Spilosoma jordani =

Scientific classification
- Domain: Eukaryota
- Kingdom: Animalia
- Phylum: Arthropoda
- Class: Insecta
- Order: Lepidoptera
- Superfamily: Noctuoidea
- Family: Erebidae
- Subfamily: Arctiinae
- Genus: Spilosoma
- Species: S. jordani

Binomial name
- Spilosoma jordani Debauche, 1938

Species of moth

Spilosoma jordani is a moth in the family Erebidae. It was described by Hubert Robert Debauche in 1938. It is found in the Central African Republic.
