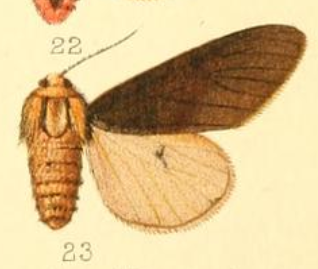

Scientific classification
- Kingdom: Animalia
- Phylum: Arthropoda
- Class: Insecta
- Order: Lepidoptera
- Superfamily: Noctuoidea
- Family: Erebidae
- Subfamily: Arctiinae
- Genus: Spilosoma
- Species: S. fuscipennis

Binomial name
- Spilosoma fuscipennis Hampson, 1894

Synonyms
- Spilosoma fuscipenne Hampson, 1894; Diacrisia fuscipennis Hampson, 1901

= Spilosoma fuscipennis =

Species of moth

Spilosoma fuscipennis is a moth in the family Erebidae. It was described by George Hampson in 1894. It is found in the Himalayas.

== Description ==
=== Female ===
Antennae with the branches very short; thorax and abdomen dark reddish brown; palpi, frons at sides, and antennae black; legs streaked with blackish; abdomen with dorsal, lateral, and sublateral series of blackish points. Forewing fuscous brown; an indistinct curved antemedial line; an obscure discoidal point; the indistinct postmedial line angled at lower angle of cell, then strongly incurved. Hindwing pale greyish brown, with obscure discoidal point.

The female's wingspan is 48 mm.
