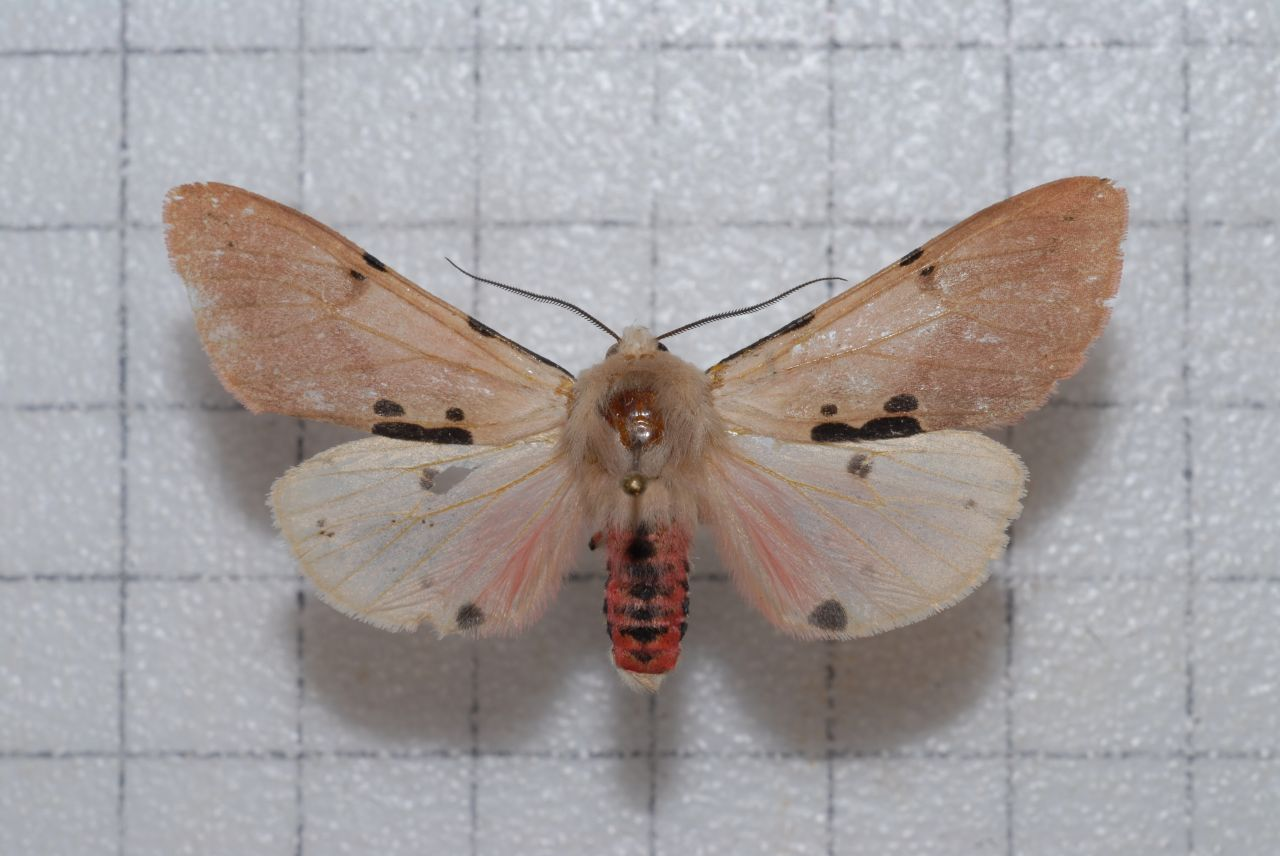

Scientific classification
- Domain: Eukaryota
- Kingdom: Animalia
- Phylum: Arthropoda
- Class: Insecta
- Order: Lepidoptera
- Superfamily: Noctuoidea
- Family: Erebidae
- Subfamily: Arctiinae
- Genus: Spilosoma
- Species: S. clava

Binomial name
- Spilosoma clava (Wileman, 1910)

Synonyms
- Diacrisia clava Wileman, 1910; Spilarctia clava

= Spilosoma clava =

Species of moth

Spilosoma clava is a species of moth of the family Erebidae. It was described by Alfred Ernest Wileman in 1910. It is found in Taiwan.

== Description ==
=== Female ===
Head white tinged with buff; palpi crimson at base, black at tips; frons at sides and antennae black; thorax brown buff, the patagia with black spots; pectus dark brown in front; crimson streaks below the wings; the fore coxae and femora above crimson, the tibiae and tarsi black above; abdomen crimson, the base, tip of anal tuft and ventral surface buff, a dorsal series of black bands except at base, lateral series of spots and sublateral spots on medial segments. Pore wing buff suffused with brown except at base; a black fascia on basal third of costa; a black fascia on middle of inner margin with ante- and postmedial black spots above it above vein 1; a small spot at upper angle of cell and elongate spot above it on costa; an oblique series of black points from apex to below vein 0, then an oblique brownish line to the postmedial spot above vein 1; subterminal black points above veins 1 and 3. Hindwing pale buff, the inner area slightly tinged with purplish crimson; a black discoidal spot and subterminal spots at discal told, below vein 2 and above and below vein 1. Underside of forewing with the basal half and costal area tc towards apex suffused with crimson.

Wingspan 58 mm.
