= Spilosoma virgulae =

Scientific classification
- Kingdom: Animalia
- Phylum: Arthropoda
- Clade: Pancrustacea
- Class: Insecta
- Order: Lepidoptera
- Superfamily: Noctuoidea
- Family: Erebidae
- Subfamily: Arctiinae
- Genus: Spilosoma
- Species: S. virgulae

Binomial name
- Spilosoma virgulae Černý, 2011

Synonyms
- Spilarctia virgulae Černý, 2011

Species of moth

Spilosoma virgulae is a moth in the family Erebidae. It was described by Karel Černý in 2011. It is found in the Philippines.
