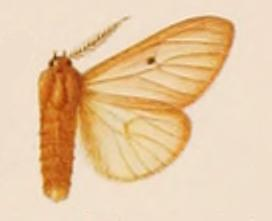

Scientific classification
- Kingdom: Animalia
- Phylum: Arthropoda
- Class: Insecta
- Order: Lepidoptera
- Superfamily: Noctuoidea
- Family: Erebidae
- Subfamily: Arctiinae
- Genus: Spilosoma
- Species: S. pellucida

Binomial name
- Spilosoma pellucida (Rothschild, 1910)

Synonyms
- Diacrisia pellucida Rothschild, 1910

= Spilosoma pellucida =

Species of moth

Spilosoma pellucida is a moth of the family Erebidae. It was described by Walter Rothschild in 1910. It is found in Ghana.

== Description ==
=== Male ===
Head and thorax ochreous with a fulvous tinge; antennae with the branches brown; abdomen pale yellow with a fulvous tinge. Forewing hyaline, the veins, costal and inner areas brownish ochreous; a small round black discoidal spot. Hindwing hyaline, the veins, costal and inner areas, and the termen ochreous.

Wingspan 38 mm.
