= Spilosoma feifensis =

Scientific classification
- Kingdom: Animalia
- Phylum: Arthropoda
- Class: Insecta
- Order: Lepidoptera
- Superfamily: Noctuoidea
- Family: Erebidae
- Subfamily: Arctiinae
- Genus: Spilosoma
- Species: S. feifensis

Binomial name
- Spilosoma feifensis Wiltshire, 1986

Species of moth

Spilosoma feifensis is a moth in the family Erebidae. It was described by Wiltshire in 1986. It is found in Saudi Arabia.
