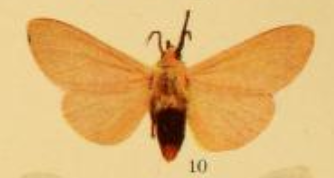

Scientific classification
- Kingdom: Animalia
- Phylum: Arthropoda
- Clade: Pancrustacea
- Class: Insecta
- Order: Lepidoptera
- Superfamily: Noctuoidea
- Family: Erebidae
- Subfamily: Arctiinae
- Genus: Spilosoma
- Species: S. nigrocincta

Binomial name
- Spilosoma nigrocincta (Kenrick, 1914)

Synonyms
- Diacrisia nigrocincta Kenrick, 1914

= Spilosoma nigrocincta =

Species of moth

Spilosoma nigrocincta is a moth in the family Erebidae. It was described by George Hamilton Kenrick in 1914. It is found in Madagascar.

== Description ==
Head, thorax, and abdomen orange, antennae, palpi, and legs black, paired black spots on underside of the abdomen, the four middle segments on the upperside black in both sexes. Wings pale orange without markings.

Wingspan for the male 50 mm. and for the female 60 mm.
