= Spilosoma nyasana =

Scientific classification
- Domain: Eukaryota
- Kingdom: Animalia
- Phylum: Arthropoda
- Class: Insecta
- Order: Lepidoptera
- Superfamily: Noctuoidea
- Family: Erebidae
- Subfamily: Arctiinae
- Genus: Spilosoma
- Species: S. nyasana

Binomial name
- Spilosoma nyasana Rothschild, 1933

Species of moth

Spilosoma nyasana is a moth in the family Erebidae. It was described by Rothschild in 1933. It is found in the Democratic Republic of Congo, Kenya and Malawi.
