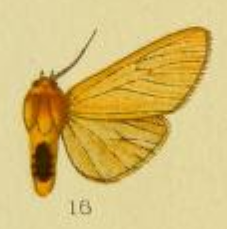

Scientific classification
- Domain: Eukaryota
- Kingdom: Animalia
- Phylum: Arthropoda
- Class: Insecta
- Order: Lepidoptera
- Superfamily: Noctuoidea
- Family: Erebidae
- Subfamily: Arctiinae
- Genus: Spilosoma
- Species: S. pales

Binomial name
- Spilosoma pales (H. Druce, 1910)

Synonyms
- Diacrisia pales H. Druce, 1910

= Spilosoma pales =

Species of moth

Spilosoma pales is a moth in the family Erebidae. It was described by Herbert Druce in 1910. It is found in Kenya, Tanzania and Uganda.

== Description ==
The male was described as: head and thorax deep orange, on the latter shading to yellow behind; palpi black except at base; antennae black; fore femora except above and the tibiae and tarsi black; abdomen orange yellow with large dorsal black patch except on basal and terminal segments, extending at middle to the lateral line, and a ventral grey patch except on basal and terminal segments. Forewing uniform yellow. Hindwing pale semihyaline (almost-glassy) yellow; the underside with the costal area deeper yellow.

Wingspan 48 mm.
