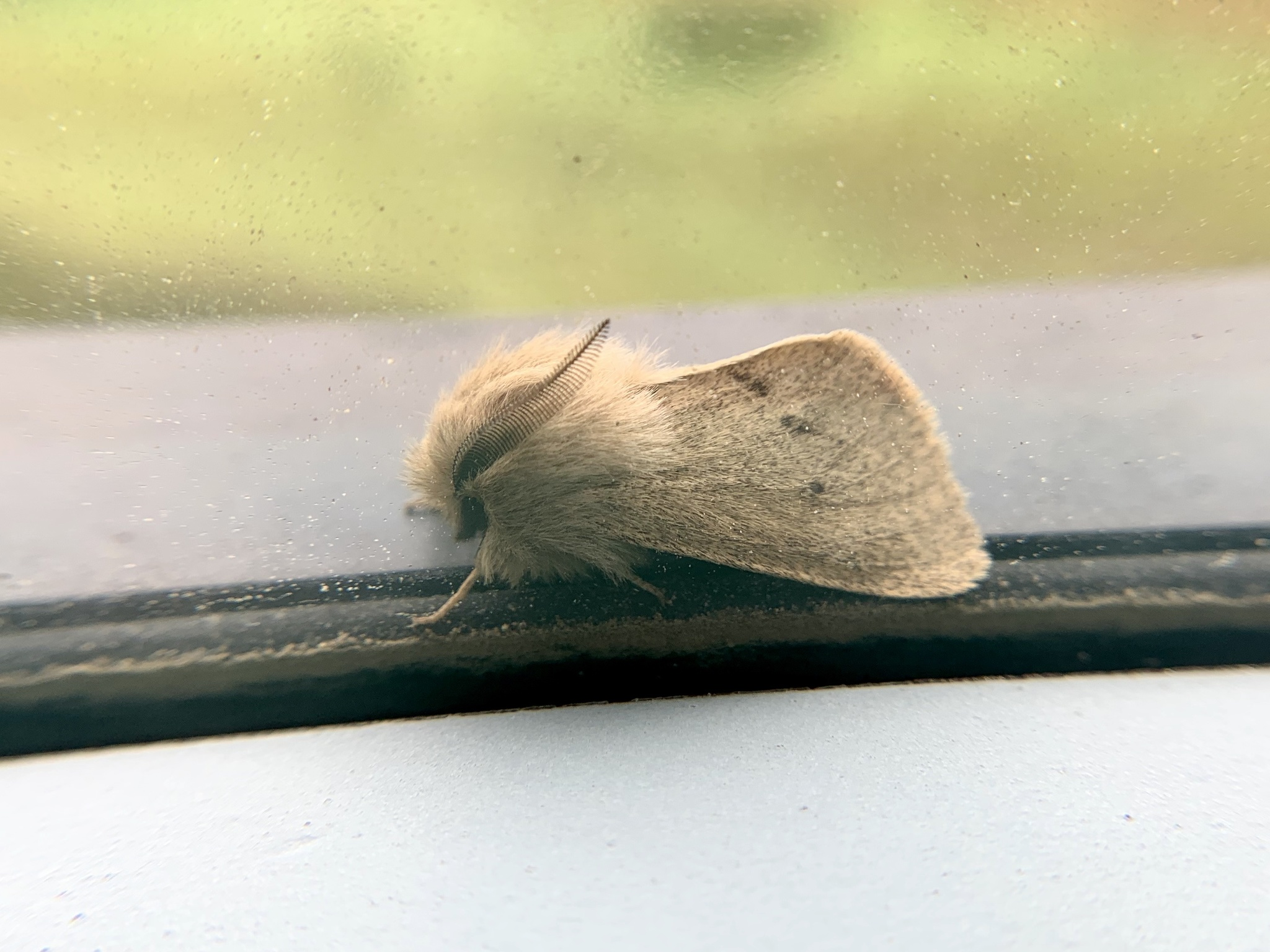

Scientific classification
- Domain: Eukaryota
- Kingdom: Animalia
- Phylum: Arthropoda
- Class: Insecta
- Order: Lepidoptera
- Superfamily: Noctuoidea
- Family: Erebidae
- Subfamily: Arctiinae
- Genus: Spilosoma
- Species: S. vagans

Binomial name
- Spilosoma vagans (Boisduval, 1852)

Synonyms
- Arctia vagans Boisduval, 1852; Nemeophila rufula Boisduval, 1855; Rhagonis bicolor Walker, 1862; Antarctia punctata Packard, 1864; Antarctia punctata var. proba H. Edwards, 1881; Antarctia walsinghamii Butler, 1881; Diacrisia kasloa Dyar, 1904

= Spilosoma vagans =

Species of moth

Spilosoma vagans, the wandering diacrisia or wandering tiger moth, is a moth in the family Erebidae. It was described by Jean Baptiste Boisduval in 1852. It is found in western North America, from southern California, southern Utah and central Colorado north to southern British Columbia and south-western Alberta. The habitat consists of drier forests, including open ponderosa pine forests and mixed hardwood-conifer forests.

The length of the forewings is 14–18 mm. Adults are on wing from late April to early August.

The larvae feed various herbaceous plants.

== Subspecies ==
- Spilosoma vagans vagans
- Spilosoma vagans kasloa (Dyar, 1904)
