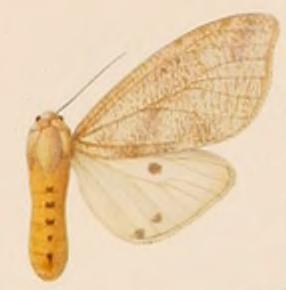

Scientific classification
- Kingdom: Animalia
- Phylum: Arthropoda
- Class: Insecta
- Order: Lepidoptera
- Superfamily: Noctuoidea
- Family: Erebidae
- Subfamily: Arctiinae
- Genus: Spilosoma
- Species: S. batesi

Binomial name
- Spilosoma batesi (Rothschild, 1910)

Synonyms
- Teracotona batesi Rothschild, 1910

= Spilosoma batesi =

Species of moth

Spilosoma batesi is a moth of the family Erebidae. It was described by Walter Rothschild in 1910. It is found in Nigeria, Cameroon, Congo and Zaire.

== Description ==
Female

Head and thorax yellowish white, the tegulae with black points, the patagia with black spots; palpi except at base, lower part of frons and antennæ fuscous; legs tinged with brown; abdomen yellow with dorsal series of black spots except at base and extremity and lateral series of spots, the ventral surface white with small sublateral black spots on terminal segments. Forewing ochreous white thickly striated with pale red-brown; faint brown marks at middle of cell and on upper discocellular and an oblique medial shade from cell to inner margin: a faint oblique shade from costa just before apex to discal fold and oblique shade from vein 2 to inner margin. Hindwing white; a round fuscous discoidal spot, a subterminal spot below vein 2 and spot at extremity of vein 1.

Type female in Coll. Rothschild. Exp. 48 mm.
