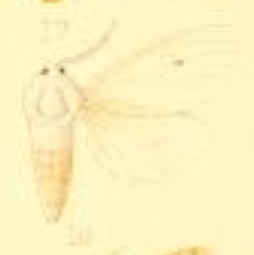

Scientific classification
- Kingdom: Animalia
- Phylum: Arthropoda
- Clade: Pancrustacea
- Class: Insecta
- Order: Lepidoptera
- Superfamily: Noctuoidea
- Family: Erebidae
- Subfamily: Arctiinae
- Genus: Spilosoma
- Species: S. jussiaeae

Binomial name
- Spilosoma jussiaeae (Poey, 1832)

Synonyms
- Arctia jussiaeae Poey, 1832; Diacrisia jussiaeae

= Spilosoma jussiaeae =

Species of moth

Spilosoma jussiaeae is a moth in the family Erebidae. It was described by Felipe Poey in 1832. It is found on Cuba.

== Description ==
Pure white; palpi and fore tibiae streaked with black; tarsi ringed with black; femora orange above; abdomen with dorsal series of black points; diffused orange lateral fasciæ. Forewing with black point at lower angle of cell.

Hab. Cuba (Ruiz), 2 M, 3 F . The wingspan of the male is 32 mm and the female 40 mm.
