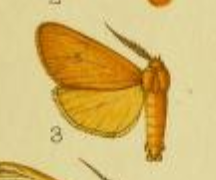
- Catalogue of the Lepidoptera Phalænæ in the British museum (1920)

Scientific classification
- Kingdom: Animalia
- Phylum: Arthropoda
- Class: Insecta
- Order: Lepidoptera
- Superfamily: Noctuoidea
- Family: Erebidae
- Subfamily: Arctiinae
- Genus: Spilosoma
- Species: S. crossi

Binomial name
- Spilosoma crossi (Rothschild, 1910)

Synonyms
- Diacrisia crossi Rothschild, 1910

= Spilosoma crossi =

Species of moth

Spilosoma crossi is a moth in the family Erebidae. It was described by Rothschild in 1910. It is found in Nigeria and Gambia.

== Description ==
Diacrisia crossi, Eoths. Nov. Zool. xvii. p. 141 (1910).

(Male) Head and thorax ochreous tinged with brown; antennae black-brown; palpi, pectus, and legs dark reddish brown, some yellow hair below shoulders, the femora yellow above; abdomen orange-yellow with brownish dorsal streak except on terminal segments, the ventral surface red-brown. Fore wing ochreous tinged with red-brown. Hind wing pale ochreous yellow, the underside tinged with red-brown except on inner area.

Hab. Gambia, Bathurst; S. Nigeria, Assaba (Crosse), type male in Coll. Rothschild. Exp. 32 millim.
