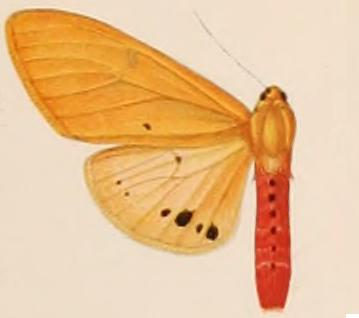
- Male
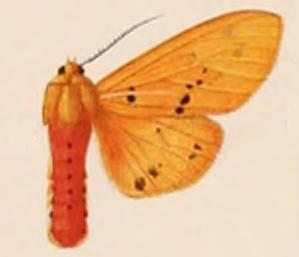
- Female

Scientific classification
- Kingdom: Animalia
- Phylum: Arthropoda
- Clade: Pancrustacea
- Class: Insecta
- Order: Lepidoptera
- Superfamily: Noctuoidea
- Family: Erebidae
- Subfamily: Arctiinae
- Genus: Spilosoma
- Species: S. eldorado

Binomial name
- Spilosoma eldorado (Rothschild, 1910)

Synonyms
- Diacrisia eldorado Rothschild, 1910; Spilarctia eldorado Singh, Singh & Joshi, 2014

= Spilosoma eldorado =

Species of moth

Spilosoma eldorado is a moth of the family Erebidae. It was described by Walter Rothschild in 1910. It is found in eastern India and Sri Lanka.

== Description ==
=== Male ===
Head and thorax orange yellow; palpi crimson, black at tips; sides of frons and antennae black; pectus black in front and with some crimson below the wings; fore coxae and the femora above crimson, the tibiae and tarsi black; abdomen crimson, the ventral surface ochreous, dorsal, lateral, and sublateral series of small black spots except at base and extremity. Forewing orange yellow; small antemedial black spots below median nervure and above vein 1; an incurved postmedial series of small black spots from vein 3 to inner margin. Hindwing crimson; a black discoidal point; small subterminal black spots above and below veins 5, 2. and 1; cilia yellow. Underside of forewing with the basal half suffused with crimson, black stripe on each side of discocellulars, and an oblique postmedial series of black spots and points from above vein 6 to below vein 2; hindwing ochreous yellow, the basal half of costal area and inner area suffused with crimson, a black point below base of costa.

=== Female ===
Head, thorax, and forewing ochreous yellow, the last with postmedial black point above vein 1 only; hindwing pale yellow; underside of forewing with black discoidal spot and postmedial spots above and below vein 5.

Wingspan for the male 44 mm and for the female 54 mm.
