= Spilosoma semialbescens =

Scientific classification
- Domain: Eukaryota
- Kingdom: Animalia
- Phylum: Arthropoda
- Class: Insecta
- Order: Lepidoptera
- Superfamily: Noctuoidea
- Family: Erebidae
- Subfamily: Arctiinae
- Genus: Spilosoma
- Species: S. semialbescens

Binomial name
- Spilosoma semialbescens Talbot, 1929

Synonyms
- Spilarctia semialbescens

Species of moth

Spilosoma semialbescens is a moth in the family Erebidae. It was described by George Talbot in 1929. It is found on Seram Island in Indonesia.
