= Spilosoma pelopea =

Scientific classification
- Domain: Eukaryota
- Kingdom: Animalia
- Phylum: Arthropoda
- Class: Insecta
- Order: Lepidoptera
- Superfamily: Noctuoidea
- Family: Erebidae
- Subfamily: Arctiinae
- Genus: Spilosoma
- Species: S. pelopea

Binomial name
- Spilosoma pelopea (H. Druce, 1897)

Synonyms
- Euchaetes pelopea H. Druce, 1897; Diacrisia pelopea

Species of moth

Spilosoma pelopea is a moth in the family Erebidae. It was described by Herbert Druce in 1897. It is found in Mexico.
