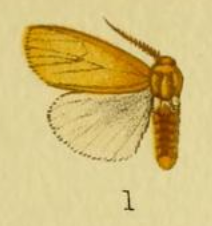

Scientific classification
- Kingdom: Animalia
- Phylum: Arthropoda
- Class: Insecta
- Order: Lepidoptera
- Superfamily: Noctuoidea
- Family: Erebidae
- Subfamily: Arctiinae
- Genus: Spilosoma
- Species: S. metaleuca

Binomial name
- Spilosoma metaleuca (Hampson, 1905)

Synonyms
- Diacrisia metaleuca Hampson, 1905

= Spilosoma metaleuca =

Species of moth

Spilosoma metaleuca is a moth in the family Erebidae. It was described by George Hampson in 1905. It is found in the Democratic Republic of the Congo, Eritrea, Nigeria and Sudan.

== Description ==
Head and thorax orange yellow; abdomen orange yellow, white at base and with ill-defined dorsal fuscous hands. Forewing uniform orange yellow. Hindwing pure white.

The wingspan for the male is 28 mm and the female is 36 mm.
