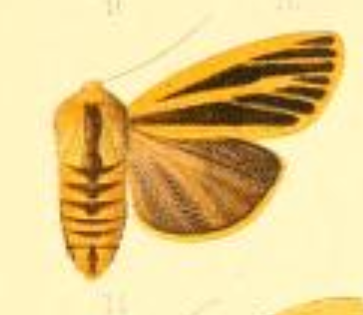

Scientific classification
- Kingdom: Animalia
- Phylum: Arthropoda
- Class: Insecta
- Order: Lepidoptera
- Superfamily: Noctuoidea
- Family: Erebidae
- Subfamily: Arctiinae
- Genus: Spilosoma
- Species: S. latiradiata

Binomial name
- Spilosoma latiradiata (Hampson, 1901)

Synonyms
- Diacrisia latiradiata Hampson, 1901

= Spilosoma latiradiata =

Species of moth

Spilosoma latiradiata is a moth in the family Erebidae. It was described by George Hampson in 1901. It is found in South Africa and Zambia.

== Description of the female ==
Head and thorax yellow tinged with olive brown; palpi, lower part of frons, antennae, a broad stripe on vertex of thorax, pectus, and legs deep black; abdomen orange above, with segmental black bands expanding into dorsal spots, a lateral series of black spots connected with the black ventral surface which has a series of orange spots reduced towards extremity. Forewing fulvous orange, with deep black fascia nearly filling the cell, submedian interspace, and the interspaces beyond the cell; a slight postmedial black streak above inner margin. Hindwing fuscous black, the base yellowish, the cilia yellow.

It has a wingspan of 46 mm.
