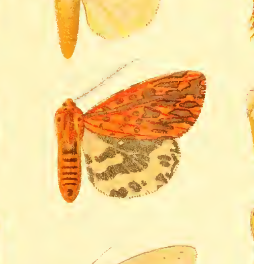

Scientific classification
- Kingdom: Animalia
- Phylum: Arthropoda
- Class: Insecta
- Order: Lepidoptera
- Superfamily: Noctuoidea
- Family: Erebidae
- Subfamily: Arctiinae
- Genus: Spilosoma
- Species: S. erythrophleps

Binomial name
- Spilosoma erythrophleps Hampson, 1894

= Spilosoma erythrophleps =

Species of moth

Spilosoma erythrophleps is a moth in the Erebidae family. It was described by George Hampson in 1894. It is found in Assam, India.

== Description ==
Head, thorax, and abdomen reddish orange; palpi and frons black; collar and tegulae with paired black spots; abdomen with dorsal black bands and a patch on the terminal segment. Forewing orange, the veins scarlet; numerous black spots in the interspaces; a black streak from base through the cell to near outer margin. Hindwing is pale ochreous; medial and postmedial maculate black bands conjoined into a large patch in the cell; there is a marginal series of spots with one inside it on vein 5.

Its habitat is in the Naga Hills at 6,000 feet (1,800 m) (Doherty). Wingspan 52 mm.
