= Spilosoma daitoensis =

Scientific classification
- Kingdom: Animalia
- Phylum: Arthropoda
- Clade: Pancrustacea
- Class: Insecta
- Order: Lepidoptera
- Superfamily: Noctuoidea
- Family: Erebidae
- Subfamily: Arctiinae
- Genus: Spilosoma
- Species: S. daitoensis

Binomial name
- Spilosoma daitoensis Matsumura, 1930

Species of moth

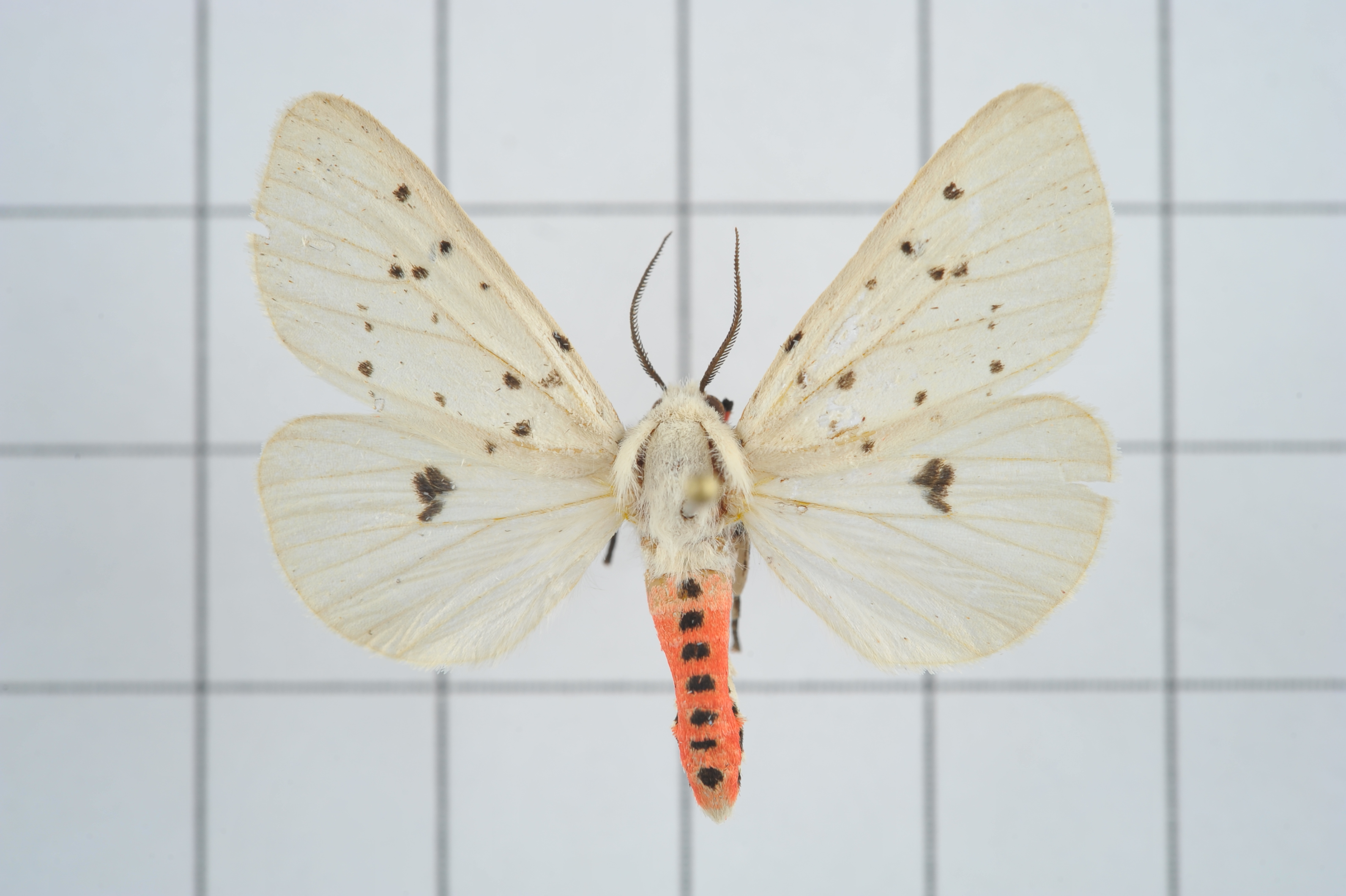
Spilosoma daitoensis

Spilosoma daitoensis is a moth in the family Erebidae. It was described by Shōnen Matsumura in 1930. It is found in Taiwan.
