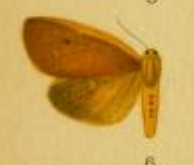
- Female

Scientific classification
- Kingdom: Animalia
- Phylum: Arthropoda
- Class: Insecta
- Order: Lepidoptera
- Superfamily: Noctuoidea
- Family: Erebidae
- Subfamily: Arctiinae
- Genus: Spilosoma
- Species: S. gynephaea

Binomial name
- Spilosoma gynephaea (Hampson, 1901)

Synonyms
- Estigmene gynephaea Hampson, 1901

= Spilosoma gynephaea =

Species of moth

Spilosoma gynephaea is a moth in the family Erebidae. It was described by George Hampson in 1901. It is found in South Africa and Zimbabwe.

== Description ==
=== Male ===
Head orange; palpi and antennae blackish; thorax pale yellow; pectus and legs grey, the latter with the femora orange above; abdomen orange with dorsal and lateral series of black spots except on 1st segment, the ventral surface grey white. Forewing yellow, the veins finely streaked with black except on costal area. Hindwing pale yellow.

=== Female ===
Head and thorax deep orange; pectus, legs, and ventral surface of abdomen fuscous. Forewing orange brown, the costal area to beyond middle, the inner margin finely, and the cilia orange; a black point at lower angle of cell. Hindwing fuscous black; a diffused orange streak on median nervure; the inner margin and cilia orange; an orange discoidal point; the underside orange with large fuscous patch on terminal area from costa to vein 2.

The wingspan of the male is 36 mm and the female is 38 mm.
