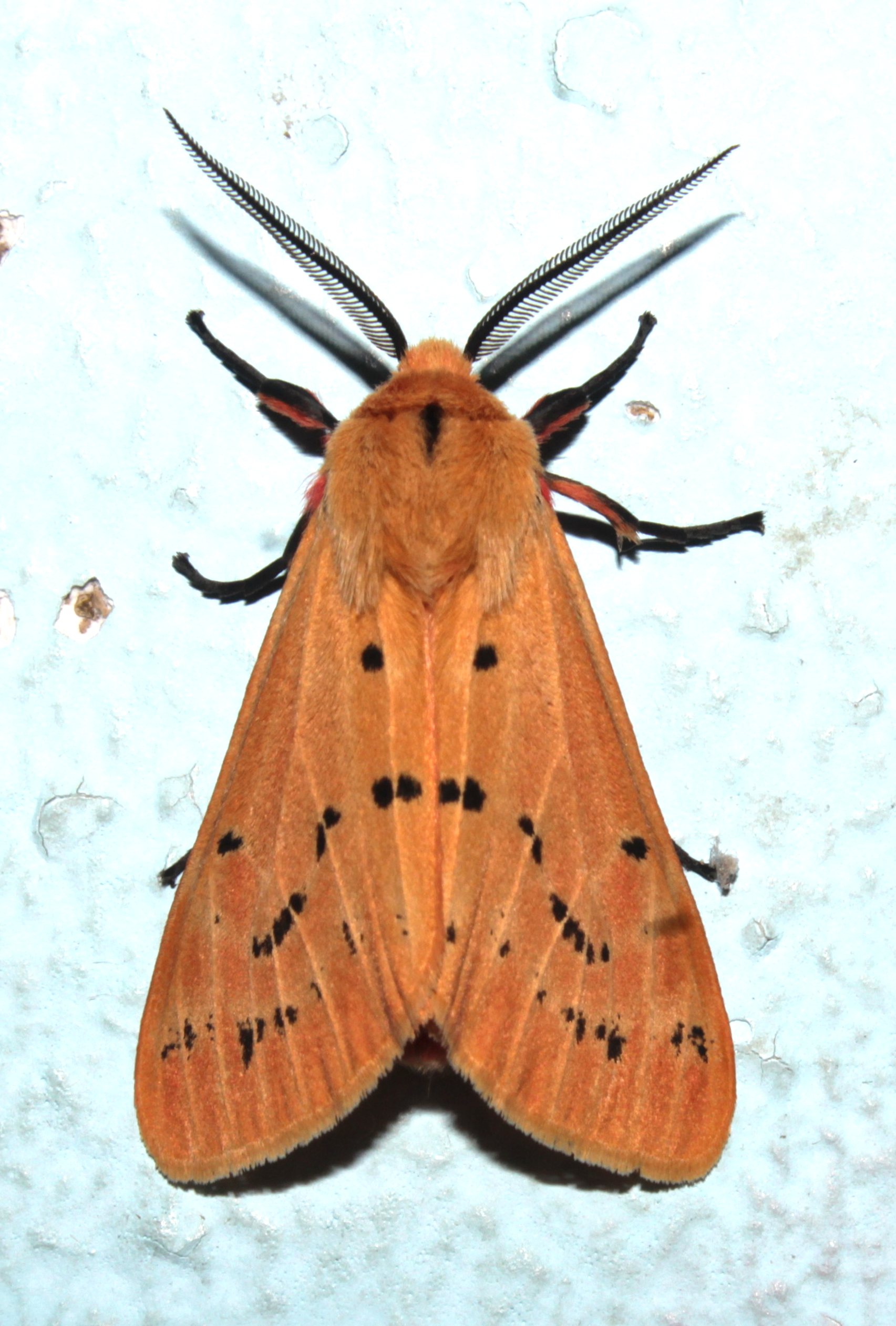
- Moth
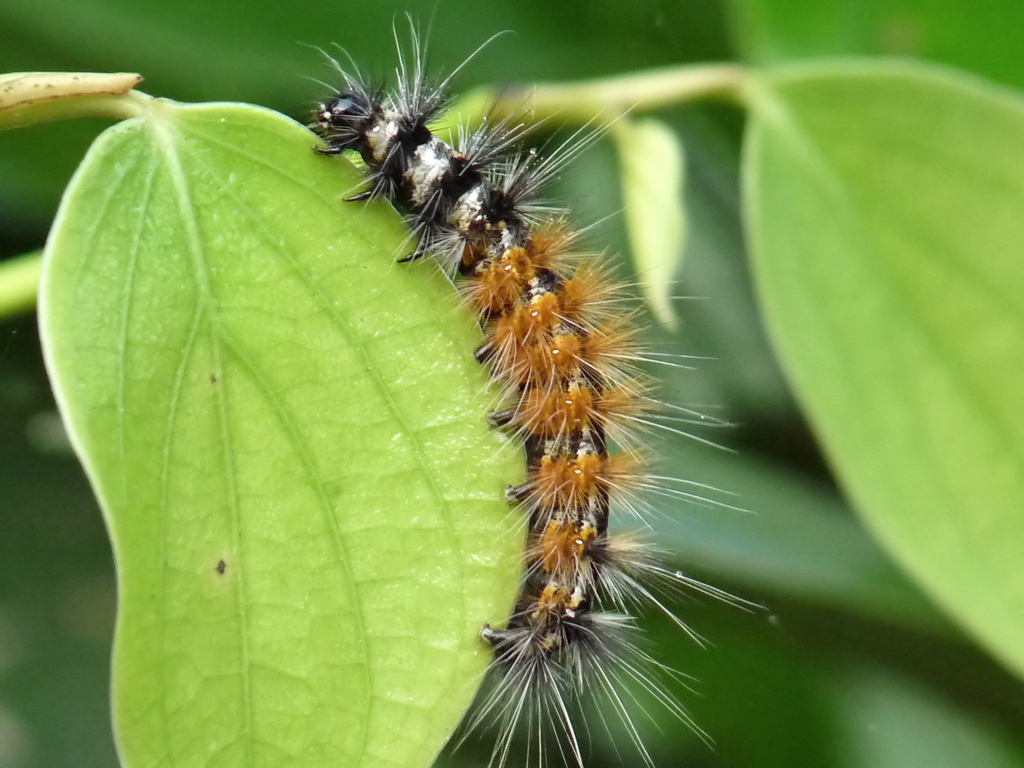
- Caterpillar

Scientific classification
- Kingdom: Animalia
- Phylum: Arthropoda
- Class: Insecta
- Order: Lepidoptera
- Superfamily: Noctuoidea
- Family: Erebidae
- Subfamily: Arctiinae
- Genus: Spilosoma
- Species: S. obliqua

Binomial name
- Spilosoma obliqua (Walker, 1855)

Synonyms
- Spilarctia obliqua; Diacrisia obliqua; Spilosoma suffusa Walker, 1855; Spilosoma dentilinea Moore, 1872; Spilarctia confusa Butler, 1875; Spilarctia howra Moore, 1879; Diacrisia assamensis Rothschild, 1910; ?Spilarctia nydia Butler, 1875; ?Spilarctia bifascia Hampson, 1891; Arctia indica Guérin-Méneville, 1843; Lemyra indica; Arctia montana Guérin-Méneville, 1843

= Spilosoma obliqua =

Species of moth

Spilosoma obliqua, the jute hairy caterpillar or Bihar hairy caterpillar, is a moth of the family Erebidae. It is found in south-eastern Afghanistan, northern Pakistan, India, Bhutan, Bangladesh and Myanmar.

== Subspecies ==
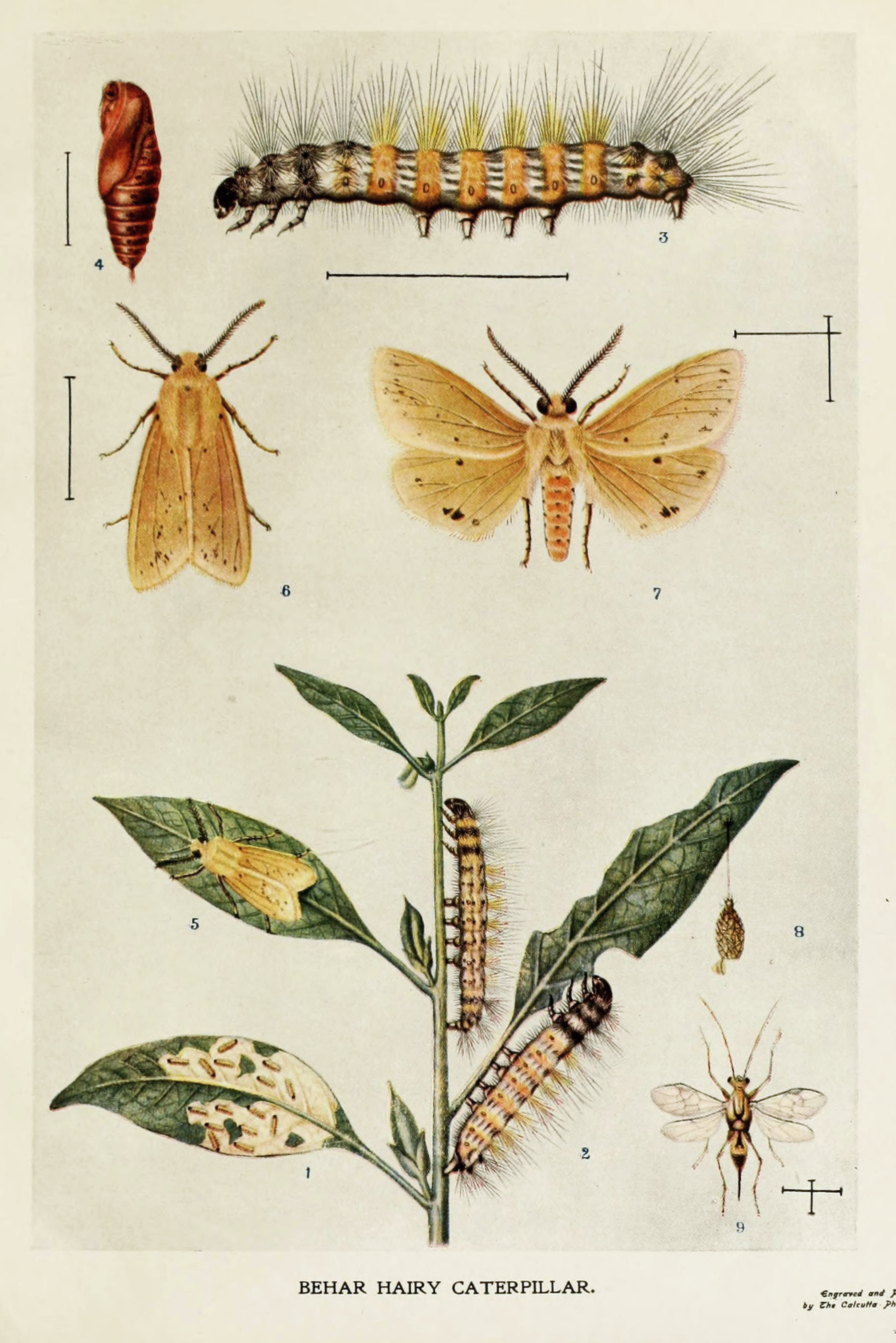
Spilosoma obliqua

- Spilarctia obliqua obliqua (Walker, 1855) (south-eastern Afghanistan, northern Pakistan, India, Bhutan, Bangladesh, Burma)
- Spilarctia obliqua montana (Guérin-Méneville, 1843) (southern India)

== Description ==
The caterpillar has a black head, tufts of black hairs behind this, and similar tufts of yellow hairs on the remaining portion. The adult wingspan is about 23 mm (0.9 in). The wings are a pale brown colour with a pattern of small black specks, and the abdomen is red.

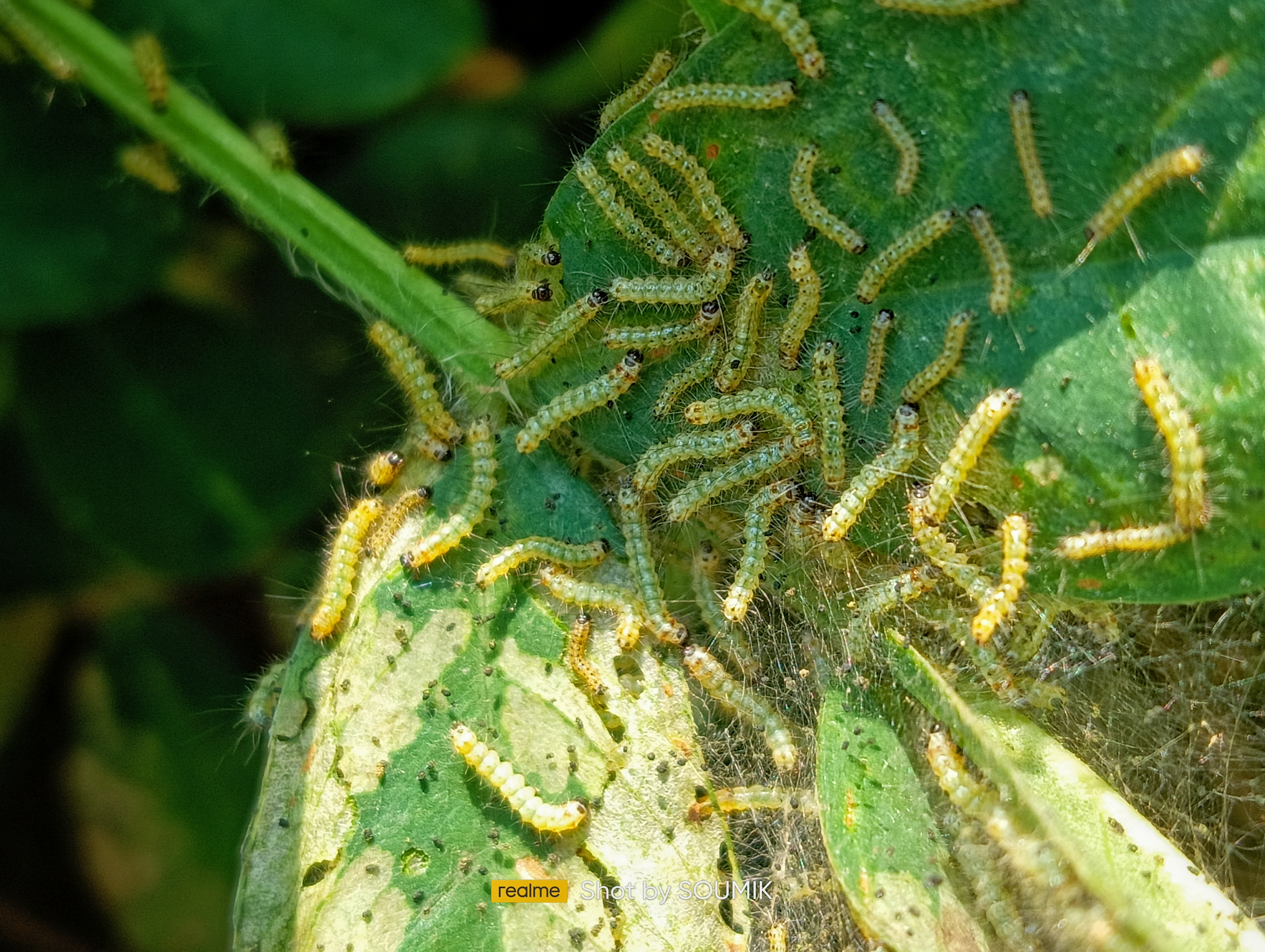
Bihar hairy caterpillar

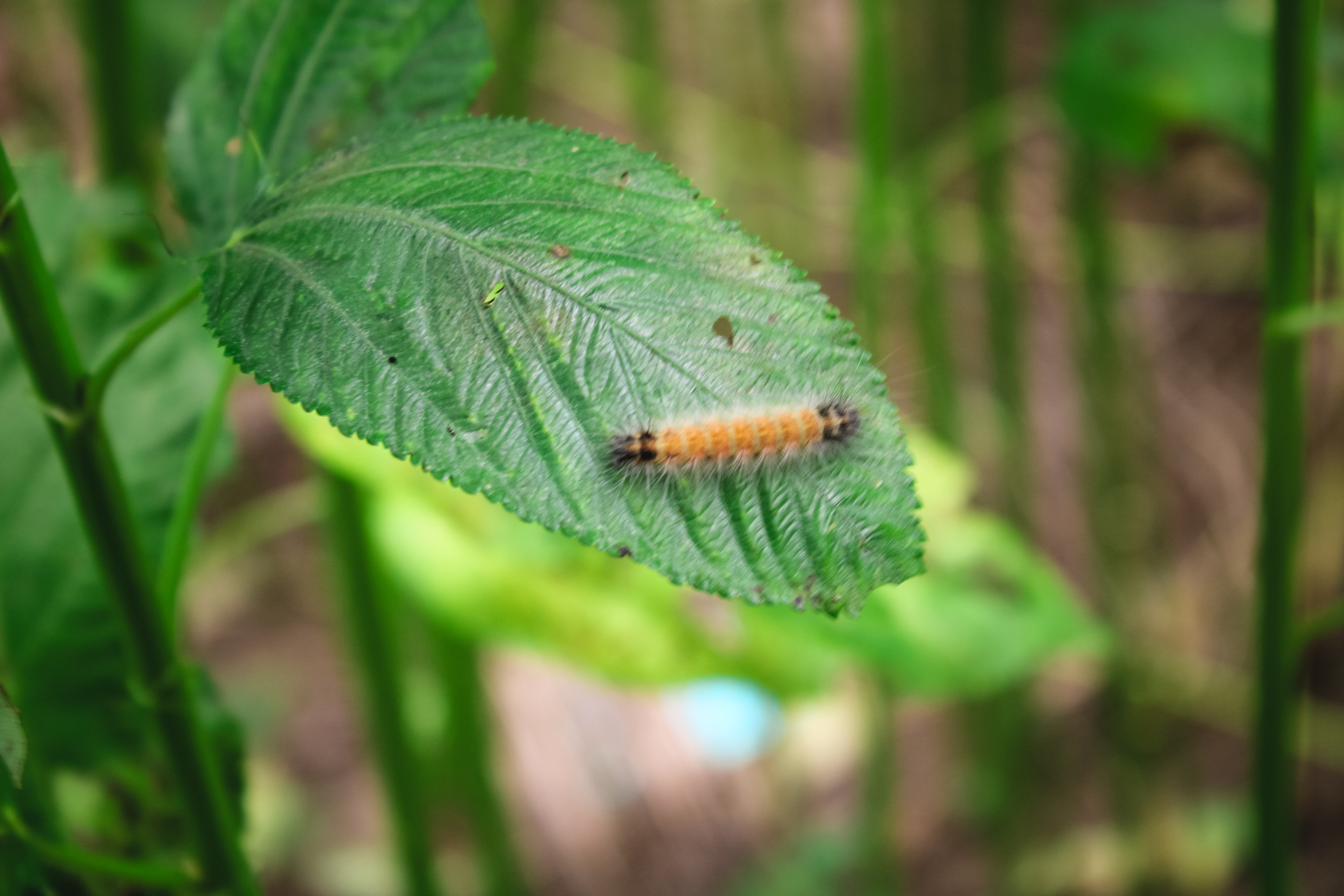
Jute hairy caterpillar in Rajbari

== Host plants ==
Spilosoma obliqua is polyphagous and feeds on at least 126 species of plant including pulses, cereals, vegetables, oilseeds, mulberry, turmeric, fibre crops such as jute, roselle, ramie and sunn hemp and non-cultivated plants and weeds. In India, the insect is a serious pest of fibre crops, sometimes occurring in epidemic outbreaks. Jute is particularly badly affected, with reductions in yield of up to 30%; nalta jute is more susceptible than white jute.

== Ecology ==
Each female lays up to 1000 eggs on the undersides of leaves in several batches. When these hatch, the larvae at first scrape the under surface of the leaf, but as they grow they feed on the edges of the leaves, giving these a net-like appearance. When sufficiently numerous, they may defoliate the plant. There are a number of natural enemies of these caterpillars, and in the jute crop in India, the braconid wasp Protapanteles obliquae is one of these. The wasp lays its eggs in the first instar caterpillar. By the second or third instar, the wasp larvae are fully grown and thrust their way out through the caterpillar's ventral surface, forming small, woolly, white chrysalises. By this time, the caterpillar is moribund or dead.

== Control ==
The indiscriminate use of synthetic insecticides for this pest has not proved satisfactory, having led to resistance to the active ingredients among the target population, as well as causing damage to the environment. There are a number of natural enemies but these are insufficient to maintain control. Investigations are being made into the use of a viral bio-control agent known as SpobNPV. In a field trial using jute, there was a 69, 79 and 93% reduction in the larval population at 3, 4 and 7 days after spraying.
