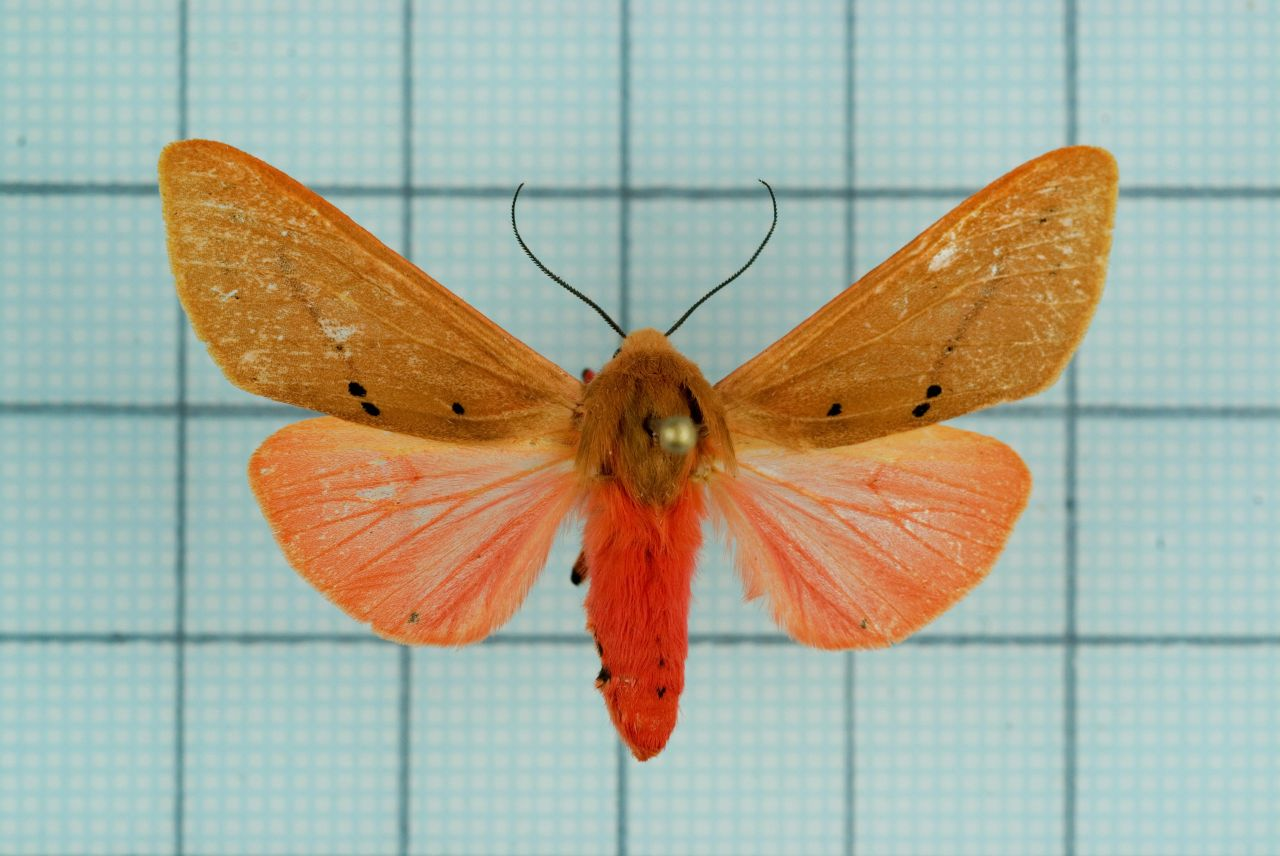

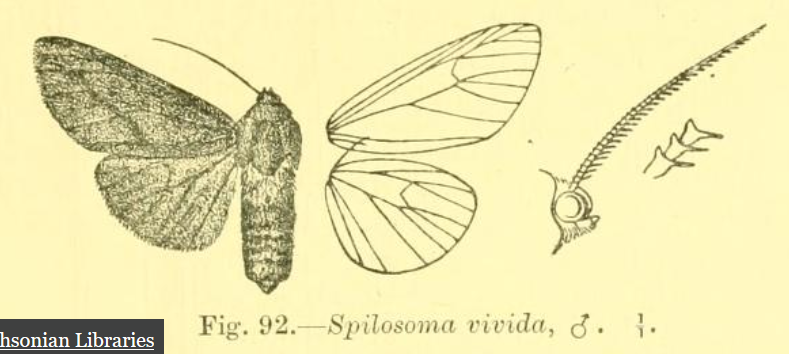

Scientific classification
- Domain: Eukaryota
- Kingdom: Animalia
- Phylum: Arthropoda
- Class: Insecta
- Order: Lepidoptera
- Superfamily: Noctuoidea
- Family: Erebidae
- Subfamily: Arctiinae
- Genus: Spilosoma
- Species: S. wilemani

Binomial name
- Spilosoma wilemani (Rothschild, 1914)

Synonyms
- Diacrisia wilemani Rothschild, 1914; Spilarctia wilemani; Aloa vivida Wileman, 1910; Spilosoma vivida Hampson, 1920

= Spilosoma wilemani =

Species of moth

Spilosoma wilemani is a species of moth of the family Erebidae. It was described by Walter Rothschild in 1914. It is found in Taiwan and Japan's southern Ryukyu Islands.

== Description ==
Antenna of male serrate on upperside, pectinate on lower.

=== Male ===
Head and thorax rufous; palpi crimson at base, black at tips; lower part of frons black; antennae black; a crimson bar behind the eyes; fore coxae and the femora above crimson, the tibiae and tarsi black above; abdomen crimson, the ventral surface rufous, dorsal and lateral series of small black spots except at base and extremity. Forewing rufous; a small antemedial black spot above vein l; an oblique series of black points from below apex to inner margin beyond middle, almost obsolete from below vein 6 to above 2; slight subterminal black points between veins 5 and 3. Hindwing crimson; a minute discoidal black point; cilia pale at tips. Underside of forewing crimson.

=== Female ===
Frons black at sides only; hindwing with black discoidal spot and subterminal spots below vein 2 and on vein 1 nearer termen; underside of forewing with black discoidal spot.

The wingspan for the male is 30 mm and for the female it is 60 mm.
