= Spilosoma alticola =

Scientific classification
- Domain: Eukaryota
- Kingdom: Animalia
- Phylum: Arthropoda
- Class: Insecta
- Order: Lepidoptera
- Superfamily: Noctuoidea
- Family: Erebidae
- Subfamily: Arctiinae
- Genus: Spilosoma
- Species: S. alticola

Binomial name
- Spilosoma alticola Rogenhofer, 1891

Species of moth

Spilosoma alticola is a moth in the family Erebidae. It was described by Alois Friedrich Rogenhofer in 1891. It is found in Tanzania.
