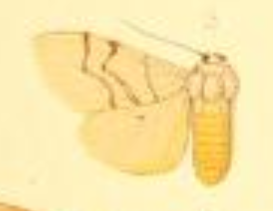
- From the Catalogue of the Lepidoptera Phalaenae in the British Museum

Scientific classification
- Kingdom: Animalia
- Phylum: Arthropoda
- Class: Insecta
- Order: Lepidoptera
- Superfamily: Noctuoidea
- Family: Erebidae
- Subfamily: Arctiinae
- Genus: Spilosoma
- Species: S. curvilinea

Binomial name
- Spilosoma curvilinea Walker, 1855

Synonyms
- Estigmene senegalensis Rothschild, 1933; Diacrisia curvilinea ab. obsoletilinea Strand, 1919

= Spilosoma curvilinea =

Species of moth

Spilosoma curvilinea is a species of moth of the family Erebidae. It was described by Francis Walker in 1855. It is found in Cameroon, Republic of the Congo, Democratic Republic of the Congo, Ghana, Ivory Coast, Kenya, Nigeria, Senegal, Sierra Leone, Sudan, Tanzania, the Gambia and Uganda.

== Description ==
In 1920 George F. Hampson described Diacrisia curvilinea, writing:

Dull yellowish white; palpi, frons, and basal joint of antennae orange, the palpi at sides and branches of antennae black; pectus and legs orange, the tibiae and tarsi striped with black; abdomen orange. Fore wing with black antemedial line slightly excurved below costa; a medial line with spot on it at upper angle of cell, oblique from costa to lower angle of cell, then inwardly oblique and sinuous; a sinuous postmedial line excurved between veins 5 and 3; cilia yellowish; the lines sometimes much reduced and partially obsolete. Hind wing yellowish white, with black discoidal spot.

Ab. 1. Fore wing with the ante- and postmedial lines obsolete. — Gambia, Coll. Druce.

Hab. Lagos (Strahan), 12; Gambia (Moloney); Congo (Curror), 1 m, 1 f type. Exp., m 32, f 38 millim.
