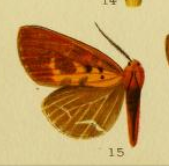

Scientific classification
- Kingdom: Animalia
- Phylum: Arthropoda
- Class: Insecta
- Order: Lepidoptera
- Superfamily: Noctuoidea
- Family: Erebidae
- Subfamily: Arctiinae
- Genus: Spilosoma
- Species: S. ignivagans

Binomial name
- Spilosoma ignivagans Rothschild, 1919

= Spilosoma ignivagans =

Species of moth

Spilosoma ignivagans is a moth in the family Erebidae. It was described by Rothschild in 1919. It is found in China (Yunnan).

== Description ==
Male

Very closely allied to erythrophleps, Hmpsn., but with less red on fore wings and fewer pale markings on hind wings. Antennae black, pectus and legs sooty-slate, frons and vertex rufous-orange; thorax rufous-orange, with a sooty dot on teguloe and sooty streaks on patagia; abdomen above rufous-orange ringed with sooty black, below white. Fore wing slate-brown with orange-scarlet nervures; three ill-defined orange-scarlet patches on basal half of costa; two rufous-orange spots in cell and one beyond; four irregular bands of rufous-orange below median to inner margin, much angled, waved, excised, and partially joined. Hind wings sooty slate-grey, with white veins; a broken irregular post-median band, broader between vein 2 and abdominal margin; some white spots at end of veins. Length of fore wing 26 mm.; expanse 56.5 mm. Hab. Tali, Yunnan.
