= Spilosoma mediocinerea =

Scientific classification
- Kingdom: Animalia
- Phylum: Arthropoda
- Class: Insecta
- Order: Lepidoptera
- Superfamily: Noctuoidea
- Family: Erebidae
- Subfamily: Arctiinae
- Genus: Spilosoma
- Species: S. mediocinerea

Binomial name
- Spilosoma mediocinerea (Toulgoët, 1956)

Synonyms
- Spilarctia mediocinerea Toulgoët, 1956

Species of moth

Spilosoma mediocinerea is a moth in the family Erebidae. It was described by Hervé de Toulgoët in 1956. It is found on Madagascar.
