= Hyarias =

Scientific classification
- Kingdom: Animalia
- Phylum: Arthropoda
- Class: Insecta
- Order: Lepidoptera
- Superfamily: Noctuoidea
- Family: Erebidae
- Subfamily: Arctiinae
- Genus: Hyarias; C. Swinhoe, 1892
- Species: H. metarhoda

Binomial name
- Hyarias metarhoda (Walker, 1856)

Synonyms
- Spilosoma metarhoda Walker, 1856; Diacrisia metarhoda

Genus of moths

Hyarias is a monotypic tiger moth genus in the family Erebidae erected by Charles Swinhoe in 1892. Its only species, Hyarias metarhoda, was described by Francis Walker in 1856. It is strictly endemic to the Philippines.

== Taxonomy ==
This species was previously included in Spilosoma, but those species have quite different male genitalia.
