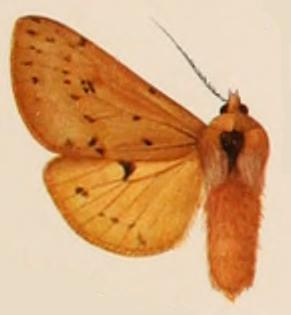

Scientific classification
- Kingdom: Animalia
- Phylum: Arthropoda
- Class: Insecta
- Order: Lepidoptera
- Superfamily: Noctuoidea
- Family: Erebidae
- Subfamily: Arctiinae
- Genus: Spilosoma
- Species: S. fraterna

Binomial name
- Spilosoma fraterna (Rothschild, 1910)

Synonyms
- Diacrisia fraterna Rothschild, 1910; Spilarctia fraterna

= Spilosoma fraterna =

Species of moth

Spilosoma fraterna is a moth of the family Erebidae first described by Walter Rothschild in 1910. It is found on Papua New Guinea.

== Description ==
=== Male ===
The head and thorax are ochreous tinged with fulvous; palpi and sides of frons black; a large black patch on prothorax with streak from it to metathorax; pectus black; femora crimson fringed with ochreous hair, the tibiae and tarsi black; abdomen pale crimson with a blackish dorsal streak on medial segments, the ventral surface ochreous, lateral and sublateral black points on medial segments. Forewing brownish ochreous; minute antemedial black spots on costa, below median nervure, and above vein 1; four black points at lower angle of cell; a postmedial series of black points on each side of the veins, excurved to vein 4, then incurved; a subterminal series of black points on each side of the veins from costa to vein 3, slightly excurved at vein 5. Hindwing pale ochreous yellow; a black discoidal lunule; subterminal black points on each side of vein 5 with traces of a series of points below it bent outwards to termen below vein 1; the underside with the costal area fulvous yellow, a slight postmedial black mark on costa.

This moth's wingspan is 48 mm.
