= Spilosoma clasnaumanni =

Scientific classification
- Kingdom: Animalia
- Phylum: Arthropoda
- Clade: Pancrustacea
- Class: Insecta
- Order: Lepidoptera
- Superfamily: Noctuoidea
- Family: Erebidae
- Subfamily: Arctiinae
- Genus: Spilosoma
- Species: S. clasnaumanni

Binomial name
- Spilosoma clasnaumanni Kühne, 2005

Species of moth

Spilosoma clasnaumanni is a moth in the family Erebidae. It was described by Lars Kühne in 2005. It is found in Kenya.
