= Spilosoma penultimum =

Scientific classification
- Domain: Eukaryota
- Kingdom: Animalia
- Phylum: Arthropoda
- Class: Insecta
- Order: Lepidoptera
- Superfamily: Noctuoidea
- Family: Erebidae
- Subfamily: Arctiinae
- Genus: Spilosoma
- Species: S. penultimum

Binomial name
- Spilosoma penultimum Kiriakoff, 1965

Species of moth

Spilosoma penultimum is a moth in the family Erebidae. It was described by Sergius G. Kiriakoff in 1965. It is found in the Democratic Republic of the Congo, Tanzania and Uganda.
