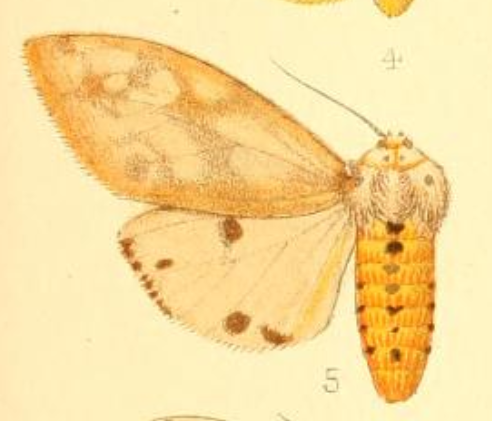

Scientific classification
- Domain: Eukaryota
- Kingdom: Animalia
- Phylum: Arthropoda
- Class: Insecta
- Order: Lepidoptera
- Superfamily: Noctuoidea
- Family: Erebidae
- Subfamily: Arctiinae
- Genus: Spilosoma
- Species: S. rava

Binomial name
- Spilosoma rava (H. Druce, 1898)

Synonyms
- Spilarctia rava H. Druce, 1898

= Spilosoma rava =

Species of moth

Spilosoma rava is a moth in the family Erebidae. It was described by Herbert Druce in 1898. It is found in Cameroon, the Democratic Republic of the Congo, Equatorial Guinea, Gabon, Ghana, Kenya, Liberia, Nigeria, Senegal, the Gambia and Uganda.

The larvae are polyphagous.

== Description ==
=== Female ===
Ochreous white; lower part of frons blackish; antennae black; tegulae, patagia, and shoulders with black points, the tegulae edged with yellow; fore coxae tinged with yellow, the legs black above; abdomen orange above, with dorsal, lateral, and sublateral series of black spots. Forewing with black point at base; the markings of underside showing slightly above and consisting of a medial fuscous band angled at lower angle of cell; a discoidal lunule; a postmedial line excurved between veins 5 and 3, interrupted at middle, met by an oblique series of irregular spots from costa and with spots beyond it towards inner margin; some points on termen towards apex. Hindwing with fuscous discoidal spot; two spots towards tornus; a subterminal point above vein 5, and some points on termen towards apex; some orange hair on inner area.

Its wingspan is about 60 mm.

== Subspecies ==
- Spilosoma rava rava Goodger & Watson, 1995 (Senegal, the Gambia, Ghana)
- Spilosoma rava deleta Debauche, 1938 (Democratic Republic of the Congo)
