= Spilosoma extrema =

Scientific classification
- Domain: Eukaryota
- Kingdom: Animalia
- Phylum: Arthropoda
- Class: Insecta
- Order: Lepidoptera
- Superfamily: Noctuoidea
- Family: Erebidae
- Subfamily: Arctiinae
- Genus: Spilosoma
- Species: S. extrema

Binomial name
- Spilosoma extrema Daniel, 1943

Synonyms
- Spilosoma menthastri extrema Daniel, 1943; Spilosoma lubricipeda extrema

Species of moth

Spilosoma extrema is a moth in the family Erebidae. It was described by Franz Daniel in 1943. It is found in Yunnan, China.

Note: Lepindex lists a Spilosoma extrema Bannerman, 1933 as a synonym of Spilosoma purpurata.
