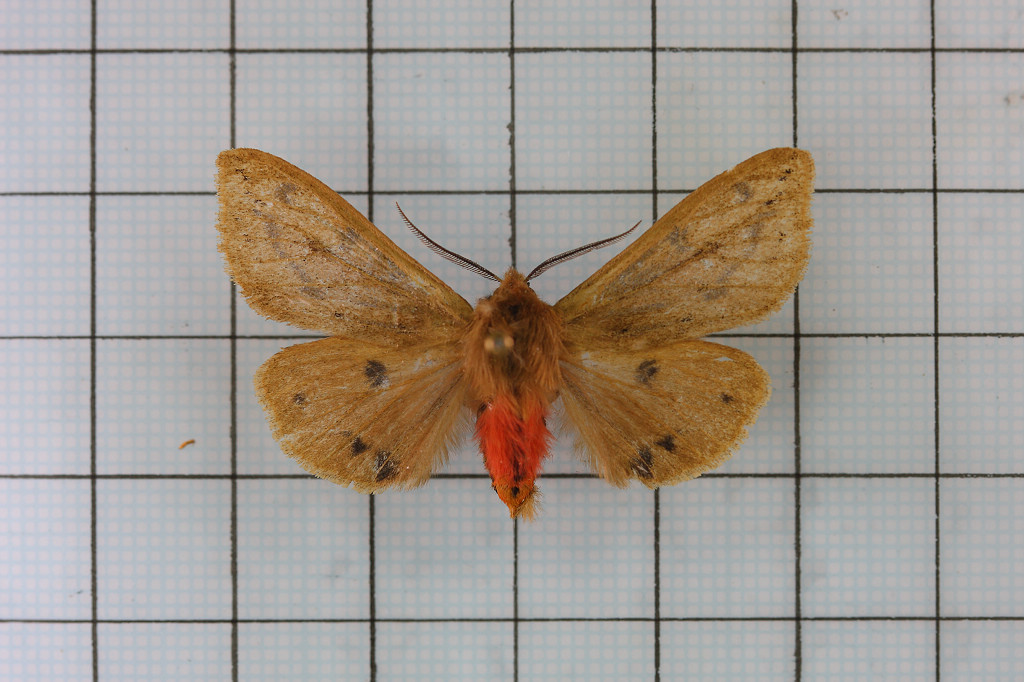

Scientific classification
- Domain: Eukaryota
- Kingdom: Animalia
- Phylum: Arthropoda
- Class: Insecta
- Order: Lepidoptera
- Superfamily: Noctuoidea
- Family: Erebidae
- Subfamily: Arctiinae
- Genus: Spilosoma
- Species: S. fumida

Binomial name
- Spilosoma fumida (Wileman, 1910)

Synonyms
- Diacrisia fumida Wileman, 1910; Spilarctia fumida Kôda, 1988

= Spilosoma fumida =

Species of moth

Spilosoma fumida is a species of moth of the family Erebidae. It was described by Alfred Ernest Wileman in 1910. It is found in Taiwan.

== Description ==
Head and thorax grey brown with a blackish stripe on dorsum of thorax; palpi and lower part of frons blackish; antennas black; pectus at sides and fore femora with some crimson, the tibiae and tarsi blackish; abdomen crimson, the extremity and ventral surface greyish dorsal and lateral series of black spots. Forewing grey brown; an antemedial black point above vein 1; traces of a black point at upper angle of cell and two beyond lower angle; an oblique series of black points from apex to inner margin beyond middle placed in pairs on each side of the veins and obsolescent at middle; subterminal pairs of black points on each side of veins 5, 4, 3. Hindwing grey brown, the inner area slightly tinged with crimson; a large black discoidal spot; small subterminal spots on each side of vein 5. traces of a point below vein 4 and a curved band formed by three spots from vein 3 to termen at vein 1. Underside of forewing suffused with black on basal half except towards costa and inner margin, a large discoidal lunule, a post-medial spot below costa and oblique band from discal fold to vein 1, its upper extremity joined by an oblique series of points from apex; hindwing with the subterminal maculate band more entire.

The wingspan of the male is 50 mm and the female 54 mm.
