= Spilosoma turlini =

Scientific classification
- Kingdom: Animalia
- Phylum: Arthropoda
- Class: Insecta
- Order: Lepidoptera
- Superfamily: Noctuoidea
- Family: Erebidae
- Subfamily: Arctiinae
- Genus: Spilosoma
- Species: S. turlini

Binomial name
- Spilosoma turlini Toulgoët, 1973

Species of moth

Spilosoma turlini is a moth in the family Erebidae. It was described by Hervé de Toulgoët in 1973. It is found on Madagascar.
