= Spilosoma albiventre =

Scientific classification
- Domain: Eukaryota
- Kingdom: Animalia
- Phylum: Arthropoda
- Class: Insecta
- Order: Lepidoptera
- Superfamily: Noctuoidea
- Family: Erebidae
- Subfamily: Arctiinae
- Genus: Spilosoma
- Species: S. albiventre

Binomial name
- Spilosoma albiventre Kiriakoff, 1963

Species of moth

Spilosoma albiventre is a moth in the family Erebidae. It was described by Sergius G. Kiriakoff in 1963. It is found in the Democratic Republic of the Congo and Tanzania.
