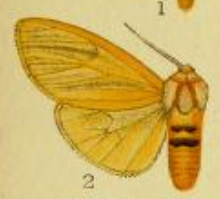

Scientific classification
- Domain: Eukaryota
- Kingdom: Animalia
- Phylum: Arthropoda
- Class: Insecta
- Order: Lepidoptera
- Superfamily: Noctuoidea
- Family: Erebidae
- Subfamily: Arctiinae
- Genus: Spilosoma
- Species: S. occidens

Binomial name
- Spilosoma occidens (Rothschild, 1910)

Synonyms
- Diacrisia occidens Rothschild, 1910

= Spilosoma occidens =

Species of moth

Spilosoma occidens is a moth in the family Erebidae. It was described by Walter Rothschild in 1910. It is found in the Democratic Republic of the Congo, Ghana, Nigeria, Senegal and Sierra Leone.

Larva have been reported feeding on Malvaceae.

== Description ==
=== Male ===
Head and thorax ochreous, the vertex of head, tegulae, and patagia with greenish-grey patches, the back of head and tips of tegulae orange; palpi above blackish; antennae brown; legs blackish; abdomen orange with black segmental lines and dorsal band on 2nd segment, the sides fuscous, the ventral surface ochreous. Forewing uniform ochreous. Hindwing pale ochreous yellow, the inner area rather yellower.

=== Female ===
Abdomen with broad black dorsal hands; wings more orange yellow. Forewing with faint greyish fasciae in the interspaces, often more developed in the female.

Wingspan for the male 32–44 mm and for the female 44–56 mm. This may be an aberration of Binna penicillata.

== Subspecies ==
- Spilosoma occidens occidens Goodger & Watson, 1995
- Spilosoma occidens nyangweensis (Strand, 1922)
