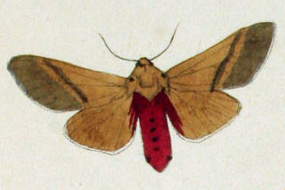

Scientific classification
- Kingdom: Animalia
- Phylum: Arthropoda
- Class: Insecta
- Order: Lepidoptera
- Superfamily: Noctuoidea
- Family: Erebidae
- Subfamily: Arctiinae
- Genus: Spilosoma
- Species: S. melanopsis

Binomial name
- Spilosoma melanopsis (Walker, [1865])

Synonyms
- Arctia melanopsis Walker, [1865]; Rhodareas melanopsis; Areas melanopsis; Pericallia melanopsis; Aloa callisoma Felder, 1874

= Spilosoma melanopsis =

Species of moth

Spilosoma melanopsis is a moth in the family Erebidae. It was described by Francis Walker in 1865. It is found in Sri Lanka.

== Description ==
Antennae of male has short branches. Head and thorax ochreous, frons black, palpi crimson and black above. Paired black spots can be seen on shoulders and tegulae. Abdomen crimson in both sexes above and whitish below with a dorsal and two paired lateral series of black spots. Thorax ventrally and femur are crimson colored. Forewings are ochreous. A fuscous oblique band runs from costa to beyond the middle of the center of inner margin. Hindwing ochreous. The inner area suffused with crimson color. Cilia of both wings are whitish.
