= Spilosoma fujianensis =

Scientific classification
- Kingdom: Animalia
- Phylum: Arthropoda
- Clade: Pancrustacea
- Class: Insecta
- Order: Lepidoptera
- Superfamily: Noctuoidea
- Family: Erebidae
- Subfamily: Arctiinae
- Genus: Spilosoma
- Species: S. fujianensis

Binomial name
- Spilosoma fujianensis C.-L. Fang, 1981

Species of moth

Spilosoma fujianensis is a moth in the family Erebidae. It was described by Cheng-Lai Fang in 1981. It is found in Fujian, China.
