= Spilosoma fusifrons =

Scientific classification
- Kingdom: Animalia
- Phylum: Arthropoda
- Clade: Pancrustacea
- Class: Insecta
- Order: Lepidoptera
- Superfamily: Noctuoidea
- Family: Erebidae
- Subfamily: Arctiinae
- Genus: Spilosoma
- Species: S. fusifrons

Binomial name
- Spilosoma fusifrons Walker, [1865]

Species of moth

Spilosoma fusifrons is a moth in the family Erebidae. It was described by Francis Walker in 1865. It is found in southern India.

== Description ==
=== Female ===
White. Head in front and palpi brown. Thorax with six black dots. Abdomen pale luteous, with three rows of black spots. Forewings with many irregular black spots, and with a black excavated middle band. Hindwings with a black discal spot, and with a macular submarginal black band; underside with a black interior patch extending from the costa to the disk. Length of the body 6 lines; of the wings 18 lines.
