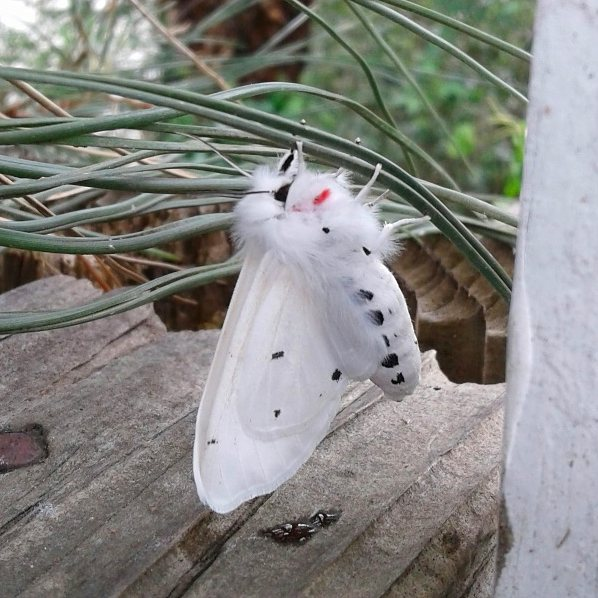

Scientific classification
- Kingdom: Animalia
- Phylum: Arthropoda
- Clade: Pancrustacea
- Class: Insecta
- Order: Lepidoptera
- Superfamily: Noctuoidea
- Family: Erebidae
- Subfamily: Arctiinae
- Genus: Spilosoma
- Species: S. vestalis

Binomial name
- Spilosoma vestalis Packard, 1864

Synonyms
- Spilosoma vestalis ab. amelaina Dyar, 1893

= Spilosoma vestalis =

Vestal tiger-moth

Species of moth

Spilosoma vestalis, the Vestal tiger-moth, is a moth in the family Erebidae. It was described by Alpheus Spring Packard in 1864. It is found along the coast of western North America, from California north to the Kitsap Peninsula in Washington and western Idaho.

The length of the forewings is 19–26 mm. Adults are on wing from May to June.

The larvae feed on various plants, including Alnus rubra and Quercus garryana.

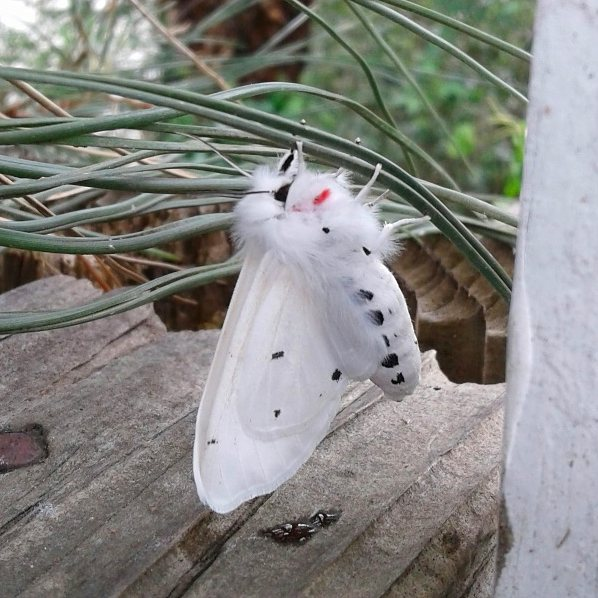
In Cotati, California

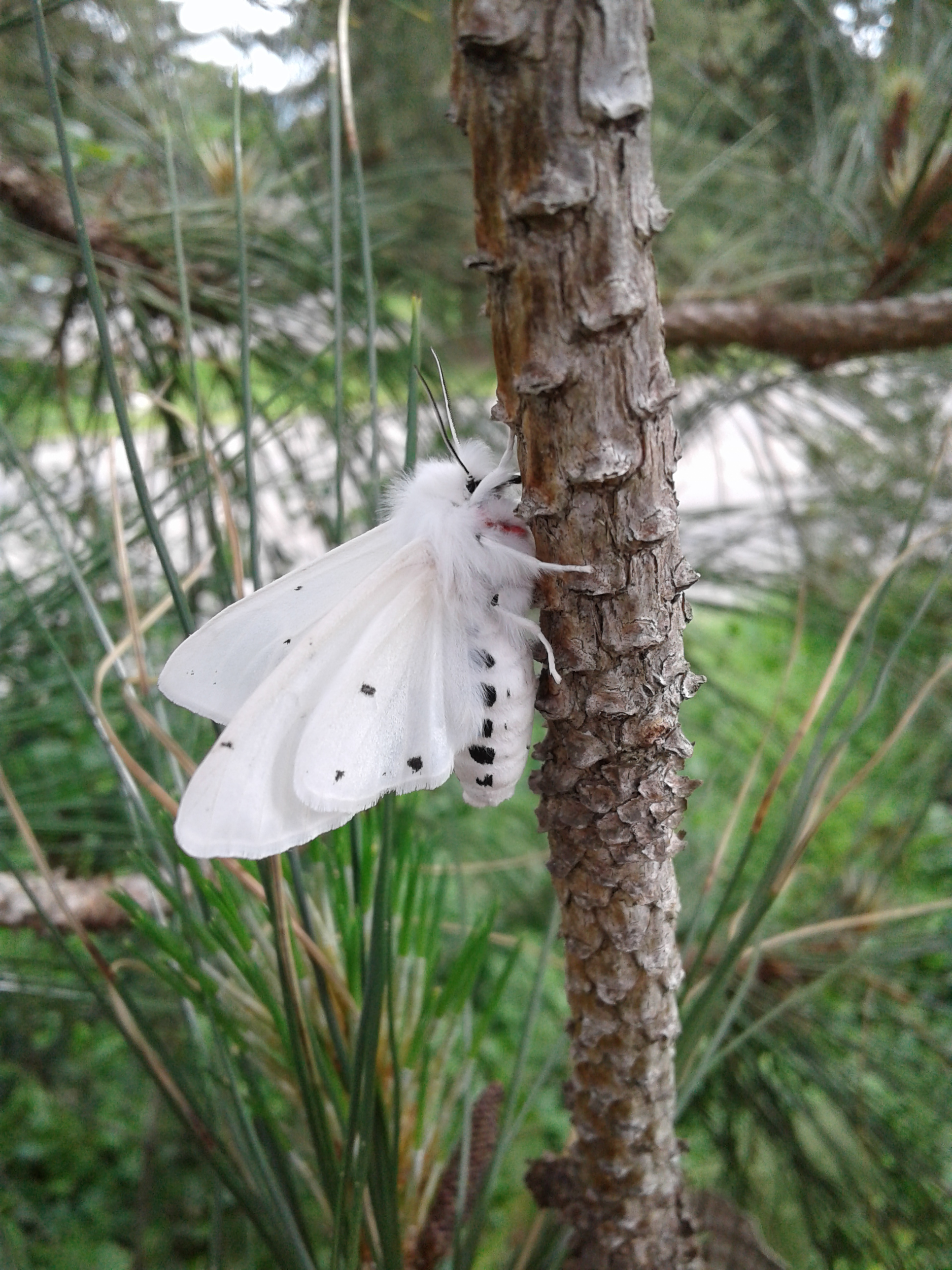
Adult moth

S. vestalis larva
