= Spilosoma bipartita =

Scientific classification
- Domain: Eukaryota
- Kingdom: Animalia
- Phylum: Arthropoda
- Class: Insecta
- Order: Lepidoptera
- Superfamily: Noctuoidea
- Family: Erebidae
- Subfamily: Arctiinae
- Genus: Spilosoma
- Species: S. bipartita

Binomial name
- Spilosoma bipartita Rothschild, 1933

Synonyms
- Spilosoma unimaculata Bartel, 1903

Species of moth

Spilosoma bipartita is a moth in the family Erebidae. It was described by Walter Rothschild in 1933. It is found in Angola, Congo, Kenya, Malawi, South Africa, Tanzania and Zimbabwe.
