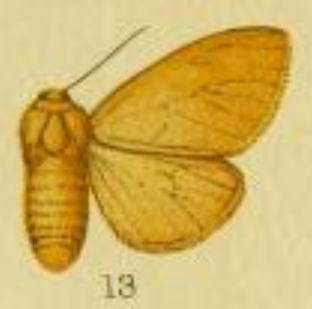

Scientific classification
- Kingdom: Animalia
- Phylum: Arthropoda
- Class: Insecta
- Order: Lepidoptera
- Superfamily: Noctuoidea
- Family: Erebidae
- Subfamily: Arctiinae
- Genus: Spilosoma
- Species: S. holoxantha

Binomial name
- Spilosoma holoxantha (Hampson, 1907)

Synonyms
- Diacrisia holoxantha Hampson, 1907

= Spilosoma holoxantha =

Species of moth

Spilosoma holoxantha is a moth in the family Erebidae. It was described by George Hampson in 1907. It is found in Nigeria and Uganda.

== Description ==
In 1920 Hampson described a female as:

Head and thorax brownish orange; palpi black at tips; fore and mid-tibiae black, hind tibiae black at base and extremity, the tarsi black; abdomen bright orange with dorsal, lateral, and sub-lateral series of black points. Fore wing uniform brownish orange. Hind wing orange-yellow. Underside of both wings with blackish discoidal points and terminal points above and below vein 5. Hab. S. Nigeria, Old Calabar (Sampson), 1 F type. Exp. 44 millim.
