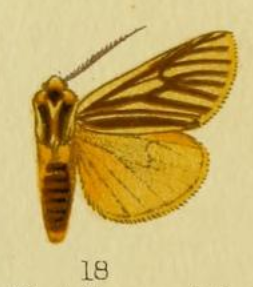

Scientific classification
- Kingdom: Animalia
- Phylum: Arthropoda
- Clade: Pancrustacea
- Class: Insecta
- Order: Lepidoptera
- Superfamily: Noctuoidea
- Family: Erebidae
- Subfamily: Arctiinae
- Genus: Spilosoma
- Species: S. euryphlebia

Binomial name
- Spilosoma euryphlebia (Hampson, 1903)

Synonyms
- Diacrisia euryphlebia Hampson, 1903

= Spilosoma euryphlebia =

Species of moth

Spilosoma euryphlebia is a moth in the family Erebidae. It was described by George Hampson in 1903. It is found in South Africa.

== Description ==
=== Male ===
Head and thorax yellowish white; palpi, a patch on frons, tegulae, patagia, and dorsal stripe on thorax black; pectus and stripes on legs black; mid and hind femora orange above; abdomen orange with dorsal black bands, lateral stripes and ventral series of spots. Forewing yellowish white; the veins rather broadly striped with black especially the medial part of vein 1; narrow stripes in cell and submedian fold; cilia yellow. Hindwing orange yellow.

Wingspan 38 mm.
