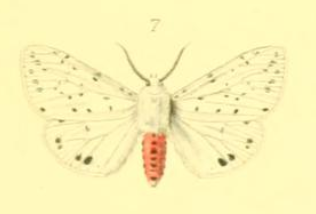

Scientific classification
- Domain: Eukaryota
- Kingdom: Animalia
- Phylum: Arthropoda
- Class: Insecta
- Order: Lepidoptera
- Superfamily: Noctuoidea
- Family: Erebidae
- Subfamily: Arctiinae
- Genus: Spilosoma
- Species: S. punctaria

Binomial name
- Spilosoma punctaria (Stoll, [1782])

Synonyms
- Phalaena Bombyx punctaria Stoll, 1782; Spilosoma punctarium; Arctia punctigera Motschulsky, [1861]; Spilosoma roseiventer Snellen van Vollenhoven, 1863; Spilosoma punctaria miserata Bryk, 1942; Spilosoma dornesii Oberthür, 1879; Spilosoma doerriesi Oberthür, [1881]; Diacrisia sangaicum Hampson, 1894

= Spilosoma punctaria =

Species of moth

Spilosoma punctaria is a moth in the family Erebidae. It was described by Caspar Stoll in 1782. It is found in the Russian Far East (Middle Amur, Primorye, southern Kuril Islands), China (Sichuan, Hubei, Guizhou, Shanghai, Zhejiang, Heilongjiang, Jiangsu, Fujian, Yunnan, Dunbei, Jilin, Liaonin, Beijing, Shaanxi, Anhui, Jiangxi, Hunan, Tibet), Korea, Taiwan and Japan.
