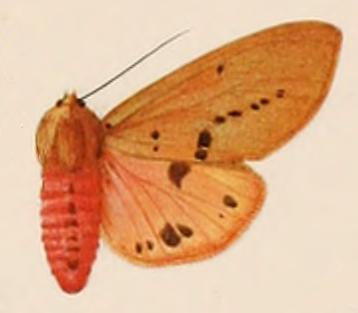

Scientific classification
- Domain: Eukaryota
- Kingdom: Animalia
- Phylum: Arthropoda
- Class: Insecta
- Order: Lepidoptera
- Superfamily: Noctuoidea
- Family: Erebidae
- Subfamily: Arctiinae
- Genus: Spilosoma
- Species: S. cajetani

Binomial name
- Spilosoma cajetani Rothschild, 1910

Synonyms
- Spilarctia cajetani

= Spilosoma cajetani =

Moth of the family Erebidae

Spilosoma cajetani is a moth of the family Erebidae. It was described by Walter Rothschild in 1910. It is found on Seram Island.

== Description ==
=== Female ===
Head and thorax pale brownish ochreous; palpi fringed with crimson at base and black at tips; sides of frons black; (antennae wanting); pectus tinged with crimson; fore coxae at sides and femora above crimson, the tibiae and tarsi black; abdomen crimson, the ventral surface reddish ochreous, dorsal and lateral series of black spots and sublateral black points on medial segments. Forewing brownish ochreous faintly tinged with crimson except on basal, costal, and inner areas; a black point at base of cell; a minute antemedial black streak on costa and small spot above vein 1 and on one side another below it, a minute black spot in upper angle of cell; an incurved postmedial series of spots on each side of veins 4 to 1, minute above and larger towards inner margin. Hindwing pale crimson; two slight blackish streaks at base of inner area; a large black discoidal spot; a sub-terminal spot at discal fold and spots above, and below veins 2 and 1. Underside of forewing suffused with crimson.

Wingspan 58 mm.
