= Spilosoma ningyuenfui =

Scientific classification
- Kingdom: Animalia
- Phylum: Arthropoda
- Class: Insecta
- Order: Lepidoptera
- Superfamily: Noctuoidea
- Family: Erebidae
- Subfamily: Arctiinae
- Genus: Spilosoma
- Species: S. ningyuenfui

Binomial name
- Spilosoma ningyuenfui Daniel, 1943

Species of moth

Spilosoma ningyuenfui is a moth in the family Erebidae. It was described by Franz Daniel in 1943. It is found in China (Yunnan, Sichuan, Tibet).

== Subspecies ==
- Spilosoma ningyuenfui ningyuenfui (China: Yunnan)
- Spilosoma ningyuenfui flava Daniel, 1943 (China: Sichuan, Tibet)
