= Spilosoma rostagnoi =

Scientific classification
- Domain: Eukaryota
- Kingdom: Animalia
- Phylum: Arthropoda
- Class: Insecta
- Order: Lepidoptera
- Superfamily: Noctuoidea
- Family: Erebidae
- Subfamily: Arctiinae
- Genus: Spilosoma
- Species: S. rostagnoi

Binomial name
- Spilosoma rostagnoi Oberthür, 1911

Synonyms
- Spilarctia rostagnoi

Species of moth

Spilosoma rostagnoi is a moth in the family Erebidae. It was described by Charles Oberthür in 1911. It is found in Sichuan, China.

== Description ==
=== Male ===
Head and thorax white, the patagia and metathorax with black spots; antennas black; abdomen scarlet with dorsal series of black bars and lateral series of spots, the ventral surface white. Forewing white; the base of costa with black streak to the slightly curved antemedial series of small black spots; a medial series of partly conjoined black spots, angled outwards below costa, then oblique; a short postmedial black streak on costa, a series of five spots between veins 7 and 3, the two upper spots elongate and the spot below vein 7 conjoined to an oblique maculate fascia from apex, and small spots above and below vein 1; four subterminal spots between veins 6 and 2, the spot below vein 6 nearer the termen and an elongate spot below vein 2; a series of small black spots on the cilia between apex and vein 2. Hindwing white; a black discoidal spot and live small subterminal spots between veins 6 and 1; cilia black at tips at middle.

=== Female ===
Thorax with dorsal black streak; forewing with both sub-basal and antemedial series of black spots, the medial, postmedial, and subterminal spots much larger and the series more complete, the medial series angled outwards at end of cell to join the post-medial series; hindwing with subterminal maculate black hand, interrupted below costa and ending above tornus.
