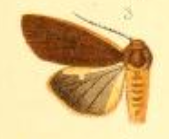

Scientific classification
- Domain: Eukaryota
- Kingdom: Animalia
- Phylum: Arthropoda
- Class: Insecta
- Order: Lepidoptera
- Superfamily: Noctuoidea
- Family: Erebidae
- Subfamily: Arctiinae
- Genus: Spilosoma
- Species: S. melanimon

Binomial name
- Spilosoma melanimon Mabille, 1880

Synonyms
- Spilosoma robleti Mabille, 1893; Pericallia melanimon Hampson, 1901

= Spilosoma melanimon =

Species of moth

Spilosoma melanimon is a moth in the family Erebidae. It was described by Paul Mabille in 1880. It is found in Madagascar.

== Description ==
=== Female ===
Head and thorax deep red brown; basal joint of antennæ orange; femora orange above; abdomen orange, with short dorsal black bands, the ventral surface red brown. Forewing deep red brown, with the costal edge orange. Hindwing fuscous black; the costal area orange yellow to near apex, emitting a small discoidal lunule; the inner margin and cilia yellow.

Wingspan 38 mm.
