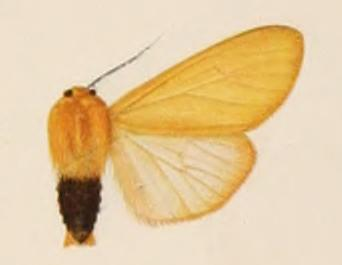

Scientific classification
- Domain: Eukaryota
- Kingdom: Animalia
- Phylum: Arthropoda
- Class: Insecta
- Order: Lepidoptera
- Superfamily: Noctuoidea
- Family: Erebidae
- Subfamily: Arctiinae
- Genus: Spilosoma
- Species: S. baxteri

Binomial name
- Spilosoma baxteri (Rothschild, 1910)

Synonyms
- Amsacta baxteri Rothschild, 1910

= Spilosoma baxteri =

Species of moth

Spilosoma baxteri is a moth of the family Erebidae. It was described by Walter Rothschild in 1910. It is found in Kenya, Malawi and Tanzania.

== Description ==
(Male) Head and thorax yellow, the head and tegulæ tinged with orange; palpi black above; antennas black; legs suffused with fuscous; abdomen black, the base, sides of terminal segments, and anal tuft yellow. Forewing yellow, the costa towards apex and apical half of termen brownish. Hindwing pale yellow.

Hab. "Gehii. E. A.frica," Mpapua (Baxter), type (male) in Coll. Rothschild. Exp. 46 millim.
