= Spilosoma castelli =

Scientific classification
- Domain: Eukaryota
- Kingdom: Animalia
- Phylum: Arthropoda
- Class: Insecta
- Order: Lepidoptera
- Superfamily: Noctuoidea
- Family: Erebidae
- Subfamily: Arctiinae
- Genus: Spilosoma
- Species: S. castelli

Binomial name
- Spilosoma castelli Rothschild, 1933

Species of moth

Spilosoma castelli is a moth in the family Erebidae. It was described by Walter Rothschild in 1933. It is found in Senegal and Nigeria.

== Subspecies ==
- Spilosoma castelli castelli (Senegal)
- Spilosoma castelli grandis Rothschild, 1933 (Nigeria)
