= Spilosoma wahri =

Scientific classification
- Kingdom: Animalia
- Phylum: Arthropoda
- Class: Insecta
- Order: Lepidoptera
- Superfamily: Noctuoidea
- Family: Erebidae
- Subfamily: Arctiinae
- Genus: Spilosoma
- Species: S. wahri

Binomial name
- Spilosoma wahri Rothschild, 1933

Species of moth

Spilosoma wahri is a moth in the family Erebidae. It was described by Walter Rothschild in 1933. It is found on Timor.
