= Spilosoma likiangensis =

Scientific classification
- Domain: Eukaryota
- Kingdom: Animalia
- Phylum: Arthropoda
- Class: Insecta
- Order: Lepidoptera
- Superfamily: Noctuoidea
- Family: Erebidae
- Subfamily: Arctiinae
- Genus: Spilosoma
- Species: S. likiangensis

Binomial name
- Spilosoma likiangensis Daniel, 1943

Species of moth

Spilosoma likiangensis is a moth in the family Erebidae. It was described by Franz Daniel in 1943. It is found in Yunnan and Guangxi in China.
