= Spilosoma yemenensis =

Scientific classification
- Kingdom: Animalia
- Phylum: Arthropoda
- Class: Insecta
- Order: Lepidoptera
- Superfamily: Noctuoidea
- Family: Erebidae
- Subfamily: Arctiinae
- Genus: Spilosoma
- Species: S. yemenensis

Binomial name
- Spilosoma yemenensis (Hampson, 1916)

Synonyms
- Diacrisia yemenensis Hampson, 1916

Species of moth

Spilosoma yemenensis is a moth in the family Erebidae. It was described by George Hampson in 1916. It is found in Yemen.
