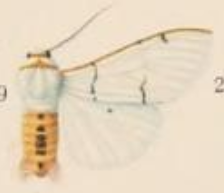
- From Novitates Zoologicae (1910)

Scientific classification
- Domain: Eukaryota
- Kingdom: Animalia
- Phylum: Arthropoda
- Class: Insecta
- Order: Lepidoptera
- Superfamily: Noctuoidea
- Family: Erebidae
- Subfamily: Arctiinae
- Genus: Spilosoma
- Species: S. buryi

Binomial name
- Spilosoma buryi (Rothschild, 1910)

Synonyms
- Diacrisia buryi Rothschild, 1910; Maenas buryi Hampson, 1920

= Spilosoma buryi =

Species of moth

Spilosoma buryi is a moth in the family Erebidae. It was described by Walter Rothschild in 1910. It is found in Ghana and Nigeria.

== Description ==
In 1920 George F. Hampson wrote:

Diacrisia buryi, Roths. Nov. Zool. xvii. p. 126, pi. 11, f. 19 (1910).

(Male) Head yellow, white behind; palpi black fringed with yellow below; antennae black; thorax white, the tegulae edged with yellow; pectus in front and base of legs yellow, the fore coxae and femora with black patches, the fore and mid-tibiae and tarsi black above, the hind tibiae and tarsi banded with black; abdomen yellow with the 1st two segments, the anal tuft and ventral surface white, dorsal and lateral series of black spots. Forewing white, the costal edge yellow; a black antemedial line interrupted at the veins, excurved to median nervure, then slightly incurved; a fine black postmedial line, interrupted from above vein 6 to above vein 2 and slightly incurved on inner area. Hindwing semihyaline white with black discoidal point.

Hab. Gold Coast, Gambaga (Bury), type male in Coll. Rothschild; N. Nigeria, Zungeru (Macfie), 1 male, Minna (Macfie), 1 male.

Exp. 36 millim.
