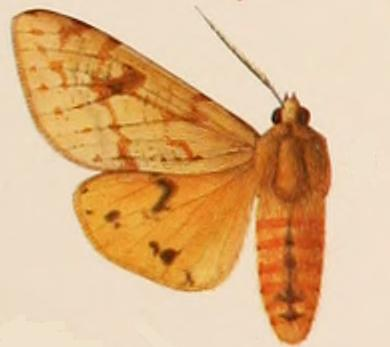

Scientific classification
- Domain: Eukaryota
- Kingdom: Animalia
- Phylum: Arthropoda
- Class: Insecta
- Order: Lepidoptera
- Superfamily: Noctuoidea
- Family: Erebidae
- Subfamily: Arctiinae
- Genus: Spilosoma
- Species: S. alberti

Binomial name
- Spilosoma alberti (Rothschild, 1914)

Synonyms
- Diacrisia alberti Rothschild, 1914; Spilarctia alberti; Diacrisia meeki Rothschild, 1910 (preocc. Druce, 1899); Spilosoma meeci Hampson, 1920

= Spilosoma alberti =

Species of moth

Spilosoma alberti is a moth of the family Erebidae. It was described by Walter Rothschild in 1914. It is found on Papua New Guinea, where it is restricted to mountainous areas at high altitudes ranging from 1,200 to 2,150 meters.

== Description ==
Male

Pectus sooty black with orange-red margins; legs sooty black brown; palpi and sides of frons black, rest of head and thorax pale bronzy gall-stone yellow; antennae brown; abdomen salmon colour with dorsal central dark fuscous line. Forewing pale bronzy buff with four irregular transverse bands of apricot orange, the ante- and postmedian ones joined by a longitudinal band of same colour along the median nervure, a big patch of apricot orange at apex of cell. Hindwing bronzy buff washed with pale crimson, a median and postmedian band of large black blotches, and from apex to vein 4 a submarginal row of five black spots.

Female

Similar but larger, and hindwing salmon crimson.

Length of forewing: male 28 mm; female 33 mm.
