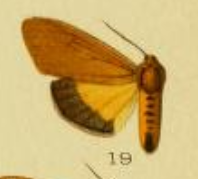

Scientific classification
- Domain: Eukaryota
- Kingdom: Animalia
- Phylum: Arthropoda
- Class: Insecta
- Order: Lepidoptera
- Superfamily: Noctuoidea
- Family: Erebidae
- Subfamily: Arctiinae
- Genus: Spilosoma
- Species: S. nigrocastanea

Binomial name
- Spilosoma nigrocastanea (Rothschild, 1917)

Synonyms
- Diacrisia nigrocastanea Rothschild, 1917; Estigmene nigrocastanea Hampson, 1920

= Spilosoma nigrocastanea =

Species of moth

Spilosoma nigrocastanea is a moth in the family Erebidae. It was described by Walter Rothschild in 1917. It is found in Malawi.

== Description ==
=== Female ===
Head and thorax fulvous yellow, the antennae black, the lower part of frons and palpi dark brown; abdomen orange with dorsal black spots on 2nd to 6th segments and quadrate patch on two terminal segments; pectus, legs, and ventral surface of abdomen black brown, the fore femora orange above. Forewing uniform fulvous yellow. Hindwing orange yellow with a broad black terminal hand except at tornus, its inner edge slightly irregular. Underside of forewing orange yellow with broad black-brown band on terminal area, arising below the costa, narrowing somewhat to inner margin and leaving the termen, very narrowly, and the cilia orange.

Wingspan 38 mm.
