= Spilarctia inexpectata =

Scientific classification
- Domain: Eukaryota
- Kingdom: Animalia
- Phylum: Arthropoda
- Class: Insecta
- Order: Lepidoptera
- Superfamily: Noctuoidea
- Family: Erebidae
- Subfamily: Arctiinae
- Genus: Spilarctia
- Species: S. inexpectata

Binomial name
- Spilarctia inexpectata (Rothschild, 1933)

Synonyms
- Spilosoma inexpectata Rothschild, 1933; Nicetosoma inexpectata (Rothschild, 1933)

Species of moth

Spilarctia inexpectata is a moth in the family Erebidae. It was described by Walter Rothschild in 1933. It is found in New Ireland in Papua New Guinea.

It is considered by The Global Lepidoptera Names Index to be in the genus Spilosoma.
