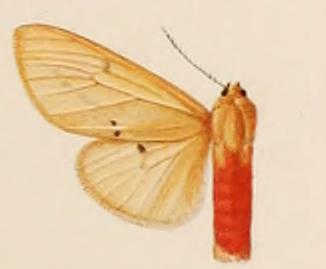

Scientific classification
- Kingdom: Animalia
- Phylum: Arthropoda
- Clade: Pancrustacea
- Class: Insecta
- Order: Lepidoptera
- Superfamily: Noctuoidea
- Family: Erebidae
- Subfamily: Arctiinae
- Genus: Spilosoma
- Species: S. semperi

Binomial name
- Spilosoma semperi (Rothschild, 1910)

Synonyms
- Diacrisia semperi Rothschild, 1910; Spilarctia semperi

= Spilosoma semperi =

Species of moth

Spilosoma semperi is a moth of the family Erebidae. It was described by Walter Rothschild in 1910. It is found on Sumatra and Peninsular Malaysia.

== Description ==
=== Male ===
Head and thorax pale fulvous yellow; palpi crimson, black at tips; sides of frons and antennae black; pectus in front blackish, some blackish and crimson below shoulders; fore coxae crimson; (legs wanting); abdomen crimson, the ventral surface pale ochreous, lateral series of slight blackish points. Forewing pale ochreous yellow; small postmedial black spots above and below vein 1. Hindwing yellowish white, the inner area rather yellower; a small black discoidal spot. Underside of forewing with black discoidal lunule and oblique blackish postmedial striae from vein 5 to below vein 3; hindwing with the costal area yellower.

The wingspan is 44 mm.
