= Spilosoma =

- Spilosoma lubricipeda

Scientific classification
- Kingdom: Animalia
- Phylum: Arthropoda
- Clade: Pancrustacea
- Class: Insecta
- Order: Lepidoptera
- Superfamily: Noctuoidea
- Family: Erebidae
- Subfamily: Arctiinae
- Subtribe: Spilosomina
- Genus: Spilosoma; Curtis, 1825

Synonyms
- Rhagonis Walker, 1862; Elpis Dyar, 1893; Spilarctia Butler, 1875 (disputed)

Genus of moths

Spilosoma is a genus of moths in the family Erebidae originally described by John Curtis in 1825. A very heterogeneous group, it is in need of review by the scientific community, as certain species probably need reclassification into their own genera.

== Description ==
Palpi short, porrect (extending forward) and fringed with hair. Antennae bipectinate (comb like on both sides) in male and serrate in female. Mid tibia with a terminal pair of minute spurs and hind tibia with two spur pairs. Forewings are rather long and narrow. Veins 3 to 5 from angle of cell. Vein 6 from upper angle and veins 7 to 10 are stalked. Hindwings with veins 3 to 5 from angle of cell. Veins 6 and 7 from upper angle. Vein 8 from middle of cell. Female with an abdominal tuft developed in most cases.

== Species more or less allied to the type species (= Eurasian Spilosoma lubricipeda (Linnaeus, 1758) ==
- Spilosoma congrua Walker, 1855 – agreeable tiger moth, white-bodied estigmene
- Spilosoma daitoensis Matsumura, 1930
- Spilosoma dubia (Walker, 1855) – dubious tiger moth
- Spilosoma erythrozona (Kollar, [1844])
- Spilosoma extrema Daniel, 1943
- Spilosoma fujianensis Fang, 1981
- Spilosoma inexpectata Rothschild, 1933
- Spilosoma latipennis Stretch, 1872 – pink-legged tiger moth, red-legged diacrisia
- Spilosoma likiangensis Daniel, 1943
- Spilosoma lubricipeda (Linnaeus, 1758) – white ermine
- Spilosoma lutea (Hufnagel, 1766) – buff ermine
- Spilosoma ningyuenfui Daniel, 1943
- Spilosoma pelopea (Druce, 1897)
- Spilosoma punctaria (Stoll, [1782])
- Spilosoma reticulata Rothschild, 1933
- Spilosoma rostagnoi Oberthür, 1911
- Spilosoma rubidus (Leech, 1890)
- Spilosoma semialbescens Talbot, 1929
- Spilosoma urticae (Esper, 1789) – water ermine
- Spilosoma vestalis Packard, 1864 – vestal tiger-moth
- Spilosoma virginica Fabricius, 1798 – Virginia tiger moth
- Spilosoma yemenensis (Hampson, 1916)

=== Erythrophleps species group ===
- Spilosoma ignivagans Rothschild, 1919
- Spilosoma erythrophleps Hampson, 1894

=== Subgenus Rhagonis Walker, 1862 or a separate genus ===
- Spilosoma danbyi (Neumögen & Dyar, 1893) – Danby's tiger moth
- Spilosoma pteridis H. Edwards, 1875 – brown tiger moth
- Spilosoma vagans (Boisduval, 1852) – wandering tiger moth

=== Subgenus Rhodareas Kirby, 1892 ===
- Spilosoma melanopsis (Walker, [1865] 1864)

=== Spilosoma sensu lato species not congeneric to the type species ===
- Spilosoma albiventre Kiriakoff, 1963
- Spilosoma atrivenata Rothschild, 1933
- Spilosoma batesi (Rothschild, 1910)
- Spilosoma baxteri (Rothschild, 1910)
- Spilosoma bipartita Rothschild, 1933
- Spilosoma brunneomixta Toulgoët, 1971
- Spilosoma buryi (Rothschild, 1910)
- Spilosoma castelli Rothschild, 1933
- Spilosoma crossi (Rothschild, 1910)
- Spilosoma curvilinea Walker, 1855
- Spilosoma dufranei Kiriakoff, 1965
- Spilosoma feifensis Wiltshire, 1986
- Spilosoma flavidior Gaede, 1923
- Spilosoma gynephaea (Hampson, 1901)
- Spilosoma hercules (Toulgoët, 1956)
- Spilosoma heterogenea Bartel, 1903
- Spilosoma holoxantha (Hampson, 1907)
- Spilosoma immaculata Bartel, 1903
- Spilosoma jordani Debauche, 1938
- Spilosoma jussiaeae (Poey, 1832)
- Spilosoma karschi Bartel, 1903
- Spilosoma latiradiata (Hampson, 1901)
- Spilosoma maniemae Kiriakoff, 1965
- Spilosoma mediocinerea (Toulgoët, 1956)
- Spilosoma mediopunctata (Pagenstecher, 1903)
- Spilosoma melanimon Mabille, 1880
- Spilosoma nigrocastanea (Rothschild, 1917)
- Spilosoma nigrocincta (Kenrick, 1914)
- Spilosoma nyasana Rothschild, 1933
- Spilosoma occidens (Rothschild, 1910)
- Spilosoma pales (Druce, 1910)
- Spilosoma pauliani (Toulgoët, 1956)
- Spilosoma pellucida (Rothschild, 1910)
- Spilosoma penultimum Kiriakoff, 1965
- Spilosoma pseudambrensis (Toulgoët, 1961)
- Spilosoma quadrimacula Toulgoët, 1977
- Spilosoma rava (Druce, 1898)
- Spilosoma tenuivena Kiriakoff, 1965
- Spilosoma togoensis Bartel, 1903
- Spilosoma turlini Toulgoët, 1973

=== Species of unclear status ===
- Spilosoma abbottii (Holland, 1896) [but contra syononym, see Afromoths]
- Spilosoma alberti (Rothschild, 1914)
- Spilosoma alticola Rogenhofer, 1891
- Spilosoma cajetani Rothschild, 1910
- Spilosoma clasnaumanni Kühne, 2005
- Spilosoma clava (Wileman, 1910)
- Spilosoma eldorado (Rothschild, 1910)
- Spilosoma euryphlebia (Hampson, 1903)
- Spilosoma fraterna (Rothschild, 1910)
- Spilosoma fumida (Wileman, 1910)
- Spilosoma fuscipennis Hampson, 1894
- Spilosoma fusifrons Walker, [1865]
- Spilosoma metaleuca (Hampson, 1905)
- Spilosoma obliqua (Walker, 1855)
- Spilosoma roseata (Rothschild, 1910)
- Spilosoma sagittifera Moore, 1888
- Spilosoma semperi (Rothschild, 1910)
- Spilosoma submargininigra Černý, 2014
- Spilosoma virgulae Černý, 2011
- Spilosoma wahri Rothschild, 1933
- Spilosoma wilemani (Rothschild, 1914)

=== Species questionably separated into Spilarctia ===
- Spilosoma ericsoni (Semper, 1899)

plus many more.

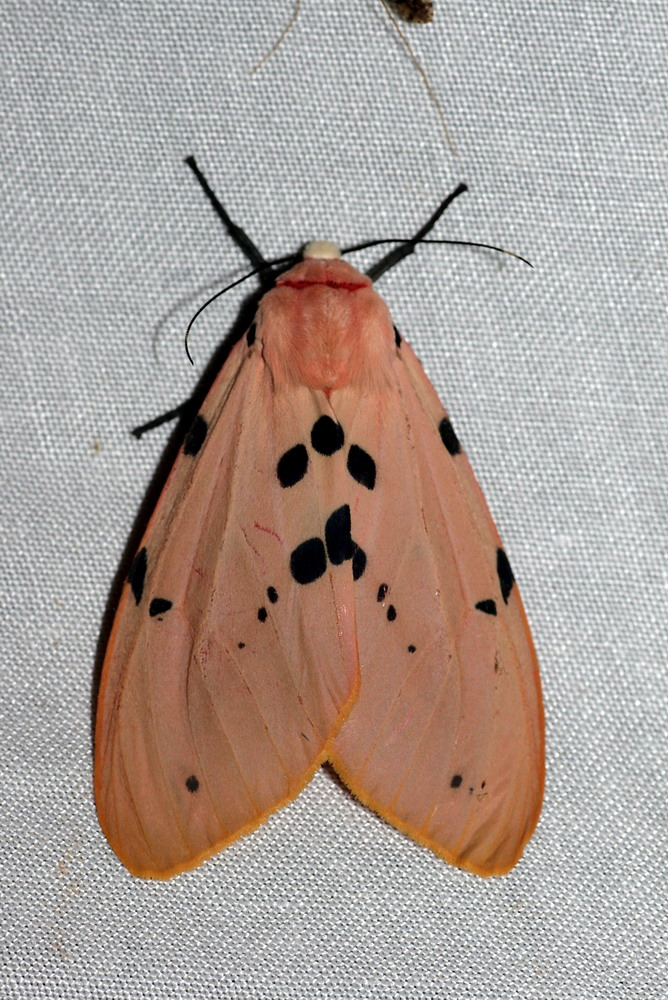
Spilarctia ericsoni

also see

- Spilosoma sumatrana (Swinhoe, 1905)
- Spilosoma wildi De Vos, 2013
- Spilosoma withaari De Vos, 2013

=== Species separated into Ardices ===
- Spilosoma canescens Butler, 1875 – dark-spotted tiger moth
- Spilosoma curvata Donovan, 1805 – crimson tiger moth
- Spilosoma glatignyi (Le Guillou, 1841) – black and white tiger moth

=== Species separated into Toulgarctia ===
- Spilosoma griveaudi (Toulgoët, 1957)
- Spilosoma luteoradians (Toulgoët, 1954)
- Spilosoma milloti (Toulgoët, 1954)
- Spilosoma viettei (Toulgoët, 1954)
- Spilosoma vieui (Toulgoët, 1957)
