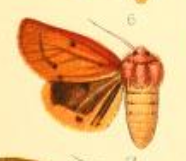

Scientific classification
- Kingdom: Animalia
- Phylum: Arthropoda
- Class: Insecta
- Order: Lepidoptera
- Superfamily: Noctuoidea
- Family: Erebidae
- Subfamily: Arctiinae
- Genus: Spilosoma
- Species: S. pteridis

Binomial name
- Spilosoma pteridis H. Edwards, 1875

Synonyms
- Antarctia rubra Neumoegen, 1881

= Spilosoma pteridis =

Brown tiger moth

Species of moth

Spilosoma pteridis, the brown tiger moth, is a moth in the family Erebidae. It was described by Henry Edwards in 1875. It is found in the United States in western Oregon and Washington, British Columbia and northern Idaho. The habitat consists of wet forests west of the Cascades, including coastal rainforests, low elevation mixed hardwood-conifer forests, as well as higher elevation conifer forests in the Cascades.

The length of the forewings is 11–13 mm. Adults are on wing from late spring to early August.

The larvae probably feed on various herbaceous plants.

== Subspecies ==
There are two subspecies:

- Spilosoma pteridis pteridis
- Spilosoma pteridis rubra (Neumoegen, 1881)
