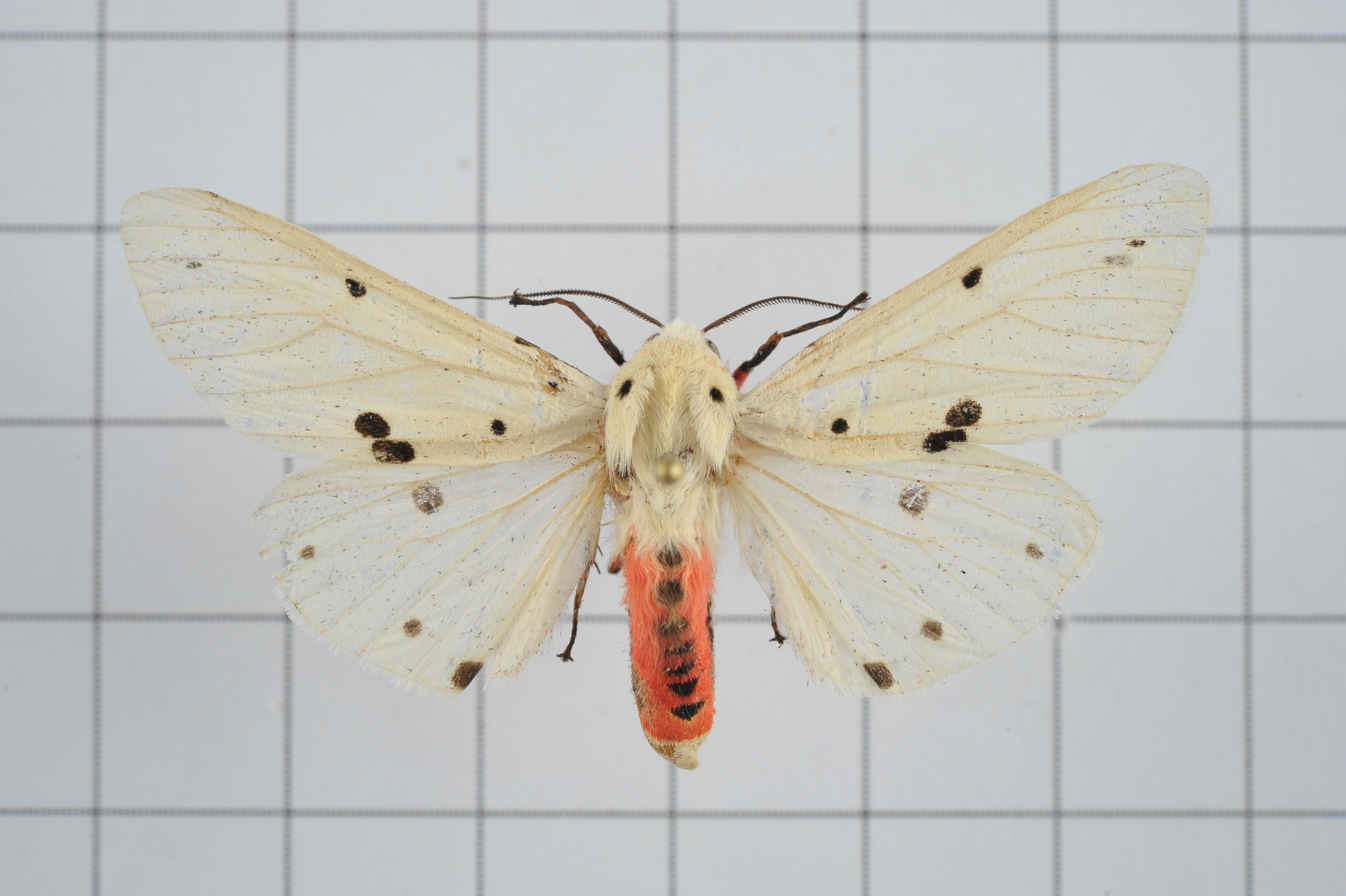

Scientific classification
- Domain: Eukaryota
- Kingdom: Animalia
- Phylum: Arthropoda
- Class: Insecta
- Order: Lepidoptera
- Superfamily: Noctuoidea
- Family: Erebidae
- Subfamily: Arctiinae
- Genus: Spilarctia
- Species: S. alba

Binomial name
- Spilarctia alba (Bremer & Grey, 1853)

Synonyms
- Chelonia alba Bremer & Grey, 1853; Spilosoma alba (Bremer & Grey, 1853); Spilosoma robustum Leech, 1899; Spilosoma robusta Leech, 1899; Spilarctia robusta (Leech, 1899); Spilarctia robusta tapaishani Daniel, 1943; Diacrisia robusta hainana Rothschild, 1910; Spilosoma robusta hainana; Spilarctia robusta hainana; Diacrisia kikuchii Matsumura, 1927; Spilosoma robusta kikuchii; Spilarctia robusta kikuchii; Diacrisia baibarana Matsumura, 1927

= Spilarctia alba =

Species of moth

Spilarctia alba is a moth in the family Erebidae. It was described by Otto Vasilievich Bremer and William Grey in 1853. It is found in China (Beijing, Hebei, Hubei, Hunan, Shaanxi, Jiangxi, Zhejiang, Fujian, Sichuan, Yunnan, Guizhou), Taiwan and Korea.

== Subspecies ==
- Spilarctia alba alba
- Spilarctia alba hainana (Rothschild, 1910)
- Spilarctia alba kikuchii (Matsumura, 1927)
