= Max Bartel =

German entomologist

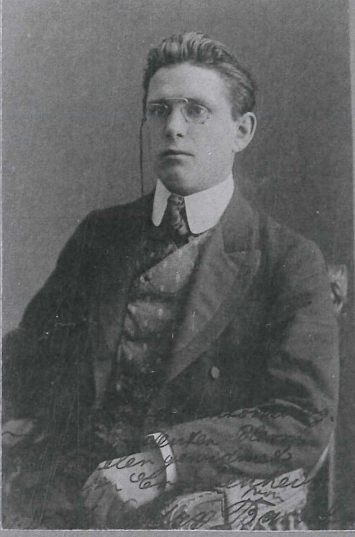

Max Bartel (1879 – 2 July 1914, Nürnberg) was a German entomologist, who erected the Ischnarctia genus in 1903.

Bartel was an insect dealer (Insektenhändler) in Berlin. He specialised in Lepidoptera. He edited Die palaearktischen Grossschmetterlinge und ihre Naturgeschichte. Band 1. Leipzig, (a monograph on butterflies) with Fritz Rühl and wrote pars Sesiidae in Adalbert Seitz Macrolepidoptera of the World - Bartel, M., 1912.– 24. Familie: Ageriidae (Sesiidae) pp. 375–416, pl. 51–52, In A. Seitz (Ed.), 1906–1913.Gross-Schmett.Erde, 2: 479 pp., 56 pls.
