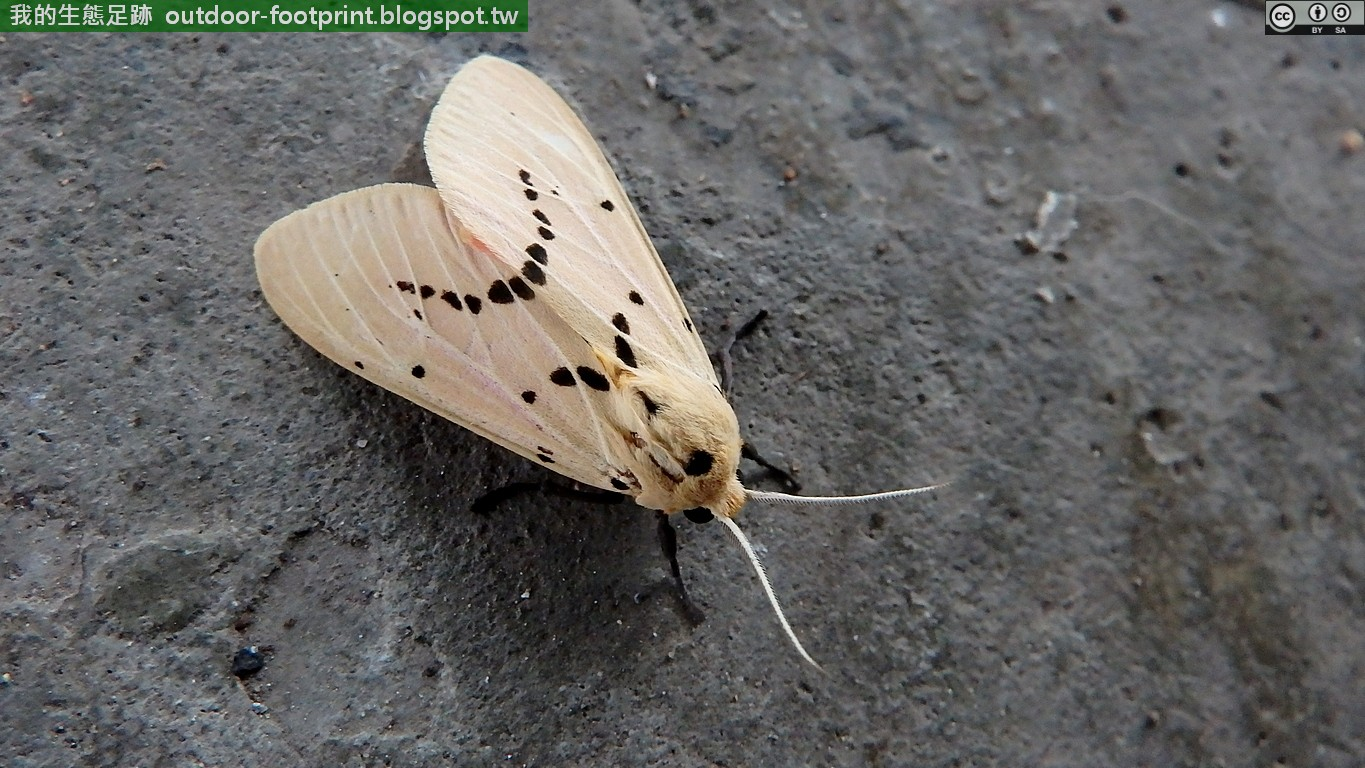
- Spilarctia postrubida

Scientific classification
- Kingdom: Animalia
- Phylum: Arthropoda
- Clade: Pancrustacea
- Class: Insecta
- Order: Lepidoptera
- Superfamily: Noctuoidea
- Family: Erebidae
- Subfamily: Arctiinae
- Subtribe: Spilosomina
- Genus: Spilarctia; Butler, 1875

Synonyms
- Olistheria Hübner, 1820

= Spilarctia =

Genus of moths

Spilarctia is a genus of moths in the family Erebidae. The genus was erected by Arthur Gardiner Butler in 1875. Several published lists exist, plus additional online, e.g. Dubatolov, 2005, Dubatolov, 2012.

== Subgenus Spilarctia ==
- accensa species group
  - Spilarctia accensa (Swinhoe, 1903)
  - Spilarctia ericsoni (Semper, 1899)
  - Spilarctia rhodochroa (Hampson, 1916)
  - Spilarctia rubriventris (Talbot, 1926)
- ananda species group
  - Spilarctia ananda (Roepke, 1938)
  - Spilarctia groganae (Holloway, 1976)
  - Spilarctia irina Dubatolov, 2006
- bisecta species group
  - Spilarctia bisecta (Leech, [1889])
  - Spilarctia dalbergiae Moore, 1888
  - Spilarctia graminivora Inoue, 1988
  - Spilarctia lungtani Daniel, 1943
  - Spilarctia subtestacea (Rothschild, 1910)
- casigneta species group
  - Spilarctia adumbrata (Thomas, 1994)
  - Spilarctia borneensis (Rothschild, 1910)
  - Spilarctia casigneta (Kollar, [1844])
  - Spilarctia fumida (Wileman, 1910)
  - Spilarctia roseata (Rothschild, 1910)
  - Spilarctia rubilinea (Moore, [1866])
  - Spilarctia rufofusca (Thomas, 1994)
  - Spilarctia sagittifera Moore, 1888
  - Spilarctia sinica Daniel, 1943
  - Spilarctia tamangi (Thomas, 1994)
  - Spilarctia variata Daniel, 1943
  - Spilarctia xanthogaster (Thomas, 1994)
  - Spilarctia xanthogastes Fang, 2000
  - Spilarctia xanthosoma (Roepke, 1954)
- hypogopa species group
  - Spilarctia daltonica (Černý, 2011)
  - Spilarctia hypogopa (Hampson, 1907)
  - Spilarctia flavorubida Dubatolov, 2006
  - Spilarctia moorei Snellen, 1879
  - Spilarctia philippina Dubatolov & Kishida, 2006
  - Spilarctia postrubida (Wileman, 1910)
- leopardina species group
  - Spilarctia inayatullahi Dubatolov & Gurko, 2004
  - Spilarctia leopardina (Kollar, 1844)
  - Spilarctia melanostigma (Erschoff, 1872)
- lutea species group
  - Spilarctia lutea (Hufnagel, 1766)
  - Spilarctia seriatopunctata (Motschulsky, [1861])
- nydia species group
  - Spilarctia nydia Butler, 1875
  - Spilarctia semperi (Rothschild, 1910)
- obliqua species group
  - Spilarctia montana (Guérin-Ménéville in Delesserte, 1843)
  - Spilarctia obliqua (Walker, 1855)
- punctata species group
  - Spilarctia caloscopium (Černý, 2011)
  - Spilarctia congruenta (Thomas, [1993])
  - Spilarctia denigrata (Thomas, [1993])
  - Spilarctia gopara (Moore, [1860])
  - Spilarctia hosei (Rothschild, 1910)
  - Spilarctia kareli (Thomas, [1993])
  - Spilarctia mahaplaga (Černý, 2011)
  - Spilarctia murzini Dubatolov, 2005
  - Spilarctia percellens (Thomas, [1993])
  - Spilarctia phaea (Hampson, 1901)
  - Spilarctia procedra (Swinhoe, 1907)
  - Spilarctia punctata (Moore, 1859)
  - Spilarctia siberuta Dubatolov, 2006
  - Spilarctia thomasi (Holloway, 1988)
  - Spilarctia ummera Swinhoe, [1890]
  - Spilarctia ummeroides (Černý, 2011)
  - Spilarctia virgulae (Černý, 2011)
- "dinawa species group" (unpublished but as listed by Dubatolov)
  - Spilarctia adriani (De Vos & Suhartawan, 2011)
  - Spilarctia alberti (Rothschild, 1914)
  - Spilarctia biagi (Bethune-Baker, 1908)
  - Spilarctia cinnamomea (De Vos & Suhartawan, 2011)
  - Spilarctia dinawa (Bethune-Baker, 1904)
  - Spilarctia kebea (Bethune-Baker, 1904)
  - Spilarctia owgarra (Bethune-Baker, 1908)
  - Spilarctia pratti (Bethune-Baker, 1904)
  - Spilarctia rubribasis (Joicey & Talbot in Joicey, Noakes & Talbot, 1916)
  - Spilarctia vulgaris (De Vos & Suhartawan, 2011)
  - Spilarctia wildi (De Vos, 2013) [Note: Placement per comment in De Vos, 2013 that belongs to "dinawa species group"]
- "styx species group" (unpublished but as listed by Dubatolov)
  - Spilarctia reticulata (Rothschild, 1933)
  - Spilarctia styx (Bethune-Baker, 1910)
  - Spilarctia withaari (De Vos, 2013) [Note: Placement per comment in De Vos, 2013 that belongs to "styx species group"]
- unplaced to species group
  - Spilarctia adelphus (Rothschild, 1920)
  - Spilarctia alba (Bremer & Grey, 1853)
  - Spilarctia albicornis (Hampson, 1900)
  - Spilarctia alisauskasi Dûda, Saldaitis & Volynkin, 2024
  - Spilarctia arctichroa (Druce, 1909)
  - Spilarctia ardens (Kishida, 1987)
  - Spilarctia aurocostata (Oberthür, 1911)
  - Spilarctia baltazarae (Černý, 1995)
  - Spilarctia bifascia Hampson, 1891
  - Spilarctia bifasciata Butler, 1881
  - Spilarctia bipunctata Daniel, 1943
  - Spilarctia brechlini (Černý, 2011)
  - Spilarctia brunnea (Heylaerts, 1890)
  - Spilarctia cadioui Thomas, 1989
  - Spilarctia cajetani (Rothschild, 1910)
  - Spilarctia castanea (Hampson, 1893)
  - Spilarctia chuanxina C.-L. Fang, 1982
  - Spilarctia clava (Wileman, 1910)
  - Spilarctia coccinea (Hampson, 1907)
  - Spilarctia comma (Walker, 1856)
  - Spilarctia contaminata (Wileman, 1910)
  - Spilarctia coorgensis Kirti & Gill, 2010
  - Spilarctia costata (Boisduval, 1832)
  - Spilarctia dohertyi (Rothschild, 1910)
  - Spilarctia duda Saldaitis & Pekarski, 2016
  - Spilarctia dukouensis C.-L. Fang, 1982
  - Spilarctia dzyta Dûda, Saldaitis & Volynkin, 2024
  - Spilarctia eldorado (Rothschild, 1910)
  - Spilarctia enarotali (De Vos & Suhartawan, 2011)
  - Spilarctia extirpata (Černý, 2009)
  - Spilarctia fidelia (Černý, 2011)
  - Spilarctia fraterna (Rothschild, 1910
  - Spilarctia gianellii (Oberthür, 1911)
  - Spilarctia grandimacula (De Vos & Suhartawan, 2011)
  - Spilarctia hampsoni (Joicey & Talbot, 1916)
  - Spilarctia harlequina (Černý, 2011)
  - Spilarctia hetera (Černý, 2009)
  - Spilarctia holobrunnea (Joicey & Talbot in Joicey, Noakes & Talbot, 1916)
  - Spilarctia hypsoides (Rothschild, 1914)
  - Spilarctia inexpectata (Rothschild, 1933)
  - Spilarctia irregularis (Rothschild, 1910)
  - Spilarctia javana (Rothschild, 1910)
  - Spilarctia leopoldi (Tams, 1935)
  - Spilarctia longiramia (Hampson, 1901)
  - Spilarctia mastrigti (De Vos & Suhartawan, 2011)
  - Spilarctia metaxantha (Hampson, 1901)
  - Spilarctia mona (Swinhoe, 1885)
  - Spilarctia motuonica C.-L. Fang, 1982
  - Spilarctia nana (De Vos & Suhartawan, 2011)
  - Spilarctia nigrovittatus (Matsumura, 1911)
  - Spilarctia nobilis (Turner, 1940)
  - Spilarctia novaeguineae (Rothschild, 1913)
  - Spilarctia oberthueri (Semper, 1899)
  - Spilarctia obliquizonata (Miyake, 1910)
  - Spilarctia pallidivena (Černý, 2009)
  - Spilarctia persimilis (Rothschild, 1914)
  - Spilarctia postbrunnea (De Vos & Suhartawan, 2011)
  - Spilarctia quercii (Oberthür, 1911)
  - Spilarctia rhodius (Rothschild, 1920)
  - Spilarctia rostagnoi (Oberthür, 1911)
  - Spilarctia ruficosta (Joicey & Talbot in Joicey, Noakes & Talbot, 1916)
  - Spilarctia semialbescens (Talbot, 1929)
  - Spilarctia sparsalis (Walker, [1865])
  - Spilarctia subcarnea (Walker, 1855)
  - Spilarctia tengchongensis Fang & Cao, 1984
  - Spilarctia terminicomma (Černý, 2009)
  - Spilarctia tigrina (Moore, 1879)
  - Spilarctia todara (Moore, 1872)
  - Spilarctia toxopei (Roepke, 1954)
  - Spilarctia transversa (De Vos & Suhartawan, 2011)
  - Spilarctia vandepolli (Rothschild, 1910)
  - Spilarctia venata (Wileman, 1915)
  - Spilarctia victorina (Černý, 2011)
  - Spilarctia wernerthomasi (De Vos & Suhartawan, 2011)
  - Spilarctia whiteheadi (Rothschild, 1910)
  - Spilarctia wilemani (Rothschild, 1914)
  - Spilarctia yukikoae Kishida, 1995
  - Spilarctia zhangmuna C.-L. Fang, 1982

== Subgenus Rhodareas Kirby, 1892 ==
- Spilarctia melanopsis (Walker, [1865])

== Subgenus Praephragmatobia Dubatolov & Y. Kishida, 2010 ==
- cervina species group
  - Spilarctia cervina (Wallengren, 1860)
  - Spilarctia griseabrunnea (Holloway, 1976)
  - Spilarctia rubescens (Walker, 1855)
- philippinica species group
  - Spilarctia mindanao Dubatolov & Y. Kishida, 2010
  - Spilarctia mollis (Černý, 2011)
  - Spilarctia palawana Dubatolov & Y. Kishida, 2010
  - Spilarctia philippinica Dubatolov & Kishida, 2010
- strigatula species group
  - Spilarctia gurkoi Dubatolov & Y. Kishida, 2010
  - Spilarctia strigatula (Walker, 1855)
- sumatrana species group
  - Spilarctia continentalis (Rothschild, 1910)
  - Spilarctia sumatrana (Swinhoe, 1905)

== Taxonomy ==
Spilarctia species are often included in Spilosoma.

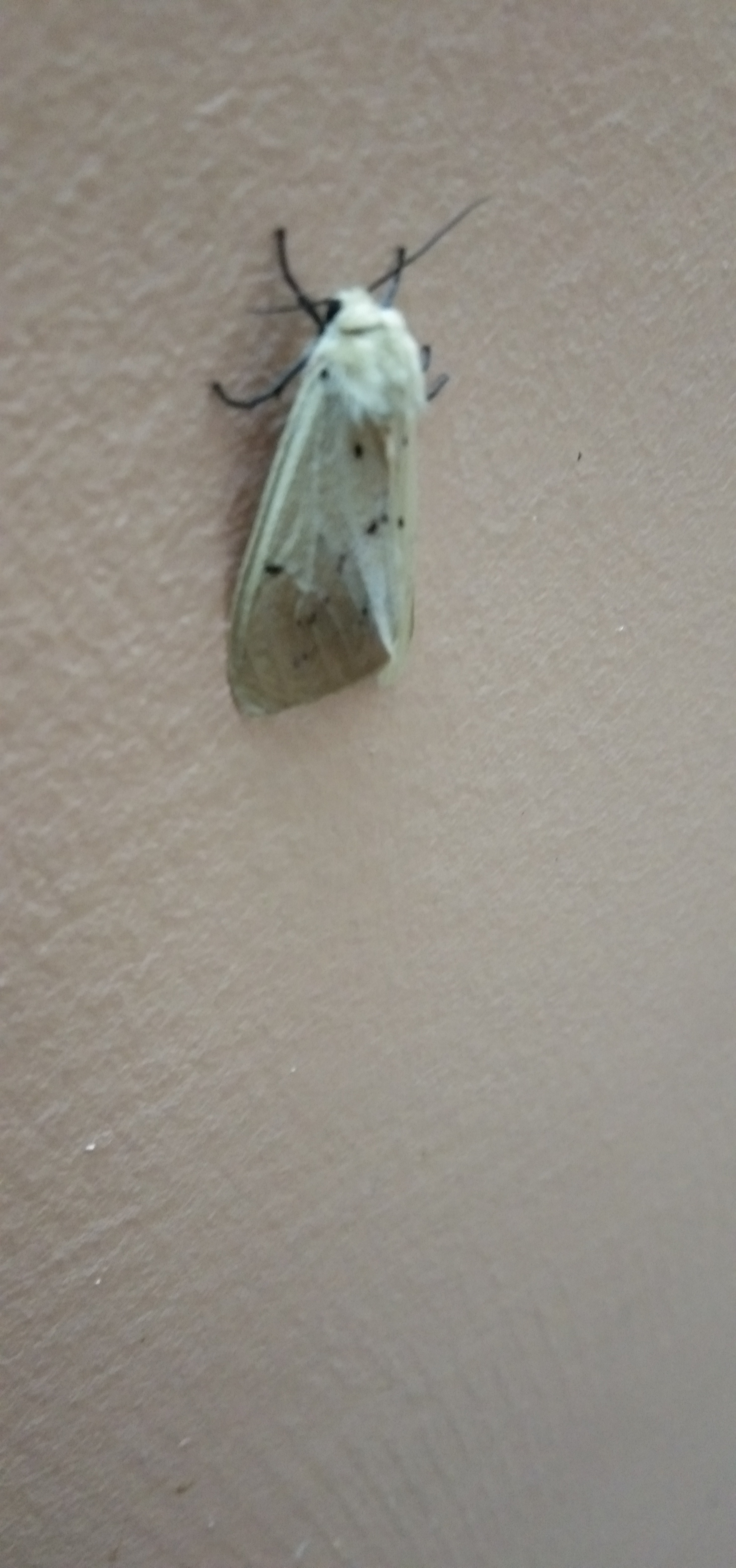
Spilarctia
