= Spilarctia comma =

Scientific classification
- Kingdom: Animalia
- Phylum: Arthropoda
- Clade: Pancrustacea
- Class: Insecta
- Order: Lepidoptera
- Superfamily: Noctuoidea
- Family: Erebidae
- Subfamily: Arctiinae
- Genus: Spilarctia
- Species: S. comma

Binomial name
- Spilarctia comma (Walker, 1856)

Synonyms
- Aloa comma Walker, 1856; Spilosoma comma (Walker, 1856); Spilosoma abdominalis Moore, 1859 [1860]; Spilosoma comma wittmeri Toulgoët, 1975

Species of moth

Spilarctia comma is a moth in the family Erebidae. It was described by Francis Walker in 1856. It is found in Tibet in China and in Bhutan.

== Subspecies ==
- Spilarctia comma comma (Walker, 1856) Tibet
- Spilarctia comma wittmeri (Toulgoët, 1975) Bhutan
