= Spilarctia rubilinea =

Scientific classification
- Domain: Eukaryota
- Kingdom: Animalia
- Phylum: Arthropoda
- Class: Insecta
- Order: Lepidoptera
- Superfamily: Noctuoidea
- Family: Erebidae
- Subfamily: Arctiinae
- Genus: Spilarctia
- Species: S. rubilinea

Binomial name
- Spilarctia rubilinea (Moore, [1866])

Synonyms
- Spilosoma rubilinea Moore, 1865 [1866]; Spilosoma discinigra Moore, 1865 [1866]; Diacrisia montana brunnea Rothschild, 1910; Diacrisia montana heylaertsi Rothschild, 1914

Species of moth

Spilarctia rubilinea is a moth in the family Erebidae. It was described by Frederic Moore in 1866. It is found in Nepal, India (Sikkim, Assam), Bhutan, Myanmar, Vietnam and China (Sichuan, Tibet).
