= Spilarctia grandimacula =

Scientific classification
- Domain: Eukaryota
- Kingdom: Animalia
- Phylum: Arthropoda
- Class: Insecta
- Order: Lepidoptera
- Superfamily: Noctuoidea
- Family: Erebidae
- Subfamily: Arctiinae
- Genus: Spilarctia
- Species: S. grandimacula

Binomial name
- Spilarctia grandimacula (De Vos & Suhartawan, 2011)

Synonyms
- Spilosoma grandimacula De Vos & Suhartawan, 2011

Species of moth

Spilarctia grandimacula is a moth in the family Erebidae. It was described by Rob de Vos and Daawia Suhartawan in 2011. It is found in Papua and Papua New Guinea. It has been recorded from the Central Mountains in western Papua, east into Papua New Guinea.
