= Spilarctia graminivora =

Scientific classification
- Kingdom: Animalia
- Phylum: Arthropoda
- Class: Insecta
- Order: Lepidoptera
- Superfamily: Noctuoidea
- Family: Erebidae
- Subfamily: Arctiinae
- Genus: Spilarctia
- Species: S. graminivora

Binomial name
- Spilarctia graminivora Inoue, 1988

Synonyms
- Spilosoma bisecta Inoue, 1982 (nec Leech)

Species of moth

Spilarctia graminivora is a moth in the family Erebidae. It was described by Hiroshi Inoue in 1988. It is found in Japan (the Ryukyu Islands) and Taiwan.
