= Spilarctia leopoldi =

Scientific classification
- Domain: Eukaryota
- Kingdom: Animalia
- Phylum: Arthropoda
- Class: Insecta
- Order: Lepidoptera
- Superfamily: Noctuoidea
- Family: Erebidae
- Subfamily: Arctiinae
- Genus: Spilarctia
- Species: S. leopoldi

Binomial name
- Spilarctia leopoldi (Tams, 1935)

Synonyms
- Diacrisia leopoldi Tams, 1935; Spilosoma leopoldi

Species of moth

Spilarctia leopoldi is a moth of the family Erebidae. It was described by Willie Horace Thomas Tams in 1935. It is found on Sulawesi in Indonesia.
