= Spilarctia quercii =

Scientific classification
- Domain: Eukaryota
- Kingdom: Animalia
- Phylum: Arthropoda
- Class: Insecta
- Order: Lepidoptera
- Superfamily: Noctuoidea
- Family: Erebidae
- Subfamily: Arctiinae
- Genus: Spilarctia
- Species: S. quercii

Binomial name
- Spilarctia quercii (Oberthür, 1911)

Synonyms
- Estigmene quercii Oberthür, 1911; Spilosoma quercii (Oberthür, 1911); Spilarctia nigrodorsata Reich, 1932; Spilarctia minschani O. Bang-Haas, 1938

Species of moth

Spilarctia quercii is a moth in the family Erebidae. It was described by Charles Oberthür in 1911. It is found in the Chinese provinces of Sichuan, Gansu, Shanxi, Shaanxi, Qinghai, Hubei, Yunnan and Hunan.
