= Spilarctia longiramia =

Scientific classification
- Kingdom: Animalia
- Phylum: Arthropoda
- Class: Insecta
- Order: Lepidoptera
- Superfamily: Noctuoidea
- Family: Erebidae
- Subfamily: Arctiinae
- Genus: Spilarctia
- Species: S. longiramia

Binomial name
- Spilarctia longiramia (Hampson, 1901)

Synonyms
- Diacrisia longiramia Hampson, 1901; Spilosoma longiramia (Hampson, 1901); Spilosoma holophaeum Roepke, 1954

Species of moth

Spilarctia longiramia is a moth in the family Erebidae. It was described by George Hampson in 1901. It is found on Java and Sumatra.
