= Spilarctia rhodius =

Scientific classification
- Domain: Eukaryota
- Kingdom: Animalia
- Phylum: Arthropoda
- Class: Insecta
- Order: Lepidoptera
- Superfamily: Noctuoidea
- Family: Erebidae
- Subfamily: Arctiinae
- Genus: Spilarctia
- Species: S. rhodius

Binomial name
- Spilarctia rhodius (Rothschild, 1920)

Synonyms
- Diacrisia rhodius Rothschild, 1920; Spilosoma rhodius (Rothschild, 1920)

Species of moth

Spilarctia rhodius is a moth in the family Erebidae. It was described by Walter Rothschild in 1920. It is found on Sumatra in Indonesia.
