= Spilarctia obliquizonata =

Scientific classification
- Domain: Eukaryota
- Kingdom: Animalia
- Phylum: Arthropoda
- Class: Insecta
- Order: Lepidoptera
- Superfamily: Noctuoidea
- Family: Erebidae
- Subfamily: Arctiinae
- Genus: Spilarctia
- Species: S. obliquizonata

Binomial name
- Spilarctia obliquizonata (Miyake, 1910)

Synonyms
- Diacrisia obliquizonata Miyake, 1910; Spilosoma obliquizonata (Miyake, 1910); Diacrisia hirayamae Matsumura, 1927

Species of moth

Spilarctia obliquizonata is a moth in the family Erebidae. It was described by Tsunekata Miyake in 1910. It is found in the Russian Far East (southern Sakhalin, Kunashir) and Japan.
