= Spilarctia adumbrata =

Scientific classification
- Domain: Eukaryota
- Kingdom: Animalia
- Phylum: Arthropoda
- Class: Insecta
- Order: Lepidoptera
- Superfamily: Noctuoidea
- Family: Erebidae
- Subfamily: Arctiinae
- Genus: Spilarctia
- Species: S. adumbrata

Binomial name
- Spilarctia adumbrata (Thomas, 1994)

Synonyms
- Spilosoma adumbrata Thomas, 1994

Species of moth

Spilarctia adumbrata is a moth in the family Erebidae. It was described by Thomas in 1994. It is found on Sumatra.
