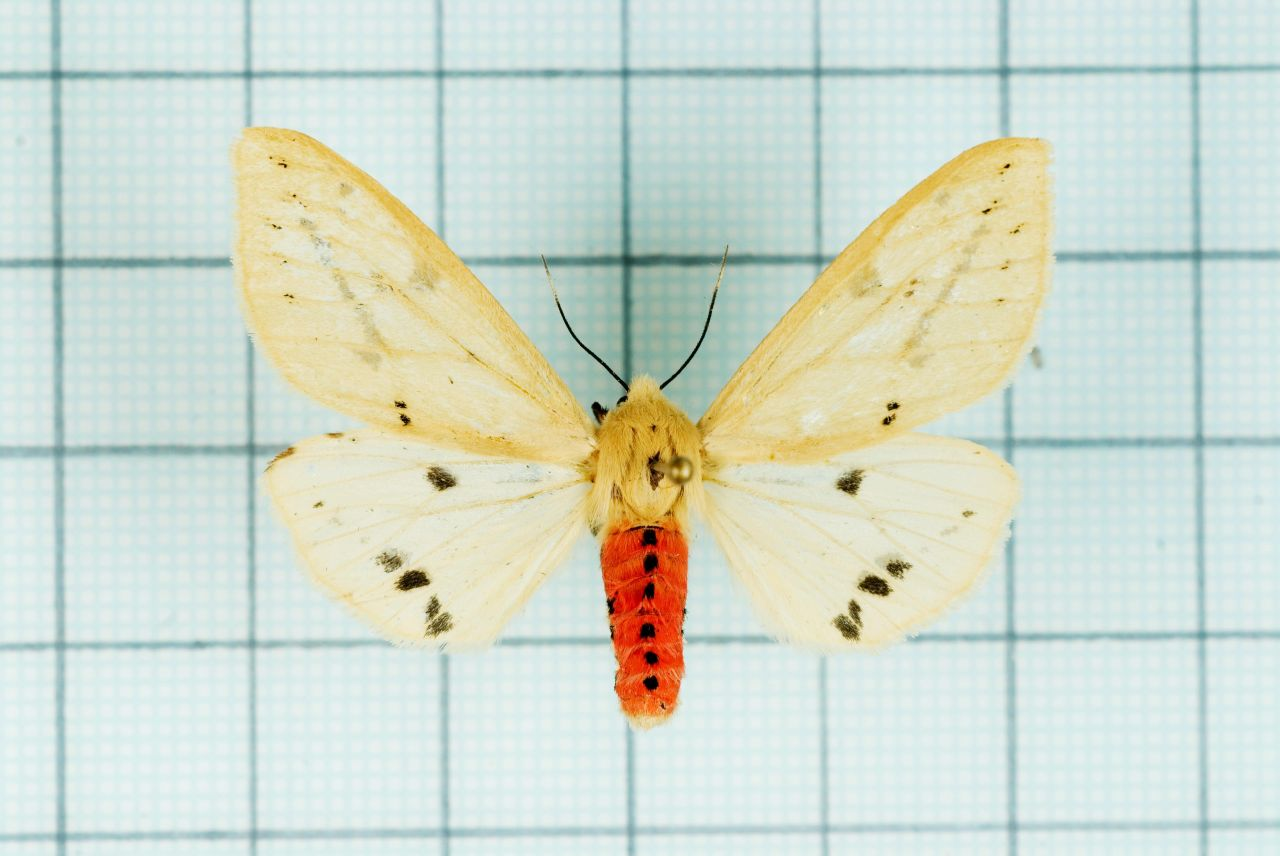

Scientific classification
- Kingdom: Animalia
- Phylum: Arthropoda
- Class: Insecta
- Order: Lepidoptera
- Superfamily: Noctuoidea
- Family: Erebidae
- Subfamily: Arctiinae
- Genus: Spilosoma
- Species: S. sagittifera

Binomial name
- Spilosoma sagittifera (Moore, 1888)

Synonyms
- Spilarctia sagittifera Moore, 1888; Diacrisia taiwanensis Matsumura, 1927; Spilosoma taiwanensis; Spilarctia taiwanensis; Spilosoma casigneta Koll., 1884

= Spilosoma sagittifera =

Species of moth

Spilosoma sagittifera is a species of moth of the family Erebidae. It was described by Frederic Moore in 1888. It is found in India, Nepal, China and Taiwan.

== Taxonomy ==
Lepindex considers Spilosoma sagittifera to be a synonym for Spilosoma casigneta Kollar, 1884.

== Description ==
Male and female are paler and of a uniformly yellower tint than S. casigneta. Forewing with similar markings, the transverse discal series of spots more oblique, touching the lower angle of the cell and terminating in larger spots on middle of posterior margin; one or two spots also within the cell near the base; hindwing paler yellow throughout, spots larger than in S. casigneta. Abdomen crimson, with more or less prominent black dorsal and lateral spots; a small black sagittate streak on middle of thorax. Underside paler, not washed with crimson, markings more distinct.

The wingspan for the male is 1 3/4 inches (44 mm) and the female is 2 1/2 inches (64 mm).

== Subspecies ==
- Spilosoma sagittifera sagittifera (north-western and eastern Himalayas, Nepal)
- Spilosoma sagittifera chekiangi Daniel, 1943 (China: Zhejiang, Shaanxi, Sichuan)
- Spilosoma sagittifera fukieni Daniel, 1943 (China: Fujian)
- Spilosoma sagittifera taiwanensis (Matsumura, 1927) (Taiwan)
