= Spilarctia irina =

Scientific classification
- Kingdom: Animalia
- Phylum: Arthropoda
- Clade: Pancrustacea
- Class: Insecta
- Order: Lepidoptera
- Superfamily: Noctuoidea
- Family: Erebidae
- Subfamily: Arctiinae
- Genus: Spilarctia
- Species: S. irina

Binomial name
- Spilarctia irina Dubatolov, 2006

Species of moth

Spilarctia irina is a moth in the family Erebidae. It was described by Vladimir Viktorovitch Dubatolov in 2006. It is found in western Indonesia.
