= Spilarctia motuonica =

Scientific classification
- Kingdom: Animalia
- Phylum: Arthropoda
- Clade: Pancrustacea
- Class: Insecta
- Order: Lepidoptera
- Superfamily: Noctuoidea
- Family: Erebidae
- Subfamily: Arctiinae
- Genus: Spilarctia
- Species: S. motuonica

Binomial name
- Spilarctia motuonica C. L. Fang, 1982

Synonyms
- Spilosoma motuonica C. L. Fang, 1982

Species of moth

Spilarctia motuonica is a moth in the family Erebidae. It was described by Cheng-Lai Fang in 1982. It is found in China (Tibet).
