= Spilarctia murzini =

Scientific classification
- Kingdom: Animalia
- Phylum: Arthropoda
- Clade: Pancrustacea
- Class: Insecta
- Order: Lepidoptera
- Superfamily: Noctuoidea
- Family: Erebidae
- Subfamily: Arctiinae
- Genus: Spilarctia
- Species: S. murzini

Binomial name
- Spilarctia murzini Dubatolov, 2005

Species of moth

Spilarctia murzini is a moth in the family Erebidae. It is found in Shaanxi, China, and was described by Vladimir Viktorovitch Dubatolov in 2005.
