= Spilarctia rufofusca =

Scientific classification
- Domain: Eukaryota
- Kingdom: Animalia
- Phylum: Arthropoda
- Class: Insecta
- Order: Lepidoptera
- Superfamily: Noctuoidea
- Family: Erebidae
- Subfamily: Arctiinae
- Genus: Spilarctia
- Species: S. rufofusca

Binomial name
- Spilarctia rufofusca (Thomas, 1994)

Synonyms
- Spilosoma rufofusca Thomas, 1994

Species of moth

Spilarctia rufofusca is a moth in the family Erebidae. It was described by Thomas in 1994. It is found on Sumatra in Indonesia.
