= Spilarctia coorgensis =

Scientific classification
- Domain: Eukaryota
- Kingdom: Animalia
- Phylum: Arthropoda
- Class: Insecta
- Order: Lepidoptera
- Superfamily: Noctuoidea
- Family: Erebidae
- Subfamily: Arctiinae
- Genus: Spilarctia
- Species: S. coorgensis

Binomial name
- Spilarctia coorgensis Kirti & Gill, 2010

Species of moth

Spilarctia coorgensis is a moth in the family Erebidae. It was described by Jagbir Singh Kirti and Navneet Singh Gill in 2010. It is found in Karnataka, India.
