= Spilarctia seriatopunctata =

Scientific classification
- Domain: Eukaryota
- Kingdom: Animalia
- Phylum: Arthropoda
- Class: Insecta
- Order: Lepidoptera
- Superfamily: Noctuoidea
- Family: Erebidae
- Subfamily: Arctiinae
- Genus: Spilarctia
- Species: S. seriatopunctata

Binomial name
- Spilarctia seriatopunctata (Motschulsky, [1861])

Synonyms
- Arctia seriatopunctata Motschulsky, [1861]; Spilarctia ione Butler, 1875; Spilarctia rosacea Butler, 1879; Spilarctia basilimbata Butler, 1881; Spilarctia casigneta sjoequisti Bryk, 1942; Spilosoma seriatopunctata azumai Inoue, 1982; Spilosoma seriatopunctata nudum Inoue, 1976; Spilosoma seriatopunctata suzukii Inoue & Maenami, 1963; Spilosoma striatopunctata Oberthür, 1879; Diacrisia seriatopunctata varians Bryk, 1948 [1949]

Species of moth

Spilarctia seriatopunctata is a moth in the family Erebidae. It was described by Victor Motschulsky in 1861. It is found in Russia (Middle Amur, Primorye, southern Sakhalin, southern Kuril Islands), China (Heilongjiang, Jilin, Jiangxi, Fujian, Sichuan, Shaanxi), Korea and Japan.

== Subspecies ==
- Spilarctia seriatopunctata seriatopunctata
- Spilarctia seriatopunctata azumai (Inoue, 1982)
- Spilarctia seriatopunctata nudum (Inoue, 1976)
- Spilarctia seriatopunctata striatopunctata (Oberthür, 1879)
- Spilarctia seriatopunctata suzukii (Inoue & Maenami, 1963)
