= Spilarctia venata =

Scientific classification
- Domain: Eukaryota
- Kingdom: Animalia
- Phylum: Arthropoda
- Class: Insecta
- Order: Lepidoptera
- Superfamily: Noctuoidea
- Family: Erebidae
- Subfamily: Arctiinae
- Genus: Spilarctia
- Species: S. venata

Binomial name
- Spilarctia venata Wileman, 1915

Synonyms
- Diacrisia venata Wileman, 1915; Spilosoma venata; Diacrisia venata ab. bipuncta Wileman, 1915

Species of moth

Spilarctia venata is a moth of the family Erebidae. It was described by Alfred Ernest Wileman in 1915. It is found in the Philippines.
