= Spilarctia inayatullahi =

Scientific classification
- Kingdom: Animalia
- Phylum: Arthropoda
- Clade: Pancrustacea
- Class: Insecta
- Order: Lepidoptera
- Superfamily: Noctuoidea
- Family: Erebidae
- Subfamily: Arctiinae
- Genus: Spilarctia
- Species: S. inayatullahi

Binomial name
- Spilarctia inayatullahi Dubatolov & Gurko, 2004

Species of moth

Spilarctia inayatullahi is a moth in the family Erebidae. It was described by Vladimir Viktorovitch Dubatolov and Vladimir O. Gurko in 2004. It is found in Pakistan.
