= Spilarctia owgarra =

Scientific classification
- Domain: Eukaryota
- Kingdom: Animalia
- Phylum: Arthropoda
- Class: Insecta
- Order: Lepidoptera
- Superfamily: Noctuoidea
- Family: Erebidae
- Subfamily: Arctiinae
- Genus: Spilarctia
- Species: S. owgarra

Binomial name
- Spilarctia owgarra (Bethune-Baker, 1908)

Synonyms
- Diacrisia owgarra Bethune-Baker, 1908; Spilosoma owgarra (Bethune-Baker, 1908); Diacrisia ougarra germanica Rothschild, 1910; Spilosoma owgarra germanica (Rothschild, 1910)

Species of moth

Spilarctia owgarra is a moth in the family of Erebidae. It was first described by George Thomas Bethune-Baker in 1908 in New Guinea. The habitat consists of mountainous areas.

== Subspecies ==
- Spilarctia owgarra owgarra (Papua, western and south-eastern Papua New Guinea)
- Spilarctia owgarra germanica (Rothschild, 1910) (north-eastern Papua New Guinea)
