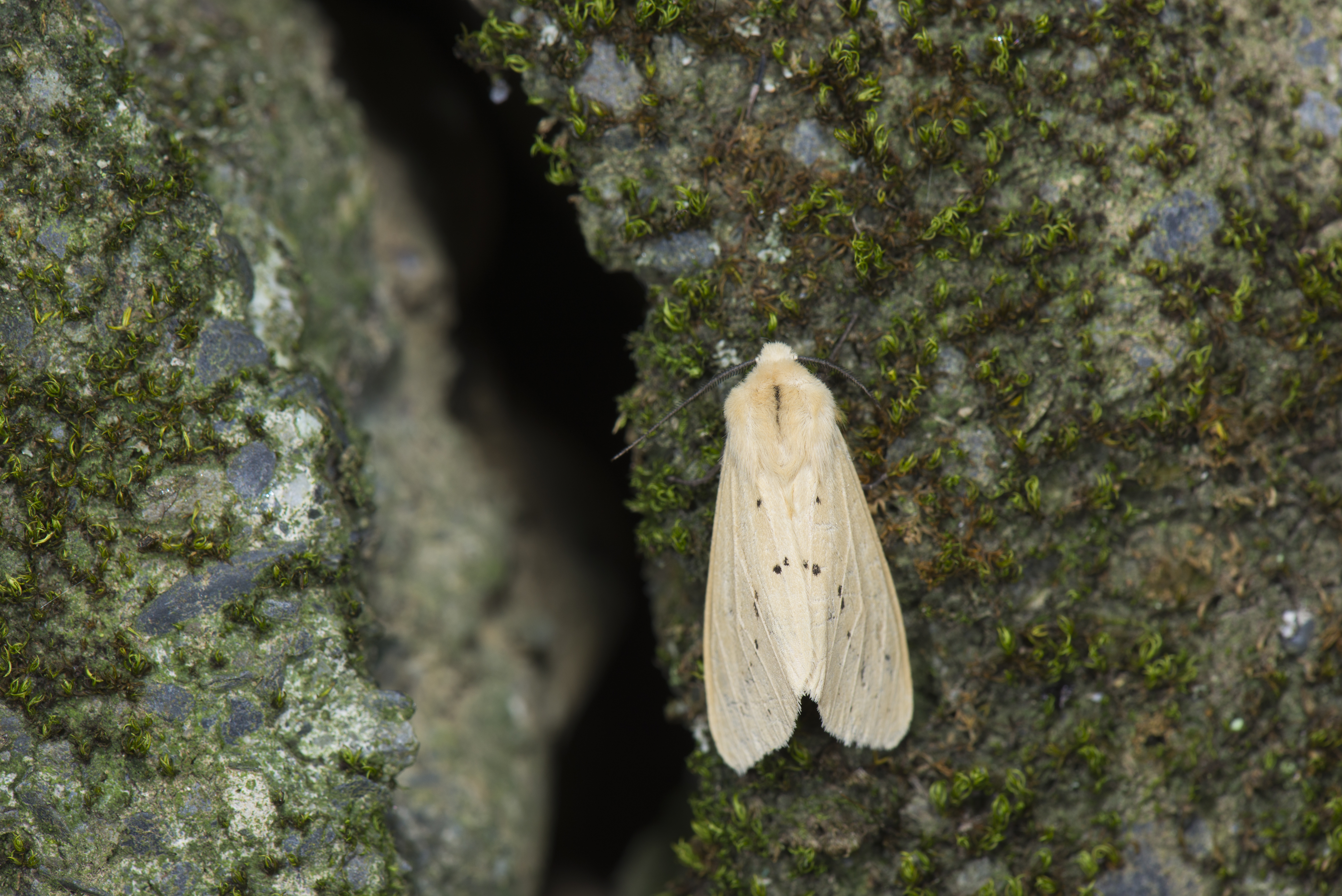

Scientific classification
- Domain: Eukaryota
- Kingdom: Animalia
- Phylum: Arthropoda
- Class: Insecta
- Order: Lepidoptera
- Superfamily: Noctuoidea
- Family: Erebidae
- Subfamily: Arctiinae
- Genus: Spilarctia
- Species: S. subtestacea

Binomial name
- Spilarctia subtestacea (Rothschild, 1910)

Synonyms
- Diacrisia subtestacea Rothschild, 1910; Spilosoma obliqua Hampson, 1920 (nec Walker); Diacrisia obliqua var. chosokeia Strand, 1922; Diacrisia takamukuana Matsumura, 1927; Spilarctia obliqua subtestacea Daniel, 1943; Spilarctia bisecta chosokeia Daniel, 1943

= Spilarctia subtestacea =

Species of moth

Spilarctia subtestacea is a moth in the family Erebidae. It was described by Walter Rothschild in 1910. It is found in Taiwan and Korea.
