= Spilarctia mollis =

Scientific classification
- Domain: Eukaryota
- Kingdom: Animalia
- Phylum: Arthropoda
- Class: Insecta
- Order: Lepidoptera
- Superfamily: Noctuoidea
- Family: Erebidae
- Subfamily: Arctiinae
- Genus: Spilarctia
- Species: S. mollis

Binomial name
- Spilarctia mollis (Černý, 2011)

Synonyms
- Spilosoma mollis Černý, 2011

Species of moth

Spilarctia mollis is a species of moth in the family Erebidae. It was first described by Karel Černý in 2011. It is found in the Philippines.
