= Spilarctia rubribasis =

Scientific classification
- Domain: Eukaryota
- Kingdom: Animalia
- Phylum: Arthropoda
- Class: Insecta
- Order: Lepidoptera
- Superfamily: Noctuoidea
- Family: Erebidae
- Subfamily: Arctiinae
- Genus: Spilarctia
- Species: S. rubribasis

Binomial name
- Spilarctia rubribasis (Joicey & Talbot in Joicey, Noakes & Talbot, 1916)

Synonyms
- Diacrisia rubribasis Joicey & Talbot in Joicey, Noakes & Talbot, 1916; Spilosoma rubribasis (Joicey & Talbot in Joicey, Noakes & Talbot, 1916)

Species of moth

Spilarctia rubribasis is a moth in the family Erebidae. It was described by James John Joicey and George Talbot in 1916. It is found on New Guinea, where it has been recorded from the Arfak Mountains, Kobowre Mountains, and the Jayawijaya Mountains in Papua.
