= Spilarctia oberthueri =

Scientific classification
- Domain: Eukaryota
- Kingdom: Animalia
- Phylum: Arthropoda
- Class: Insecta
- Order: Lepidoptera
- Superfamily: Noctuoidea
- Family: Erebidae
- Subfamily: Arctiinae
- Genus: Spilarctia
- Species: S. oberthueri

Binomial name
- Spilarctia oberthueri (Semper, 1899)

Synonyms
- Hyarias oberthüri Semper, 1899; Spilosoma oberthueri (Semper, 1899)

Species of moth

Spilarctia oberthueri is a moth in the family Erebidae. It was described by Georg Semper in 1899. It is found in the Philippines and possibly on Sulawesi.
