= Spilarctia punctata =

Scientific classification
- Domain: Eukaryota
- Kingdom: Animalia
- Phylum: Arthropoda
- Class: Insecta
- Order: Lepidoptera
- Superfamily: Noctuoidea
- Family: Erebidae
- Subfamily: Arctiinae
- Genus: Spilarctia
- Species: S. punctata

Binomial name
- Spilarctia punctata (Moore, 1859)

Synonyms
- Spilosoma punctata Moore, 1859; Diacrisia fuscitincta Hampson, 1901

Species of moth

Spilarctia punctata is a moth in the family Erebidae. It was described by Frederic Moore in 1859. It is found in India (Sikkim, Assam, Nagaland) in Myanmar and on Java and possibly Borneo.
