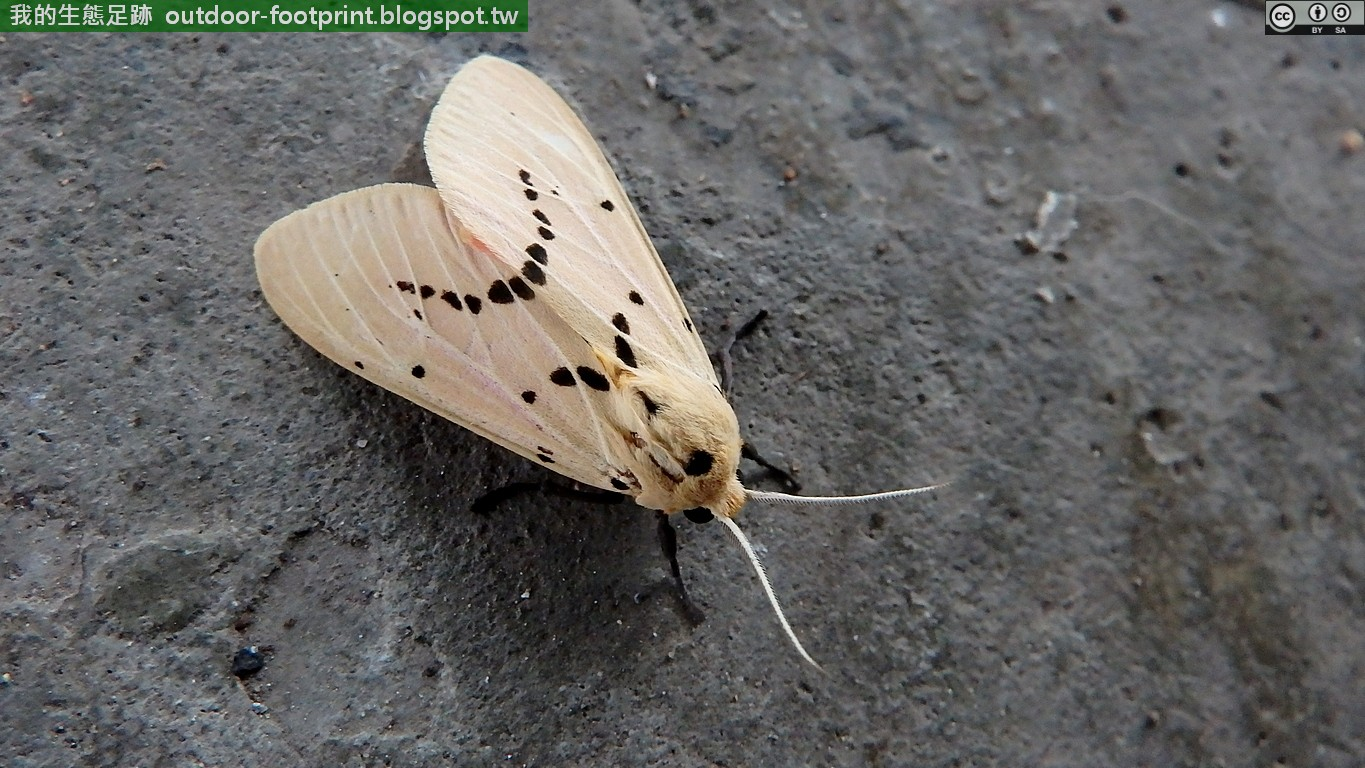

Scientific classification
- Domain: Eukaryota
- Kingdom: Animalia
- Phylum: Arthropoda
- Class: Insecta
- Order: Lepidoptera
- Superfamily: Noctuoidea
- Family: Erebidae
- Subfamily: Arctiinae
- Genus: Spilarctia
- Species: S. postrubida

Binomial name
- Spilarctia postrubida (Wileman, 1910)

Synonyms
- Aloa postrubida Wileman, 1910

= Spilarctia postrubida =

Species of moth

Spilarctia postrubida is a species of moth in the family Erebidae. It was described by Alfred Ernest Wileman in 1910. It is found in Taiwan, Japan's Ryukyu Islands and the Chinese provinces of Guangdong and Hainan.
