= Spilarctia pratti =

Scientific classification
- Domain: Eukaryota
- Kingdom: Animalia
- Phylum: Arthropoda
- Class: Insecta
- Order: Lepidoptera
- Superfamily: Noctuoidea
- Family: Erebidae
- Subfamily: Arctiinae
- Genus: Spilarctia
- Species: S. pratti

Binomial name
- Spilarctia pratti (Bethune-Baker, 1904)

Synonyms
- Diacrisia pratti Bethune-Baker, 1904; Spilosoma pratti (Bethune-Baker, 1904); Diacrisia eichhorni Rothschild, 1917; Spilosoma eichhorni (Rothschild, 1917); Spilosoma pratti eichhorni (Rothschild, 1917)

Species of moth

Spilarctia pratti is a moth in the family Erebidae. It was described by George Thomas Bethune-Baker in 1904. It is found in New Guinea.

== Subspecies ==
- Spilarctia pratti pratti
- Spilarctia pratti eichhorni (Rothschild, 1917)
