= Spilarctia adelphus =

Scientific classification
- Domain: Eukaryota
- Kingdom: Animalia
- Phylum: Arthropoda
- Class: Insecta
- Order: Lepidoptera
- Superfamily: Noctuoidea
- Family: Erebidae
- Subfamily: Arctiinae
- Genus: Spilarctia
- Species: S. adelphus

Binomial name
- Spilarctia adelphus (Rothschild, 1920)

Synonyms
- Diacrisia adelphus Rothschild, 1920; Spilosoma adelphus

Species of moth

Spilarctia adelphus is a moth of the family Erebidae. It was described by Walter Rothschild in 1920. It is found on Sumatra in Indonesia.
