= Spilarctia mahaplaga =

Scientific classification
- Kingdom: Animalia
- Phylum: Arthropoda
- Class: Insecta
- Order: Lepidoptera
- Superfamily: Noctuoidea
- Family: Erebidae
- Subfamily: Arctiinae
- Genus: Spilarctia
- Species: S. mahaplaga

Binomial name
- Spilarctia mahaplaga (Černý, 2011)

Synonyms
- Spilosoma mahaplaga Černý, 2011

Species of moth

Spilarctia mahaplaga is a moth in the family Erebidae. It was described by Karel Černý in 2011. It is found in the Philippines.
