= Spilarctia hampsoni =

Scientific classification
- Domain: Eukaryota
- Kingdom: Animalia
- Phylum: Arthropoda
- Class: Insecta
- Order: Lepidoptera
- Superfamily: Noctuoidea
- Family: Erebidae
- Subfamily: Arctiinae
- Genus: Spilarctia
- Species: S. hampsoni

Binomial name
- Spilarctia hampsoni (Joicey & Talbot, 1916)

Synonyms
- Diacrisia hampsoni Joicey & Talbot, 1916 (nec Rothschild, 1914); Spilosoma hampsoni

Species of moth

Spilarctia hampsoni is a moth in the family Erebidae. It was described by James John Joicey and George Talbot in 1916. It is found in Papua (Anggi Lakes, Bidogai, Langda, Mokndoma, Pass Valley) and Papua New Guinea (Mount Hagen).
