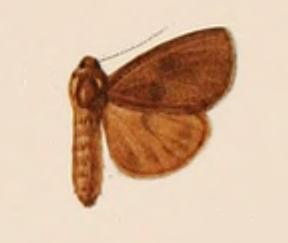

Scientific classification
- Kingdom: Animalia
- Phylum: Arthropoda
- Clade: Pancrustacea
- Class: Insecta
- Order: Lepidoptera
- Superfamily: Noctuoidea
- Family: Erebidae
- Subfamily: Arctiinae
- Genus: Spilarctia
- Species: S. sumatrana

Binomial name
- Spilarctia sumatrana (C. Swinhoe, 1905)

Synonyms
- Diacrisia sumatrana C. Swinhoe, 1905; Spilosoma sumatrana (Swinhoe, 1905); [?]Spilosoma javanica Rothschild, 1910

= Spilarctia sumatrana =

Species of moth

Spilarctia sumatrana is a moth of the family Erebidae. The revised combination Spilarctia (Praephragmatobia) sumatrana (Swinhoe, 1905) was published by Dubatolov & Kishida 2010. It was originally described as Diacrisia sumatrana by Charles Swinhoe in 1905. Some authors such as Hampson, 1920 have instead referred to it as Spilosoma sumatrana (Swinhoe, 1905). It is found in Indonesia on Sumatra & Java and also in Malaysia.

== Description ==
The male moth is dull reddish brown; its antennae are whitish; the palpi and frons are darker brown; abdomen with very faint crimson tinge, dorsal and lateral series of obscure black spots. Forewing with anteromedial series of indistinct small dark spots, very oblique from costa to median nervure, then inwardly oblique; small indistinct spots at angles of cell and a series from lower angle to inner margin; traces of a subterminal series of dark points placed in pairs on each side of the veins; some slight points on termen. Hindwing with a very faint crimson tinge; an indistinct diffused dark discoidal patch and maculate subterminal band. Its wingspan 36 mm.
