= Spilarctia bisecta =

Scientific classification
- Domain: Eukaryota
- Kingdom: Animalia
- Phylum: Arthropoda
- Class: Insecta
- Order: Lepidoptera
- Superfamily: Noctuoidea
- Family: Erebidae
- Subfamily: Arctiinae
- Genus: Spilarctia
- Species: S. bisecta

Binomial name
- Spilarctia bisecta (Leech, [1889])

Synonyms
- Spilosoma bisecta Leech, [1889]; Spilosoma howqua Moore, 1877; Spilosoma mandarina Moore, 1877; Spilarctia bisecta shanghaiensis Daniel, 1943; Diacrisia obliqua occidentalis Rothschild, 1914; Diacrisia obliqua hainingensis Strand, 1919

Species of moth

Spilarctia bisecta is a moth in the family Erebidae. It was described by John Henry Leech in 1889. It is found in China (Shanghai, Hong Kong, Sichuan, Jiangxi, Shandong, Jiangsu, Zhejiang, Hubei, Hunan, Fujian, Guangdong, Guangxi, Guizhou, Yunnan, Tibet).

== Subspecies ==
- Spilarctia bisecta bisecta (southern China)
- Spilarctia bisecta occidentalis (Rothschild, 1914) (China: Tibet)
