= Spilarctia coccinea =

Scientific classification
- Kingdom: Animalia
- Phylum: Arthropoda
- Class: Insecta
- Order: Lepidoptera
- Superfamily: Noctuoidea
- Family: Erebidae
- Subfamily: Arctiinae
- Genus: Spilarctia
- Species: S. coccinea

Binomial name
- Spilarctia coccinea (Hampson, 1907)

Synonyms
- Diacrisia coccinea Hampson, 1907; Spilosoma coccinea (Hampson, 1907)

Species of moth

Spilarctia coccinea is a moth in the family Erebidae. It was described by George Hampson in 1907. It is found in the Philippines.
