= Spilarctia yukikoae =

Scientific classification
- Domain: Eukaryota
- Kingdom: Animalia
- Phylum: Arthropoda
- Class: Insecta
- Order: Lepidoptera
- Superfamily: Noctuoidea
- Family: Erebidae
- Subfamily: Arctiinae
- Genus: Spilarctia
- Species: S. yukikoae

Binomial name
- Spilarctia yukikoae Kishida, 1995

Synonyms
- Spilosoma yukikoae (Kishida, 1995)

Species of moth

Spilarctia yukikoae is a moth in the family Erebidae. It was described by Yasunori Kishida in 1995. It is found in Nepal.
