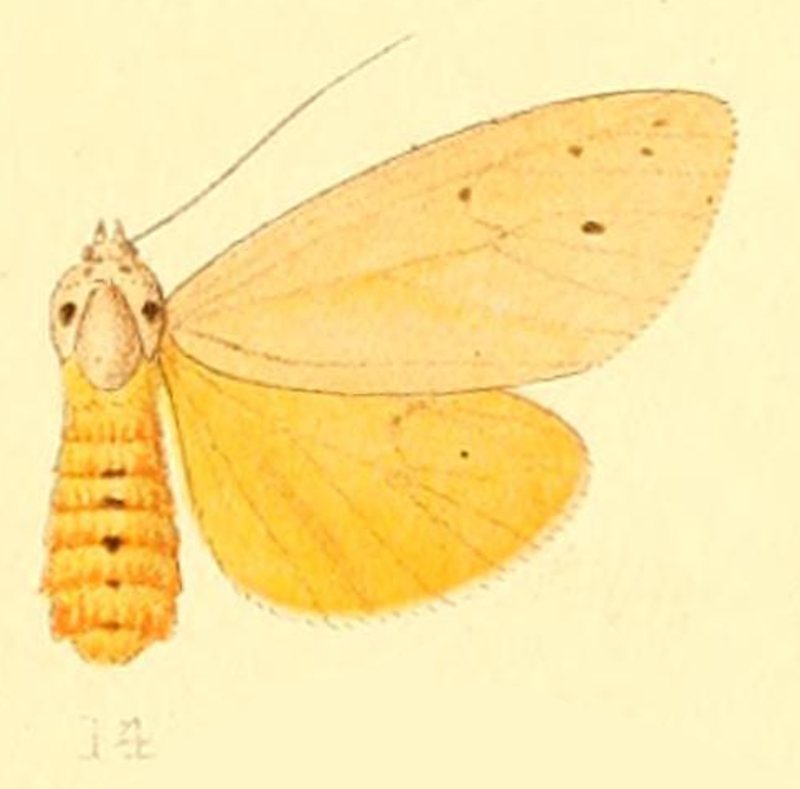
- Female

Scientific classification
- Kingdom: Animalia
- Phylum: Arthropoda
- Class: Insecta
- Order: Lepidoptera
- Superfamily: Noctuoidea
- Family: Erebidae
- Subfamily: Arctiinae
- Genus: Spilarctia
- Species: S. metaxantha

Binomial name
- Spilarctia metaxantha (Hampson, 1901)

Synonyms
- Diacrisia metaxantha Hampson, 1901; Spilosoma metaxantha (Hampson, 1901)

= Spilarctia metaxantha =

Species of moth

Spilarctia metaxantha is a moth in the family Erebidae. It was described by George Hampson in 1901. It is found in Myanmar.
