= Spilarctia transversa =

Scientific classification
- Domain: Eukaryota
- Kingdom: Animalia
- Phylum: Arthropoda
- Class: Insecta
- Order: Lepidoptera
- Superfamily: Noctuoidea
- Family: Erebidae
- Subfamily: Arctiinae
- Genus: Spilarctia
- Species: S. transversa

Binomial name
- Spilarctia transversa (De Vos & Suhartawan, 2011)

Synonyms
- Spilosoma transversa De Vos & Suhartawan, 2011

Species of moth

Spilarctia transversa is a moth in the family Erebidae. It was described by Rob de Vos and Daawia Suhartawan in 2011. It is found in Papua New Guinea and Papua, where it seems to be restricted to the Central Mountain Range.
