= Spilarctia rubescens =

Scientific classification
- Kingdom: Animalia
- Phylum: Arthropoda
- Class: Insecta
- Order: Lepidoptera
- Superfamily: Noctuoidea
- Family: Erebidae
- Subfamily: Arctiinae
- Genus: Spilarctia
- Species: S. rubescens

Binomial name
- Spilarctia rubescens (Walker, 1855)

Synonyms
- Spilosoma rubescens Walker, 1855

Species of moth

Spilarctia rubescens is a moth in the family Erebidae. It was described by Francis Walker in 1855. It is found in Myanmar, China (Yunnan) and on Sumatra.

== Subspecies ==
- Spilarctia rubescens rubescens
- Spilarctia rubescens sanggula Dubatolov, 2010 (western Sumatra)
