= Spilarctia phaea =

Scientific classification
- Kingdom: Animalia
- Phylum: Arthropoda
- Class: Insecta
- Order: Lepidoptera
- Superfamily: Noctuoidea
- Family: Erebidae
- Subfamily: Arctiinae
- Genus: Spilarctia
- Species: S. phaea

Binomial name
- Spilarctia phaea (Hampson, 1901)

Synonyms
- Diacrisia phaea Hampson, 1901; Spilosoma phaea (Hampson, 1901)

Species of moth

Spilarctia phaea is a moth in the family Erebidae. It was described by George Hampson in 1901. It is found on Bali in Indonesia.
