= Spilarctia nana =

Scientific classification
- Kingdom: Animalia
- Phylum: Arthropoda
- Class: Insecta
- Order: Lepidoptera
- Superfamily: Noctuoidea
- Family: Erebidae
- Subfamily: Arctiinae
- Genus: Spilarctia
- Species: S. nana

Binomial name
- Spilarctia nana (De Vos & Suhartawan, 2011)

Synonyms
- Spilosoma nana De Vos & Suhartawan, 2011

Species of moth

Spilarctia nana is a moth in the family Erebidae. It was described by Rob de Vos and Daawia Suhartawan in 2011. It is found in Papua and Papua New Guinea. The habitat consists of mountainous areas.
