= Spilarctia cervina =

Scientific classification
- Kingdom: Animalia
- Phylum: Arthropoda
- Class: Insecta
- Order: Lepidoptera
- Superfamily: Noctuoidea
- Family: Erebidae
- Subfamily: Arctiinae
- Genus: Spilarctia
- Species: S. cervina

Binomial name
- Spilarctia cervina (Wallengren, 1860)

Synonyms
- Chelonia cervina Wallengren, 1860; Diacrisia amilada Swinhoe, 1907

Species of moth

Spilarctia cervina is a moth in the family Erebidae. It was described by Hans Daniel Johan Wallengren in 1860. It is found on Sumatra and the Mentawai Islands of Indonesia.

== Subspecies ==
- Spilarctia cervina cervina (Sumatra)
- Spilarctia cervina pseudoamilada Dubatolov, 2010 (Indonesia: Mentawai Islands)
