= Spilarctia postbrunnea =

Scientific classification
- Domain: Eukaryota
- Kingdom: Animalia
- Phylum: Arthropoda
- Class: Insecta
- Order: Lepidoptera
- Superfamily: Noctuoidea
- Family: Erebidae
- Subfamily: Arctiinae
- Genus: Spilarctia
- Species: S. postbrunnea

Binomial name
- Spilarctia postbrunnea (De Vos & Suhartawan, 2011)

Synonyms
- Spilosoma postbrunnea De Vos & Suhartawan, 2011

Species of moth

Spilarctia postbrunnea is a moth in the family Erebidae. It was described by Rob de Vos and Daawia Suhartawan in 2011. It is found in New Guinea.
