= Spilarctia dinawa =

Scientific classification
- Domain: Eukaryota
- Kingdom: Animalia
- Phylum: Arthropoda
- Class: Insecta
- Order: Lepidoptera
- Superfamily: Noctuoidea
- Family: Erebidae
- Subfamily: Arctiinae
- Genus: Spilarctia
- Species: S. dinawa

Binomial name
- Spilarctia dinawa (Bethune-Baker, 1904)

Synonyms
- Diacrisia dinawa Bethune-Baker, 1904; Spilosoma dinawa (Bethune-Baker, 1904); Spilarctia dinava misspelling; Diacrisia ochrifrons Joicey & Talbot, 1917

Species of moth

Spilarctia dinawa is a moth in the family Erebidae. It was described by George Thomas Bethune-Baker in 1904. It is found in Papua and Papua New Guinea. The habitat consists of low and moderate altitudes.

Adults are variable. The forewings can vary in colour from pale yellowish brown to almost chocolate brown.
