= Spilarctia irregularis =

Scientific classification
- Domain: Eukaryota
- Kingdom: Animalia
- Phylum: Arthropoda
- Class: Insecta
- Order: Lepidoptera
- Superfamily: Noctuoidea
- Family: Erebidae
- Subfamily: Arctiinae
- Genus: Spilarctia
- Species: S. irregularis

Binomial name
- Spilarctia irregularis (Rothschild, 1910)

Synonyms
- Diacrisia irregularis Rothschild, 1910; Spilosoma irregularis (Rothschild, 1910)

Species of moth

Spilarctia irregularis is a moth in the family Erebidae. It was described by Walter Rothschild in 1910. It is found in the Chinese provinces of Hubei, Sichuan, Yunnan, Henan, Hunan and Shaanxi.
