= Spilarctia bipunctata =

Scientific classification
- Domain: Eukaryota
- Kingdom: Animalia
- Phylum: Arthropoda
- Class: Insecta
- Order: Lepidoptera
- Superfamily: Noctuoidea
- Family: Erebidae
- Subfamily: Arctiinae
- Genus: Spilarctia
- Species: S. bipunctata

Binomial name
- Spilarctia bipunctata Daniel, 1943

Synonyms
- Spilarctia comma bipunctata Daniel, 1943; Spilosoma bipunctata (Daniel, 1943)

Species of moth

Spilarctia bipunctata is a moth in the family Erebidae. It was described by Franz Daniel in 1943. It is found in Yunnan and Sichuan in China.
