= Spilarctia moorei =

Scientific classification
- Kingdom: Animalia
- Phylum: Arthropoda
- Class: Insecta
- Order: Lepidoptera
- Superfamily: Noctuoidea
- Family: Erebidae
- Subfamily: Arctiinae
- Genus: Spilarctia
- Species: S. moorei

Binomial name
- Spilarctia moorei Snellen, 1879

Synonyms
- Spilosoma sanguinalis Snellen, 1879 (preocc. Moore); Spilarctia snelleni Kirby, 1892

Species of moth

Spilarctia moorei is a moth in the family Erebidae. It was described by Snellen in 1879. It is found on Sulawesi.
