= Spilarctia bifasciata =

Scientific classification
- Domain: Eukaryota
- Kingdom: Animalia
- Phylum: Arthropoda
- Class: Insecta
- Order: Lepidoptera
- Superfamily: Noctuoidea
- Family: Erebidae
- Subfamily: Arctiinae
- Genus: Spilarctia
- Species: S. bifasciata

Binomial name
- Spilarctia bifasciata Butler, 1881

Synonyms
- Spilosoma bifasciata (Butler, 1881)

Species of moth

Spilarctia bifasciata is a moth in the family Erebidae. It was described by Arthur Gardiner Butler in 1881. It is found in Japan.
