= Spilarctia holobrunnea =

Scientific classification
- Domain: Eukaryota
- Kingdom: Animalia
- Phylum: Arthropoda
- Class: Insecta
- Order: Lepidoptera
- Superfamily: Noctuoidea
- Family: Erebidae
- Subfamily: Arctiinae
- Genus: Spilarctia
- Species: S. holobrunnea

Binomial name
- Spilarctia holobrunnea (Joicey & Talbot in Joicey, Noakes & Talbot, 1916)

Synonyms
- Diacrisia holobrunnea Joicey & Talbot in Joicey, Noakes & Talbot, 1916; Spilosoma holobrunnea (Joicey & Talbot in Joicey, Noakes & Talbot, 1916)

Species of moth

Spilarctia holobrunnea is a moth in the family Erebidae. It was described by James John Joicey and George Talbot in 1916. It is found on New Guinea, where it has been recorded from the Arfak Mountains in Papua. It is probably also present in Papua New Guinea.
