= Spilarctia mindanao =

Scientific classification
- Kingdom: Animalia
- Phylum: Arthropoda
- Clade: Pancrustacea
- Class: Insecta
- Order: Lepidoptera
- Superfamily: Noctuoidea
- Family: Erebidae
- Subfamily: Arctiinae
- Genus: Spilarctia
- Species: S. mindanao

Binomial name
- Spilarctia mindanao Dubatolov & Y. Kishida, 2010

Synonyms
- Spilosoma trikenzana Černý, 2011

Species of moth

Spilarctia mindanao is a moth in the family Erebidae. It was described by Vladimir Viktorovitch Dubatolov and Yasunori Kishida in 2010. It is found on Mindanao in the Philippines.
