= Spilarctia tigrina =

Scientific classification
- Domain: Eukaryota
- Kingdom: Animalia
- Phylum: Arthropoda
- Class: Insecta
- Order: Lepidoptera
- Superfamily: Noctuoidea
- Family: Erebidae
- Subfamily: Arctiinae
- Genus: Spilarctia
- Species: S. tigrina

Binomial name
- Spilarctia tigrina (Moore, 1879)

Synonyms
- Rhyparia tigrina Moore, 1879; Spilosoma tigrina (Moore, 1879)

Species of moth

Spilarctia tigrina is a moth in the family Erebidae. It was described by Frederic Moore in 1879. It is found in southern India.
