= Spilarctia arctichroa =

Scientific classification
- Domain: Eukaryota
- Kingdom: Animalia
- Phylum: Arthropoda
- Class: Insecta
- Order: Lepidoptera
- Superfamily: Noctuoidea
- Family: Erebidae
- Subfamily: Arctiinae
- Genus: Spilarctia
- Species: S. arctichroa

Binomial name
- Spilarctia arctichroa (H. Druce, 1909)

Synonyms
- Diacrisia arctichroa H. Druce, 1909; Spilosoma arctichroa (H. Druce, 1909)

Species of moth

Spilarctia arctichroa is a moth in the family Erebidae. It was described by Herbert Druce in 1909. It is found in Papua and north-western Papua New Guinea. The habitat consists of lowland and mountainous areas.
