= Spilarctia xanthosoma =

Scientific classification
- Domain: Eukaryota
- Kingdom: Animalia
- Phylum: Arthropoda
- Class: Insecta
- Order: Lepidoptera
- Superfamily: Noctuoidea
- Family: Erebidae
- Subfamily: Arctiinae
- Genus: Spilarctia
- Species: S. xanthosoma

Binomial name
- Spilarctia xanthosoma (Roepke, 1954)

Synonyms
- Spilosoma xanthosoma Roepke, 1954

Species of moth

Spilarctia xanthosoma is a moth in the family Erebidae. It was described by Walter Karl Johann Roepke in 1954. It is found on Java.
