= Spilarctia albicornis =

Scientific classification
- Kingdom: Animalia
- Phylum: Arthropoda
- Class: Insecta
- Order: Lepidoptera
- Superfamily: Noctuoidea
- Family: Erebidae
- Subfamily: Arctiinae
- Genus: Spilarctia
- Species: S. albicornis

Binomial name
- Spilarctia albicornis (Hampson, 1900)

Synonyms
- Spilosoma albicornis Hampson, 1900

Species of moth

Spilarctia albicornis is a moth in the family Erebidae. It was described by George Hampson in 1900. It is found in Sri Lanka.
