= Spilarctia brunnea =

Scientific classification
- Kingdom: Animalia
- Phylum: Arthropoda
- Clade: Pancrustacea
- Class: Insecta
- Order: Lepidoptera
- Superfamily: Noctuoidea
- Family: Erebidae
- Subfamily: Arctiinae
- Genus: Spilarctia
- Species: S. brunnea

Binomial name
- Spilarctia brunnea (Heylaerts, 1890)

Synonyms
- Arctia brunnea Heylaerts, 1890; Spilosoma brunnea (Heylaerts, 1890); Spilarctia heylaertsii Kirby, 1892

Species of moth

Spilarctia brunnea is a moth in the family Erebidae. It was described by Franciscus J. M. Heylaerts in 1890. It is found on Sumatra.
