= Spilarctia borneensis =

Scientific classification
- Domain: Eukaryota
- Kingdom: Animalia
- Phylum: Arthropoda
- Class: Insecta
- Order: Lepidoptera
- Superfamily: Noctuoidea
- Family: Erebidae
- Subfamily: Arctiinae
- Genus: Spilarctia
- Species: S. borneensis

Binomial name
- Spilarctia borneensis (Rothschild, 1910)

Synonyms
- Diacrisia semperi borneensis Rothschild, 1910

Species of moth

Spilarctia borneensis is a moth in the family Erebidae. It was described by Walter Rothschild in 1910. It is found on Borneo.
