= Spilarctia nydia =

Scientific classification
- Domain: Eukaryota
- Kingdom: Animalia
- Phylum: Arthropoda
- Class: Insecta
- Order: Lepidoptera
- Superfamily: Noctuoidea
- Family: Erebidae
- Subfamily: Arctiinae
- Genus: Spilarctia
- Species: S. nydia

Binomial name
- Spilarctia nydia Butler, 1875

Synonyms
- Spilosoma nydia; Spilarctia tienmushanica Daniel, 1943; Spilosoma tienmushanica; Spilarctia tienmushanica werneri Kishida, 1991; Spilosoma tienmushanica werneri

Species of moth

Spilarctia nydia is a moth in the family Erebidae. It was described by Arthur Gardiner Butler in 1875. It is found in Nepal, China (Zhejiang, Jiangsu, Jiangxi, Fujian, Guangdong, Yunnan), Taiwan and northern Vietnam.

== Subspecies ==
- Spilarctia nydia nydia (Nepal)
- Spilarctia nydia tienmushanica Daniel, 1943 (China: Zhejiang, Jiangsu, Jiangxi, Fujian, Guangdong, Yunnan)
- Spilarctia nydia werneri Kishida, 1991 (Taiwan)
