= Spilarctia todara =

Scientific classification
- Domain: Eukaryota
- Kingdom: Animalia
- Phylum: Arthropoda
- Class: Insecta
- Order: Lepidoptera
- Superfamily: Noctuoidea
- Family: Erebidae
- Subfamily: Arctiinae
- Genus: Spilarctia
- Species: S. todara

Binomial name
- Spilarctia todara (Moore, 1872)

Synonyms
- Spilosoma todara Moore, 1872; Diacrisia hampsoni Rothschild, 1914

Species of moth

Spilarctia todara is a moth of the family Erebidae. It was described by Frederic Moore in 1872. It is found in eastern India.
