= Spilarctia biagi =

Scientific classification
- Domain: Eukaryota
- Kingdom: Animalia
- Phylum: Arthropoda
- Class: Insecta
- Order: Lepidoptera
- Superfamily: Noctuoidea
- Family: Erebidae
- Subfamily: Arctiinae
- Genus: Spilarctia
- Species: S. biagi

Binomial name
- Spilarctia biagi (Bethune-Baker, 1908)

Synonyms
- Diacrisia biagi Bethune-Baker, 1908; Spilosoma biagi; Diacrisia biagi elongata Rothschild, 1914; Diacrisia biagi angiana Joicey & Talbot in Joicey, Noakes & Talbot, 1916; Diacrisia nigricorna Joicey & Talbot, 1916

Species of moth

Spilarctia biagi is a moth of the family Erebidae. It was described by George Thomas Bethune-Baker in 1908. It is found in New Guinea.
