= Spilarctia accensa =

Scientific classification
- Domain: Eukaryota
- Kingdom: Animalia
- Phylum: Arthropoda
- Class: Insecta
- Order: Lepidoptera
- Superfamily: Noctuoidea
- Family: Erebidae
- Subfamily: Arctiinae
- Genus: Spilarctia
- Species: S. accensa

Binomial name
- Spilarctia accensa (C. Swinhoe, 1903)

Synonyms
- Pericallia accensa C. Swinhoe, 1903

Species of moth

Spilarctia accensa is a moth in the family Erebidae. It was described by Charles Swinhoe in 1903. It is found on Sumatra on Malacca.
