= Spilarctia cadioui =

Scientific classification
- Domain: Eukaryota
- Kingdom: Animalia
- Phylum: Arthropoda
- Class: Insecta
- Order: Lepidoptera
- Superfamily: Noctuoidea
- Family: Erebidae
- Subfamily: Arctiinae
- Genus: Spilarctia
- Species: S. cadioui

Binomial name
- Spilarctia cadioui Thomas, 1989

Synonyms
- Spilosoma cadioui (Thomas, 1989)

Species of moth

Spilarctia cadioui is a moth in the family Erebidae. It was described by Thomas in 1989. It is found on Sulawesi in Indonesia.
