= Spilarctia novaeguineae =

Scientific classification
- Kingdom: Animalia
- Phylum: Arthropoda
- Class: Insecta
- Order: Lepidoptera
- Superfamily: Noctuoidea
- Family: Erebidae
- Subfamily: Arctiinae
- Genus: Spilarctia
- Species: S. novaeguineae

Binomial name
- Spilarctia novaeguineae (Rothschild, 1913)

Synonyms
- Ardices novaeguineae Rothschild, 1913; Spilosoma novaeguineae (Rothschild, 1913)

Species of moth

Spilarctia novaeguineae is a moth in the family Erebidae. It was described by Walter Rothschild in 1913. It is found in Papua New Guinea.
