= Spilarctia strigatula =

Scientific classification
- Kingdom: Animalia
- Phylum: Arthropoda
- Class: Insecta
- Order: Lepidoptera
- Superfamily: Noctuoidea
- Family: Erebidae
- Subfamily: Arctiinae
- Genus: Spilarctia
- Species: S. strigatula

Binomial name
- Spilarctia strigatula (Walker, 1855)

Synonyms
- Arctia strigatula Walker, 1855; Spilosoma strigatula

Species of moth

Spilarctia strigatula is a moth in the family Erebidae. It was described by Francis Walker in 1855. It is found in Sundaland, Thailand, Nepal and Myanmar.

The larvae feed on Dioscorea, Alternanthera, Commelina, Gerbera, Ipomoea, Musa, Paspalum, Sesbania and Vanda species.

== Subspecies ==
- Spilarctia strigatula strigatula
- Spilarctia strigatula bali Dubatolov & Kishida, 2010 (Bali)
