= Spilarctia ardens =

Scientific classification
- Domain: Eukaryota
- Kingdom: Animalia
- Phylum: Arthropoda
- Class: Insecta
- Order: Lepidoptera
- Superfamily: Noctuoidea
- Family: Erebidae
- Subfamily: Arctiinae
- Genus: Spilarctia
- Species: S. ardens

Binomial name
- Spilarctia ardens (Kishida, 1987)

Synonyms
- Spilosoma ardens Kishida, 1987

Species of moth

Spilarctia ardens is a moth in the family Erebidae. It was described by Yasunori Kishida in 1987. It is found on Luzon in the Philippines.
