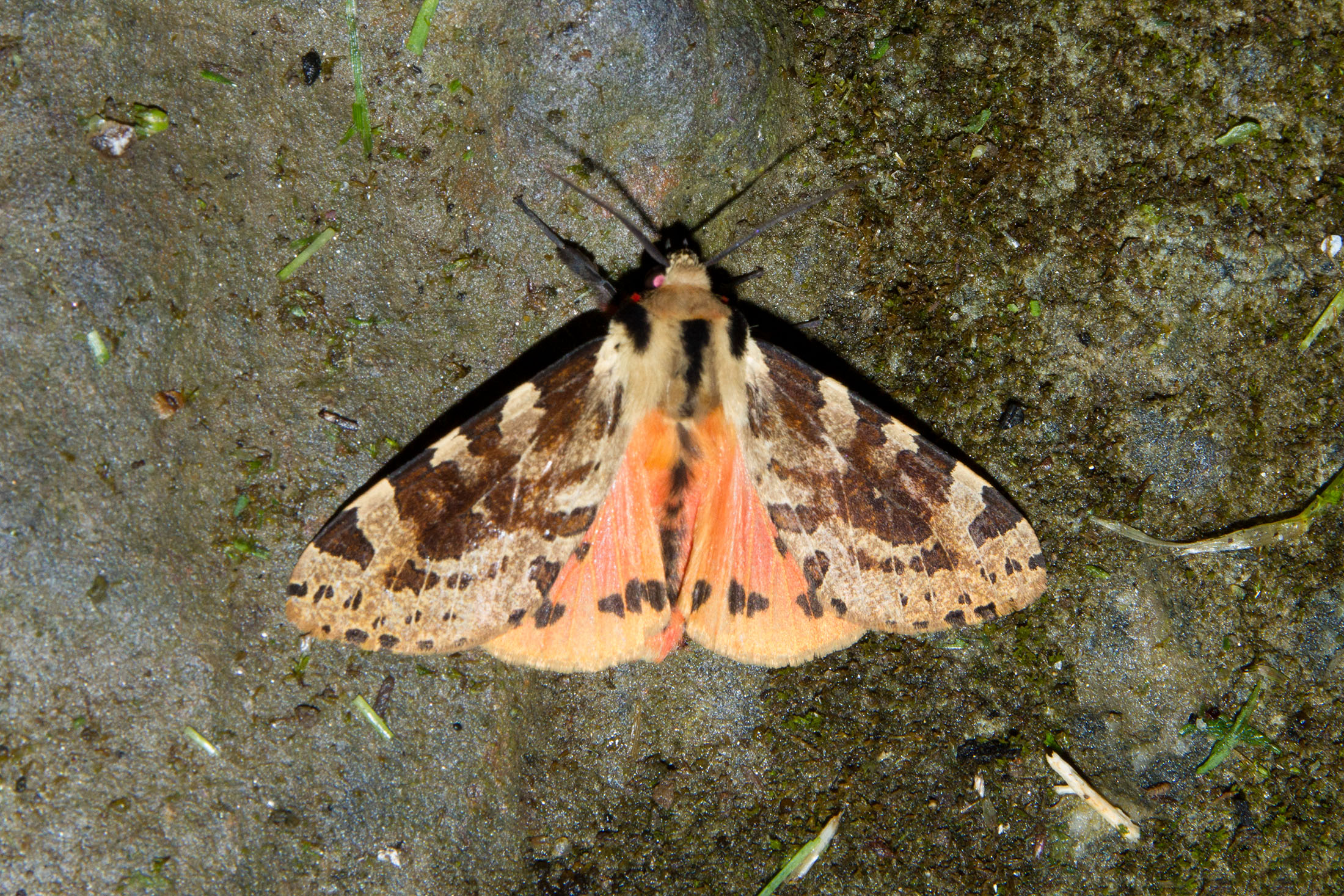

Scientific classification
- Kingdom: Animalia
- Phylum: Arthropoda
- Class: Insecta
- Order: Lepidoptera
- Superfamily: Noctuoidea
- Family: Erebidae
- Subfamily: Arctiinae
- Genus: Spilarctia
- Species: S. kebea

Binomial name
- Spilarctia kebea (Bethune-Baker, 1904)

Synonyms
- Diacrisia kebea Bethune-Baker, 1904; Spilosoma kebea (Bethune-Baker, 1904)

= Spilarctia kebea =

Species of moth

Spilarctia kebea is a moth in the family Erebidae. It was described by George Thomas Bethune-Baker in 1904. It is found in New Guinea, where it has been recorded from Papua and Papua New Guinea.
