= Spilarctia persimilis =

Scientific classification
- Domain: Eukaryota
- Kingdom: Animalia
- Phylum: Arthropoda
- Class: Insecta
- Order: Lepidoptera
- Superfamily: Noctuoidea
- Family: Erebidae
- Subfamily: Arctiinae
- Genus: Spilarctia
- Species: S. persimilis

Binomial name
- Spilarctia persimilis (Rothschild, 1914)

Synonyms
- Diacrisia persimilis Rothschild, 1914; Spilosoma persimilis

Species of moth

Spilarctia persimilis is a moth in the family Erebidae. It was described by Walter Rothschild in 1914. It is found in Papua, Indonesia, where it is restricted to the Central Mountain Range.
