= Spilarctia variata =

Scientific classification
- Domain: Eukaryota
- Kingdom: Animalia
- Phylum: Arthropoda
- Class: Insecta
- Order: Lepidoptera
- Superfamily: Noctuoidea
- Family: Erebidae
- Subfamily: Arctiinae
- Genus: Spilarctia
- Species: S. variata

Binomial name
- Spilarctia variata Daniel, 1943

Synonyms
- Spilarctia obliqua variata Daniel, 1943; Spilarctia casigneta sinica tsinlingi Daniel, 1943; Spilarctia obliqua pseudohampsoni Daniel, 1943

Species of moth

Spilarctia variata is a moth in the family Erebidae. It was described by Franz Daniel in 1943. It is found in China (Jiangsu, Zhejiang, Fujian, Guangdong, Sichuan, Yunnan, Guangxi, Shaanxi, Jiangxi, Tibet).

== Subspecies ==
- Spilarctia variata variata
- Spilarctia variata pseudohampsoni Daniel, 1943
