= Spilarctia vandepolli =

Scientific classification
- Kingdom: Animalia
- Phylum: Arthropoda
- Class: Insecta
- Order: Lepidoptera
- Superfamily: Noctuoidea
- Family: Erebidae
- Subfamily: Arctiinae
- Genus: Spilarctia
- Species: S. vandepolli

Binomial name
- Spilarctia vandepolli (Rothschild, 1910)

Synonyms
- Diacrisia vandepolli Rothschild, 1910; Spilosoma vandepolli (Rothschild, 1910); Diacrisia fuscitincta sensu Snellen, 1905

Species of moth

Spilarctia vandepolli is a moth in the family Erebidae. It was described by Walter Rothschild in 1910. It is found in Sundaland. The habitat consists of lowland rain forests.

Adults are sexually dimorphic. The forewings are brownish and the hindwings are bright yellow. The hindwings are darker in males.
