= Spilarctia wildi =

Scientific classification
- Kingdom: Animalia
- Phylum: Arthropoda
- Clade: Pancrustacea
- Class: Insecta
- Order: Lepidoptera
- Superfamily: Noctuoidea
- Family: Erebidae
- Subfamily: Arctiinae
- Genus: Spilarctia
- Species: S. wildi

Binomial name
- Spilarctia wildi (De Vos, 2013)

Synonyms
- Spilosoma wildi De Vos, 2013

Species of moth

Spilarctia wildi, or Spilosoma wildi is a moth in the family Erebidae. It was described by Rob de Vos in 2013. It is found in Papua, Indonesia.
