= Spilarctia ruficosta =

Scientific classification
- Domain: Eukaryota
- Kingdom: Animalia
- Phylum: Arthropoda
- Class: Insecta
- Order: Lepidoptera
- Superfamily: Noctuoidea
- Family: Erebidae
- Subfamily: Arctiinae
- Genus: Spilarctia
- Species: S. ruficosta

Binomial name
- Spilarctia ruficosta (Joicey & Talbot in Joicey, Noakes & Talbot, 1916)

Synonyms
- Diacrisia ruficosta Joicey & Talbot in Joicey, Noakes & Talbot, 1916; Spilosoma ruficosta (Joicey & Talbot in Joicey, Noakes & Talbot, 1916)

Species of moth

Spilarctia ruficosta is a moth in the family Erebidae. It was described by James John Joicey and George Talbot in 1916. It is found on New Guinea. It is endemic to the Arfak Mountains in Papua.
