= Spilarctia lungtani =

Scientific classification
- Domain: Eukaryota
- Kingdom: Animalia
- Phylum: Arthropoda
- Class: Insecta
- Order: Lepidoptera
- Superfamily: Noctuoidea
- Family: Erebidae
- Subfamily: Arctiinae
- Genus: Spilarctia
- Species: S. lungtani

Binomial name
- Spilarctia lungtani Daniel, 1943

Species of moth

Spilarctia lungtani is a moth in the family Erebidae. It was described by Franz Daniel in 1943. It is found in China (Shanghai, Jiangsu, Zhejiang, Hunan, Fujian, Sichuan, Anhui, Hubei, Guangxi).
