= Spilarctia dohertyi =

Scientific classification
- Domain: Eukaryota
- Kingdom: Animalia
- Phylum: Arthropoda
- Class: Insecta
- Order: Lepidoptera
- Superfamily: Noctuoidea
- Family: Erebidae
- Subfamily: Arctiinae
- Genus: Spilarctia
- Species: S. dohertyi

Binomial name
- Spilarctia dohertyi (Rothschild, 1910)

Synonyms
- Diacrisia dohertyi Rothschild, 1910; Spilosoma dohertyi (Rothschild, 1910)

Species of moth

Spilarctia dohertyi is a moth in the family Erebidae. It was described by Walter Rothschild in 1910. It is found on Sulawesi in Indonesia.
