= Spilarctia philippina =

Scientific classification
- Kingdom: Animalia
- Phylum: Arthropoda
- Clade: Pancrustacea
- Class: Insecta
- Order: Lepidoptera
- Superfamily: Noctuoidea
- Family: Erebidae
- Subfamily: Arctiinae
- Genus: Spilarctia
- Species: S. philippina

Binomial name
- Spilarctia philippina Dubatolov & Kishida, 2006

Species of moth

Spilarctia philippina is a moth in the family Erebidae. It was described by Vladimir Viktorovitch Dubatolov and Yasunori Kishida in 2006. It is found in the Philippines.

== Subspecies ==
- Spilarctia philippina philippina (Philippines: Negros)
- Spilarctia philippina mindanaoica Dubatolov & Kishida, 2006 (Philippines: Mindanao, Leyte, Samar)
