= Spilarctia groganae =

Scientific classification
- Kingdom: Animalia
- Phylum: Arthropoda
- Clade: Pancrustacea
- Class: Insecta
- Order: Lepidoptera
- Superfamily: Noctuoidea
- Family: Erebidae
- Subfamily: Arctiinae
- Genus: Spilarctia
- Species: S. groganae

Binomial name
- Spilarctia groganae (Holloway, 1976)

Synonyms
- Spilosoma groganae Holloway, 1976

Species of moth

Spilarctia groganae is a moth in the family Erebidae. It was described by Jeremy Daniel Holloway in 1976. It is found on Borneo. The habitat consists of lower and upper montane forests.
