= Spilarctia javana =

Scientific classification
- Domain: Eukaryota
- Kingdom: Animalia
- Phylum: Arthropoda
- Class: Insecta
- Order: Lepidoptera
- Superfamily: Noctuoidea
- Family: Erebidae
- Subfamily: Arctiinae
- Genus: Spilarctia
- Species: S. javana

Binomial name
- Spilarctia javana (Rothschild, 1910)

Synonyms
- Diacrisia javana Rothschild, 1910; Spilosoma javana; Spilarctia javanum; Diacrisia procera Rothschild, 1910 (nomen nudum); Diacrisia procera Swinh.; Rothschild, 1914

Species of moth

Spilarctia javana is a moth of the family Erebidae. It was described by Walter Rothschild in 1910. It is found on Java.
