= Spilarctia castanea =

Scientific classification
- Kingdom: Animalia
- Phylum: Arthropoda
- Class: Insecta
- Order: Lepidoptera
- Superfamily: Noctuoidea
- Family: Erebidae
- Subfamily: Arctiinae
- Genus: Spilarctia
- Species: S. castanea

Binomial name
- Spilarctia castanea (Hampson, 1893)

Synonyms
- Spilosoma castanea Hampson, 1893

Species of moth

Spilarctia castanea is a moth in the family Erebidae. It was described by George Hampson in 1893. It is found in Sri Lanka.

== Description ==
The wingspan of the male is about 40 mm and about 50 mm in the female. Abdomen crimson in both sexes. Male has short branched antennae. In the male, the head and thorax are brownish. Basal joint of palpi, femur and pectus are crimson. Abdomen crimson above and below. The dorsal and lateral series of spots are small. Forewings brown with basal spot, antemedial series, spot at end of cell and those on costa above it well developed. The post-medial series is large and extremely irregular blotched. Cilia black. Hindwing is uniform in color.

In the female, the head and forewings are reddish brown. The forewings have a black spot at their base. A pair of ante-medial spots is found on each side of vein 1. The post-medial curved series runs from vein 4 to inner margin. Cilia reddish brown. Hindwings are crimson with a black spot at end of cell and submarginal series of large spots.
