= Spilarctia ummera =

Scientific classification
- Domain: Eukaryota
- Kingdom: Animalia
- Phylum: Arthropoda
- Class: Insecta
- Order: Lepidoptera
- Superfamily: Noctuoidea
- Family: Erebidae
- Subfamily: Arctiinae
- Genus: Spilarctia
- Species: S. ummera

Binomial name
- Spilarctia ummera Swinhoe, [1890]

Synonyms
- Spilosoma ummera (Swinhoe, [1890])

Species of moth

Spilarctia ummera is a moth in the family Erebidae. It was described by Charles Swinhoe in 1890. It is found in Myanmar.
