= Spilarctia baltazarae =

Scientific classification
- Domain: Eukaryota
- Kingdom: Animalia
- Phylum: Arthropoda
- Class: Insecta
- Order: Lepidoptera
- Superfamily: Noctuoidea
- Family: Erebidae
- Subfamily: Arctiinae
- Genus: Spilarctia
- Species: S. baltazarae

Binomial name
- Spilarctia baltazarae (Černý, 1995)

Synonyms
- Spilosoma baltazarae Černý, 1995

Species of moth

Spilarctia baltazarae is a moth in the family Erebidae. It was described by Karel Černý in 1995. It is found in the Philippines.
