= Spilarctia procedra =

Scientific classification
- Domain: Eukaryota
- Kingdom: Animalia
- Phylum: Arthropoda
- Class: Insecta
- Order: Lepidoptera
- Superfamily: Noctuoidea
- Family: Erebidae
- Subfamily: Arctiinae
- Genus: Spilarctia
- Species: S. procedra

Binomial name
- Spilarctia procedra (C. Swinhoe, 1907)

Synonyms
- Diacrisia procedra C. Swinhoe, 1907; Spilosoma procedra (C. Swinhoe, 1907)

Species of moth

Spilarctia procedra is a moth in the family Erebidae. It was described by Charles Swinhoe in 1907. It is found on Sumatra in Indonesia.
