= Spilarctia dukouensis =

Scientific classification
- Kingdom: Animalia
- Phylum: Arthropoda
- Clade: Pancrustacea
- Class: Insecta
- Order: Lepidoptera
- Superfamily: Noctuoidea
- Family: Erebidae
- Subfamily: Arctiinae
- Genus: Spilarctia
- Species: S. dukouensis

Binomial name
- Spilarctia dukouensis C.-L. Fang, 1982

Species of moth

Spilarctia dukouensis is a moth in the family Erebidae. It was described by Cheng-Lai Fang in 1982. It is found in the Chinese provinces of Sichuan and Yunnan.
