= Spilarctia enarotali =

Scientific classification
- Domain: Eukaryota
- Kingdom: Animalia
- Phylum: Arthropoda
- Class: Insecta
- Order: Lepidoptera
- Superfamily: Noctuoidea
- Family: Erebidae
- Subfamily: Arctiinae
- Genus: Spilarctia
- Species: S. enarotali

Binomial name
- Spilarctia enarotali (De Vos & Suhartawan, 2011)

Synonyms
- Spilosoma enarotali De Vos & Suhartawan, 2011

Species of moth

Spilarctia enarotali is a moth in the family Erebidae. It was described by Rob de Vos and Daawia Suhartawan in 2011. It is found in Papua, Indonesia, where it seems to be restricted to the Paniai area.
