= Spilarctia gurkoi =

Scientific classification
- Kingdom: Animalia
- Phylum: Arthropoda
- Clade: Pancrustacea
- Class: Insecta
- Order: Lepidoptera
- Superfamily: Noctuoidea
- Family: Erebidae
- Subfamily: Arctiinae
- Genus: Spilarctia
- Species: S. gurkoi

Binomial name
- Spilarctia gurkoi Dubatolov & Y. Kishida, 2010

Species of moth

Spilarctia gurkoi is a moth in the family Erebidae. It was described by Vladimir Viktorovitch Dubatolov and Yasunori Kishida in 2010. It is found in the Mentawai Islands of Indonesia.
