= Spilarctia philippinica =

Scientific classification
- Kingdom: Animalia
- Phylum: Arthropoda
- Clade: Pancrustacea
- Class: Insecta
- Order: Lepidoptera
- Superfamily: Noctuoidea
- Family: Erebidae
- Subfamily: Arctiinae
- Genus: Spilarctia
- Species: S. philippinica

Binomial name
- Spilarctia philippinica Dubatolov & Y. Kishida, 2010

Species of moth

Spilarctia philippinica is a moth in the family Erebidae. It was described by Vladimir Viktorovitch Dubatolov and Yasunori Kishida in 2010. It is found on Luzon and Negros in the Philippines.

== Subspecies ==
- Spilarctia philippinica philippinica (Philippines: Luzon)
- Spilarctia philippinica negrosica Dubatolov & Kishida, 2010 (Philippines: Negros)
