= Spilarctia costata =

Scientific classification
- Domain: Eukaryota
- Kingdom: Animalia
- Phylum: Arthropoda
- Class: Insecta
- Order: Lepidoptera
- Superfamily: Noctuoidea
- Family: Erebidae
- Subfamily: Arctiinae
- Genus: Spilarctia
- Species: S. costata

Binomial name
- Spilarctia costata (Boisduval, 1832)

Synonyms
- Chelonia costata Boisduval, 1832; Spilosoma costata; Diacrisia costata vivida Rothschild, 1910; Spilosoma costata vivida

Species of moth

Spilarctia costata is a moth in the family Erebidae. It was described by Jean Baptiste Boisduval in 1832. It is found in Papua, Papua New Guinea and on the Bismarck Archipelago.
