= Spilarctia gopara =

Scientific classification
- Domain: Eukaryota
- Kingdom: Animalia
- Phylum: Arthropoda
- Class: Insecta
- Order: Lepidoptera
- Superfamily: Noctuoidea
- Family: Erebidae
- Subfamily: Arctiinae
- Genus: Spilarctia
- Species: S. gopara

Binomial name
- Spilarctia gopara (Moore, [1860])

Synonyms
- Spilosoma gopara Moore, [1860]; Diacrisia gopara

Species of moth

Spilarctia gopara is a moth in the family Erebidae. It was described by Frederic Moore in 1860. It is found in the Indian states of Sikkim and Assam and in Nepal.
