= Spilarctia hosei =

Scientific classification
- Domain: Eukaryota
- Kingdom: Animalia
- Phylum: Arthropoda
- Class: Insecta
- Order: Lepidoptera
- Superfamily: Noctuoidea
- Family: Erebidae
- Subfamily: Arctiinae
- Genus: Spilarctia
- Species: S. hosei

Binomial name
- Spilarctia hosei (Rothschild, 1910)

Synonyms
- Diacrisia hosei Rothschild, 1910; Spilosoma hosei (Rothschild, 1910)

Species of moth

Spilarctia hosei is a moth in the family Erebidae. It was described by Walter Rothschild in 1910. It is found on Borneo. The habitat consists of lowland forests.
