= Spilarctia aurocostata =

Scientific classification
- Domain: Eukaryota
- Kingdom: Animalia
- Phylum: Arthropoda
- Class: Insecta
- Order: Lepidoptera
- Superfamily: Noctuoidea
- Family: Erebidae
- Subfamily: Arctiinae
- Genus: Spilarctia
- Species: S. aurocostata

Binomial name
- Spilarctia aurocostata (Oberthür, 1911)

Synonyms
- Diacrisia aurocostata Oberthür, 1911; Spilosoma aurocostata (Oberthür, 1911)

Species of moth

Spilarctia aurocostata is a moth in the family Erebidae. It was described by Charles Oberthür in 1911. It is found in China in Sichuan, Yunnan, Shaanxi and eastern Tibet.
