= Spilarctia victorina =

Scientific classification
- Domain: Eukaryota
- Kingdom: Animalia
- Phylum: Arthropoda
- Class: Insecta
- Order: Lepidoptera
- Superfamily: Noctuoidea
- Family: Erebidae
- Subfamily: Arctiinae
- Genus: Spilarctia
- Species: S. victorina

Binomial name
- Spilarctia victorina (Černý, 2011)

Synonyms
- Spilosoma victorina Černý, 2011

Species of moth

Spilarctia victorina is a moth in the family Erebidae. It was described by Karel Černý in 2011. It is found in the Philippines.
