= Spilarctia hypogopa =

Scientific classification
- Kingdom: Animalia
- Phylum: Arthropoda
- Class: Insecta
- Order: Lepidoptera
- Superfamily: Noctuoidea
- Family: Erebidae
- Subfamily: Arctiinae
- Genus: Spilarctia
- Species: S. hypogopa

Binomial name
- Spilarctia hypogopa (Hampson, 1907)

Synonyms
- Diacrisia hypogopa Hampson, 1907; Spilosoma hypogopa

Species of moth

Spilarctia hypogopa is a moth in the family Erebidae. It was described by George Hampson in 1907. It is found on Peninsular Malaysia, Sumatra and Borneo. The habitat consists of lowland forests and secondary vegetation.
