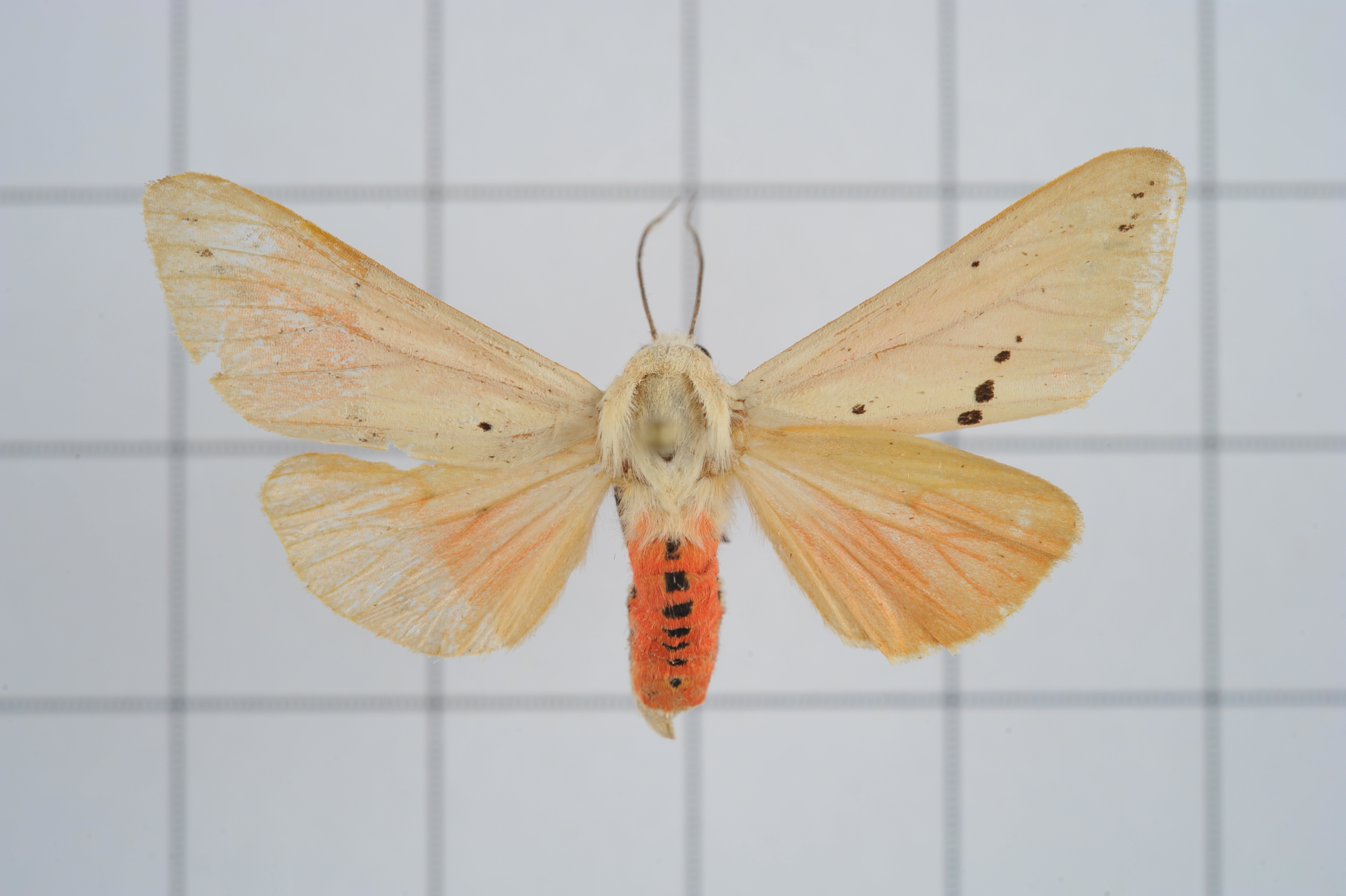

Scientific classification
- Kingdom: Animalia
- Phylum: Arthropoda
- Clade: Pancrustacea
- Class: Insecta
- Order: Lepidoptera
- Superfamily: Noctuoidea
- Family: Erebidae
- Subfamily: Arctiinae
- Genus: Spilarctia
- Species: S. subcarnea

Binomial name
- Spilarctia subcarnea (Walker, 1855)

Synonyms
- Spilosoma subcarnea Walker, 1855; Aloa bifrons Walker, 1855; Aloa leucothorax C. & R. Felder, 1862; Spilosoma erubescens Moore, 1877; Spilosoma rybakowi Alphéraky, 1897; Diacrisia robustum tsingtauana Rothschild, 1910; Diacrisia shakojiana Matsumura, 1927; Spilarctia subcarnea charbyni Daniel, 1943

= Spilarctia subcarnea =

Species of moth

Spilarctia subcarnea is a moth in the family Erebidae. It was described by Francis Walker in 1855. It is found in Nepal, China (Hong Kong, Zhejiang, Shanghai, Hubei, Sichuan, Beijing, Shandong Heilongjiang, Shaanxi, Jiangsu, Hunan, Fujian, Yunnan, Jilin, Guangdong, Dunbei, Nei Mongol, Guizhou, Gansu, Henan, Liaonin, Hebei, Shanxi, Anhui, Jiangxi, Guangxi), the Russian Far East, Korea, Japan and Taiwan.
