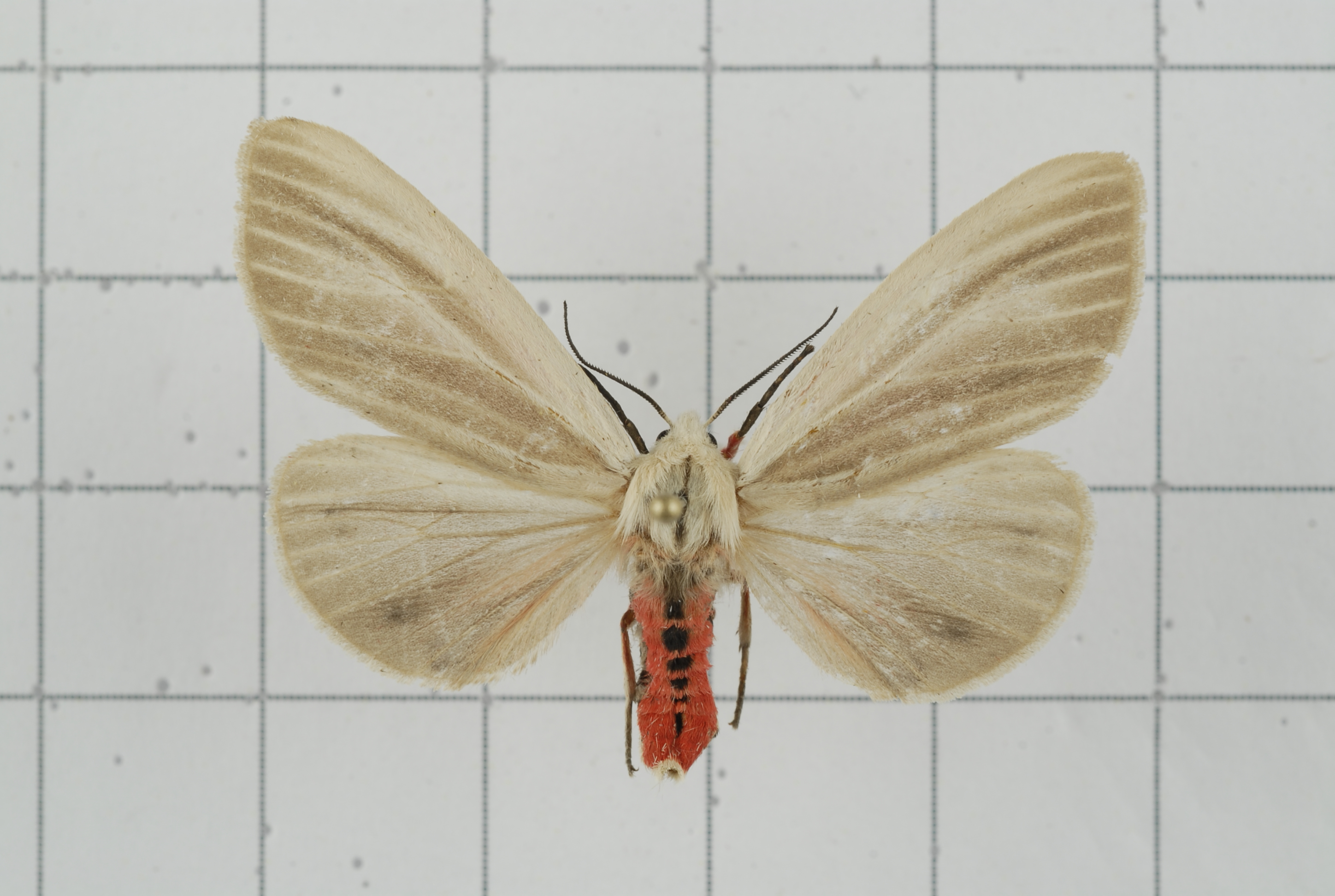

Scientific classification
- Domain: Eukaryota
- Kingdom: Animalia
- Phylum: Arthropoda
- Class: Insecta
- Order: Lepidoptera
- Superfamily: Noctuoidea
- Family: Erebidae
- Subfamily: Arctiinae
- Genus: Spilarctia
- Species: S. contaminata

Binomial name
- Spilarctia contaminata (Wileman, 1910)

Synonyms
- Aloa contaminata Wileman, 1910; Spilosoma contaminata (Wileman, 1910)

= Spilarctia contaminata =

Species of moth

Spilarctia contaminata is a moth in the family Erebidae. It was described by Alfred Ernest Wileman in 1910. It is found in Taiwan.
