= Spilarctia melanostigma =

Scientific classification
- Kingdom: Animalia
- Phylum: Arthropoda
- Class: Insecta
- Order: Lepidoptera
- Superfamily: Noctuoidea
- Family: Erebidae
- Subfamily: Arctiinae
- Genus: Spilarctia
- Species: S. melanostigma

Binomial name
- Spilarctia melanostigma (Erschoff, 1872)

Synonyms
- Spilosoma melanostigma Erschoff, 1872; Alphaea melanostigma; Spilarctia karakorumica Daniel, 1961

Species of moth

Spilarctia melanostigma is a moth in the family Erebidae. It was described by Nikolay Grigoryevich Erschoff in 1872. It is found in Uzbekistan, Kyrgyzstan, Hissar, Pamirs, Afghanistan, Pakistan and from the Himalayas to Sikkim and Assam.
