= Spilarctia bifascia =

Scientific classification
- Kingdom: Animalia
- Phylum: Arthropoda
- Class: Insecta
- Order: Lepidoptera
- Superfamily: Noctuoidea
- Family: Erebidae
- Subfamily: Arctiinae
- Genus: Spilarctia
- Species: S. bifascia

Binomial name
- Spilarctia bifascia Hampson, 1891

Synonyms
- Spilosoma bifascia (Hampson, 1891)

Species of moth

Spilarctia bifascia is a moth in the family Erebidae. It was described by George Hampson in 1891. It is found in the Nilgiris District of India.
