= Spilarctia leopardina =

Scientific classification
- Domain: Eukaryota
- Kingdom: Animalia
- Phylum: Arthropoda
- Class: Insecta
- Order: Lepidoptera
- Superfamily: Noctuoidea
- Family: Erebidae
- Subfamily: Arctiinae
- Genus: Spilarctia
- Species: S. leopardina

Binomial name
- Spilarctia leopardina (Kollar, [1844])

Synonyms
- Euprepia leopardina Kollar, 1844; Arctia divisa Walker, 1855; Ardices liturata Walker, 1869; Diacrisia leopardina

Species of moth

Spilarctia leopardina is a moth in the family Erebidae. It was described by Vincenz Kollar in 1844. It is found in Tibet, Nepal, the north-western Himalayas and Kashmir.

== Subspecies ==
- Spilarctia leopardina leopardina
- Spilarctia leopardina dhaulagiriensis Dubatolov & Kishida, 2005 (Nepal)
- Spilarctia leopardina rosepuma Dubatolov, Kishida & C. L. Fang, 2005 (Nepal)
