= Spilarctia reticulata =

Scientific classification
- Domain: Eukaryota
- Kingdom: Animalia
- Phylum: Arthropoda
- Class: Insecta
- Order: Lepidoptera
- Superfamily: Noctuoidea
- Family: Erebidae
- Subfamily: Arctiinae
- Genus: Spilarctia
- Species: S. reticulata

Binomial name
- Spilarctia reticulata (Rothschild, 1933)

Synonyms
- Spilosoma reticulata Rothschild, 1933

Species of moth

Spilarctia reticulata is a moth in the family Erebidae. It was described by Walter Rothschild in 1933. It is found in New Britain.

== External References ==
- Beccaloni, G.; Scoble, M.; Kitching, I.; Simonsen, T.; Robinson, G.; Pitkin, B.; Hine, A.; Lyal, C., eds. (2003). "Spilosoma reticulata". The Global Lepidoptera Names Index. Natural History Museum.
- Spilosoma reticulata at BHL
