= Spilarctia mona =

Scientific classification
- Domain: Eukaryota
- Kingdom: Animalia
- Phylum: Arthropoda
- Class: Insecta
- Order: Lepidoptera
- Superfamily: Noctuoidea
- Family: Erebidae
- Subfamily: Arctiinae
- Genus: Spilarctia
- Species: S. mona

Binomial name
- Spilarctia mona (C. Swinhoe, 1885)

Synonyms
- Spilosoma mona C. Swinhoe, 1885

Species of moth

Spilarctia mona is a moth in the family Erebidae. It was described by Charles Swinhoe in 1885. It is found in southern India.
