= Spilarctia rubriventris =

Scientific classification
- Kingdom: Animalia
- Phylum: Arthropoda
- Clade: Pancrustacea
- Class: Insecta
- Order: Lepidoptera
- Superfamily: Noctuoidea
- Family: Erebidae
- Subfamily: Arctiinae
- Genus: Spilarctia
- Species: S. rubriventris

Binomial name
- Spilarctia rubriventris (Talbot, 1926)

Synonyms
- Spilosoma rubriventris Talbot, 1926

Species of moth

Spilarctia rubriventris is a moth in the family Erebidae. It was described by George Talbot in 1926. It is found on Borneo.
