= Spilarctia wernerthomasi =

Scientific classification
- Domain: Eukaryota
- Kingdom: Animalia
- Phylum: Arthropoda
- Class: Insecta
- Order: Lepidoptera
- Superfamily: Noctuoidea
- Family: Erebidae
- Subfamily: Arctiinae
- Genus: Spilarctia
- Species: S. wernerthomasi

Binomial name
- Spilarctia wernerthomasi (De Vos & Suhartawan, 2011)

Synonyms
- Spilosoma wernerthomasi De Vos & Suhartawan, 2011

Species of moth

Spilarctia wernerthomasi is a moth in the family Erebidae. It was described by Rob de Vos and Daawia Suhartawan in 2011. It is found in New Guinea.
