= Spilarctia rhodochroa =

Scientific classification
- Kingdom: Animalia
- Phylum: Arthropoda
- Class: Insecta
- Order: Lepidoptera
- Superfamily: Noctuoidea
- Family: Erebidae
- Subfamily: Arctiinae
- Genus: Spilarctia
- Species: S. rhodochroa

Binomial name
- Spilarctia rhodochroa (Hampson, 1916)

Synonyms
- Diacrisia rhodochroa Hampson, 1916

Species of moth

Spilarctia rhodochroa is a moth in the family Erebidae. It was described by George Hampson in 1916. It is found on Java in Indonesia.
