= Spilarctia sparsalis =

Scientific classification
- Kingdom: Animalia
- Phylum: Arthropoda
- Class: Insecta
- Order: Lepidoptera
- Superfamily: Noctuoidea
- Family: Erebidae
- Subfamily: Arctiinae
- Genus: Spilarctia
- Species: S. sparsalis

Binomial name
- Spilarctia sparsalis (Walker, [1865])

Synonyms
- Spilosoma sparsalis (Walker, [1865]); Spilosoma rothschildi Roepke, 1944 [1946]

Species of moth

Spilarctia sparsalis is a moth in the family Erebidae. It was described by Francis Walker in 1865. It is found on Sulawesi.
