= Spilarctia ananda =

Scientific classification
- Domain: Eukaryota
- Kingdom: Animalia
- Phylum: Arthropoda
- Class: Insecta
- Order: Lepidoptera
- Superfamily: Noctuoidea
- Family: Erebidae
- Subfamily: Arctiinae
- Genus: Spilarctia
- Species: S. ananda

Binomial name
- Spilarctia ananda (Roepke, 1938)

Synonyms
- Spilosoma ananda Roepke, 1938

Species of moth

Spilarctia ananda is a moth in the family Erebidae. It was described by Walter Karl Johann Roepke in 1938. It is found on Java and possibly Malacca.

The larvae feed on Vernonia species.
