= Spilarctia hetera =

Scientific classification
- Domain: Eukaryota
- Kingdom: Animalia
- Phylum: Arthropoda
- Class: Insecta
- Order: Lepidoptera
- Superfamily: Noctuoidea
- Family: Erebidae
- Subfamily: Arctiinae
- Genus: Spilarctia
- Species: S. hetera

Binomial name
- Spilarctia hetera (Černý, 2009)

Synonyms
- Spilosoma hetera Černý, 2009

Species of moth

Spilarctia hetera is a moth in the family Erebidae. It was described by Karel Černý in 2009. It is found in Thailand.
