= Spilarctia griseabrunnea =

Scientific classification
- Kingdom: Animalia
- Phylum: Arthropoda
- Clade: Pancrustacea
- Class: Insecta
- Order: Lepidoptera
- Superfamily: Noctuoidea
- Family: Erebidae
- Subfamily: Arctiinae
- Genus: Spilarctia
- Species: S. griseabrunnea

Binomial name
- Spilarctia griseabrunnea (Holloway, 1976)

Synonyms
- Spilosoma rhodius griseabrunnea Holloway, 1976; Spilosoma griseabrunnea

Species of moth

Spilarctia griseabrunnea is a moth in the family Erebidae. It was described by Jeremy Daniel Holloway in 1976. It is found on Borneo. The habitat consists of disturbed areas, agricultural areas and secondary vegetation ranging from the lowlands to altitudes of 1,200 meters.
