= Spilarctia thomasi =

Scientific classification
- Kingdom: Animalia
- Phylum: Arthropoda
- Clade: Pancrustacea
- Class: Insecta
- Order: Lepidoptera
- Superfamily: Noctuoidea
- Family: Erebidae
- Subfamily: Arctiinae
- Genus: Spilarctia
- Species: S. thomasi

Binomial name
- Spilarctia thomasi (Holloway, 1988)

Synonyms
- Spilosoma thomasi Holloway, 1988

Species of moth

Spilarctia thomasi is a moth in the family Erebidae. It was described by Jeremy Daniel Holloway in 1988. It is found on Borneo. The habitat consists of montane areas.

The length of the forewings is 18–23 mm.
