= Spilarctia nigrovittatus =

Scientific classification
- Kingdom: Animalia
- Phylum: Arthropoda
- Clade: Pancrustacea
- Class: Insecta
- Order: Lepidoptera
- Superfamily: Noctuoidea
- Family: Erebidae
- Subfamily: Arctiinae
- Genus: Spilarctia
- Species: S. nigrovittatus

Binomial name
- Spilarctia nigrovittatus (Matsumura, 1911)

Synonyms
- Creatonotus nigrovittatus Matsumura, 1911; Spilosoma nigrovittatus (Matsumura, 1911); Spilosoma nigrovittata auct.

Species of moth

Spilarctia nigrovittatus is a moth in the family Erebidae. It was described by Shōnen Matsumura in 1911. It is found in Taiwan.
