= Spilarctia siberuta =

Scientific classification
- Kingdom: Animalia
- Phylum: Arthropoda
- Clade: Pancrustacea
- Class: Insecta
- Order: Lepidoptera
- Superfamily: Noctuoidea
- Family: Erebidae
- Subfamily: Arctiinae
- Genus: Spilarctia
- Species: S. siberuta

Binomial name
- Spilarctia siberuta Dubatolov, 2006

Species of moth

Spilarctia siberuta is a moth in the family Erebidae. It was described by Vladimir Viktorovitch Dubatolov in 2006. It is found in the Mentawai Islands of Indonesia.

== Sources ==
- Pitkin, Brian & Jenkins, Paul. "Search results Family: Arctiidae". Butterflies and Moths of the World. Natural History Museum, London.
