= Spilarctia styx =

Scientific classification
- Domain: Eukaryota
- Kingdom: Animalia
- Phylum: Arthropoda
- Class: Insecta
- Order: Lepidoptera
- Superfamily: Noctuoidea
- Family: Erebidae
- Subfamily: Arctiinae
- Genus: Spilarctia
- Species: S. styx

Binomial name
- Spilarctia styx (Bethune-Baker, 1910)

Synonyms
- Diacrisia styx Bethune-Baker, 1910; Spilosoma styx; Spilosoma styx albistriga Talbot, 1929

Species of moth

Spilarctia styx is a moth in the family Erebidae. It was described by George Thomas Bethune-Baker in 1910. It is found in Papua, Indonesia.

== Subspecies ==
- Spilarctia styx styx
- Spilarctia styx albistriga (Talbot, 1929)
