= Spilarctia sinica =

Scientific classification
- Kingdom: Animalia
- Phylum: Arthropoda
- Class: Insecta
- Order: Lepidoptera
- Superfamily: Noctuoidea
- Family: Erebidae
- Subfamily: Arctiinae
- Genus: Spilarctia
- Species: S. sinica

Binomial name
- Spilarctia sinica Daniel, 1943

Synonyms
- Spilarctia casigneta sinica Daniel, 1943

Species of moth

Spilarctia sinica is a moth in the family Erebidae. It was described by Franz Daniel in 1943. It is found in China (Sichuan, Yunnan, Zhejiang, Hunan, Hubei).
