= Spilarctia tengchongensis =

Scientific classification
- Kingdom: Animalia
- Phylum: Arthropoda
- Clade: Pancrustacea
- Class: Insecta
- Order: Lepidoptera
- Superfamily: Noctuoidea
- Family: Erebidae
- Subfamily: Arctiinae
- Genus: Spilarctia
- Species: S. tengchongensis

Binomial name
- Spilarctia tengchongensis C.-L. Fang & Cao, 1984

Synonyms
- Spilosoma tengchongensis (C.-L. Fang & Cao, 1984)

Species of moth

Spilarctia tengchongensis is a moth in the family Erebidae. It was described by Cheng-Lai Fang and Wencong Cao in 1984. It is found in Yunnan, China.
