= Spilarctia kareli =

Scientific classification
- Kingdom: Animalia
- Phylum: Arthropoda
- Class: Insecta
- Order: Lepidoptera
- Superfamily: Noctuoidea
- Family: Erebidae
- Subfamily: Arctiinae
- Genus: Spilarctia
- Species: S. kareli

Binomial name
- Spilarctia kareli (Thomas, [1993])

Synonyms
- Spilosoma kareli Thomas, [1993]

Species of moth

Spilarctia kareli is a moth in the family Erebidae. It was described by Thomas in 1993. It is found on Mindanao in the Philippines.
