= Spilarctia xanthogastes =

Scientific classification
- Kingdom: Animalia
- Phylum: Arthropoda
- Clade: Pancrustacea
- Class: Insecta
- Order: Lepidoptera
- Superfamily: Noctuoidea
- Family: Erebidae
- Subfamily: Arctiinae
- Genus: Spilarctia
- Species: S. xanthogastes

Binomial name
- Spilarctia xanthogastes C.-L. Fang, 2000

Species of moth

Spilarctia xanthogastes is a moth in the family Erebidae. It was described by Cheng-Lai Fang in 2000. It is found in Yunnan and Tibet in western China.
