= Spilarctia casigneta =

Scientific classification
- Domain: Eukaryota
- Kingdom: Animalia
- Phylum: Arthropoda
- Class: Insecta
- Order: Lepidoptera
- Superfamily: Noctuoidea
- Family: Erebidae
- Subfamily: Arctiinae
- Genus: Spilarctia
- Species: S. casigneta

Binomial name
- Spilarctia casigneta (Rothschild, 1910)

Synonyms
- Euprepia casigneta Kollar, [1844]; Spilosoma sanguinalis Moore, 1865

Species of moth

Spilarctia casigneta is a moth in the family Erebidae. It was described by Walter Rothschild in 1910. It is found in northern Pakistan, the Himalayas, Nepal and Bhutan.
