= Umbria (disambiguation) =

Umbria is a region of modern Italy.

Umbria may also mean:

- Roman Umbria, the region of ancient Roman Italy
- RMS Umbria, a British ship (1884-1910)
- SS Umbria, an Italian ship (1910-1940)
- Cruiser Umbria, Italian protected cruiser (1888-1910)
- Eccellenza Umbria, a football team
- Naarda umbria, a moth species
- Punta Umbría, a municipality in Spain
- Umbri, an ancient Italic people
- Lucin, Utah, also known as Umbria Junction
