= Renauldia lycopodioides =

Conservation status
- Endangered (IUCN 2.3)

Scientific classification
- Kingdom: Plantae
- Division: Bryophyta
- Class: Bryopsida
- Subclass: Bryidae
- Order: Hypnales
- Family: Pterobryaceae
- Genus: Renauldia
- Species: R. lycopodioides

Binomial name
- Renauldia lycopodioides Bizot ex Pócs.

Species of moss

Renauldia lycopodioides is a species of moss in the family Pterobryaceae. It is endemic to Tanzania, where it is known from only two locations and is considered an endangered species. It grows on tree branches in forested habitat. It is threatened by deforestation.
