= Phylloblastia bielczykiae =

Scientific classification
- Kingdom: Fungi
- Division: Ascomycota
- Class: Eurotiomycetes
- Order: Verrucariales
- Family: Verrucariaceae
- Genus: Phylloblastia
- Species: P. bielczykiae

Binomial name
- Phylloblastia bielczykiae Flakus & Lücking (2008)

Species of lichen

Phylloblastia bielczykiae is a little-known species of foliicolous (leaf-dwelling) lichen in the family Verrucariaceae. Found in Bolivia, it was formally described as a new species in 2008. The lichen has an indistinct, crustose thallus with a mealy (farinose) to grainy (granulose) texture, and a pale yellowish-green to olivaceous colour. It is somewhat similar to Phylloblastia inconspicua, but has smaller ascospores.

== Taxonomy ==
Phylloblastia bielczykiae was described as a new species of Verrucariaceae in 2008 by Adam Flakus and Robert Lücking, based on material collected from leaves in a lowland Amazon forest enclave near Lake Copaiba, Beni Department, Bolivia. The species epithet honours the Polish lichenologist Urszula Bielczyk for her guidance of the first author. Within Phylloblastia it belongs to the group of foliicolous (leaf-dwelling) species that form discrete perithecia directly on the hostleaf surface.

The new taxon most closely resembles P. inconspicua but can be separated by its markedly shorter, narrowly ellipsoid, somewhat muriform ascospores (40–55 × 7.5–13 μm versus oblong ascospores up to 120 μm in the latter). Other superficially similar species differ either in spore septation or in spore shape and therefore do not match the Bolivian material.

== Description ==
The thallus is inconspicuous—often little more than a pale yellow-green to olive, powdery film up to about 17 μm thick—that sits directly on the leaf cuticle. It consists of loose, colourless hyphae forming minute (20–100 μm) granules intermingled with spherical green algal cells 5–12 micrometres (μm) in diameter.

Perithecia are moderately numerous, blackish, slightly flattened globes 135–175 μm tall and 175–200 μm wide; they may be half embedded in the thallus but often sit free on the surface. The two-layered exciple has a colourless inner wall and an olive-brown to blackish outer wall. Gelatinising paraphyses disappear early in development. Asci are bitunicate, broadly club-shaped (clavate) (50–75 × 15–36 μm) with a distinct iodine-negative ocular chamber. Each ascus contains eight narrowly ellipsoid, colourless spores bearing 3–11 transverse septa; mature spores measure 40–55 × 7.5–13 μm and are only faintly constricted at the septa. No secondary metabolites were detected by chemical tests, and no asexual morph is known.

== Habitat and distribution ==
The species is presently known solely from its type locality—an island of humid south-western Amazon forest surrounded by savanna near Lake Copaiba (roughly 190 m elevation) in Bolivia's José Ballivián Province. It was observed growing on living leaves of an unidentified vascular plant in the understory. The species was considered to be isolated to Bolivia as of 2013.

Outside the Neotropics, material provisionally identified as P. bielczykiae has been collected on the evergreen leaves of holly (Ilex) in southern England, where the fungus appears to be only occasional. The British collections closely resemble the Bolivian type but possess a slightly more developed lichenised thallus and differ from the morphologically similar P. fortuita in having larger, more septate ascospores and longer periphyses. Because P. bielczykiae was described from a single tropical savanna site, the revision cautions that the English material may represent an as-yet undescribed species—or merely especially well-developed specimens of P. fortuita.
