= Naarda ascensalis =

Scientific classification
- Domain: Eukaryota
- Kingdom: Animalia
- Phylum: Arthropoda
- Class: Insecta
- Order: Lepidoptera
- Superfamily: Noctuoidea
- Family: Erebidae
- Genus: Naarda
- Species: N. ascensalis

Binomial name
- Naarda ascensalis Swinhoe

Species of moth

Naarda ascensalis is a species of moth in the family Noctuidae first described by Charles Swinhoe.
