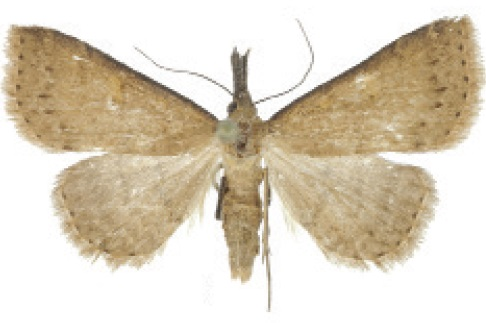
- Female
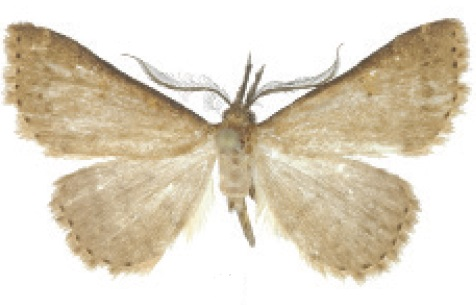
- Male

Scientific classification
- Domain: Eukaryota
- Kingdom: Animalia
- Phylum: Arthropoda
- Class: Insecta
- Order: Lepidoptera
- Superfamily: Noctuoidea
- Family: Erebidae
- Genus: Naarda
- Species: N. ardeola

Binomial name
- Naarda ardeola Tóth & Ronkay, 2014

= Naarda ardeola =

Species of moth

Naarda ardeola is a species of moth of the family Noctuidae. It was first described by Balázs Tóth and László Aladár Ronkay in 2014. It is found in the mountains of northern Thailand.

The wingspan is 20–21 mm. The base of the male forewing has a scent organ built up of long, hairy scales. The characteristic wing pattern features of the species are: the forewing costa is minutely concave in males. The pattern is similar in both sexes. The ground colour is light brown and the subterminal line is slightly paler with some blackish dots at the inner side. The postmedial line is slightly darker than the ground colour. The hindwings are slightly paler than the forewings, with slightly more conspicuous fasciae.

== Etymology ==
The species name refers to the heron-shaped male genitalia.
