= Naarda gigaloba =

Scientific classification
- Domain: Eukaryota
- Kingdom: Animalia
- Phylum: Arthropoda
- Class: Insecta
- Order: Lepidoptera
- Superfamily: Noctuoidea
- Family: Erebidae
- Genus: Naarda
- Species: N. gigaloba

Binomial name
- Naarda gigaloba Tóth & Ronkay, 2015

Species of moth

Naarda gigaloba is a moth of the family Erebidae first described by Balázs Tóth and László Aladár Ronkay in 2015. It is found in Sri Lanka.

Adult wingspan is 21 mm. Antennae bipectinate (comb like on both sides) in the male. Female with filiform (thread like) and ciliate (hair like) antennae. Labial palpi narrow, conspicuous and directed upwards. Forewing grayish, which is slightly darker in females. Postmedial line narrow, slightly darker. Deep ocherous reniform stigma is ovoid. A conspicuous black spot in its lower half. Orbicular stigma tiny. Forewing costa straight in male. Hindwings off white which gradually becomes grayish toward the outer edges. Transverse line indistinct. Male has huge lobe on the valva, which is the largest of the genus. Uncus simple. In female genitalia, ovipositor lobes angular. Sterigma present. Ductus bursae broad.
