= Renauldia =

Scientific classification
- Kingdom: Plantae
- Division: Bryophyta
- Class: Bryopsida
- Subclass: Bryidae
- Order: Hypnales
- Family: Pterobryaceae
- Genus: Renauldia; Müll. Hal.

Genus of mosses

Renauldia is a genus of mosses in the family Pterobryaceae.

Species include:

- Renauldia africana
- Renauldia baueri Thér.
- Renauldia chilensis Thér.
- Renauldia cochlearifolia Broth.
- Renauldia dusenii (Broth.) Broth.
- Renauldia hildebrandtielloides Müll. Hal.
- Renauldia hoehnelii (Müll. Hal.) Broth.
- Renauldia lycopodioides Bizot ex Pócs
- Renauldia mexicana (Mitt.) H.A. Crum
- Renauldia paradoxica B.H. Allen
- Renauldia patentissima (Hampe) Broth.
- Renauldia peruviana (Mitt.) Broth.
