= Naarda albopunctalis =

Scientific classification
- Domain: Eukaryota
- Kingdom: Animalia
- Phylum: Arthropoda
- Class: Insecta
- Order: Lepidoptera
- Superfamily: Noctuoidea
- Family: Erebidae
- Genus: Naarda
- Species: N. albopunctalis

Binomial name
- Naarda albopunctalis Rothschild, 1915

Species of moth

Naarda albopunctalis is a species of moth in the family Noctuidae first described by Rothschild in 1915.
