= Naarda leptosigna =

Scientific classification
- Domain: Eukaryota
- Kingdom: Animalia
- Phylum: Arthropoda
- Class: Insecta
- Order: Lepidoptera
- Superfamily: Noctuoidea
- Family: Erebidae
- Genus: Naarda
- Species: N. leptosigna

Binomial name
- Naarda leptosigna Tóth & Ronkay, 2015

Species of moth

Naarda leptosigna is a moth of the family Erebidae first described by Balázs Tóth and László Aladár Ronkay in 2015. It is found in Sri Lanka.

Adult wingspan is 13–14 mm. Antennae filiform, ciliate and setose in both sexes. Labial palpi convex, dorsal edge rounded. Forewing dark grayish brown. Postmedial line dark and conspicuous. Bright ocherous reniform stigma is narrow and triangular. Hindwings grayish. Transverse line distinct. Male has huge lobe on the valva, which is the largest of the genus. Uncus medium long, broad and slightly curved. Saccus broad based. Juxta rhomboid. Valva narrow based, elongate. Non tapered aedeagus is stout and curved. In female genitalia, ovipositor lobes angular. Ductus bursae medium long. Corpus bursae smooth and ovoid.
