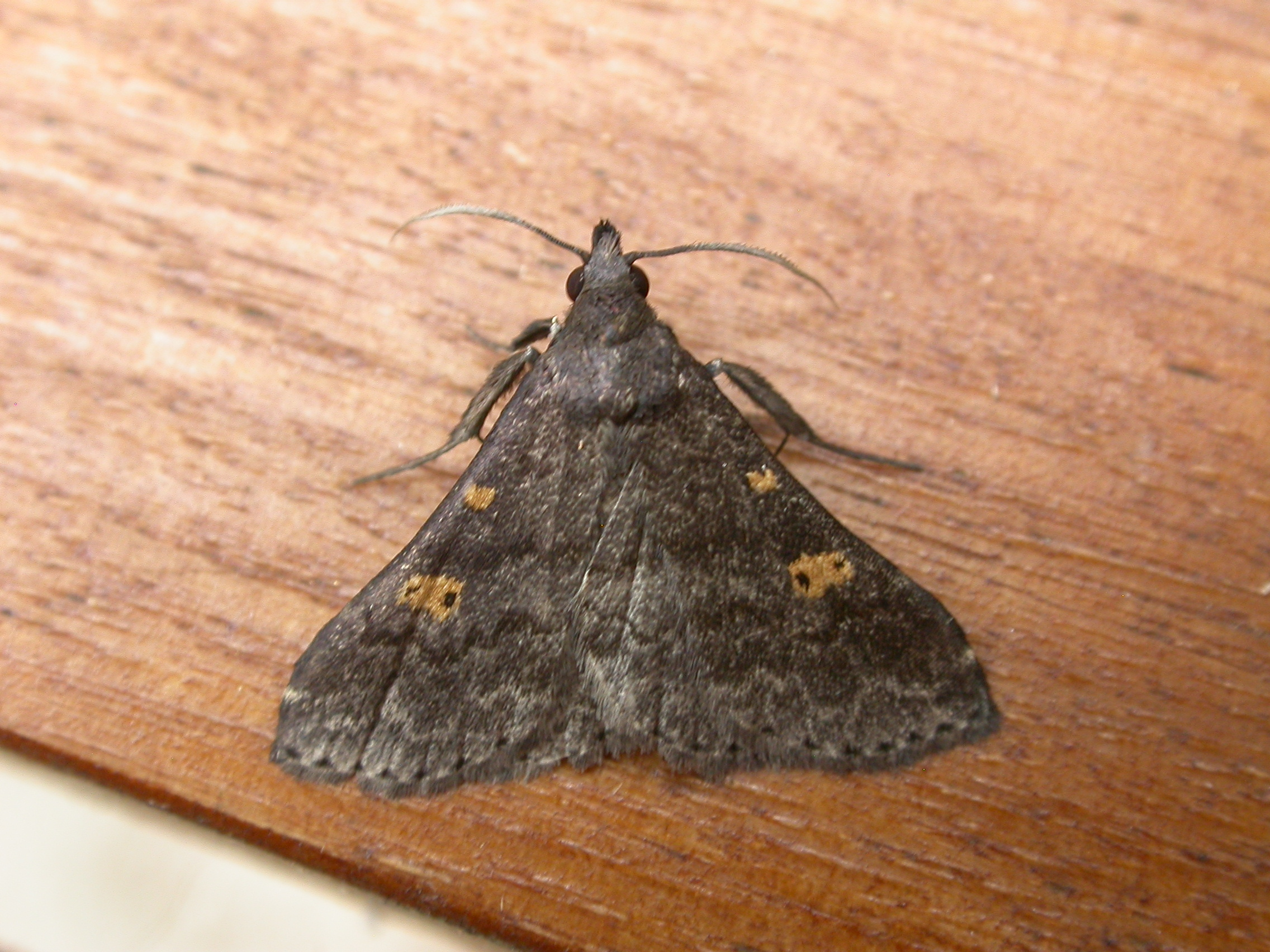
- Naarda xanthonephra

Scientific classification
- Kingdom: Animalia
- Phylum: Arthropoda
- Clade: Pancrustacea
- Class: Insecta
- Order: Lepidoptera
- Superfamily: Noctuoidea
- Family: Erebidae
- Subfamily: Herminiinae
- Genus: Naarda; Walker, 1866

Type species
- Naarda bisignata Walker, 1866

Species
- Multiple, see text

Synonyms
- Gynaephila Staudinger, 1892; Ptyophora Hampson, 1893; Eublemmara Bethune-Baker, 1911

= Naarda =

Genus of moths

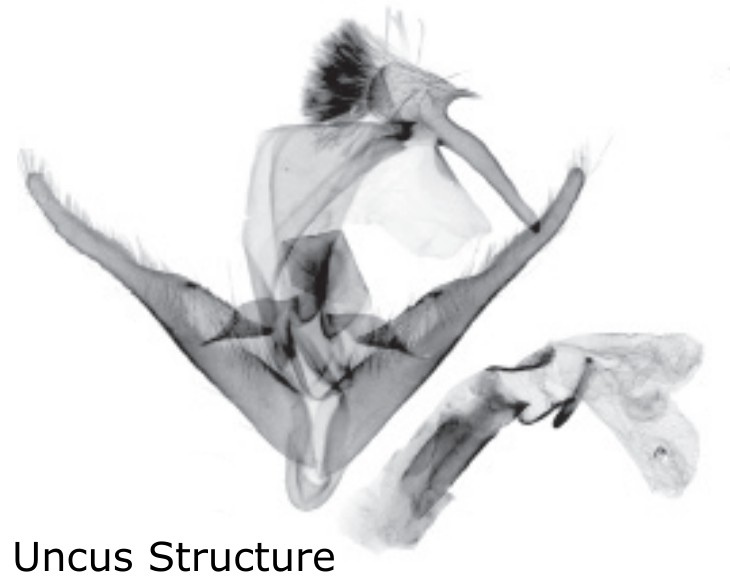
Uncus structure of the Naarda genus

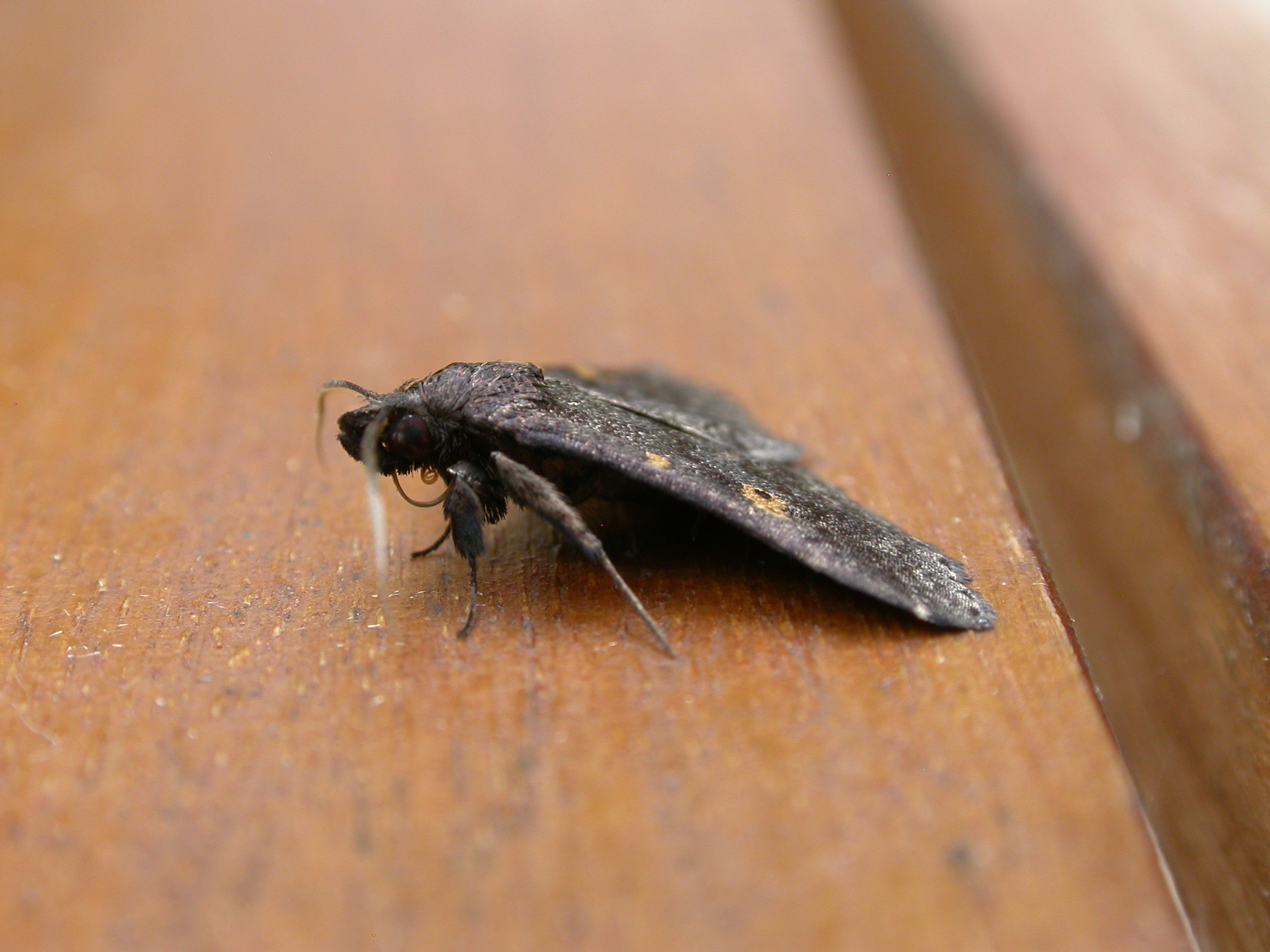
Naarda xanthonephra profile

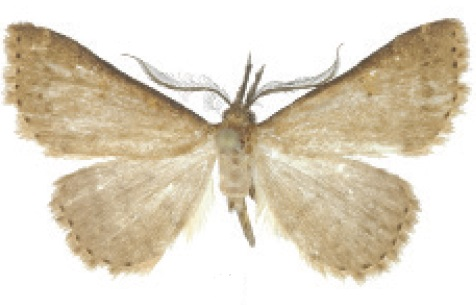
Male Naarda ardeola

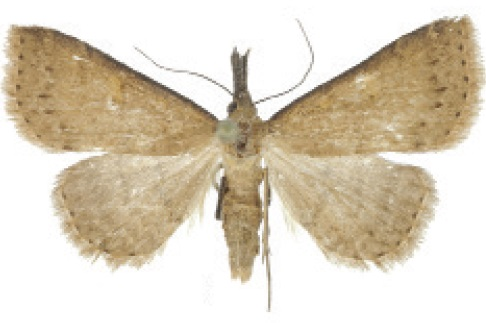
Female Naarda ardeola

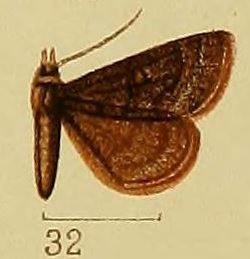
Naarda xanthonephra, circa 1910

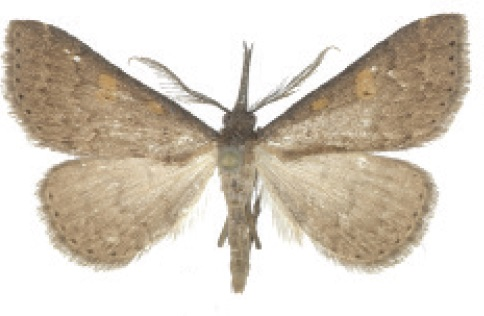
Male Naarda egrettoides

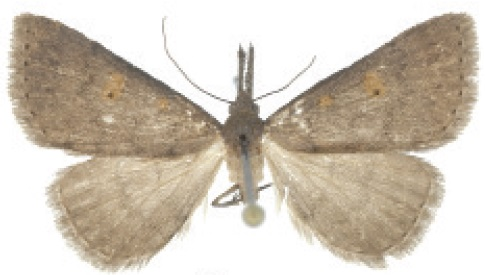
Female Naarda egrettoides

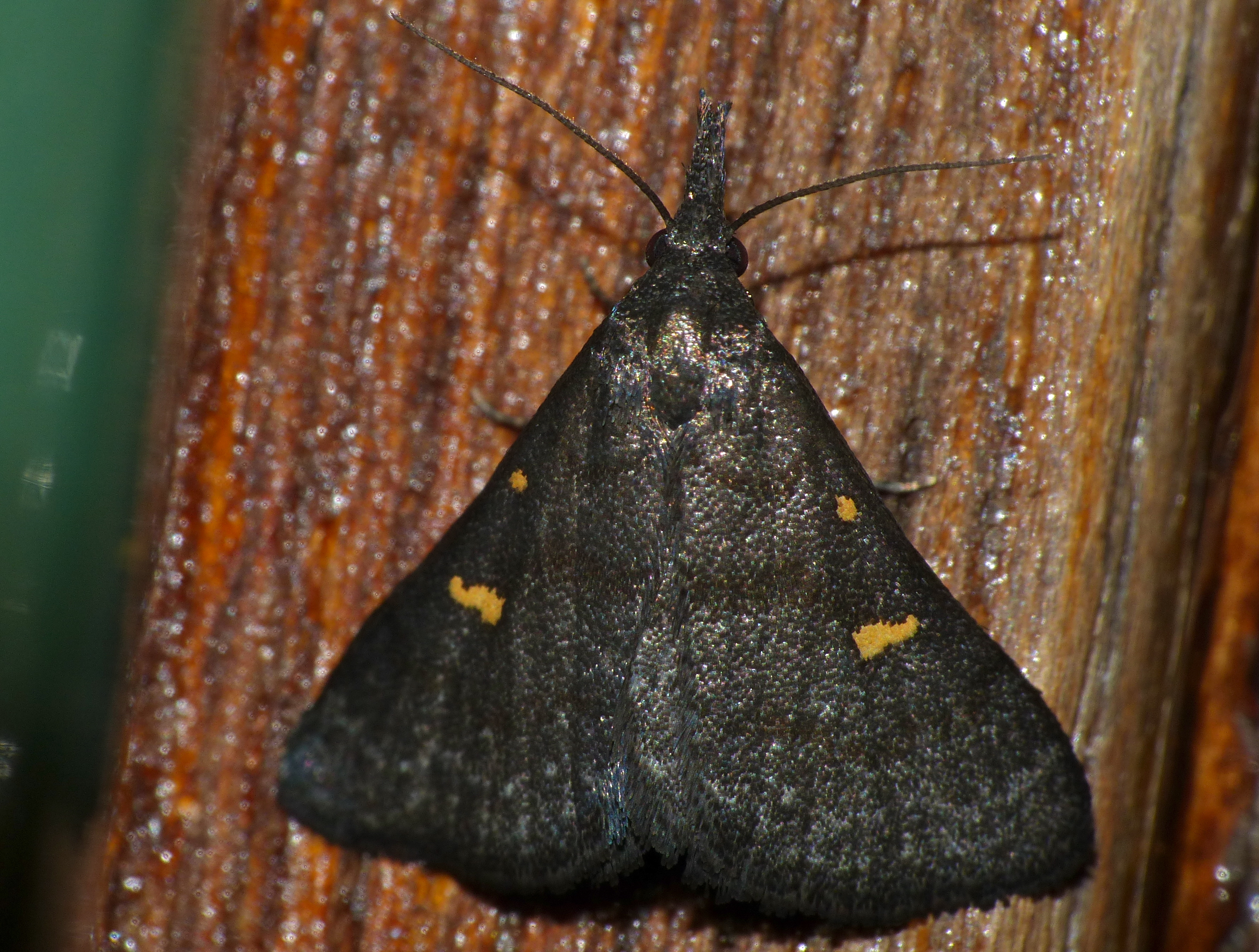
Naarda moth of either the xanthopis or leucopis species. (These species are only distinguishable by analysis of the male genitalia.) Note the dark yellow elongated stomata reflected bilaterally on the forewings.

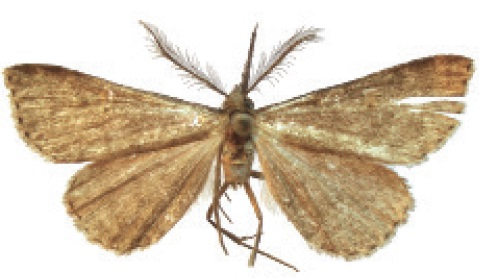
Male Naarda pocstamasi

Naarda is a large genus of erebid moths which currently encompasses 108 species. Initially identified by Francis Walker in 1866, it is in the family Erebidae. Somewhat ruddy in appearance, this genus is primarily distinguishable for its generally slender thorax and abdomen, and straight, porrect labial palpi. Most species are dark beige, but shading can reach a deep charcoal. Most species possess muddy yellow, reniform, orbicular stigmata featured on the forewings, which is reflected bilaterally superior on some species (though these may be significantly more minute and successively annular).

== Physical features ==
The wingspan is between 19 and 22mm, dependent on the species.

The rami of the antenna are, at the maximum of its width, 9-10 times longer than the axis of the antenna, and the apical segments lack the rami.

Aside from the elongated and easily recognizable porrect labial palpi of both sexes, (which are usually 5 times as long as the diameter of the eye, with the tertiary segment comparatively longer), and the relatively broad forewings with straight and even costa, substantial dissimilarity is present in the male sex.

=== Male ===
The most prominent autapomorphy is the uncus structure, which resembles the head of a long-billed bird. The uncus has a large, rounded subbasal dorsal bulb bearing a small, acute frontal spine and a large group of long hairs standing apart, (in the likeness of a forelock), and a long, straight, atypically dilated rounded distal section.

Other recurrent traits of the clasping apparatus across the entirety of the Naarda genus include the substantially broad tegumen; the well-developed and stout transtilla; and the variably broad, generally triangular valvae. The entire structure resembles a flying bird.

The phallus is short, straight, and thick; the vesica is inflated and basally broad. In most species, the ductus ejaculatoris is directed forward in the axis of the phallus. The cornutus is variably large, and its texture resembles that of a sponge cake.

== Range ==
Of the 108 known species, virtually the entirety have been discovered in Asia, Southeast Asia, and Africa, but a handful are in the northern Australian region.

Countries where Naarda genus has been documented:

- Angola
- Australia
- Borneo
- Burma
- Celebes
- China
- India
- Indonesia
- Japan
- Laos
- Madagascar
- Malawi
- Nepal
- New Guinea
- Nigeria
- Philippines
- Somalia
- South Africa
- Sri Lanka
- Sumatra
- Taiwan
- Tanzania
- Uganda
- Vietnam

== Species list ==
- Naarda abnormalis Hampson, 1912
- Naarda acolutha Holloway, 2008 (Borneo)
- Naarda albopunctalis Rothschild, 1915 (New Guinea)
- Naarda albostigma Rothschild, 1915 (New Guinea)
- Naarda alternata Tóth & Ronkay, 2015 (Indonesia, Philippines, Thailand)
- Naarda annulata Tóth & Ronkay, 2015 (China)
- Naarda ardeola Tóth & Ronkay, 2015 (Thailand)
- Naarda ascensalis Swinhoe
- Naarda atrata Tóth & Ronkay, 2015 (Thailand)
- Naarda atrirena (Hampson, 1912) (Sri Lanka)
- Naarda aurea Tóth & Ronkay, 2015 (Nepal)
- Naarda bankhomensis Tóth & Ronkay, 2015 (Vietnam)
- Naarda barlowi Holloway, 2008 (Borneo)
- Naarda bicolora Tóth & Ronkay, 2015 (Cambodia)
- Naarda bipunctata Tóth & Ronkay, 2015 (Thailand)
- Naarda bisignata Walker, 1866 (Indonesia)
- Naarda blepharota (Strand, 1920) (Taiwan)
- Naarda caesia Tóth & Ronkay, 2015 (Sumatra)
- Naarda calliceros Turner, 1932 (Australia)
- Naarda calligrapha Tóth & Ronkay, 2015 (India, Burma and Indonesia)
- Naarda capreola Tóth & Ronkay, 2015 (Cambodia)
- Naarda cinerea Tóth & Ronkay, 2015 (Taiwan)
- Naarda cingulata Tóth & Ronkay, 2015 (Thailand)
- Naarda clitodes D. S. Fletcher, 1961 (Uganda)
- Naarda coerulea Tóth & Ronkay, 2015 (Nepal, Vietnam)
- Naarda conifera Tóth & Ronkay, 2015 (Nepal)
- Naarda costicorna Tóth & Ronkay, 2015 (Philippines)
- Naarda crassipes Tóth & Ronkay, 2015 (Thailand)
- Naarda curiosipalpa Tóth & Ronkay, 2015 (Philippines)
- Naarda dentata Tóth & Ronkay, 2015 (Nepal, China)
- Naarda digitata Tóth & Ronkay, 2015 (Taiwan)
- Naarda egrettoides Tóth & Ronkay, 2015 (Thailand)
- Naarda felinopsis Tóth & Ronkay, 2015 (Vietnam)
- Naarda flavisignata Vari, 1962 (South Africa)
- Naarda fuliginaria (Bethune-Baker, 1911) (Angola)
- Naarda fulvirena Tóth & Ronkay, 2015 (Nepal)
- Naarda fulvirenoides Tóth & Ronkay, 2015 (Thailand)
- Naarda furcatella Tóth & Ronkay, 2015 (Cambodia, Sumatra, Thailand)
- Naarda furcipalpa Tóth & Ronkay, 2015 (Brunei)
- Naarda fuscicosta (Hampson, 1891) (India)
- Naarda gigaloba Tóth & Ronkay, 2015 (Sri Lanka)
- Naarda glauculalis Hampson, 1893 (Sri Lanka)
- Naarda hallasana Tóth & Ronkay, 2015 (Korea)
- Naarda hastata Tóth & Ronkay, 2015 (Thailand, Vietnam)
- Naarda hoenei Tóth & Ronkay, 2015 (China)
- Naarda huettleri Tóth & Ronkay, 2015 (Sri Lanka)
- Naarda icterica (D. S. Fletcher, 1961) (Uganda)
- Naarda imitata Tóth & Ronkay, 2015 (Cambodia)
- Naarda ineffectalis (Walker, [1859]) (Sri Lanka, Borneo)
- Naarda inouei Tóth & Ronkay, 2015 (Nepal, India)
- Naarda ivelona Viette, 1965 (Madagascar)
- Naarda jucundalis (Snellen, 1880) (Celebes)
- Naarda lancanga Deng & Han, 2011
- Naarda laoana Tóth & Ronkay, 2015 (Laos)
- Naarda laufellalis (Walker, 1859) (Borneo)
- Naarda leptovalva Tóth & Ronkay, 2015 (Nepal)
- Naarda leptosigna Tóth & Ronkay, 2015 (Sri Lanka)
- Naarda leptotypa Turner, 1932
- Naarda leucopis Hampson, 1902 (South Africa)
- Naarda lingualis Tóth & Ronkay, 2015 (China)
- Naarda maculifera (Staudinger, 1892)
- Naarda magnifica Tóth & Ronkay, 2015 (Thailand)
- Naarda marginata Holloway, 2008 (Borneo)
- Naarda melanomma Hampson, 1902 (South Africa)
- Naarda melinau Holloway, 2008 (Borneo)
- Naarda melistigma Tóth & Ronkay, 2015 (Taiwan)
- Naarda mirabilis Tóth & Ronkay, 2015 (Vietnam)
- Naarda molybdota (Hampson, 1912) (India)
- Naarda muluensis Holloway, 2008 (Borneo)
- Naarda murina Tóth & Ronkay, 2015 (Thailand)
- Naarda nepalensis Tóth & Ronkay, 2015 (Nepal)
- Naarda nigripalpis Hampson, 1916 (Somalia)
- Naarda nigrissima Tóth & Ronkay, 2015 (Cambodia, Thailand and Taiwan)
- Naarda nodariodes Prout, 1928 (Borneo)
- Naarda notata Hampson, 1891
- Naarda numismata Tóth & Ronkay, 2015 (India)
- Naarda nymphoida Tóth & Ronkay, 2015 (Vietnam)
- Naarda ochreistigma Hampson, 1893
- Naarda ochronota Wileman, 1915 (Taiwan)
- Naarda octogesima Tóth & Ronkay, 2015 (Thailand)
- Naarda palawana Tóth & Ronkay, 2015 (Philippines)
- Naarda pallida Tóth & Ronkay, 2015 (Indonesia)
- Naarda pectinata Sugi, 1982 (Japan)
- Naarda penicula Tóth & Ronkay, 2015 (China)
- Naarda picata Tóth & Ronkay, 2015 (Taiwan)
- Naarda plenirena de Joannis, 1929 (Vietnam)
- Naarda plumbea Tóth & Ronkay, 2015 (Nepal)
- Naarda pocstamasi Tóth & Ronkay, 2015 (Vietnam)
- Naarda postpallida de Joannis, 1929 (Vietnam)
- Naarda punctirena (Sugi, 1982)
- Naarda purpurea Tóth & Ronkay, 2015 (Laos)
- Naarda purpurisigna (Holloway, 2008)
- Naarda secreta Tóth & Ronkay, 2015 (Taiwan)
- Naarda serra Holloway, 2008 (Borneo)
- Naarda sonibacsi Tóth & Ronkay, 2015 (Nepal)
- Naarda spinivesica Tóth & Ronkay, 2015 (Taiwan)
- Naarda sumatrana Tóth & Ronkay, 2015
- Naarda submuluensis Holloway, 2008 (Borneo)
- Naarda symethusalis (Walker, 1859)
- Naarda tandoana (Bethune-Baker, 1911) (Angola)
- Naarda tenuifascia Tóth & Ronkay, 2015 (Vietnam)
- Naarda tetramacula Tóth & Ronkay, 2015 (Sumatra)
- Naarda truncata Tóth & Ronkay, 2015 (Philippines)
- Naarda umbria Hampson, 1902 (Sri Lanka)
- Naarda unipunctata Bethune-Baker, 1911 (Nigeria)
- Naarda uthanti Tóth & Ronkay, 2015 (Burma)
- Naarda variegata Tóth & Ronkay, 2015 (Taiwan)
- Naarda vicina Tóth & Ronkay, 2015 (Philippines)
- Naarda xanthonephra Turner, 1908 (Australia)
- Naarda xanthopis Hampson (South Africa)
