= Naarda unipunctata =

Scientific classification
- Kingdom: Animalia
- Phylum: Arthropoda
- Class: Insecta
- Order: Lepidoptera
- Superfamily: Noctuoidea
- Family: Erebidae
- Genus: Naarda
- Species: N. unipunctata

Binomial name
- Naarda unipunctata Bethune-Baker, 1911

Species of moth

Naarda unipunctata is a species of moth in the family Noctuidae first described by George Thomas Bethune-Baker in 1911.
