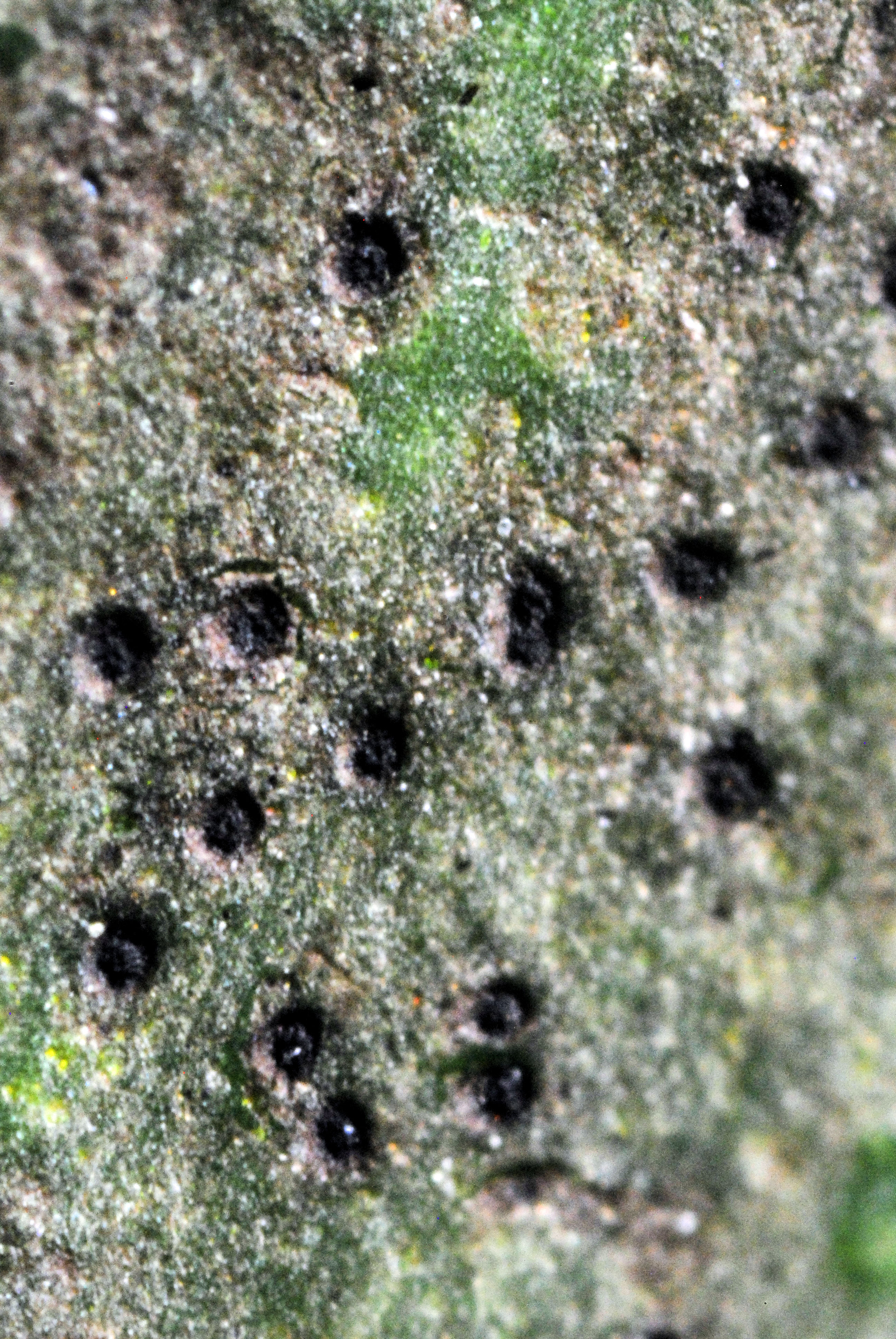

Scientific classification
- Domain: Eukaryota
- Kingdom: Fungi
- Division: Ascomycota
- Class: Eurotiomycetes
- Order: Verrucariales
- Family: Verrucariaceae
- Genus: Phylloblastia
- Species: P. inexpectata

Binomial name
- Phylloblastia inexpectata Sérus., Coppins & Lücking (2007)

= Phylloblastia inexpectata =

Species of lichen

Phylloblastia inexpectata is a species of foliicolous (leaf-dwelling) lichen in the family Verrucariaceae. Found in Europe, it was formally described by lichenologists Emmanuël Sérusiaux, Brian John Coppins, and Robert Lücking. The type specimen was collected by the second author in Dunskey Glen Woods (Portpatrick, Scotland), where it was found growing on the leaves of a Prunus laurocerasus tree growing near a stream. It has also been collected in England, southern Italy, Madeira, and Spain.

== Description ==
The lichen has a smooth, thin, and inconspicuous thallus that is brownish green or pale greyish green in colour (sometimes tinged with pink). It is up to 5 mm across (usually much less) and about 15–25 μm thick. The photobiont partner is a green alga that is rounded and measures 5–10 μm in diameter; intermixed with fungal hyphae, they can be aggregated in irregular clumps or plates. The fruiting structures, the perithecia, are initially hemispherical but later develop a depression at the top of the structure that makes them appear wart-shaped. Measuring 0.1–0.15 mm in diameter and about 0.1 mm high, they are pinkish brown to almost black. The ascospores, which measure eight per ascus, have a fusiform to ellipsoid shape and have three septa, and typically measure 14–16 by 4.5–5 μm. Specimens collected in Spain have a single septum, but have otherwise identical morphology with specimens found elsewhere.
