= Naarda notata =

Scientific classification
- Kingdom: Animalia
- Phylum: Arthropoda
- Class: Insecta
- Order: Lepidoptera
- Superfamily: Noctuoidea
- Family: Erebidae
- Genus: Naarda
- Species: N. notata

Binomial name
- Naarda notata Hampson, 1891

Species of moth

Naarda notata is a species of moth in the family Noctuidae first described by George Hampson in 1891.
