= Naarda ineffectalis =

Scientific classification
- Kingdom: Animalia
- Phylum: Arthropoda
- Class: Insecta
- Order: Lepidoptera
- Superfamily: Noctuoidea
- Family: Erebidae
- Genus: Naarda
- Species: N. ineffectalis

Binomial name
- Naarda ineffectalis Walker, 1859

Synonyms
- Hypena ineffectalis; Naarda bisignata; Hypena ochreistigma; Ptyophora ochreistigma

Species of moth

Naarda ineffectalis is a type of moth in the family Noctuidae first described by Francis Walker in 1859. It is found in India, Sri Lanka, Borneo and Sula.

== Description ==
Its wingspan is 16 mm. Palpi short and porrect (extending forward), where the second joint thickened by being clothed with very long on upperside so as almost to hide the third joint. Antennae of male with long cilia. Body fuscous black. Forewings with traces of sinuous antemedial, medial, and postmedial dark lines. Forewings with a costal fold and an erectile tuft of long hair at base. There is an ochreous spot in cell and band on discocellulars. Hindwings with traces of antemedial and postmedial lines.
