= Naarda ivelona =

Scientific classification
- Kingdom: Animalia
- Phylum: Arthropoda
- Class: Insecta
- Order: Lepidoptera
- Superfamily: Noctuoidea
- Family: Erebidae
- Genus: Naarda
- Species: N. ivelona

Binomial name
- Naarda ivelona Viette, 1965

Species of moth

Naarda ivelona is a species of moth in the family Noctuidae from Madagascar. It was described by Pierre Viette in 1965.

Its holotype had been collected in the Ivelona valley and is preserved at the MNHN.
