= Naarda jucundalis =

Scientific classification
- Kingdom: Animalia
- Phylum: Arthropoda
- Class: Insecta
- Order: Lepidoptera
- Superfamily: Noctuoidea
- Family: Erebidae
- Genus: Naarda
- Species: N. jucundalis

Binomial name
- Naarda jucundalis Snellen

Species of moth

Naarda jucundalis is a species of moth in the family Noctuidae first described by Snellen.
