= Naarda calliceros =

Scientific classification
- Domain: Eukaryota
- Kingdom: Animalia
- Phylum: Arthropoda
- Class: Insecta
- Order: Lepidoptera
- Superfamily: Noctuoidea
- Family: Erebidae
- Genus: Naarda
- Species: N. calliceros

Binomial name
- Naarda calliceros Turner, 1932

Species of moth

Naarda calliceros is a species of moth in the family Noctuidae first described by Alfred Jefferis Turner in 1932.
