= Naarda huettleri =

Scientific classification
- Domain: Eukaryota
- Kingdom: Animalia
- Phylum: Arthropoda
- Class: Insecta
- Order: Lepidoptera
- Superfamily: Noctuoidea
- Family: Erebidae
- Genus: Naarda
- Species: N. huettleri

Binomial name
- Naarda huettleri Tóth & Ronkay, 2015

Species of moth

Naarda huettleri is a moth of the family Erebidae first described by Balázs Tóth and László Aladár Ronkay in 2015. It is found in Sri Lanka.

The adult wingspan is 11 mm. The forewings and hindwings are dark brownish gray in colour. Its transverse line is indistinct. The light yellowish reniform stigma is semilunar with a large black spot at the bottom half. The orbicular stigma is yellowish. In males, genitalia is uncus short and hooked. The saccus is broad-based. The Juxta are large, rounded triangular.
