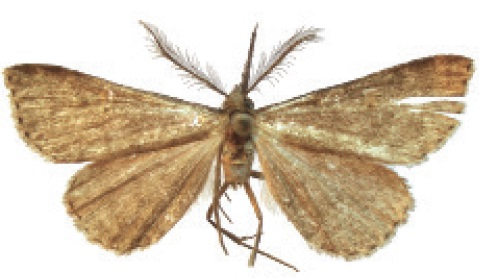
- Male

Scientific classification
- Domain: Eukaryota
- Kingdom: Animalia
- Phylum: Arthropoda
- Class: Insecta
- Order: Lepidoptera
- Superfamily: Noctuoidea
- Family: Erebidae
- Genus: Naarda
- Species: N. pocstamasi

Binomial name
- Naarda pocstamasi Tóth & Ronkay, 2014

= Naarda pocstamasi =

Species of moth

Naarda pocstamasi is a species of moth of the family Noctuidae. It was first described by Balázs Tóth and László Aladár Ronkay in 2014. It is found in northern Vietnam.

The wingspan is about 22 mm. The characteristic wing pattern features of the species are: The ground colour is light brownish grey with a prominent terminal line, fragmented to blackish dots. There are indistinct subterminal, postmedial and antemedial lines. The colouration and pattern of the hindwings is like that of the forewings.

== Etymology ==
The species is named for Hungarian botanist Tamás Pócs, who collected the species.
