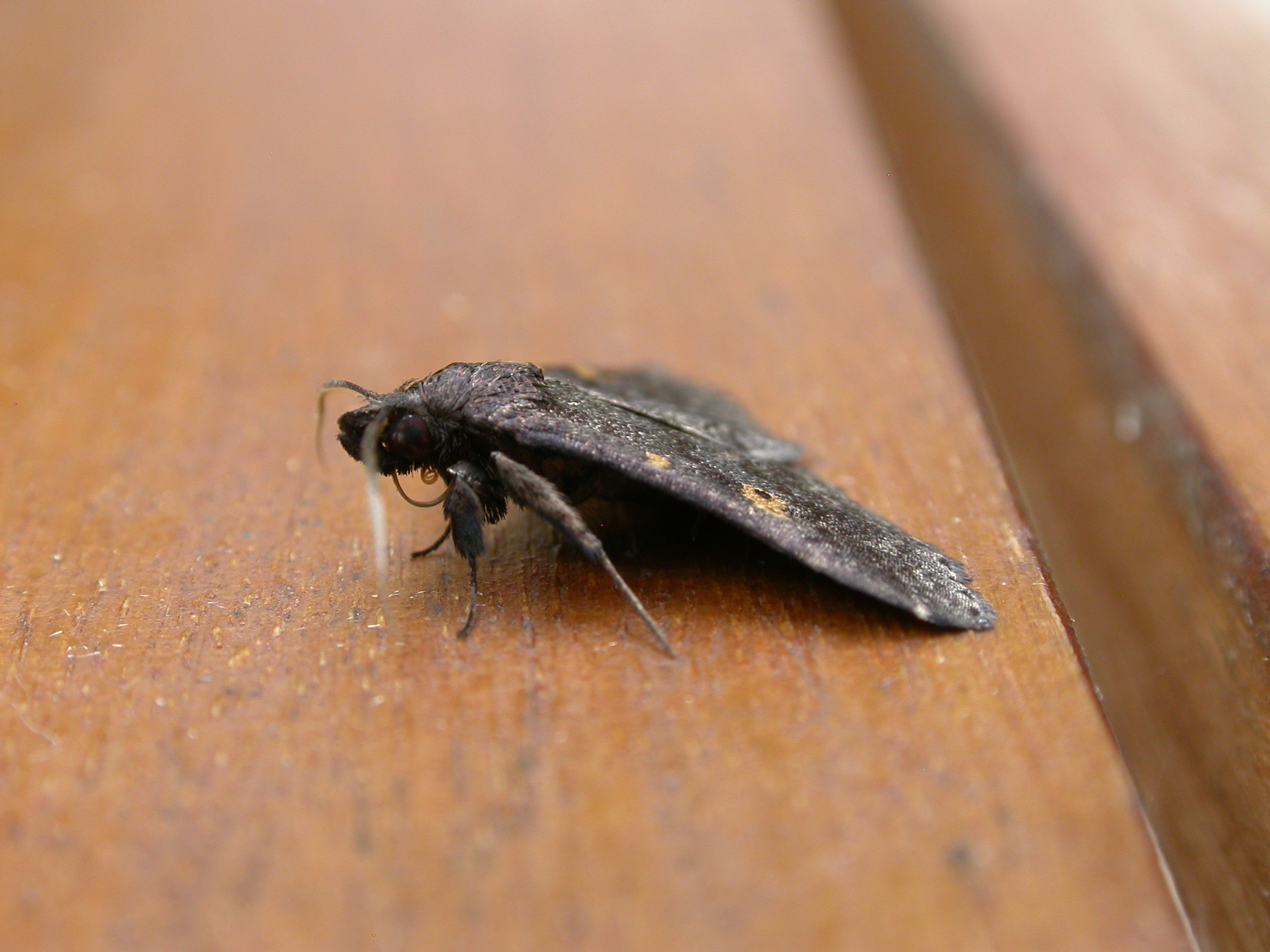

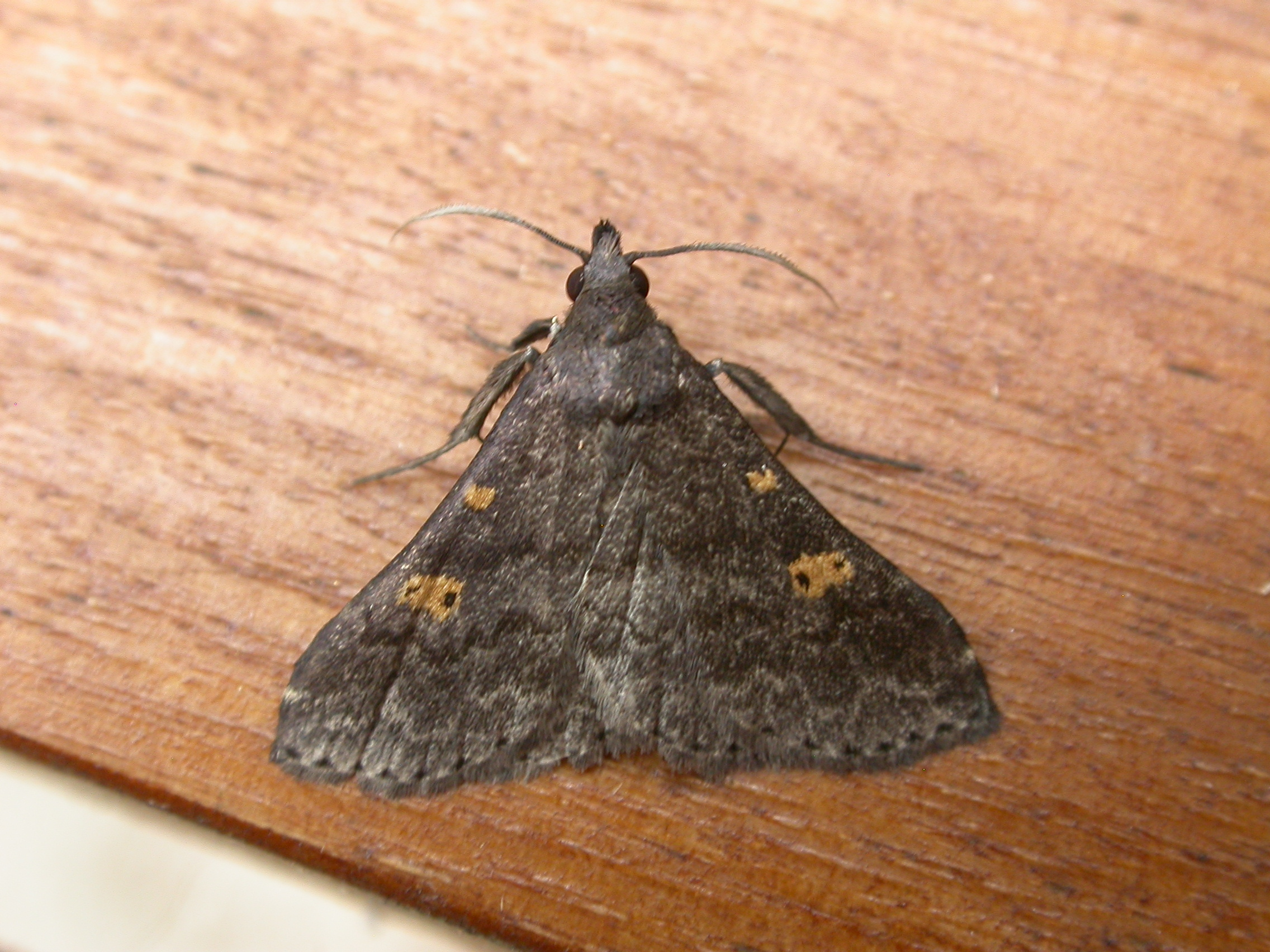

Scientific classification
- Domain: Eukaryota
- Kingdom: Animalia
- Phylum: Arthropoda
- Class: Insecta
- Order: Lepidoptera
- Superfamily: Noctuoidea
- Family: Erebidae
- Genus: Naarda
- Species: N. xanthonephra

Binomial name
- Naarda xanthonephra Turner, 1908

Synonyms
- Naarda coelopis

= Naarda xanthonephra =

Species of moth

Naarda xanthonephra is a species of moth in the family Erebidae first described by Alfred Jefferis Turner in 1908. It is found in Australia.

A second species with the same name was described by George Hampson in 1910 from Zambia. No replacement name had been attributed to this one by now.
