= Naarda flavisignata =

Scientific classification
- Kingdom: Animalia
- Phylum: Arthropoda
- Class: Insecta
- Order: Lepidoptera
- Superfamily: Noctuoidea
- Family: Erebidae
- Genus: Naarda
- Species: N. flavisignata

Binomial name
- Naarda flavisignata Vári, 1962

Species of moth

Naarda flavisignata is a species of moth in the family Noctuidae first described by Vári in 1962.
