= Naarda molybdota =

Scientific classification
- Kingdom: Animalia
- Phylum: Arthropoda
- Class: Insecta
- Order: Lepidoptera
- Superfamily: Noctuoidea
- Family: Erebidae
- Genus: Naarda
- Species: N. molybdota

Binomial name
- Naarda molybdota Hampson, 1912

Species of moth

Naarda molybdota is a species of moth in the family Noctuidae first described by George Hampson in 1912.
