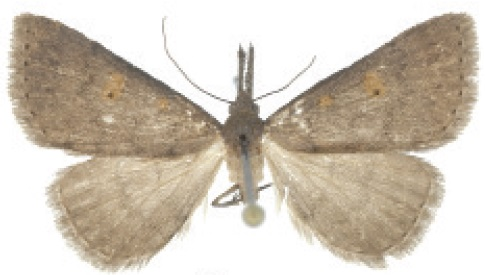
- Female
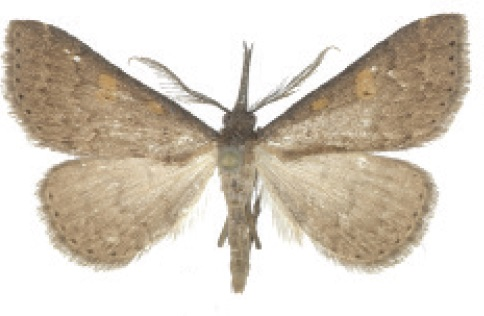
- Male

Scientific classification
- Domain: Eukaryota
- Kingdom: Animalia
- Phylum: Arthropoda
- Class: Insecta
- Order: Lepidoptera
- Superfamily: Noctuoidea
- Family: Erebidae
- Genus: Naarda
- Species: N. egrettoides

Binomial name
- Naarda egrettoides Tóth & Ronkay, 2014

= Naarda egrettoides =

Species of moth

Naarda egrettoides is a species of moth of the family Noctuidae. It was first described by Balázs Tóth and László Aladár Ronkay in 2014. It is found in the mountains of northern Thailand.

The wingspan is 19–22 mm. The characteristic wing pattern features of the species are: The sexes are similar. The ground colour is greyish brown, with parallel subterminal and postmedial lines. The inner part of these lines is dark grey and the outer part is mouse grey. The hindwings are slightly paler than the forewings. The postmedial line is more visible than the subterminal line.

== Etymology ==
The species name refers to the shape of the male genitalia, which are similar to a flying egret and is derived from egrettoides (meaning egret-like).
