= Tamás Pócs =

Hungarian botanist, ecologist, and college professor

- Pócs Tamás
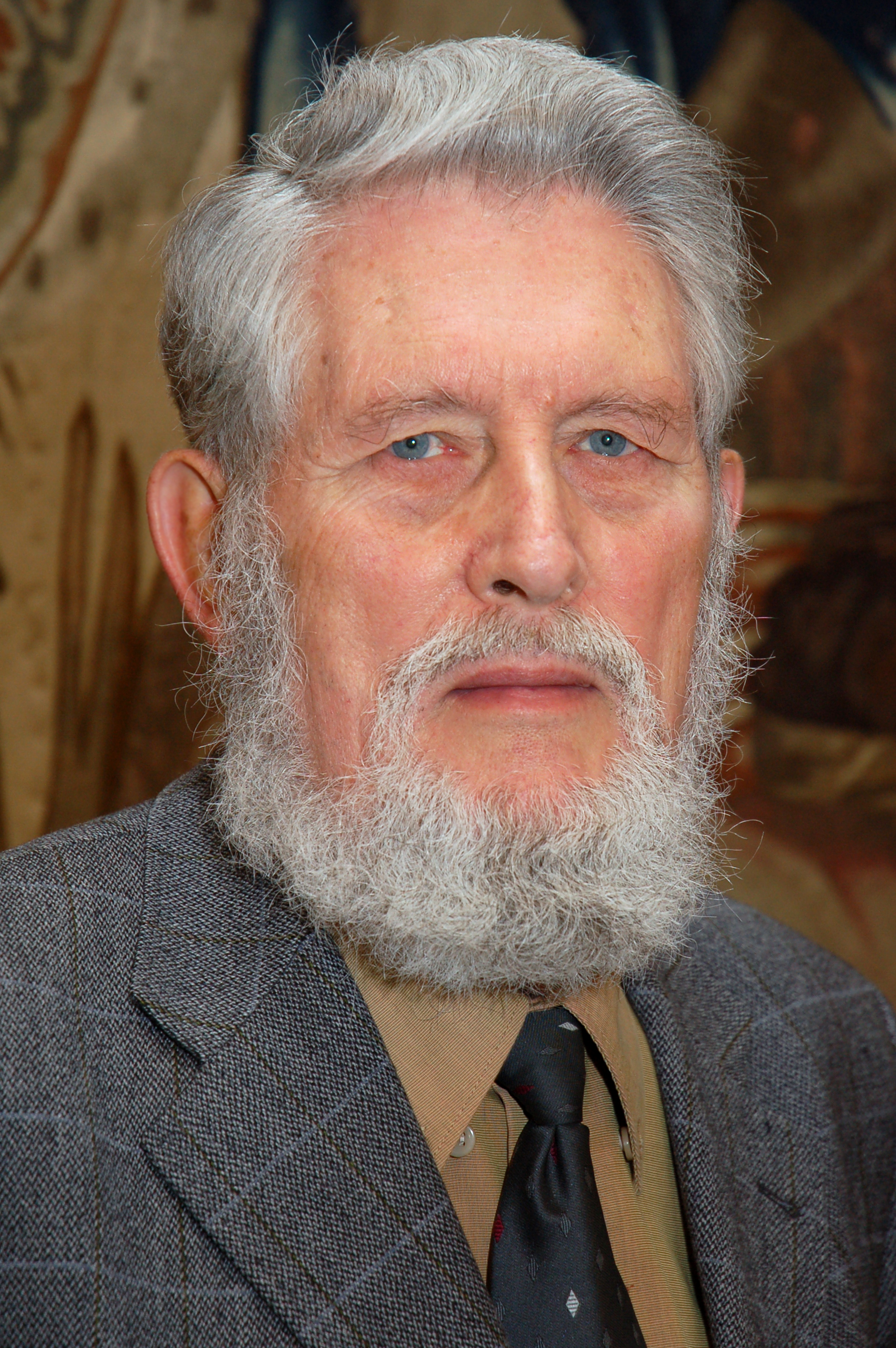
- Pócs at the "Ten years of Wikipedia" conference, 2011
- Born: August 6, 1933 (age 93); Budapest
- Education: Eötvös Loránd University
- Awards: Széchenyi Prize (2014)
- Scientific career
- Fields: Botany, ecology
- Workplaces: Esterhazy Karoly College
- Author abbrev. (botany): Pócs

Tamás Pócs (born 6 August 1933) is a Széchenyi Prize-winning Hungarian botanist, ecologist, and college professor and member of the Hungarian Academy of Sciences. His research interests include the taxonomy and distribution conditions of mosses, tropical ecology, and the flora of southwestern Transdanubia and the Southern Carpathians. He is associated with the collection of many plant specimens and the description of one hundred and forty new plant species. Between 1991 and 1995, he was the president of the Hungarian Biological Society. His great-grandfather Ferenc Kozma (1844–1920) was a teacher, publicist, and academic; his sister Éva Pócs (born 1936) is a folklore researcher.

== Career ==
Tamás Pócs was born in Budapest on 6 August 1933. He attended the Reformation Secondary School, where one of his teachers, the scientist Zoltán Nyárády, encouraged his early interest in botany. This interest developed further in his teens, when he started to collect phanerogamic and cryptogamic plants. Some of his early collections from Bükk, Mátra, Mecsek, South Zala, and Vendvidék are still kept at the Hungarian Natural History Museum. At the age of 15 he became a member of the Hungarian Botanical Society. It was here that he met distinguished botanists, such as Jávorka Sándor, Zólyomi Bálint, and Ujhelyi József, and discussed his botanical findings with them. Pócs attended a course given by lichenologist Ödön Szatala, which heightened his interest in this topic. He graduated in 1951 and then enrolled in the Department of Botany at the Faculty of Science of Eötvös Loránd University, where he obtained a degree in botany in 1956. He was invited by Soó Rezső to work at the Botanical Department after his graduation. He chose instead to accept employment at the herbarium of the Hungarian Natural History Museum in Budapest, where he worked until 1962. During this time, in 1959, he defended his university doctoral dissertation and graduated summa cum laude.

In 1962, he transferred to the teacher training college in Eger, where he began teaching at the Department of Botany, first as an assistant professor and then as an associate professor and college teacher. In 1978 he transferred to the Botanical Research Institute of the Hungarian Academy of Sciences in Vácrátót (starting in 1984, it was called the Ecological and Botanical Research Institute of the Hungarian Academy of Sciences), where he worked as a scientific advisor and later was appointed head of the botany department. In 1983, he was inaugurated as an honorary professor at Eötvös Loránd University. There he taught tropical ecology for several years. He also taught the course Botany of Tropical Cultivated Plants at Hungarian University of Agriculture and Life Science in Gödöllő. In 1991, he returned to Eger, the institution now named Károly Eszterházy College. He became the head of the botanical department and the deputy director general of the college, succeeding Hortobágyi Tibor, who originally founded the department. Pócs headed the department for 18 years. Pócs organized five major research expeditions in ten years as part of his research on the floristic and phytogeographical similarities of East Africa and the Indian Ocean archipelago. These expeditions occurred in Madagascar, the Seychelles, the Comoros, Réunion, Mauritius and the Rogriguez islands, and resulted in the collection of thousands of new specimens for the moss herbarium and the discovery of many new species. He retired in 1996 and then habilitated in the same year. Between 1997 and 2003, he continued to teach as a university professor. In 1999, he was assigned to lead the joint Bryology (Moss Research) Research Group of the Hungarian Academy of Sciences and the college. In 2003, he was awarded the title of professor emeritus. In addition, from 1969 to 1973 and from 1985 to 1989, he was an invited lecturer and visiting professor at the Tanzanian University of Agricultural Sciences in Morogoro. Since 2004, the Collegium Budapest has been conducting theoretical and astrobotanical research in Budapest.

In 1967, Pócs defended his doctoral dissertation in biological sciences, and in 1977, his academic doctoral dissertation. His thesis was titled Komplex vegetációtanulmányok Kelet-Afrikában (Tanzánia, Uluguru hegység) ("Complex vegetation studies in East Africa (Tanzania, Uluguru Mountains)"). He became a member of the Botanical Committee of the Hungarian Academy of Sciences and later joined the Miskolc Regional Committee of the Hungarian Academy of Sciences. In 1995 he was elected a corresponding member of the Hungarian Academy of Sciences, and in 2001 he was elected a full member. In addition, in 1991 the Norwegian Academy of Science and Letters added him to its ranks. He was also a member of the editorial board of Acta Botanica Hungarica. He was chairman of the Hungarian Biological Society from 1991 to 1994 and the chairman of the Botany Committee of the Hungarian Academy of Sciences from 1993 to 1996.

In the late 1970s Pócs and several colleagues developed the idea of establishing an unofficial group of eastern European bryologists to organize meetings and conferences to help organize bryological research in eastern Europe. This was not an easy task, especially for a transnational society, as the ruling Communist Party of each nation had to approve all official societies. Despite this, they were successful in establishing the Central and East European Bryological Working Group, based in Jena. In 1978 Pócs organized the first meeting in Eger, the start of a series of biennial conferences that continued until 1990. After the political changes in Eastern Europe, scientists were free to travel abroad, and these conferences were discontinued because they outlived their original purpose. Pócs was one of the founding members of the International Association of Bryologists, and the vice-president from 1981 to 1987.

== Work ==
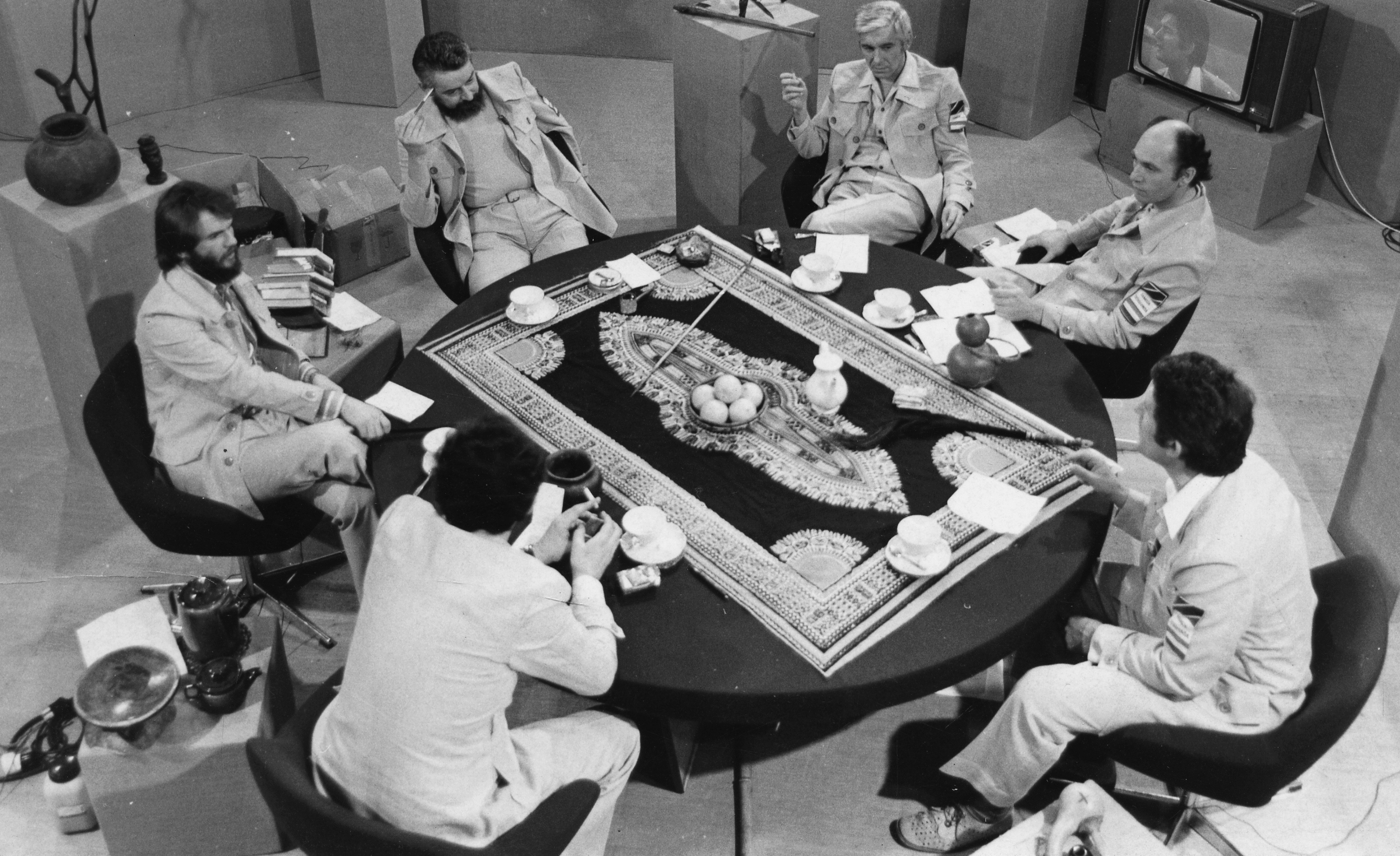
Report on the journey of the Kilimanjaro expedition in the Magyar Televízió studio in Budapest, 1977. Tamás Pócs is seated at the far left.

His main research interests are the taxonomic and distribution conditions of mosses, tropical ecology, the flora of southwestern Transdanubia and the Southern Carpathians, and the forest vegetation of Hungary and tropical Africa. His name is associated with, among other things, several Tanzanian regions, such as the full and complex ecological study and mapping of the vegetation of the Uluguru Mountains. Pócs was the first to show the role of tropical mosses in the spatial and temporal distribution of precipitation water, which is one of his most significant achievements. In later years his research interests turned towards biological soil crusts; in particular, the cyanobacterial members of these communities. He has written about the possibility of simple life forms similar to this colonizing Mars.

Pócs realized at an early age the importance of collecting specimens as an essential component of his research. He prepared many duplicate collections of dried specimens and together with Ryszard Ochyra the exsiccata series Bryophyta Africana selecta, wherein multiple samples of a specimen were collected and then sent to various herbaria around the world, where they are available to a larger scientific community. He collected extensively for herbaria in Budapest, Eger, and Vácrátót in Hungary, and for Dar esSalaam in Tanzania. His first collecting expeditions outside of Hungary were in the Pareng Mountains, Transylvania, in 1955 and 1956. He collected foliicolous (leaf-dwelling) and tropical mosses during a two-month stay in Vietnam in 1963, and a later three-month expedition in 1965–66. In 1969 Pócs won a competitive position as a teacher at the newly established Tanzanian Agricultural University in Morogoro, at the foot of the forested Uluguru Mountains. The subsequent four year-long stay in Tanzania allowed for a substantial specimen collection to be built. Pócs was joined by his wife while in Morogoro, and soon after his newborn son. In 1976 he returned to Africa to assist in the making of the Hungarian television film Kilimanjaro. His expertise was required because he had acquired a detailed knowledge of the hiking paths during his stay there.

During his expeditions, he collected nearly one hundred and thirty thousand plant specimens and managed to describe one hundred and forty new plant species. Antonín Vězda identified many lichen species for him, especially from Tanzania, and he described many new species based on Pócs' collections. Pócs maintained a correspondence with the Norwegian lichenologist Hildur Krog. Her book Macrolichens of East Africa, published with Douglas Swinscow in 1988, used many collections of Pócs. Pócs also has an interest in lichens with special ascomata, like those in the Graphidaceae or Caliciales. In addition to his tropical research, he examined the loess walls of Hungary on the basis of coenological and ecological aspects. He publishes his works in Hungarian, German and English.

Pócs was the first to study the relationship between the epiphytic biomass and precipitation capacity of tropical rainforests, the results of which are among the most cited publications today. To summarize, it has been shown by quantitative methods that the biomass of epiphytic cover crops (moss, lichen, fern, other plants) living in the tree can reach 14 tons per hectare in this type of vegetation, which can absorb 50,000 liters of water per four times its dry matter, and be gradually transferred to its environment. This is much more than the amount of water bound by the entire foliage (6000 liters). Furthermore, his research showed that epiphytes retain significant amounts of water from the regular fog precipitation in the cloud zone. Similar studies have since been conducted on other continents, with similar results.

== Family ==
One of his maternal grandfathers, Ferenc Kozma (1844–1920), was a teacher, publicist and academic. His sister Éva Pócs is a folklore researcher and university professor, who was previously the wife of Zsolt Csalog, a sociologist and gypsy researcher. His wife is Sarolta Czímer, a laboratory assistant at the Károly Eszterházy College. From their marriage, two sons (Zoltán Ábel and Bence) and a daughter (Rita Kata) were born. From his previous marriage a son was born, Tamás Pócs, Jr..

His colleague Jiří Váňa described him as "an open-hearted, generous man, a disciplined, energetic researcher, and a scientist of the highest caliber".

== Awards and recognition ==
- Academic Award (1980)
- Teleki Samuel Medal
- Szent-Györgyi Albert-díj (1996)
- Pro Natura díj (2001)
- Leo Szilárd Professor Scholarship (2003)
- Officer's Cross of the Order of Merit of the Republic of Hungary (2010)
- Hedwig Medal from the International Association of Bryologists for lifetime achievements in bryology
- Széchenyi Prize (2014)

A Festschrift in the Polish Botanical Journal was dedicated to him in 2013, on the occasion of his 80th birthday.

From 1975 to 2014, 14 taxa (including 1 genus) of lichen-forming fungi were named in honour of Pócs. Antonin Vězda published Pocsia (the fungi) in 1975 in his honour, it was later classified as a synonym of Phylloblastia. Pocsiella is a moss in Dicranaceae family that was published by Maurice Louis Jean Bizot in 1980. The moth Naarda pocstamasi, and the moss Neckeropsis pocsii are two of many examples of eponyms.

== Selected publications ==
Pócs published his first scientific paper in 1954, while still a first-year student at university; his first book (co-authored) was published a year later. A comprehensive listing of Pócs' scientific works from 1954 to 2015 can be found in Wallner and Biernaczky's 2016 publication. This list includes 33 scientific books or book chapters. Some representative works include:

- Pócs, T.; Domokosné Nagy, E.; Pócsné Gelencsér, I.; Vida, G. (1958). Vegetationsstudien im Örség (Ungarisches Ostalpenvorland). Die Vegetation ungarischer Landschaften, 2. (in German). Budapest: Akadémiai Kiadó. pp. 1–124. OCLC 1202113307.
- Pócs, Tamás (1980). "The Epiphytic Biomass and its Effect on the Water Balance of Two Rain Forest Types in the Uluguru Mountains (Tanzania, East Africa)". Acta Botanica Academiae Scientiarum Hungaricae. 26 (1–2): 143–167.
- Pócs, Tamás (1982). "Tropical forest bryophytes". In Smith, A. (ed.). Bryophyte Ecology. Springer Netherlands. pp. 59–104. doi:10.1007/978-94-009-5891-3_3. ISBN 978-94-009-5893-7.
- Pócs, Tamás (1984). "New or little known epiphyllous liverworts, III. The genus Aphanolejeunea Evans in tropical Africa". Cryptogamie. Bryologie, lichénologie. 5 (3): 239–267.
- Pócs, T. (1994). "The altitudinal distribution of Kilimanjaro bryophytes". In Seyani, J.H.; Chikuni, A.C. (eds.). Proceedings of the XIIIth Plenary Meeting of AETFAT, Zomba, Malawi, 2-11 April 1991. Zomba, Malawi: National Herbarium and Botanic Gardens of Malawi. pp. 797–812.
- Pócs, Tamás (1996). "Epiphyllous liverwort diversity at worldwide level and its threat and conservation". Anales del Instituto de Biológia de la Universidad Nacional Autónoma de México. Série botánica. 67 (1): 109–127.
- Pócs, Tamás (1999). "A löszfalak virágtalan növényzete I. Orografikus ivatag a Kárpát-medencében" (PDF). Kitaibelia. 4 (1): 143–156.
- Pócs, Tamás (1999). "Bryophyte speciation and diversity in the East African mountains". Bryobrothera. 5: 237–245.
- Tan, Benito C.; Pócs, Tamás (2000). "Bryogeography and conservation of bryophytes". In Shaw, A. Jonathan; Goffinet, Bernard (eds.). Bryophyte Biology. Cambridge: Cambridge University Press. pp. 403–448. ISBN 978-0-521-66097-6.
- Szathmáry, Eörs; Gánti, Tibor; Pócs, Tamás; Horváth, András; Kereszturi, Ákos; Bérczi, Szaniszló; Sik, András; Pudritz, Ralph; Higgs, Paul; Stone, Jonathon (2007). "Life in the dark dune spots of Mars: a testable hypothesis". In Pudritz, Ralph; Higgs, Paul; Stone, Jonathon (eds.). Planetary Systems and the Origins of Life. Cambridge University Press. pp. 241–262. doi:10.1017/CBO9780511536120.014. ISBN 978-0-511-53612-0.
- Pócs, Tamás; Sass-Gyarmati, Andrea (2007). Az Erdélyi szigethegység virágai 1. Florile din Munţii Apuseni [Flowers of the Romanian Western Carpathians]. Eger: self-published. ISBN 978-963-06-1791-8.

== See also ==
- Category:Taxa named by Tamás Pócs
