= Naarda postpallida =

Scientific classification
- Domain: Eukaryota
- Kingdom: Animalia
- Phylum: Arthropoda
- Class: Insecta
- Order: Lepidoptera
- Superfamily: Noctuoidea
- Family: Erebidae
- Genus: Naarda
- Species: N. postpallida

Binomial name
- Naarda postpallida de Joannis, 1929

Species of moth

Naarda postpallida is a species of moth in the family Noctuidae first described by Joseph de Joannis in 1929.
