= Naarda symethusalis =

Scientific classification
- Kingdom: Animalia
- Phylum: Arthropoda
- Class: Insecta
- Order: Lepidoptera
- Superfamily: Noctuoidea
- Family: Erebidae
- Genus: Naarda
- Species: N. symethusalis

Binomial name
- Naarda symethusalis Walker, 1859

Species of moth

Naarda symethusalis is a species of moth in the family Noctuidae first described by Francis Walker in 1859.
