= Naarda glauculalis =

Scientific classification
- Kingdom: Animalia
- Phylum: Arthropoda
- Class: Insecta
- Order: Lepidoptera
- Superfamily: Noctuoidea
- Family: Erebidae
- Genus: Naarda
- Species: N. glauculalis

Binomial name
- Naarda glauculalis (Hampson, 1893)

Species of moth

Naarda glauculalis is a type of moth in the family Noctuidae first described by George Hampson in 1893.

== Description ==
Its wingspan is 22 mm. Palpi short and porrect (extending forward), where the second joint thickened by being clothed with very long on upperside so as almost to hide the third joint. Antennae of male with long cilia. Male has small ochreous spot at end of cell of forewing. The postmedial line found far from the cell. Hindwings without antemedial and postmedial lines.
