= Naarda blepharota =

Scientific classification
- Domain: Eukaryota
- Kingdom: Animalia
- Phylum: Arthropoda
- Class: Insecta
- Order: Lepidoptera
- Superfamily: Noctuoidea
- Family: Erebidae
- Genus: Naarda
- Species: N. blepharota

Binomial name
- Naarda blepharota Strand, 1920

Species of moth

Naarda blepharota is a type of moth in the family Noctuidae first described by Strand in 1920.
