= Naarda ochreistigma =

Scientific classification
- Kingdom: Animalia
- Phylum: Arthropoda
- Class: Insecta
- Order: Lepidoptera
- Superfamily: Noctuoidea
- Family: Erebidae
- Genus: Naarda
- Species: N. ochreistigma

Binomial name
- Naarda ochreistigma Hampson, 1893

Species of moth

Naarda ochreistigma is a species of moth in the family Noctuidae first described by George Hampson in 1893.
