= Naarda clitodes =

Scientific classification
- Domain: Eukaryota
- Kingdom: Animalia
- Phylum: Arthropoda
- Class: Insecta
- Order: Lepidoptera
- Superfamily: Noctuoidea
- Family: Erebidae
- Genus: Naarda
- Species: N. clitodes

Binomial name
- Naarda clitodes D. S. Fletcher, 1961

Species of insect

Naarda clitodes is a type of moth in the family Erebidae. It was described by David Stephen Fletcher in 1961.

This species is known from Uganda.
