= Phylloblastia verheyeniana =

Scientific classification
- Kingdom: Fungi
- Division: Ascomycota
- Class: Eurotiomycetes
- Order: Verrucariales
- Family: Verrucariaceae
- Genus: Phylloblastia
- Species: P. verheyeniana

Binomial name
- Phylloblastia verheyeniana Van den Broeck, Lücking & Ertz (2014)

Species of lichen

Phylloblastia verheyeniana is a species of foliicolous (leaf-dwelling) lichen in the family Verrucariaceae. Found in the Democratic Republic of the Congo, it was formally described as a new species in 2014 by Dries Van den Broeck, Robert Lücking, and Damien Ertz. The type specimen was collected by the first author at the Lomami River (Yaengo, Orientale Province) at an altitude of 487 m (1,598 ft). It is only known to occur in the Congo Basin, where it grows on the leaves of understory plants and shrubs. The species epithet honours Museum of Natural Sciences of Belgium zoologist Erik Verheyen.

The lichen has a smooth, crustose, green thallus that lacks isidia. The photobiont partner is green, and present as angular to rounded cells measuring 5–10 by 5–6 μm; they occur in radiating plates or in irregular groups. The fruiting structures are in the form of orange to yellow perithecia measuring 110–150 μm in diameter and 150 μm high. Ascospores, which number eight per ascus, are colourless, spindle-shaped (fusiform), and typically measure 13–15 by 3.0–4.5 μm. Phylloblastia borhidii is similar in morphology, but that species does have isidia and has larger and wider spores.
