= Naarda atrirena =

Scientific classification
- Kingdom: Animalia
- Phylum: Arthropoda
- Class: Insecta
- Order: Lepidoptera
- Superfamily: Noctuoidea
- Family: Erebidae
- Genus: Naarda
- Species: N. atrirena

Binomial name
- Naarda atrirena Hampson, 1912

Species of moth

Naarda atrirena is a species of moth in the family Noctuidae first described by George Hampson in 1912.
