= Naarda ochronota =

Scientific classification
- Domain: Eukaryota
- Kingdom: Animalia
- Phylum: Arthropoda
- Class: Insecta
- Order: Lepidoptera
- Superfamily: Noctuoidea
- Family: Erebidae
- Genus: Naarda
- Species: N. ochronota

Binomial name
- Naarda ochronota Wileman, 1915

Species of moth

Naarda ochronota is a species of moth in the family Noctuidae first described by Wileman in 1915.
