= Naarda nodariodes =

Scientific classification
- Kingdom: Animalia
- Phylum: Arthropoda
- Clade: Pancrustacea
- Class: Insecta
- Order: Lepidoptera
- Superfamily: Noctuoidea
- Family: Erebidae
- Genus: Naarda
- Species: N. nodariodes

Binomial name
- Naarda nodariodes Prout, 1928

Species of moth

Naarda nodariodes is a species of moth in the family Erebidae first described by Prout in 1928. It is known from Borneo.
