= Naarda fuliginaria =

Scientific classification
- Kingdom: Animalia
- Phylum: Arthropoda
- Class: Insecta
- Order: Lepidoptera
- Superfamily: Noctuoidea
- Family: Erebidae
- Genus: Naarda
- Species: N. fuliginaria

Binomial name
- Naarda fuliginaria Bethune-Baker, 1911

Species of moth

Naarda fuliginaria is a moth in the family Noctuidae. This species was first described by George Thomas Bethune-Baker in 1911.
