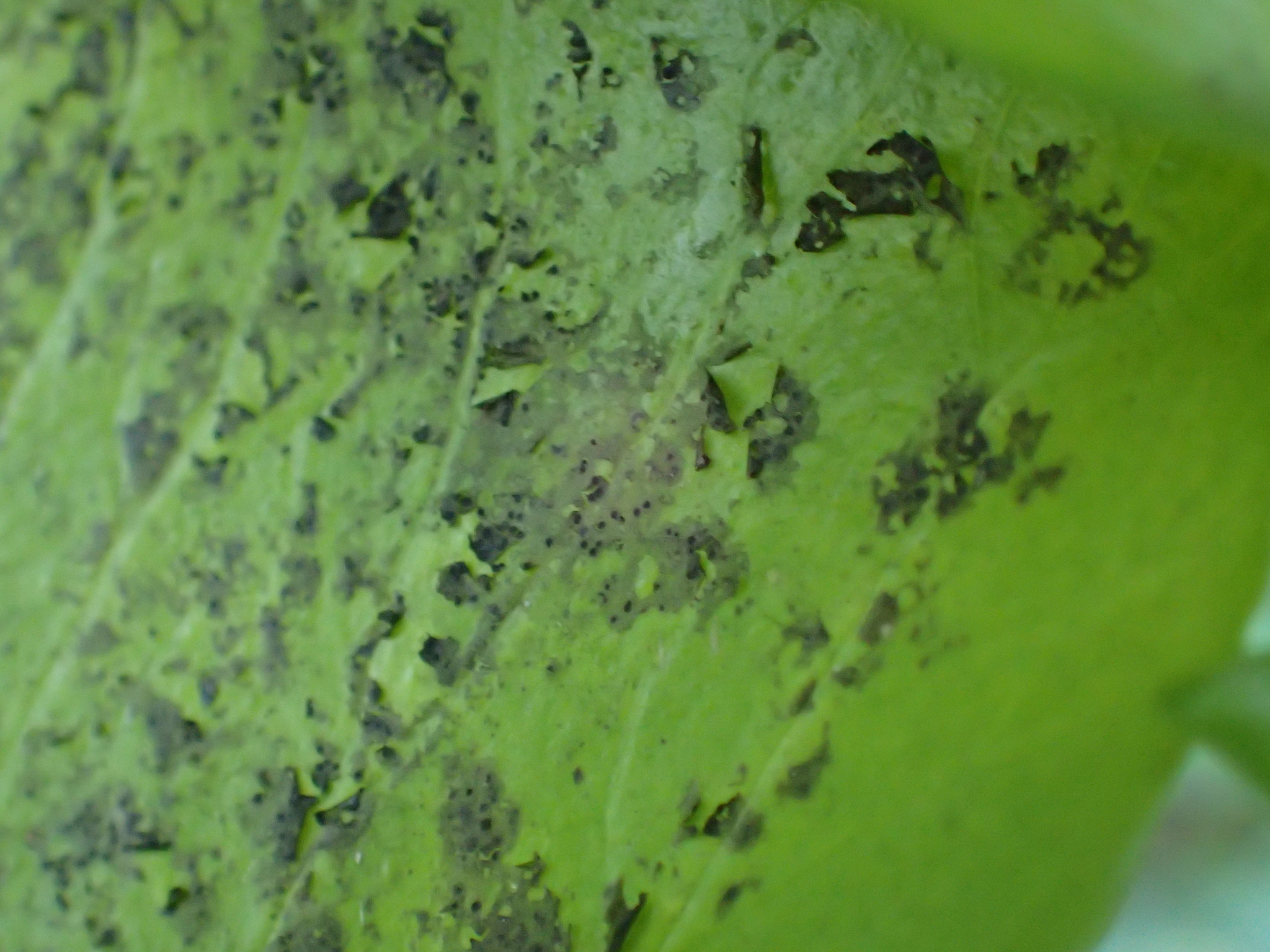
- Phylloblastia fortuita on Hedera helix

Scientific classification
- Domain: Eukaryota
- Kingdom: Fungi
- Division: Ascomycota
- Class: Eurotiomycetes
- Order: Verrucariales
- Family: Verrucariaceae
- Genus: Phylloblastia; Vain. (1921)

Type species
- Phylloblastia dolichospora Vain. (1921)

Synonyms
- Pocsia Vězda (1975)

= Phylloblastia =

Genus of lichens

Phylloblastia is a genus of foliicolous (leaf-dwelling) lichens in the family Verrucariaceae. The genus was circumscribed in 1921 by Finnish lichenologist Edvard August Vainio, with Phylloblastia dolichospora assigned as the type species.

== Description ==
Genus Phylloblastia comprises crustose lichens with sometimes very tiny, scale-like formations. The cortex of these lichens is either absent or very thin, structured in a paraplectenchymatous manner. In species found outside of Europe, disc-shaped to shield-like isidia are often observed. The photobiont component is typically chlorococcoid, featuring green algal cells that are angular-rounded and grouped irregularly or in clusters.

The ascomata, or spore-producing structures, are perithecia, which means they are sessile (not on a stalk) and range from hemispherical to almost spherical in shape. These structures have colours from pale orange to black. While paraphyses (sterile filaments within the ascomata) are absent, periphyses (hair-like structures at the mouth of the perithecia) are usually present. The asci (spore-bearing cells) have a fissitunicate structure, meaning they have a double wall that splits to release spores.

Typically, there are eight ascospores per ascus. These spores are oblong to cylindrical in shape, with transverse or muriform (divided in all three dimensions) septation, but without constrictions at the septa, and are colourless. The genus does not show the presence of conidiomata (asexual reproductive structures). Chemical analysis using thin-layer chromatography has not detected any specific secondary metabolites (lichen products) in these lichens.

== Species ==
- Phylloblastia alvaroi (Herrera-Camp. & Lücking) Lücking (2008)
- Phylloblastia bielczykiae Flakus & Lücking (2008) – Bolivia
- Phylloblastia blechnicola P.M.McCarthy & Stajsic (2013) – Australia
- Phylloblastia borhidii (Farkas & Vězda) Lücking (2008) – Tanzania
- Phylloblastia dispersa (Vězda) Lücking (2008)
- Phylloblastia dolichospora Vain. (1921)
- Phylloblastia excavata P.M.McCarthy (2010) – Australia
- Phylloblastia fortuita Llop & Gómez-Bolea (2009) – Europe
- Phylloblastia inconspicua Lücking (2008) – Central America
- Phylloblastia inexpectata Sérus., Coppins & Lücking (2007) – Europe
- Phylloblastia iranica S.Kazemi, Lücking & Sipman (2024) – Iran
- Phylloblastia marattiae (Vězda) Lücking (2008)
- Phylloblastia mucronata (P.M.McCarthy) Lücking (2008)
- Phylloblastia pocsii (Farkas & Vězda) Lücking (2008)
- Phylloblastia septemseptata (Vězda) Lücking (2008)
- Phylloblastia triseptata (Kalb & Vězda) Lücking (2008)
- Phylloblastia verheyeniana Van den Broeck, Lücking & Ertz (2014) – Democratic Republic of the Congo
