= Naarda umbria =

Scientific classification
- Kingdom: Animalia
- Phylum: Arthropoda
- Class: Insecta
- Order: Lepidoptera
- Superfamily: Noctuoidea
- Family: Erebidae
- Genus: Naarda
- Species: N. umbria

Binomial name
- Naarda umbria Hampson, 1902

Species of moth

Naarda umbria is a species of moth in the family Noctuidae.
