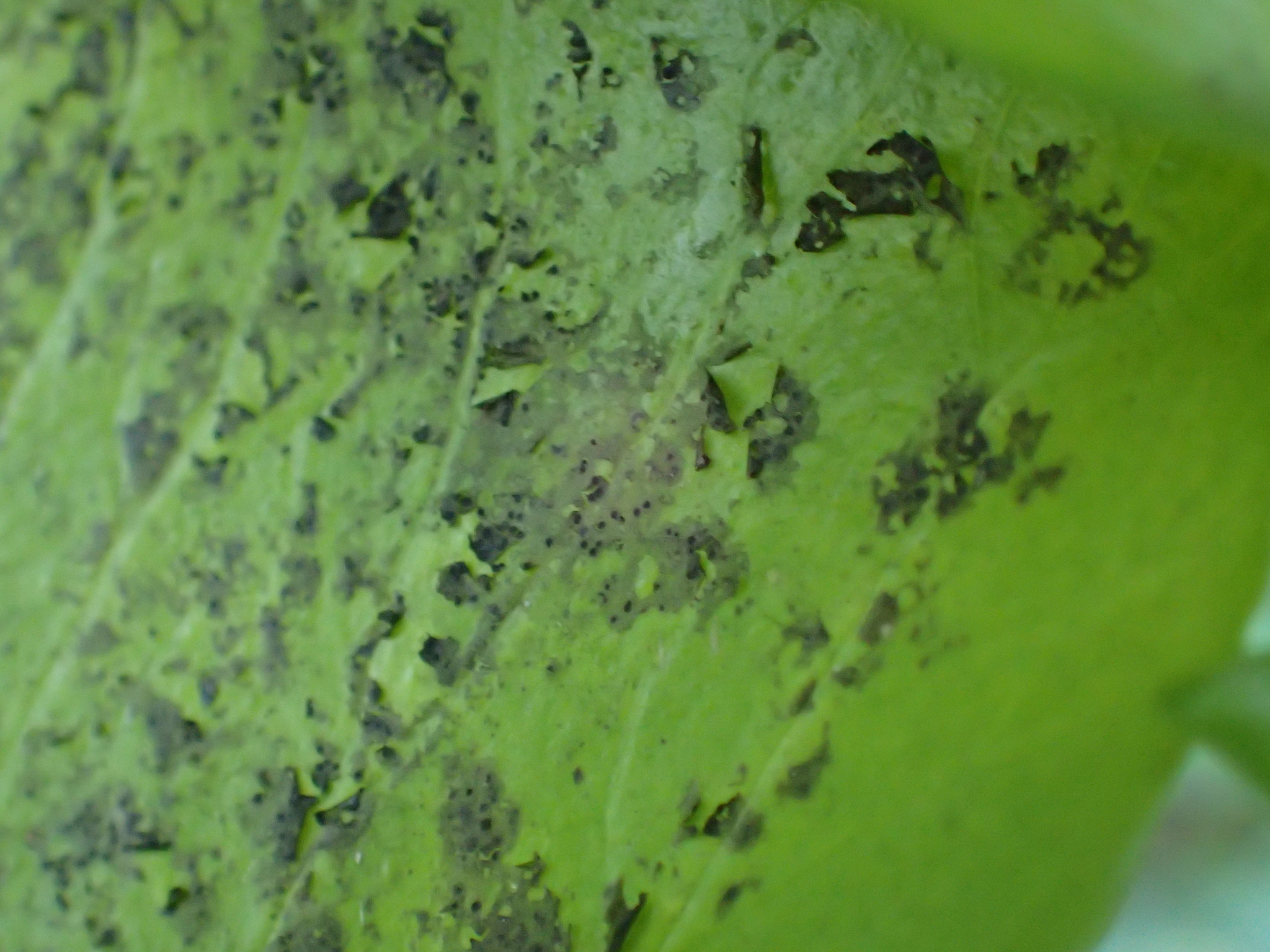
- On Hedera helix

Scientific classification
- Domain: Eukaryota
- Kingdom: Fungi
- Division: Ascomycota
- Class: Eurotiomycetes
- Order: Verrucariales
- Family: Verrucariaceae
- Genus: Phylloblastia
- Species: P. fortuita

Binomial name
- Phylloblastia fortuita Llop & Gómez-Bolea (2009)

= Phylloblastia fortuita =

Species of lichen

Phylloblastia fortuita is a species of foliicolous (leaf-dwelling) lichen in the family Verrucariaceae. Found in Western Europe and North America, it was formally described as a new species in 2009 by Esteve Llop and Antonio Gómez-Bolea. The type specimen was collected from Sant Medir (Sant Cugat del Vallès, Barcelona) at an altitude of 220 m (720 ft), where it was found growing on the leaves of Ilex aquifolium. The lichen, originally documented as occurring in the Mediterranean climate of the Iberian Peninsula, was reported from Marin County, California, in 2016. Other plants from which it has been documented include Buxus sempervirens, Hedera helix, Quercus ilex, and, in North America, Sequoia sempervirens.

== Description ==
The thallus (the main body of the lichen) of Phylloblastia fortuita appears scattered across leaf surfaces, forming a thin, diffuse, cobweb-like structure with a greenish-grey colouration. The thallus develops more prominently around reproductive structures and consists of clear (hyaline), interwoven fungal threads (hyphae) measuring 3-4 micrometers in thickness. The photobiont (the algal partner in the lichen symbiosis) is chlorococcoid, with algal cells 6–10 micrometres in diameter that form irregular to rounded clusters surrounded by fungal hyphae.

The reproductive structures (perithecia) are sessile (attached directly to the surface without stalks), more or less spherical to hemispherical in shape, with flattened or depressed tops. These measure 0.1–0.2 mm in diameter (occasionally reaching 0.24 mm) and up to 0.1 mm in height, with colouration ranging from greyish brown to dark brown and featuring a felt-like outer surface texture. The perithecia lack an involucrellum (a protective covering structure).

The excipulum (the protective layer surrounding the reproductive tissues) measures 18–32 micrometers thick, with two distinct layers. The outer layer resembles a textura globularis (a tissue of spherical cells) with an olivaceous-brown colour, while the inner layer consists of compressed, elongated cells in a paraplectenchymatous arrangement forming a textura angularis (angular tissue). While paraphyses (sterile filaments) are absent, periphyses (sterile hair-like structures) are consistently present, appearing colourless with a basal layer of roughly equal-diameter cells and 1–2 oblong apical cells.

The asci (spore-producing structures) are club to egg-shaped, each containing 8 spores, measuring 40–60 by 15–20 (sometimes 25) μm, with slightly thickened tips that do not react with iodine stain (I-). The ascospores (fungal spores) are ellipsoid to fusiform with rounded ends, straight to slightly curved, with a somewhat muriform structure (divided by both transverse and longitudinal walls). They typically have 5–9 transverse septa (partitions) and 1–6 longitudinal septa, except in the end cells, with slight constrictions at the septa. They typically measure 20–35 by 5–9 μm, being 3–5 times longer than wide. No pycnidia (asexual reproductive structures) have been observed in this species.
