= List of moths of India (Erebidae) =

This is a list of moths of the family Erebidae that are found in India. It also acts as an index to the species and forms part of the full List of moths of India.

== Subfamily Acontiinae ==
- Acontia marmoralis (Fabricius, 1794)

== Subfamily Arctiinae ==
- Creatonotos gangis (Linnaeus, 1763)
- Creatonotos transiens (Walker, 1855)
- Spilarctia bifascia (Hampson, 1891)
- Spilarctia casigneta (Kollar, 1844)
- Spilarctia castanea (Hampson, 1893)
- Spilarctia coorgensis Kirti & Gill, 2010
- Spilarctia lutea (Hufnagel, 1766)
- Spilarctia mona (Swinhoe, 1885)
- Spilarctia obliqua (Walker, 1855)
- Spilarctia todara (Moore, 1872)

== Subfamily Boletobiinae ==
- Araeopteron fasciale (Hampson, 1896)
- Araeopteron goniophora Hampson, 1907
- Araeopteron griseata Hampson, 1907
- Araeopteron nivalis (Hampson, 1907)
- Araeopteron pictale Hampson, 1893
- Araeopteron poliophaea (Hampson, 1910)
- Araeopteron proleuca Hampson, 1907
- Araeopteron rufescens (Hampson, 1910)
- Araeopteron xanthopis (Hampson, 1907)
- Cretonia vegetus (Swinhoe, 1885)
- Lophoruza lunifera (Moore, [1885] 1884–1887)
- Metaemene atriguttata (Walker, 1862)
- Zurobata vacillans (Walker, 1864)

== Subfamily Herminiinae ==
- Bertula partita Hampson, 1891
- Hydrillodes abavalis (Walker, [1859] 1858)
- Hydrillodes hemusalis (Walker, [1859] 1858)
- Hydrillodes lentalis Guenée, 1854
- Mixomelia albapex (Hampson, 1895)
- Mixomelia duplexa (Moore, 1882)
- Mixomelia relata (Hampson, 1891)
- Naarda calligrapha Tóth & Ronkay, 2015
- Naarda fuscicosta (Hampson, 1891)
- Naarda inouei Tóth & Ronkay, 2015
- Naarda molybdota (Hampson, 1912)
- Naarda numismata Tóth & Ronkay, 2015
- Nodaria externalis Guenée, 1854
- Nodaria fusca Hampson, 1895
- Nodaria simplex Hampson, 1898
- Polypogon fractalis (Guenée, 1854)
- Simplicia butesalis (Walker, 1858)
- Simplicia mistacalis Guenée, 1854
- Simplicia niphona (Butler, 1878)
- Simplicia robustalis (Guenée, 1854)
- Simplicia xanthoma Prout, 1928

== Subfamily Hypeninae ==
- Acidon albolineata (Hampson, 1895)
- Acidon evae Lödl, 1998
- Acidon hemiphaea (Hampson 1906)
- Acidon nigribasis (Hampson, 1895)
- Acidon steniptera (Hampson, 1902)
- Acidon rectilineata (Hampson, 1896)
- Anoratha paritalis (Walker, [1859] 1858)
- Catada bipartita (Moore, 1882)
- Hiaspis fuscobrunnea (Hampson, 1895)
- Hypena albisigna Moore, 1882
- Hypena ciaridoides Moore, 1882
- Hypena iconicalis Walker, [1859] 1858
- Hypena indicatalis Walker, [1859] 1858
- Hypena labatalis Walker, [1859] 1858
- Hypena laceratalis Walker, [1859] 1858
- Hypena nocturnalis Swinhoe, 1896
- Hypena occatus Hampson, 1882
- Hypena ophiusoides Moore, 1882
- Hypena rhombalis Guenée, 1854
- Hypena thermesialis Walker, [1866] 1865
- Itmaharela basalis Moore, 1882
- Lysimelia alstoni Holloway, 1979
- Lysimelia neleusalis Walker, [1859] 1858
- Sarobela litterata (Pagenstecher, 1888)
- Rhynchina obliqualis (Kollar, 1844)

== Subfamily Rivulinae ==
- Rivula basalis Hampson, 1891
- Rivula bioculalis Moore, 1877
- Rivula curvifera (Walker, 1862)
- Rivula niveipuncta Swinhoe, 1905
- Rivula ochracea (Moore, 1882)
- Rivula pallida Moore, 1882
- Rivula striatura Swinhoe, 1895
