= Hydrillodes aviculalis =

Scientific classification
- Kingdom: Animalia
- Phylum: Arthropoda
- Class: Insecta
- Order: Lepidoptera
- Superfamily: Noctuoidea
- Family: Erebidae
- Genus: Hydrillodes
- Species: H. aviculalis

Binomial name
- Hydrillodes aviculalis Guenée, 1862

Synonyms
- Bleptinodes borbonica de Joannis, 1932

Species of moth

Hydrillodes aviculalis is a species of litter moth of the family Erebidae described by Achille Guenée in 1862. This species is known only from Réunion where it is found at elevations above 500 m in primary forests.

This species has the same sexual dimorphism as Hydrillodes uliginosalis: the females are brown to dark brown, the males are very dark coloured, almost black. The clearer form had been described in 1932 by Joseph de Joannis as Bleptinodes borbonica that had been synonymised only in 2005 by Christian Guillermet.
