= Araeopteron obliquifascia =

Scientific classification
- Domain: Eukaryota
- Kingdom: Animalia
- Phylum: Arthropoda
- Class: Insecta
- Order: Lepidoptera
- Superfamily: Noctuoidea
- Family: Erebidae
- Genus: Araeopteron
- Species: A. obliquifascia

Binomial name
- Araeopteron obliquifascia (de Joannis, 1910)

Synonyms
- Araeoptera obliquifascia de Joannis, 1910

Species of moth

Araeopteron obliquifascia is a species of moth of the family Erebidae. It is found on Mauritius and Réunion.

Its wingspan is 11 mm.
