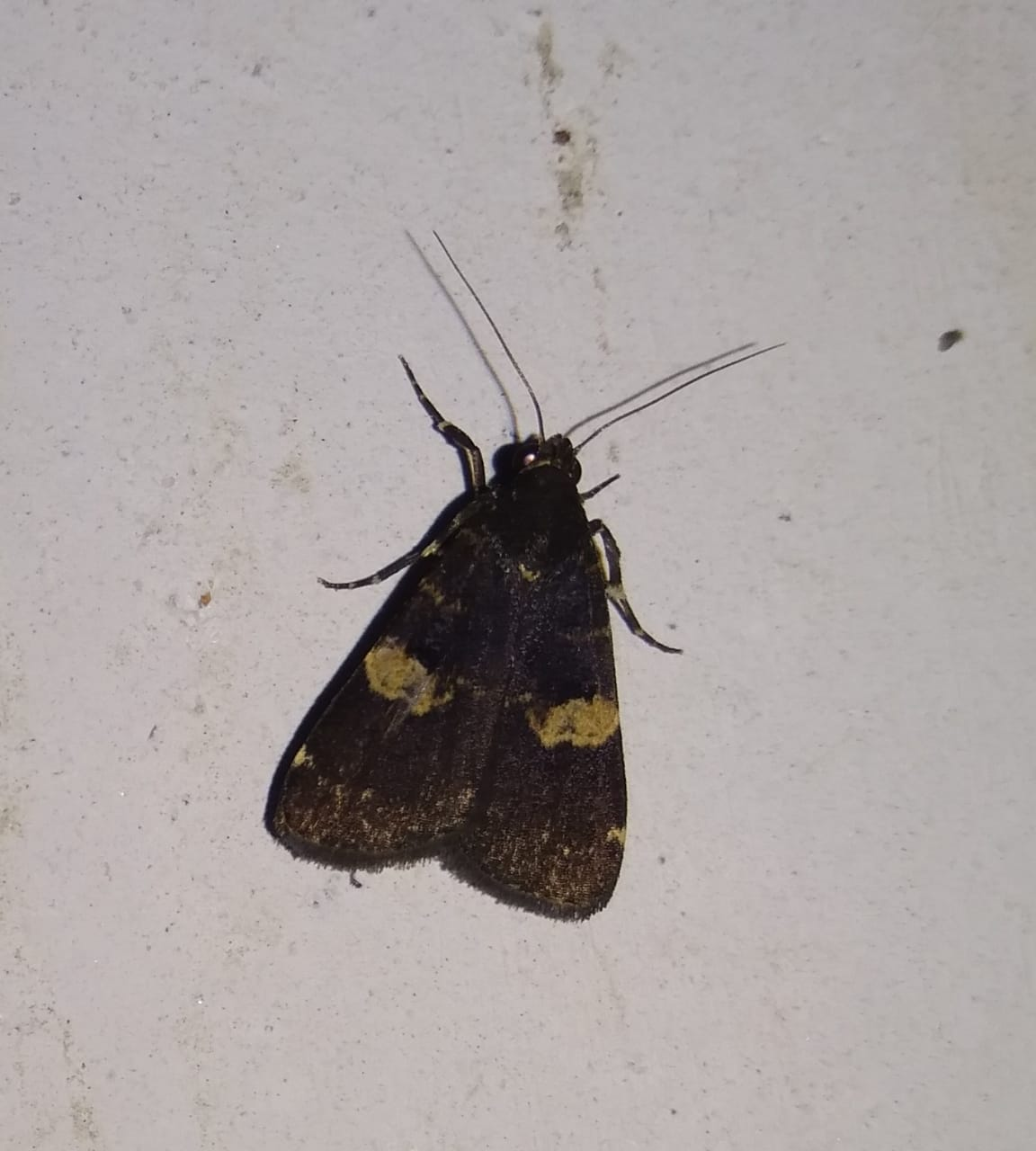

Scientific classification
- Kingdom: Animalia
- Phylum: Arthropoda
- Class: Insecta
- Order: Lepidoptera
- Superfamily: Noctuoidea
- Family: Erebidae
- Genus: Hydrillodes
- Species: H. gravatalis

Binomial name
- Hydrillodes gravatalis (Walker, [1859])

Synonyms
- Ragana gravatalis Walker, 1859; Bocana gravatalis Walker, [1859] 1858; Bocana erythusalis Walker, [1859] 1858

= Hydrillodes gravatalis =

Species of moth

Hydrillodes gravatalis is a moth of the family Erebidae first described by Francis Walker in 1859. It is found in the Indian subregion, Sri Lanka and Sundaland.

Forewings blackish brown. Punctate submarginals are straw white. Caterpillars feed on detritus and pericarp of Shorea and Dipterocarpus species.

== Gallery ==
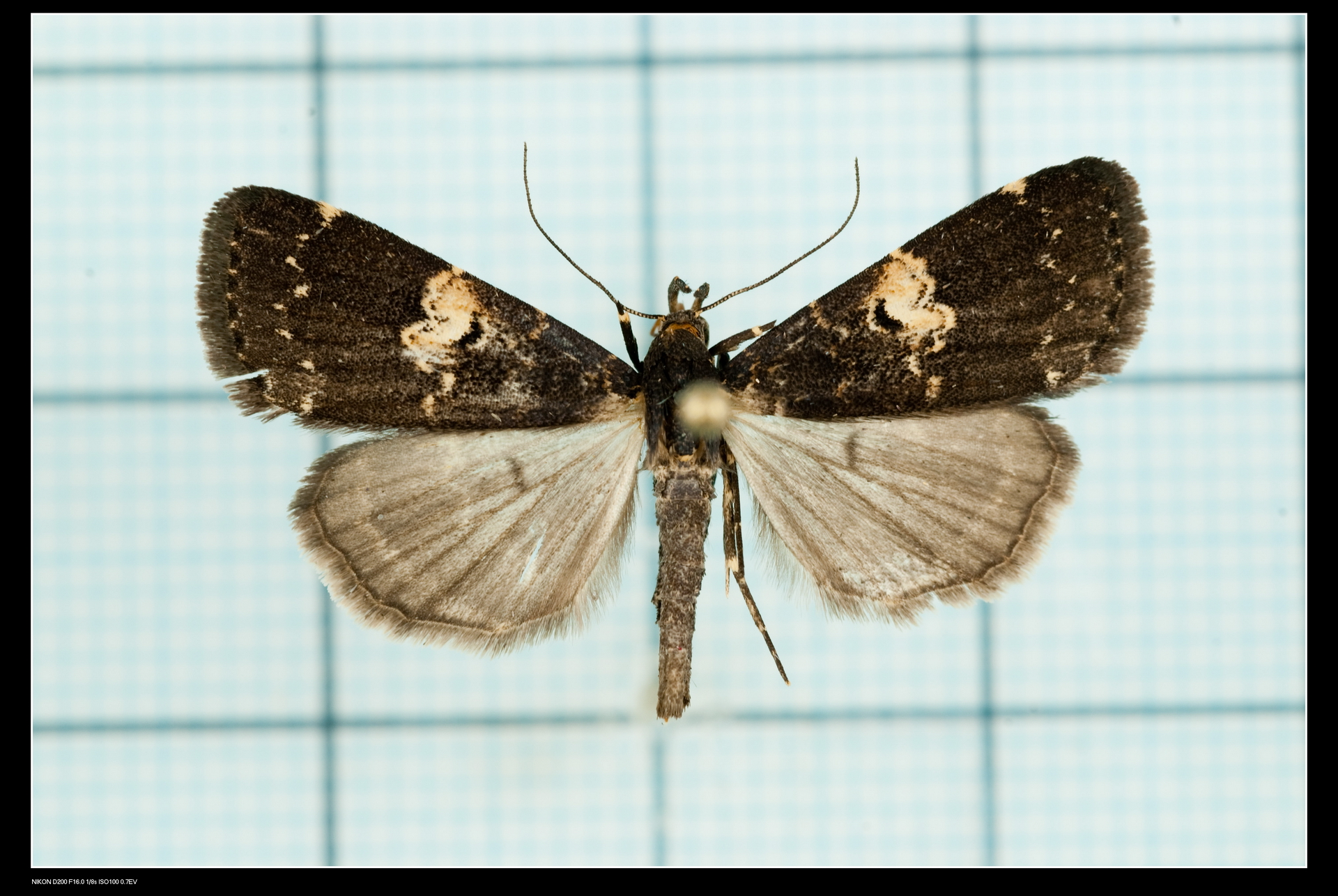

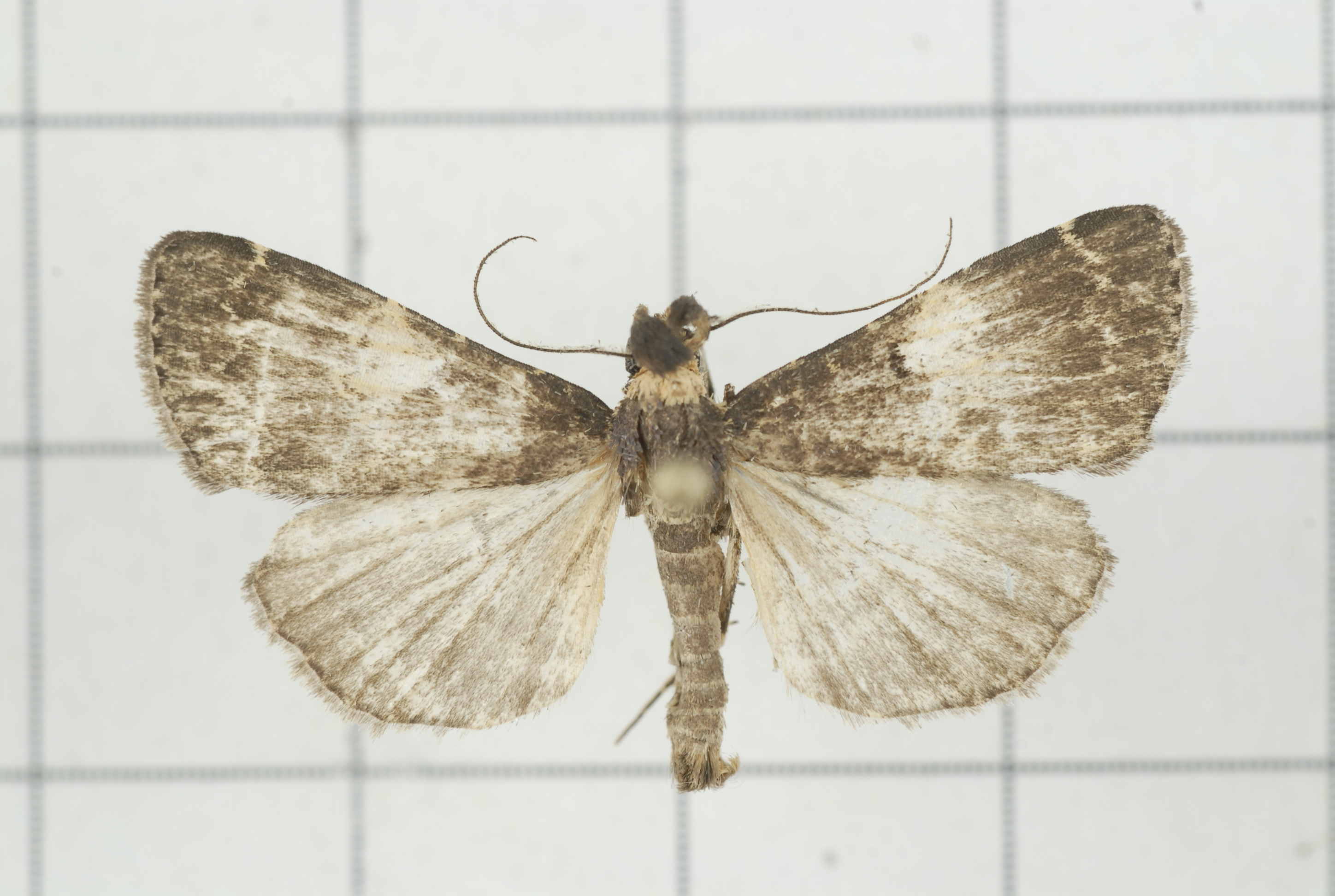

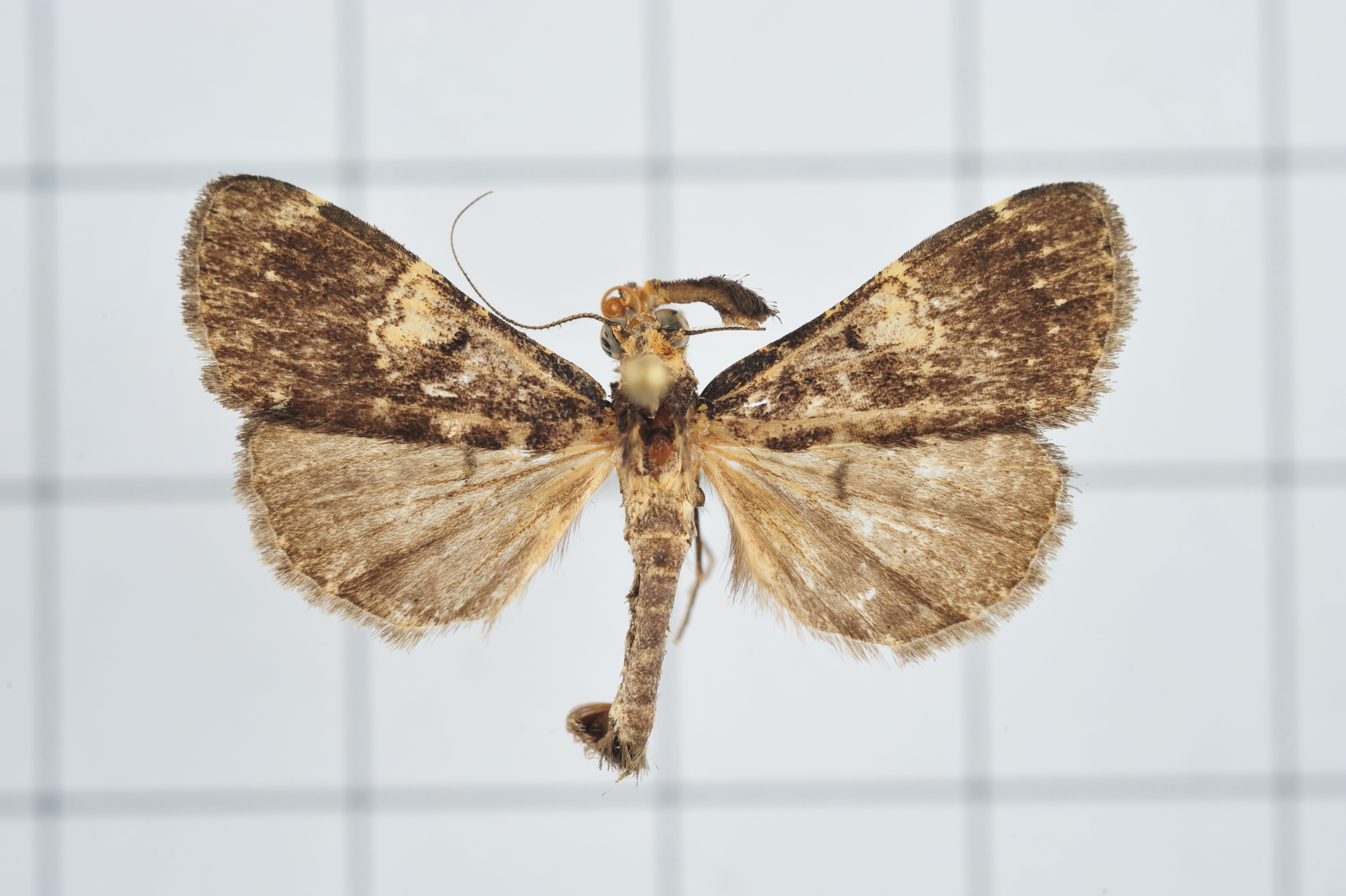

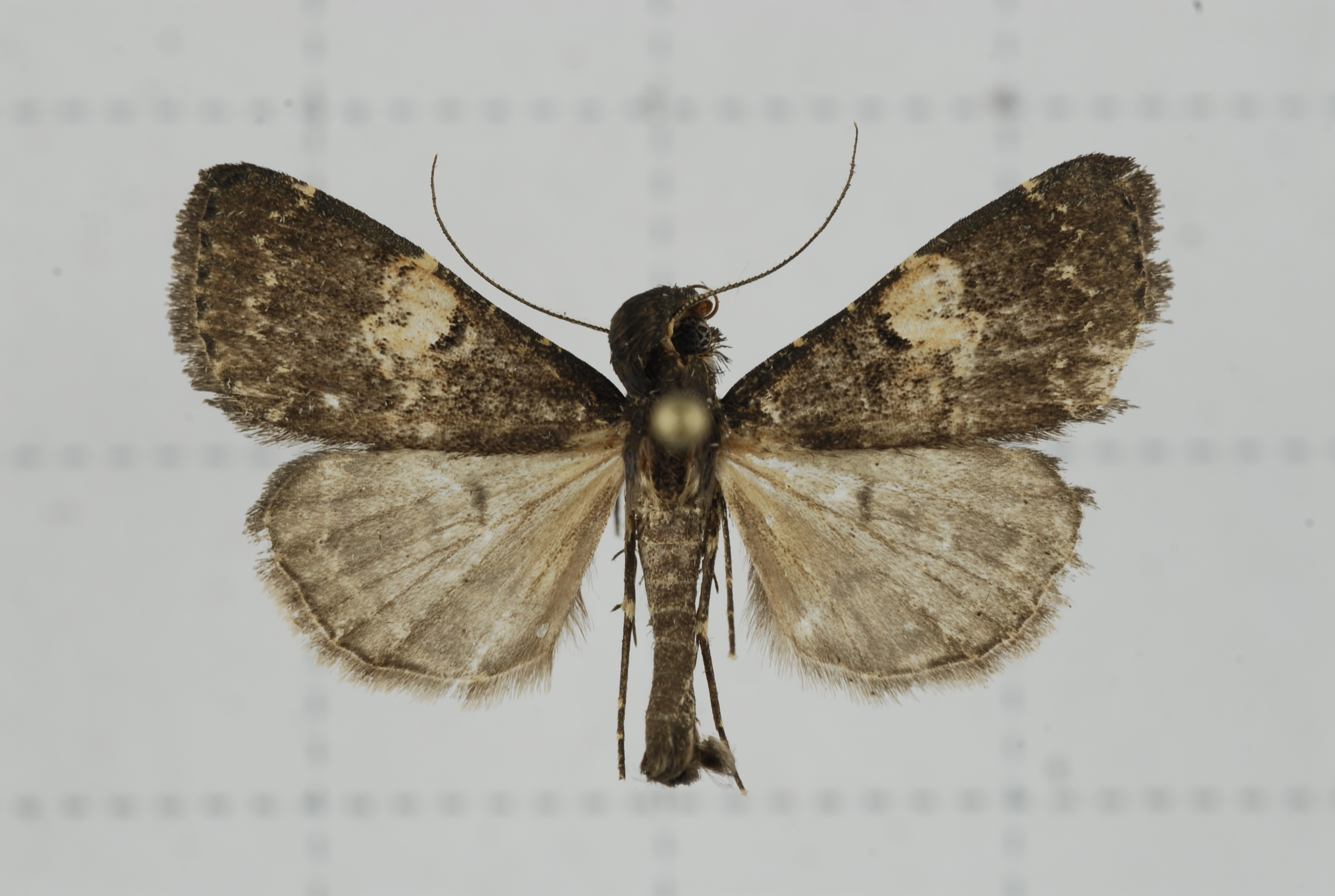
