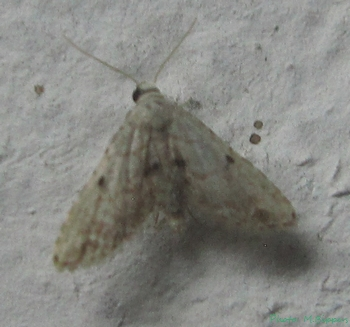

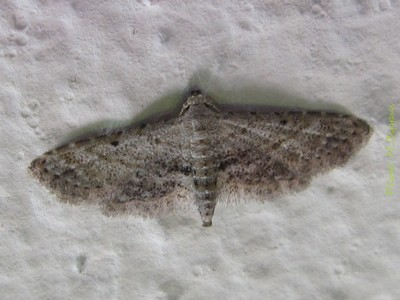

Scientific classification
- Domain: Eukaryota
- Kingdom: Animalia
- Phylum: Arthropoda
- Class: Insecta
- Order: Lepidoptera
- Superfamily: Noctuoidea
- Family: Erebidae
- Genus: Araeopteron
- Species: A. papaziani

Binomial name
- Araeopteron papaziani (Guillermet, 2009)

Synonyms
- Araeoptera papaziani Guillermet, 2009

= Araeopteron papaziani =

Species of moth

Araeopteron papaziani is a species of moth of the family Erebidae first described by Christian Guillermet in 2009. It is found on Réunion, Comoros, Madagascar and Mauritius.

Its wingspan is 8–11 mm.
