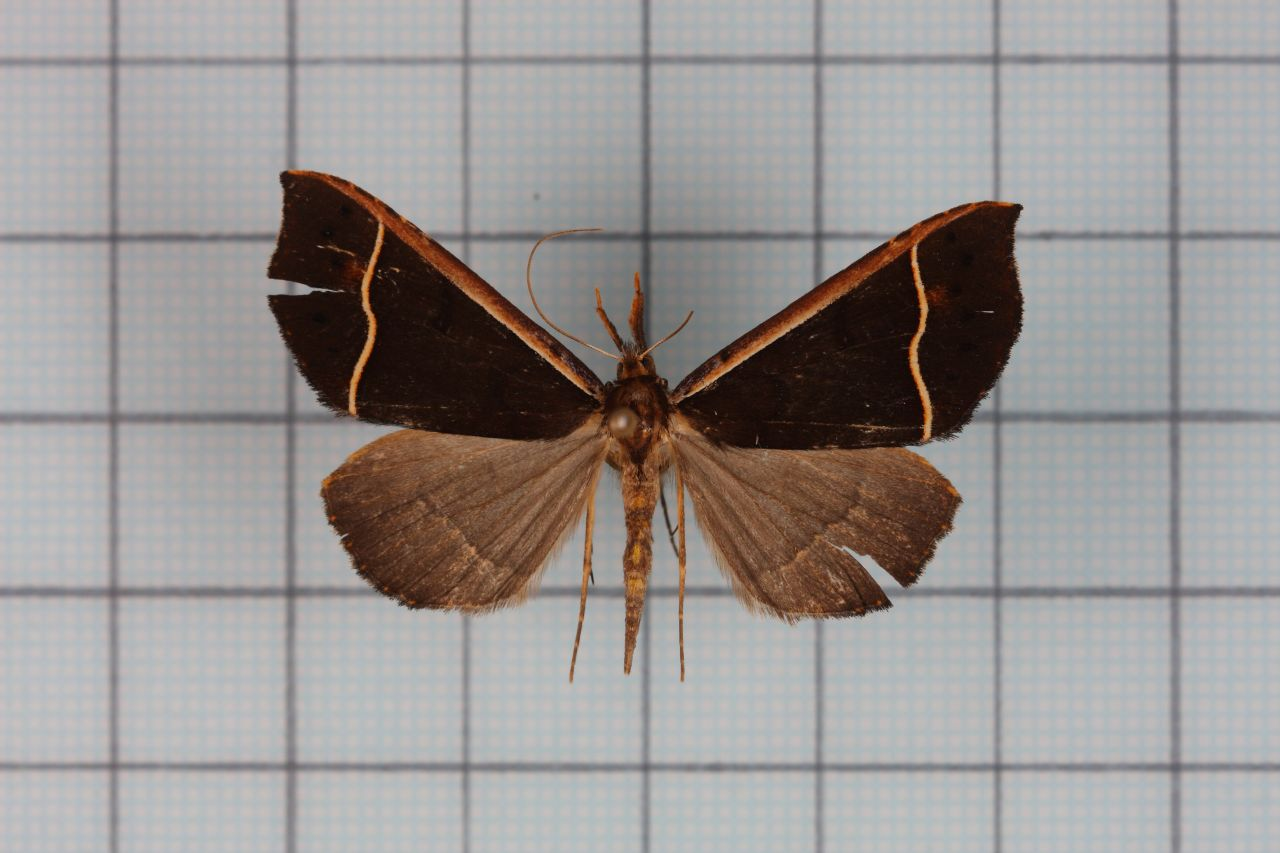

Scientific classification
- Domain: Eukaryota
- Kingdom: Animalia
- Phylum: Arthropoda
- Class: Insecta
- Order: Lepidoptera
- Superfamily: Noctuoidea
- Family: Erebidae
- Genus: Anoratha
- Species: A. sinuosa

Binomial name
- Anoratha sinuosa Wileman & South, 1916

= Anoratha sinuosa =

Species of moth

Anoratha sinuosa is a moth of the family Erebidae first described by Wileman and South in 1916. It is found in Taiwan.
