= Araeopteron minimale =

Scientific classification
- Domain: Eukaryota
- Kingdom: Animalia
- Phylum: Arthropoda
- Class: Insecta
- Order: Lepidoptera
- Superfamily: Noctuoidea
- Family: Erebidae
- Genus: Araeopteron
- Species: A. minimale

Binomial name
- Araeopteron minimale Fryer, 1912

Species of moth

Araeopteron minimale is a species of moth of the family Erebidae. It is found in the Seychelles on Mahé and Félicité Island.

The wingspan of the adult moths is 10–11 mm.
