= Anoratha albitibita =

Scientific classification
- Domain: Eukaryota
- Kingdom: Animalia
- Phylum: Arthropoda
- Class: Insecta
- Order: Lepidoptera
- Superfamily: Noctuoidea
- Family: Erebidae
- Genus: Anoratha
- Species: A. albitibita

Binomial name
- Anoratha albitibita Wileman & West, 1930

Species of moth

Anoratha albitibita is a moth of the family Erebidae first described by Wileman and West in 1930. It is found on Luzon in the Philippines.

The wingspan is about 50 mm.
