= Anoratha nabalua =

Scientific classification
- Kingdom: Animalia
- Phylum: Arthropoda
- Clade: Pancrustacea
- Class: Insecta
- Order: Lepidoptera
- Superfamily: Noctuoidea
- Family: Erebidae
- Genus: Anoratha
- Species: A. nabalua

Binomial name
- Anoratha nabalua Holloway, 1976

Species of moth

Anoratha nabalua is a moth of the family Erebidae first described by Jeremy Daniel Holloway in 1976. It is found on Borneo.
