= Acidon bigrammica =

Scientific classification
- Kingdom: Animalia
- Phylum: Arthropoda
- Clade: Pancrustacea
- Class: Insecta
- Order: Lepidoptera
- Superfamily: Noctuoidea
- Family: Erebidae
- Genus: Acidon
- Species: A. bigrammica

Binomial name
- Acidon bigrammica (Saalmüller, 1880)

Synonyms
- Hypena bigrammica

Species of moth

Acidon bigrammica is a moth of the family Erebidae first described by Max Saalmüller in 1880. It is found in Madagascar.
