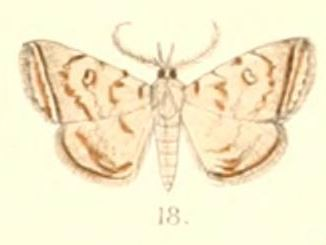
- Mixomelia duplexa

Scientific classification
- Kingdom: Animalia
- Phylum: Arthropoda
- Class: Insecta
- Order: Lepidoptera
- Superfamily: Noctuoidea
- Family: Erebidae
- Subfamily: Herminiinae
- Genus: Mixomelia; Hampson, 1898

= Mixomelia =

Genus of moths

Mixomelia is a genus of moths of the family Noctuidae.

== Species ==
Based on Home of Ichneumonoidea:

- Mixomelia adda (Swinhoe, 1902)
- Mixomelia albapex (Hampson, 1895)
- Mixomelia albeola (Rothschild, 1915)
- Mixomelia aroa (Bethune-Baker, 1908)
- Mixomelia cidaroides (Hampson, 1891)
- Mixomelia ctenucha (Turner, 1902)
- Mixomelia decipiens Hampson, 1898
- Mixomelia digramma Prout, 1928
- Mixomelia duplexa (Moore, 1882)
- Mixomelia duplicinota (Hampson, 1895)
- Mixomelia erecta (Moore, 1882)
- Mixomelia erythropoda (Hampson, 1896)
- Mixomelia palumbina (Butler, 1889)
- Mixomelia producta (Hampson, 1907)
- Mixomelia relata (Hampson, 1891)
- Mixomelia rivulosa (Wileman, 1915)
- Mixomelia saccharivora (Butler, 1889)
