= Hydrillodes surata =

Scientific classification
- Domain: Eukaryota
- Kingdom: Animalia
- Phylum: Arthropoda
- Class: Insecta
- Order: Lepidoptera
- Superfamily: Noctuoidea
- Family: Erebidae
- Genus: Hydrillodes
- Species: H. surata

Binomial name
- Hydrillodes surata Meyrick, 1910

Species of moth

Hydrillodes surata is a species of moth of the family Erebidae. It is found in New Zealand at the Kermadec Islands, New Hebrides, Samoa, Tonga.
