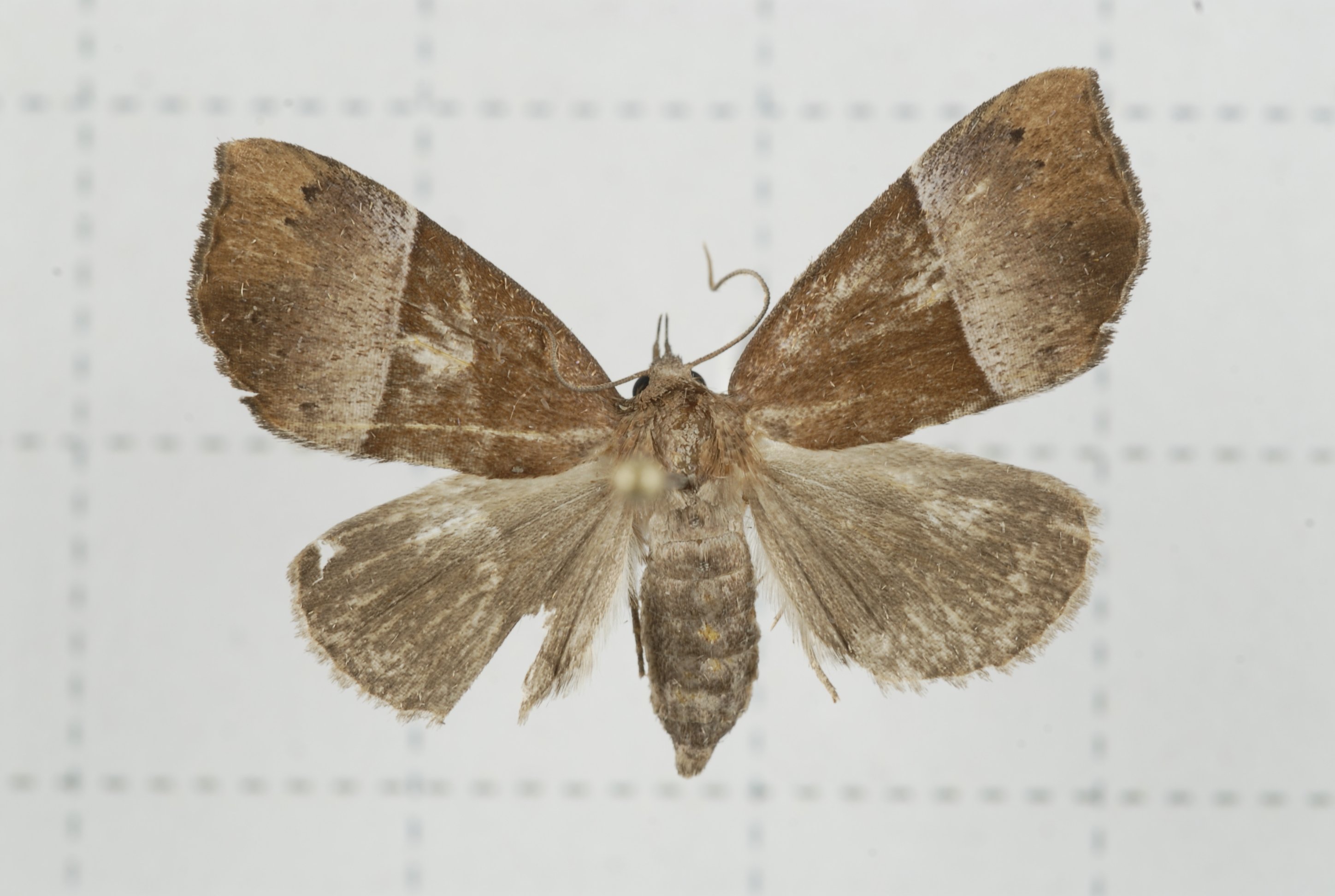
- A. pseudohypena

Scientific classification
- Kingdom: Animalia
- Phylum: Arthropoda
- Class: Insecta
- Order: Lepidoptera
- Superfamily: Noctuoidea
- Family: Erebidae
- Subfamily: Hypeninae
- Genus: Acidon; Hampson, 1896

Type species
- Acidon paradoxa Hampson, 1896

= Acidon =

Genus of moths

Acidon is a genus of moths of the family Erebidae. The genus was erected by George Hampson in 1896.

== Species ==
Some species of this genus are:

- Acidon albolineata (Hampson, 1895) - India and Bhutan
- Acidon bigrammica (Saalmüller, 1880) - Madagascar
- Acidon evae Lödl, 1998 - India, Hong Kong
- Acidon hemiphaea (Hampson 1906) - India
- Acidon mariae Lödl, 1998 - Java and Malaysia
- Acidon mediobrunnea (Holloway, 1976) - Borneo
- Acidon nigrobasis (Hampson, 1895) - India and Sri Lanka, Borneo
- Acidon obscurobasalis (Saalmüller, 1880) - Madagascar
- Acidon paradoxa Hampson, 1896 - Bhutan
- Acidon sabada (Swinhoe, 1905) - Malaysia
- Acidon steniptera (Hampson, 1902) - India
- Acidon rectilineata (Hampson, 1896) - India
