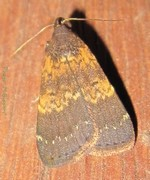
- Hydrillodes uliginosalis

Scientific classification
- Kingdom: Animalia
- Phylum: Arthropoda
- Class: Insecta
- Order: Lepidoptera
- Superfamily: Noctuoidea
- Family: Erebidae
- Subfamily: Herminiinae
- Genus: Hydrillodes; Guenée, 1854

Synonyms
- Olybama Walker, 1859; Echana Walker, 1859; Bibacta Moore, 1882; Ragana Swinhoe, 1900; Cellacrinata Bethune-Baker, 1908

= Hydrillodes =

Genus of moths

Hydrillodes is a genus of litter moths of the family Erebidae first described by Achille Guenée in 1854. Its validity is somewhat disputed.

== Description ==
Palpi long and sickle shaped. Second joint curved over the head and third joint long. Thorax and abdomen smoothly scaled. Forewings with rounded apex usually. The outer margin evenly curved with short cell. Veins 4 and stalked. Hardly a trace of the discocellulars found. Vein 6 from upper angle of cell and veins 7 to 10 stalked. Hindwings with short cell. Vein 3 and 4 stalked. Vein 5 from lower angle of cell and vein 6 and 7 stalked.

== Species ==
Species of the genus include:

- Hydrillodes abavalis (Walker, [1859])
- Hydrillodes aroa Bethune-Baker, 1908
- Hydrillodes aviculalis Guenée, 1862
- Hydrillodes bryophiloides (Butler, 1876) junior synonym of Hydrillodes aviculalis
- Hydrillodes captiosalis (Walker, [1859])
- Hydrillodes carayoni Viette, 1981
- Hydrillodes chionaemoides (Rothschild, 1915)
- Hydrillodes comoroana (Viette, 1981)
- Hydrillodes contigua (Wileman, 1915)
- Hydrillodes crispipalpus Collenette, 1928
- Hydrillodes danum Holloway, 2008
- Hydrillodes dimissalis (Walker, 1866)
- Hydrillodes discoidea (Viette, 1961)
- Hydrillodes erythusalis (Walker, [1859])
- Hydrillodes eucaula Prout, 1928
- Hydrillodes fuliginosa (Rothschild, 1915)
- Hydrillodes funestalis (Walker, 1866)
- Hydrillodes gravatalis (Walker, [1859])
- Hydrillodes grisea (Bethune-Baker, 1908)
- Hydrillodes griseoides Poole, 1989
- Hydrillodes hemusalis (Walker, [1859])
- Hydrillodes incerta (Viette, 1961)
- Hydrillodes inversa (Viette, 1961)
- Hydrillodes janalis (Schaus, 1893)
- Hydrillodes labi Holloway, 2008
- Hydrillodes latifascialis (Walker, [1866])
- Hydrillodes lentalis Guenee, 1854
- Hydrillodes lugens Prout, 1922
- Hydrillodes mediochracea Bethune-Baker, 1908
- Hydrillodes meeki (Bethune-Baker, 1908)
- Hydrillodes melanozona Collenette, 1928
- Hydrillodes metisalis (Walker, 1859)
- Hydrillodes moloalis (Walker, 1859)
- Hydrillodes morosa Butler (1879)
- Hydrillodes murudensis Prout, 1928
- Hydrillodes nilgirialis Hampson, 1895
- Hydrillodes norfolki Holloway, 1977
- Hydrillodes nubeculalis Roepke, 1948
- Hydrillodes obscurans Bryk, 1949
- Hydrillodes pacifica Owada, 1982
- Hydrillodes pala Holloway, 2008
- Hydrillodes perplexalis Fryer 1912
- Hydrillodes pertruncata Prout, 1928
- Hydrillodes plicalis (Moore, 1867)
- Hydrillodes plicaloides Holloway, 2008
- Hydrillodes poiensis Prout, 1928
- Hydrillodes postpallida (Rothschild, 19
- Hydrillodes pseudmorosa Strand, 1920
- Hydrillodes pterota Prout, 1928
- Hydrillodes pyraustalis (Viette, 1954)
- Hydrillodes semiluna Wileman & West, 1930
- Hydrillodes sigma Tams, 1935
- Hydrillodes subalbida Bethune-Baker, 1908
- Hydrillodes subbasalis Moore, 1877
- Hydrillodes subtruncata Roepke, 1948
- Hydrillodes surata Meyrick, 1910
- Hydrillodes telisai Holloway, 2008
- Hydrillodes thomensis Prout, 1927
- Hydrillodes toresalis (Walker, 1859)
- Hydrillodes torsivena Hampson, 1895
- Hydrillodes truncata (Moore, 1882)
- Hydrillodes uliginosalis Guenée, 1854
- Hydrillodes vexillifera Hampson, 1900
