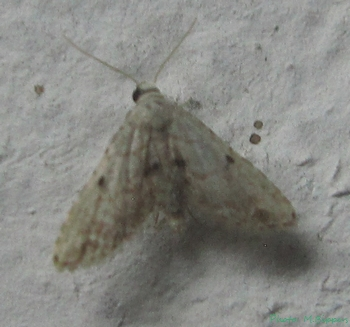
- Araeopteron papaziani

Scientific classification
- Kingdom: Animalia
- Phylum: Arthropoda
- Clade: Pancrustacea
- Class: Insecta
- Order: Lepidoptera
- Superfamily: Noctuoidea
- Family: Erebidae
- Subfamily: Boletobiinae
- Genus: Araeopteron; Hampson, 1893

Synonyms
- Araeopterum Hampson, 1895; Essonistis Meyrick, 1902; Thelxinoa Turner, 1902; Araeoptera Hampson, 1910; Araeopterella Fibiger & Hacker, 2001

= Araeopteron =

Genus of moths

Araeopteron is a genus of moths of the family Erebidae. The genus was erected by George Hampson in 1893.

== Taxonomy ==
The genus has previously been classified in the subfamily Araeopteroninae within Erebidae or in the subfamily Acontiinae of the family Noctuidae. A recent overview of the diversity is given by Han & Kononenko (2021).

== Description ==
Palpi slender and sickle shaped, reaching just above the vertex of the head. Antennae almost simple. Thorax and abdomen smoothly scaled. Tibia naked. Forewings rather long and narrow. The apex rounded. Veins 3, 4 and 8, 9, 10, 11 stalked, whereas veins 6 arise from below angle of cell and vein 7 from angle. Hindwings with veins 3, 4 and 6, 7 stalked. Vein 5 from middle of discocellulars.

== Species ==
- Araeopteron acidalica Hampson, 1910
- Araeopteron adeni Fibiger & Hacker, 2001
- Araeopteron alboniger Fibiger & Hacker, 2001
- Araeopteron amoena Inoue, 1958
- Araeopteron aulombardi Fibiger & Hacker, 2001
- Araeopteron betie Dyar, 1914
- Araeopteron canescens Walker, 1866
- Araeopteron dawai Han & Kononenko, 2021
- Araeopteron diehli Fibiger, 2002
- Araeopteron ecphaea Hampson, 1914
- Araeopteron elam Schaus, 1911
- Araeopteron epiphracta Turner, 1902
- Araeopteron fasciale Hampson, 1896
- Araeopteron flaccida Inoue, 1958
- Araeopteron fragmenta Inoue, 1965
- Araeopteron goniophora Hampson, 1907
- Araeopteron griseata Hampson, 1907
- Araeopteron imbecilla Turner, 1933
- Araeopteron koreana Fibiger & Kononenko, 2008
- Araeopteron kurokoi Inoue, 1958
- Araeopteron legraini Bippus, 2018
- Araeopteron leucoplaga Hampson, 1910
- Araeopteron makikoae Fibiger & Kononenko, 2008
- Araeopteron medogensis Han & Kononenko, 2021
- Araeopteron micraeola (Meyrick, 1902
- Araeopteron microclyta Turner, 1920
- Araeopteron minimale Freyer, 1912
- Araeopteron nebulosa Inoue, 1965
- Araeopteron nigrizonatum Hirano, 2021
- Araeopteron nigrizonatum chinensis Yao, Li & Han, 2026
- Araeopteron nivalis Hampson, 1907
- Araeopteron obliquifascia Joanis, 1910
- Araeopteron papaziani Guillermet, 2009
- Araeopteron pictale Hampson, 1893
- Araeopteron pleurotypa Turner, 1902
- Araeopteron poliobapta Turner, 1925
- Araeopteron poliophaea (Hampson, 1910)
- Araeopteron proleuca Hampson, 1907
- Araeopteron rufescens Turner, 1910
- Araeopteron schreieri Fibiger & Hacker, 2001
- Araeopteron sterrhaoides Fibiger & Hacker, 2001
- Araeopteron tibeta Han & Kononenko, 2021
- Araeopteron xanthopis Hampson, 1907
- Araeopteron yemeni Fibiger & Hacker, 2001

== Former species ==
- Araeopteron vilhelmina Dyar, 1916 (now in Sigela)
