= Araeopteron nigrizonatum =

- Male specimen of the nominate subspecies

Scientific classification
- Kingdom: Animalia
- Phylum: Arthropoda
- Clade: Pancrustacea
- Class: Insecta
- Order: Lepidoptera
- Superfamily: Noctuoidea
- Family: Erebidae
- Genus: Araeopteron
- Species: A. nigrizonatum

Binomial name
- Araeopteron nigrizonatum Hirano, 2021

Subspecies
- A. n. chinensis Yao, Li & Han, 2026; A. n. nigrizonatum

Species of moth

Araeopteron nigrizonatum is a species of moth in the family Erebidae. The nominate subspecies is native to Japan while the other subspecies Araeopteron nigrizonatum chinensis is native to mainland China.

== Taxonomy ==
Araeopteron nigrizonatum was first described by Nagao Hirano in 2021.

=== Subspecies ===
Female specimen of Araeopteron nigrizonatum chinensis

Araeopteron nigrizonatum only has a singular accepted subspecies named Araeopteron nigrizonatum chinensis described by Yao, Li & Han in 2026. It is native to mainland China.
