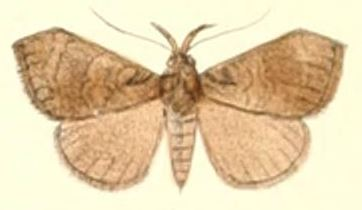

Scientific classification
- Domain: Eukaryota
- Kingdom: Animalia
- Phylum: Arthropoda
- Class: Insecta
- Order: Lepidoptera
- Superfamily: Noctuoidea
- Family: Erebidae
- Genus: Hydrillodes
- Species: H. truncata

Binomial name
- Hydrillodes truncata Moore, 1882

Synonyms
- Bibacta truncata Moore, 1882

= Hydrillodes truncata =

Species of moth

Hydrillodes truncata is a litter moth of the family Erebidae. It was first described by Frederic Moore in 1882 and is found in India.
