= Anoratha costalis =

Scientific classification
- Domain: Eukaryota
- Kingdom: Animalia
- Phylum: Arthropoda
- Class: Insecta
- Order: Lepidoptera
- Superfamily: Noctuoidea
- Family: Erebidae
- Genus: Anoratha
- Species: A. costalis

Binomial name
- Anoratha costalis Moore, 1867

Species of moth

Anoratha costalis is a moth of the family Erebidae first described by Frederic Moore in 1867. It is found in northern India.

The wingspan is 52–54 mm.
