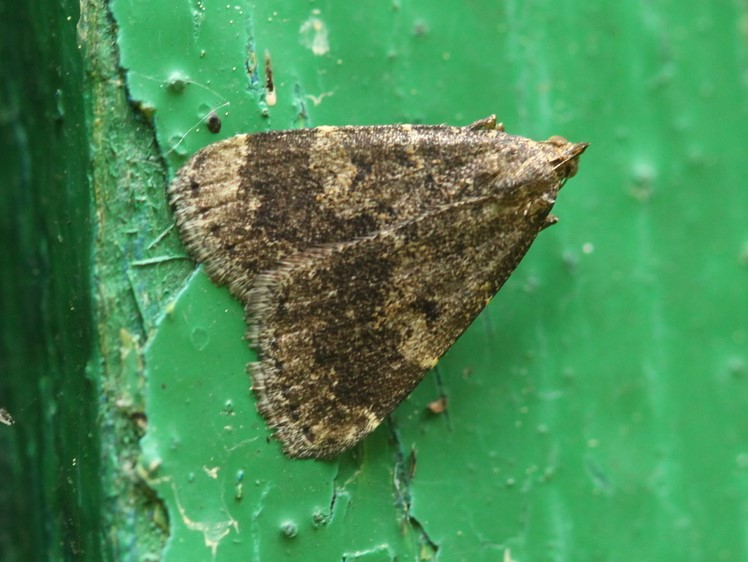

Scientific classification
- Domain: Eukaryota
- Kingdom: Animalia
- Phylum: Arthropoda
- Class: Insecta
- Order: Lepidoptera
- Superfamily: Noctuoidea
- Family: Erebidae
- Genus: Hydrillodes
- Species: H. morosa

Binomial name
- Hydrillodes morosa Butler, 1879

Synonyms
- Hydrillodes lentalis Guenée, 1854; Bleptina morosa Butler, 1879

= Hydrillodes morosa =

Species of moth

Hydrillodes morosa is a moth of the family Erebidae first described by Arthur Gardiner Butler in 1879. It is found in Sri Lanka, Myanmar and China-Korea border.

The caterpillar is known to feed on fresh, mature leaves of Litsea coreana.

The species has been used in experiments with insect teas.
