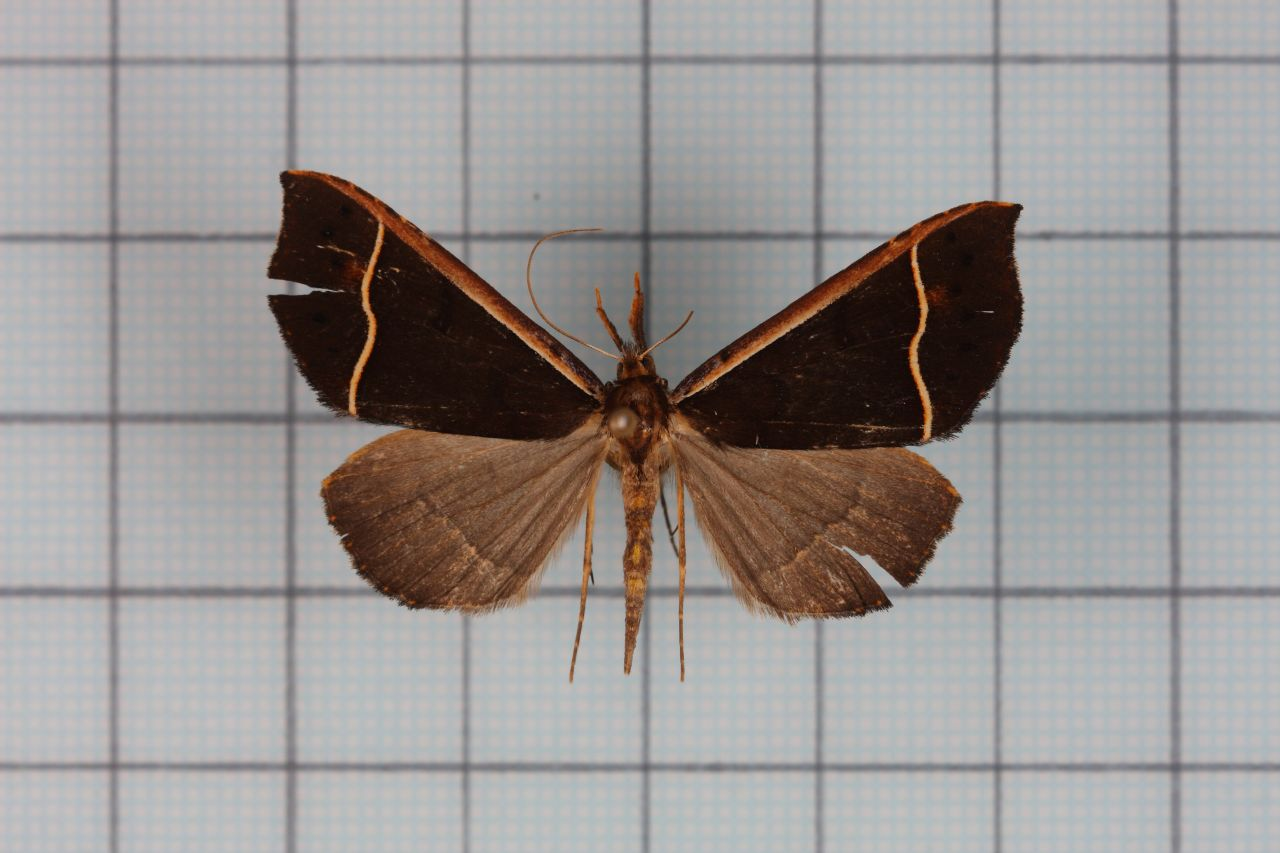
- Female Anoratha sinuosa

Scientific classification
- Domain: Eukaryota
- Kingdom: Animalia
- Phylum: Arthropoda
- Class: Insecta
- Order: Lepidoptera
- Superfamily: Noctuoidea
- Family: Erebidae
- Subfamily: Hypeninae
- Genus: Anoratha; Moore, 1867

Species
- See text

= Anoratha (moth) =

Genus of moths

Anoratha is a genus of moths of the family Erebidae described by Frederic Moore in 1867.

== Description ==
Palpi porrect (extending forward), with extremely long second joint with a downward curve, its upperside fringed with scales. Third joint long and depressed. Thorax and abdomen smoothly scaled. Abdomen very long in male. Forewings with costa arched towards apex, which is produced and acute, more so in the male than the female. The outer margin excurved at middle, especially in male. Hindwings with veins 3 and 4 on a short stalk. Vein 5 from the middle of discocellulars. The outer margin excised towards anal angle in male.

== Species ==
- Anoratha albitibita Wileman & West, 1930
- Anoratha costalis Moore, 1867
- Anoratha nabalua Holloway, 1976
- Anoratha occidentalis Gaede
- Anoratha paritalis (Walker, 1859)
- Anoratha sinuosa Wileman & South, 1916
