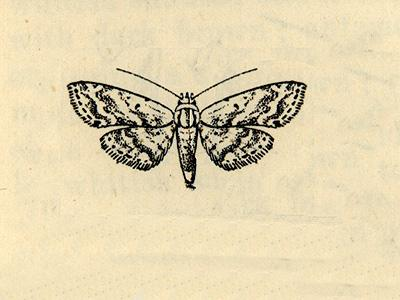

Scientific classification
- Kingdom: Animalia
- Phylum: Arthropoda
- Class: Insecta
- Order: Lepidoptera
- Superfamily: Noctuoidea
- Family: Erebidae
- Genus: Araeopteron
- Species: A. acidalica

Binomial name
- Araeopteron acidalica (Hampson, 1910)

Synonyms
- Araeoptera acidalica Hampson, 1910

= Araeopteron acidalica =

Species of moth

Araeopteron acidalica is a moth of the family Erebidae. It is found on Jamaica.
