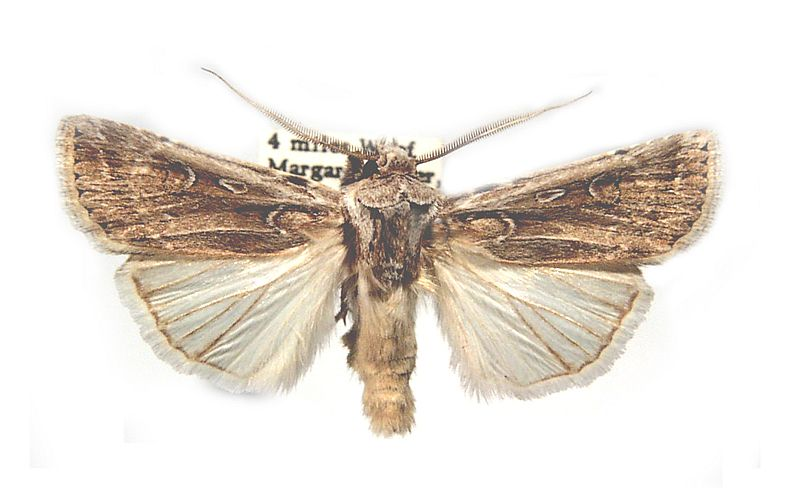
- Agrotis poliophaea

Scientific classification
- Kingdom: Animalia
- Phylum: Arthropoda
- Class: Insecta
- Order: Lepidoptera
- Superfamily: Noctuoidea
- Family: Erebidae
- Genus: Araeopteron
- Species: A. poliophaea

Binomial name
- Araeopteron poliophaea (Hampson, 1910)

Synonyms
- Araeoptera poliophaea Hampson, 1910

= Araeopteron poliophaea =

Species of moth

Araeopteron poliophaea is a moth of the family Erebidae first described by George Hampson in 1910. It is found in Sri Lanka.
