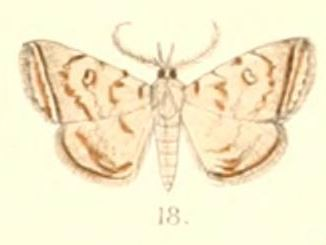

Scientific classification
- Domain: Eukaryota
- Kingdom: Animalia
- Phylum: Arthropoda
- Class: Insecta
- Order: Lepidoptera
- Superfamily: Noctuoidea
- Family: Erebidae
- Genus: Mixomelia
- Species: M. duplexa

Binomial name
- Mixomelia duplexa (Moore, 1882)

Synonyms
- Herminia duplexa Moore, 1882; Popypogon duplexa

= Mixomelia duplexa =

Species of moth

Mixomelia duplexa is a moth of the family Erebidae first described by Frederic Moore in 1882. It is found in Darjeeling, India.
