= Araeopteron nivalis =

Scientific classification
- Kingdom: Animalia
- Phylum: Arthropoda
- Class: Insecta
- Order: Lepidoptera
- Superfamily: Noctuoidea
- Family: Erebidae
- Genus: Araeopteron
- Species: A. nivalis

Binomial name
- Araeopteron nivalis Hampson, 1907

Species of moth

Araeopteron nivalis is a moth of the family Noctuidae first described by George Hampson in 1907. It is found in Sri Lanka.
