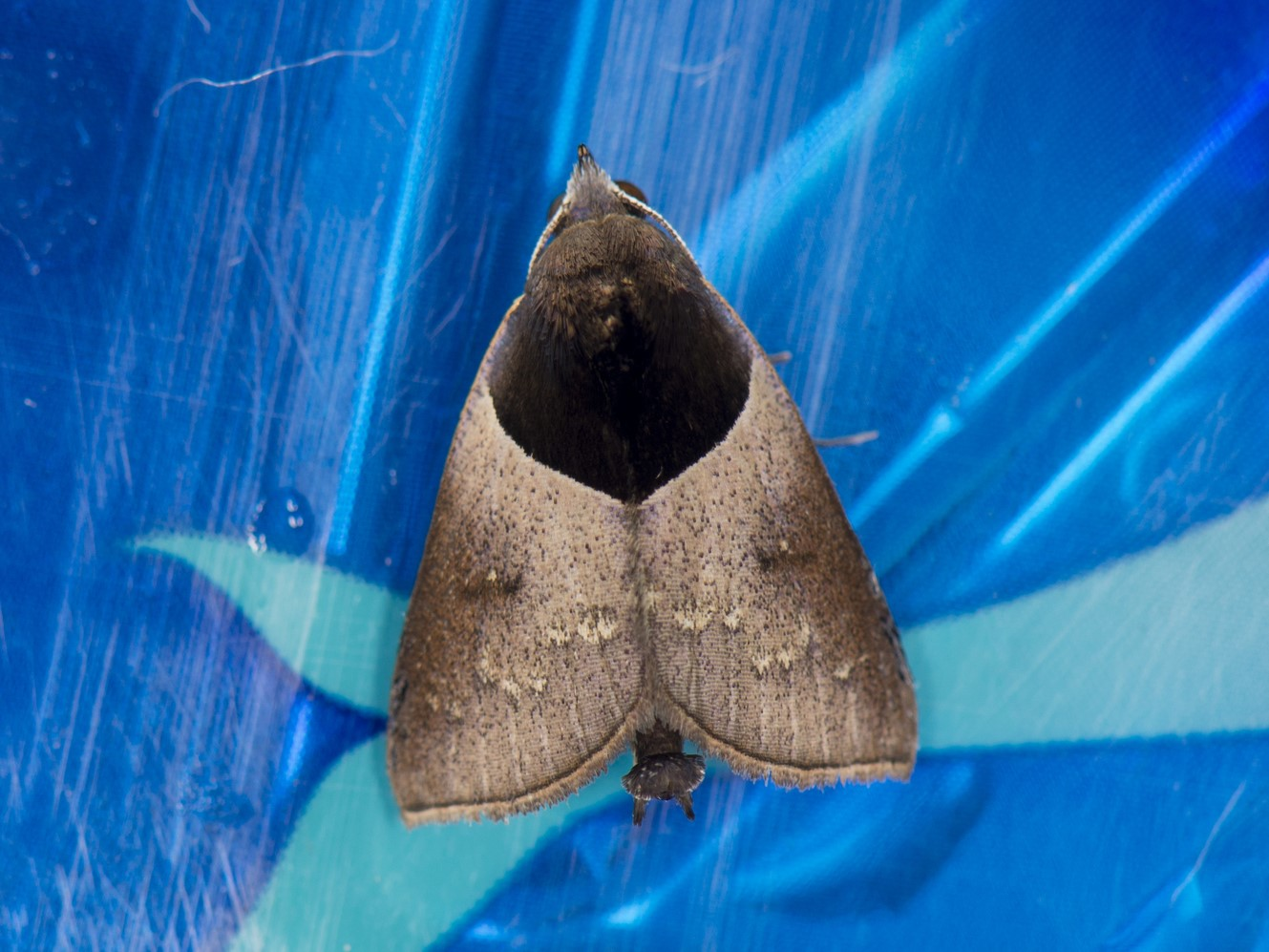

Scientific classification
- Kingdom: Animalia
- Phylum: Arthropoda
- Clade: Pancrustacea
- Class: Insecta
- Order: Lepidoptera
- Superfamily: Noctuoidea
- Family: Erebidae
- Genus: Acidon
- Species: A. nigrobasis

Binomial name
- Acidon nigrobasis (C. Swinhoe)

Synonyms
- Catada nigrobasis Swinhoe; Catada nigribasis Hampson, 1895 [lapsus]; Acidon nigribasis (Hampson, 1895) [lapsus]

= Acidon nigrobasis =

Species of moth

Acidon nigrobasis is a species of moth in the family Erebidae first described by Charles Swinhoe in 1895. It is found in India, Sri Lanka, and Borneo.

The adult wingspan is 21 – 23 mm. Its wings are greyish brown or dark brown with white scales. Ciliated antennae and eye rim grayish brown. Its short palpi and thorax are dark brown to chocolate brown in color. The black-brown root area is distinctive. The hindwing is gray brown.
