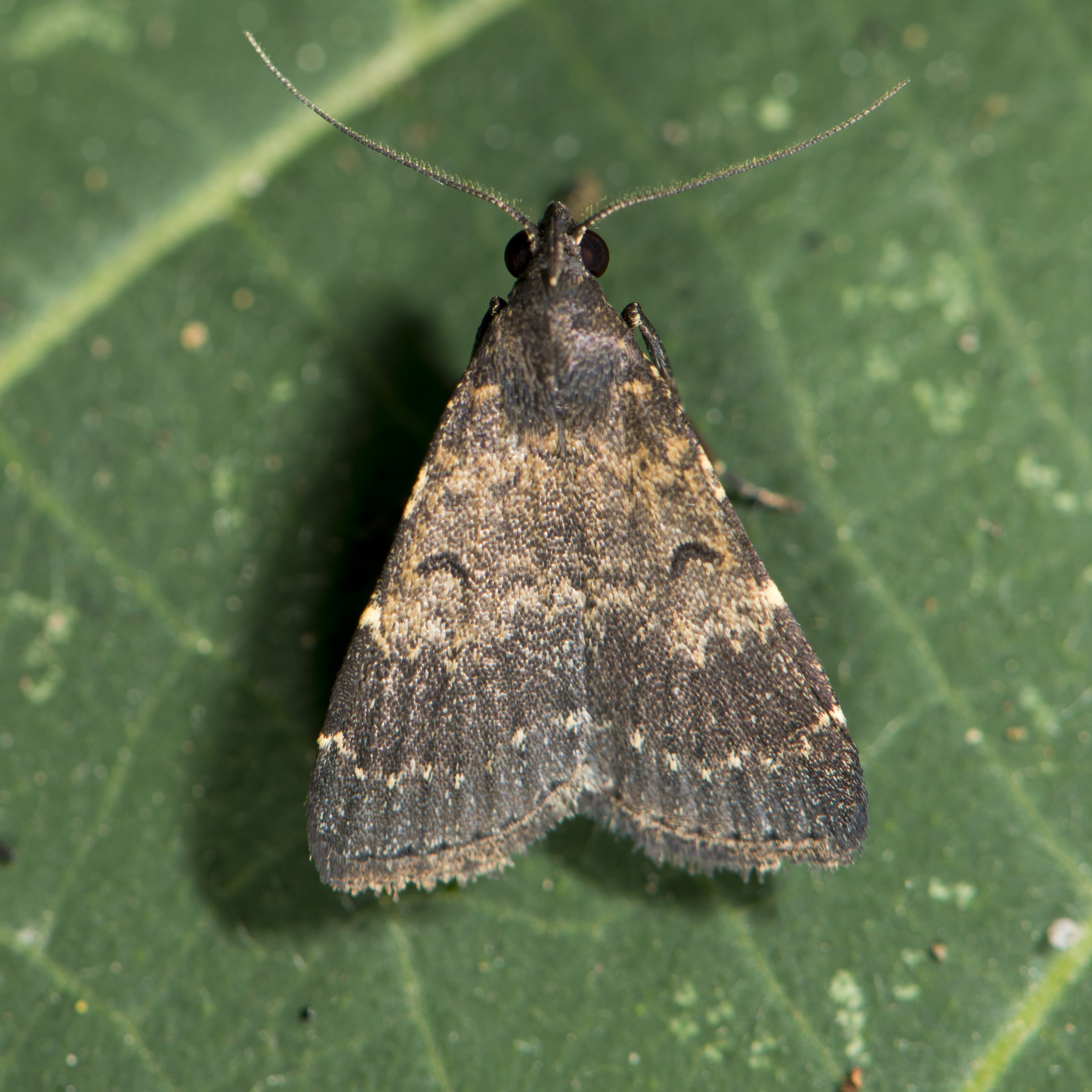

Scientific classification
- Kingdom: Animalia
- Phylum: Arthropoda
- Class: Insecta
- Order: Lepidoptera
- Superfamily: Noctuoidea
- Family: Erebidae
- Genus: Hydrillodes
- Species: H. lentalis

Binomial name
- Hydrillodes lentalis Guenee, 1854

Synonyms
- Bocana hemusalis Walker, 1859; Bleptina latifascialis Walker, 1866; Bocana moloalis Walker, 1859; Bocana momusalis Walker, 1859

= Hydrillodes lentalis =

Species of moth

Hydrillodes lentalis is a species of moth of the family Erebidae described by Achille Guenée in 1854. It is found in south-east Asia (including India, Sri Lanka, Japan and Taiwan) and Australia (Queensland).

== Description ==
The length of the forewings is 24–30 mm. Palpi with second joint smoothly scaled in front. Palpi of male with long curved third joint and with slight tuft of hair. Fore tibia fringed with hair. Antennae of male minutely ciliated. Forewings with round apex. There is no costal fold and tuft nor distortion of nervules. Body fuscous brown. Forewings with dark base. Antemedial area pale or reddish brown, crossed by a more or less developed, ill-defined, dark medial band. There is a black speck found or spot sometimes present at end of cell. The outer half of wing dark with an indistinct pale waved submarginal line. Hindwings pale with indistinct cell-spot and postmedial line, which are prominent on ventral surface.

The larvae feed on dead leaves and many grasses.
