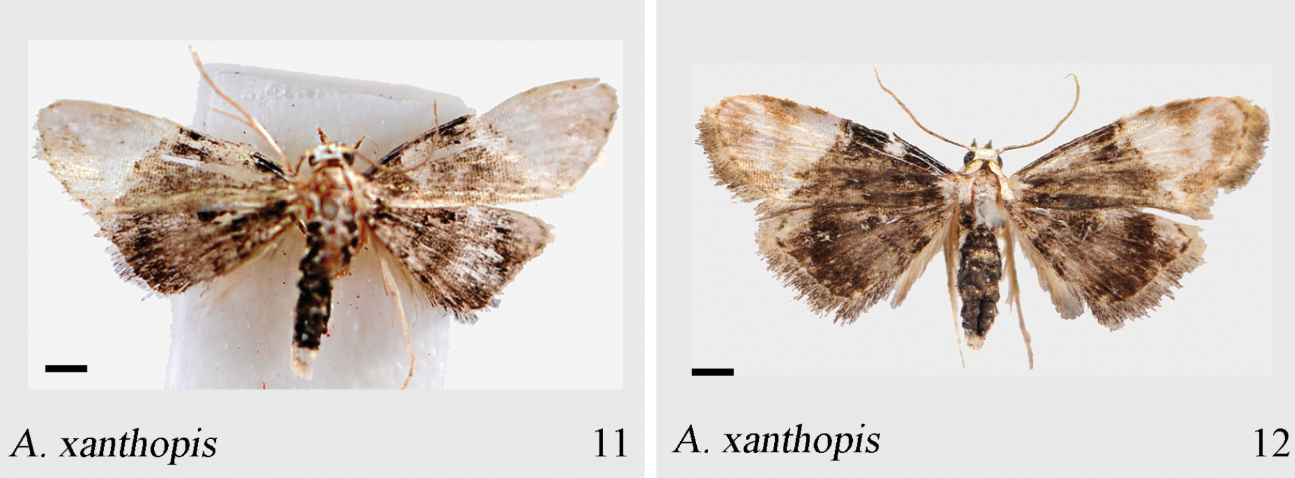

Scientific classification
- Kingdom: Animalia
- Phylum: Arthropoda
- Clade: Pancrustacea
- Class: Insecta
- Order: Lepidoptera
- Superfamily: Noctuoidea
- Family: Erebidae
- Genus: Araeopteron
- Species: A. xanthopis

Binomial name
- Araeopteron xanthopis (Hampson, 1907)

Synonyms
- Araeopterum xanthopis Hampson, 1907

= Araeopteron xanthopis =

Species of moth

Araeopteron xanthopis is a moth of the family Noctuidae first described by George Hampson in 1907. It is found in Sri Lanka and China.
