= Araeopteron rufescens =

Scientific classification
- Kingdom: Animalia
- Phylum: Arthropoda
- Class: Insecta
- Order: Lepidoptera
- Superfamily: Noctuoidea
- Family: Erebidae
- Genus: Araeopteron
- Species: A. rufescens

Binomial name
- Araeopteron rufescens (Hampson, 1910)

Synonyms
- Araeoptera rufescens Hampson, 1910

Species of moth

Araeopteron rufescens is a moth of the family Noctuidae first described by George Hampson in 1910. It is found in Sri Lanka.
