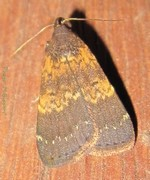

Scientific classification
- Kingdom: Animalia
- Phylum: Arthropoda
- Clade: Pancrustacea
- Class: Insecta
- Order: Lepidoptera
- Superfamily: Noctuoidea
- Family: Erebidae
- Genus: Hydrillodes
- Species: H. uliginosalis

Binomial name
- Hydrillodes uliginosalis Guenée, 1854

Synonyms
- Gizama cleobisalis Walker, 1859; Olybama thelephusalis Walker, 1859

= Hydrillodes uliginosalis =

Species of moth

Hydrillodes uliginosalis is a species of litter moth of the family Erebidae. It is found throughout many countries of subtropical Africa (including islands of the Indian Ocean).

This species has strong sexual dimorphism: the females are brown/clear brown, the males are very dark coloured, almost black.

The length of the forewings is 13–14 mm.
