= Anoratha paritalis =

Scientific classification
- Kingdom: Animalia
- Phylum: Arthropoda
- Class: Insecta
- Order: Lepidoptera
- Superfamily: Noctuoidea
- Family: Erebidae
- Genus: Anoratha
- Species: A. paritalis

Binomial name
- Anoratha paritalis (Walker, 1859)

Synonyms
- Hypena paritalis Walker, 1859

Species of moth

Anoratha paritalis is a moth of the family Erebidae. It was first described by Francis Walker in 1859 and is found in Sri Lanka.

== Description ==
The wingspan is 42–52 mm. The head and thorax are colored a pale chestnut. The palpi are black at the sides. Abdomen fuscous. Forewings pale chestnut, irrorated (sprinkled) with a darker tint. Costa slightly paler. There is an indistinct antemedial angulated line and a postmedial oblique line can be seen. Some indistinct submarginal specks also present. Hindwings fuscous. Cilia chequered rufous and fuscous. Ventral side with indistinct cell-spot and postmedial line.
