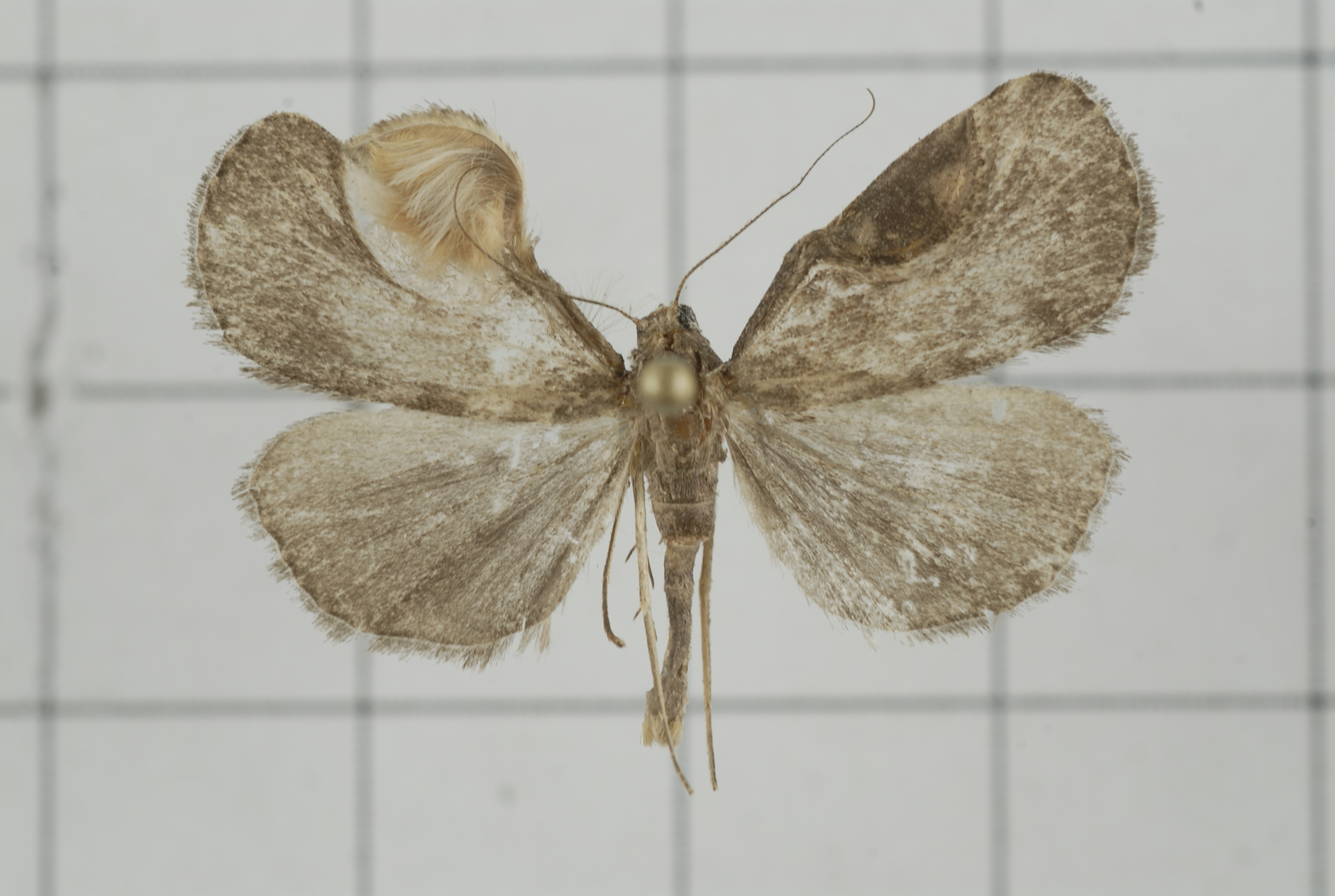

Scientific classification
- Kingdom: Animalia
- Phylum: Arthropoda
- Class: Insecta
- Order: Lepidoptera
- Superfamily: Noctuoidea
- Family: Erebidae
- Genus: Hydrillodes
- Species: H. abavalis

Binomial name
- Hydrillodes abavalis (Walker, [1859])

Synonyms
- Echana abavalis Walker, [1859]

= Hydrillodes abavalis =

Species of moth

Hydrillodes abavalis is a moth of the family Erebidae first described by Francis Walker in 1859. It is found in Sri Lanka and Borneo.

== Gallery ==
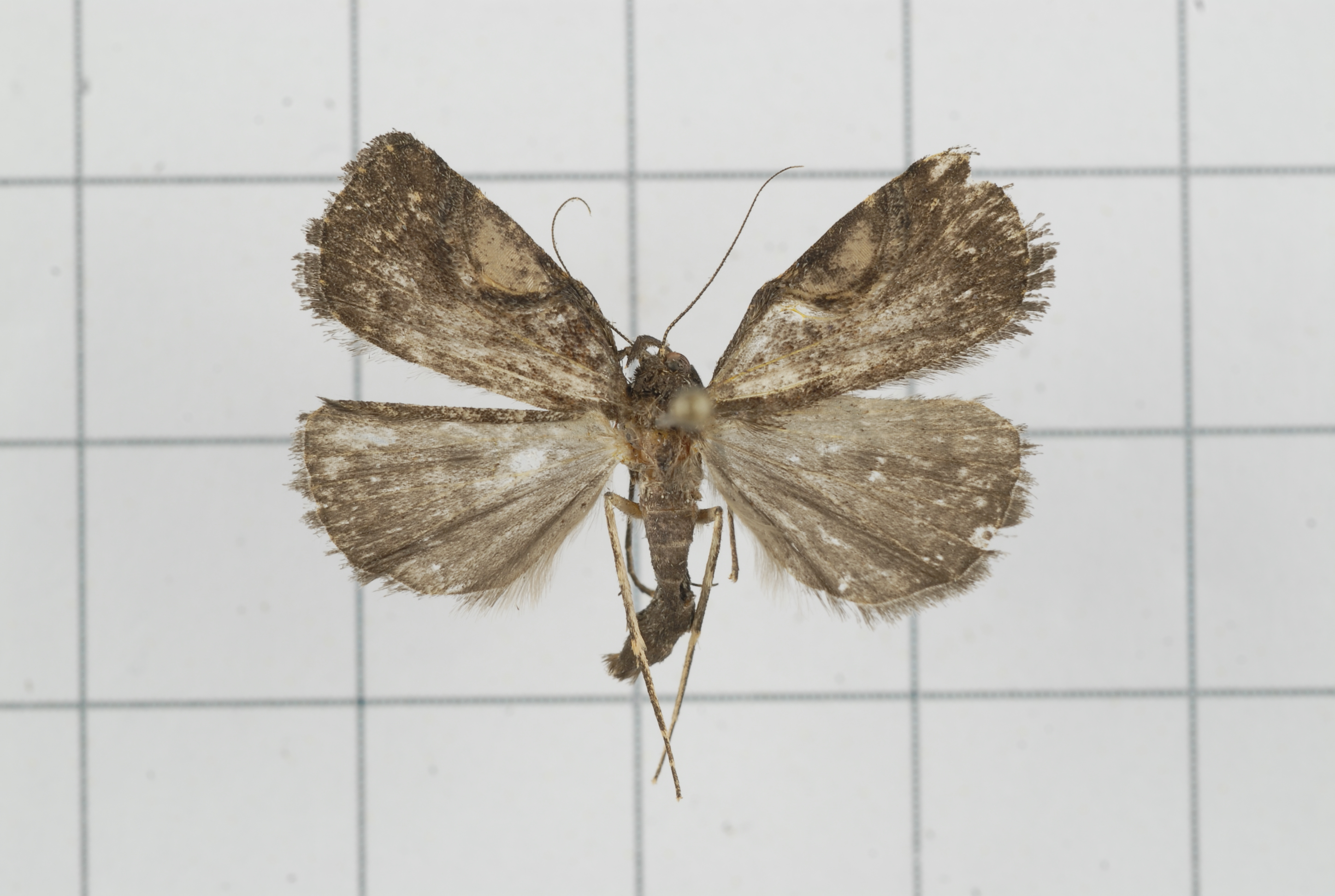

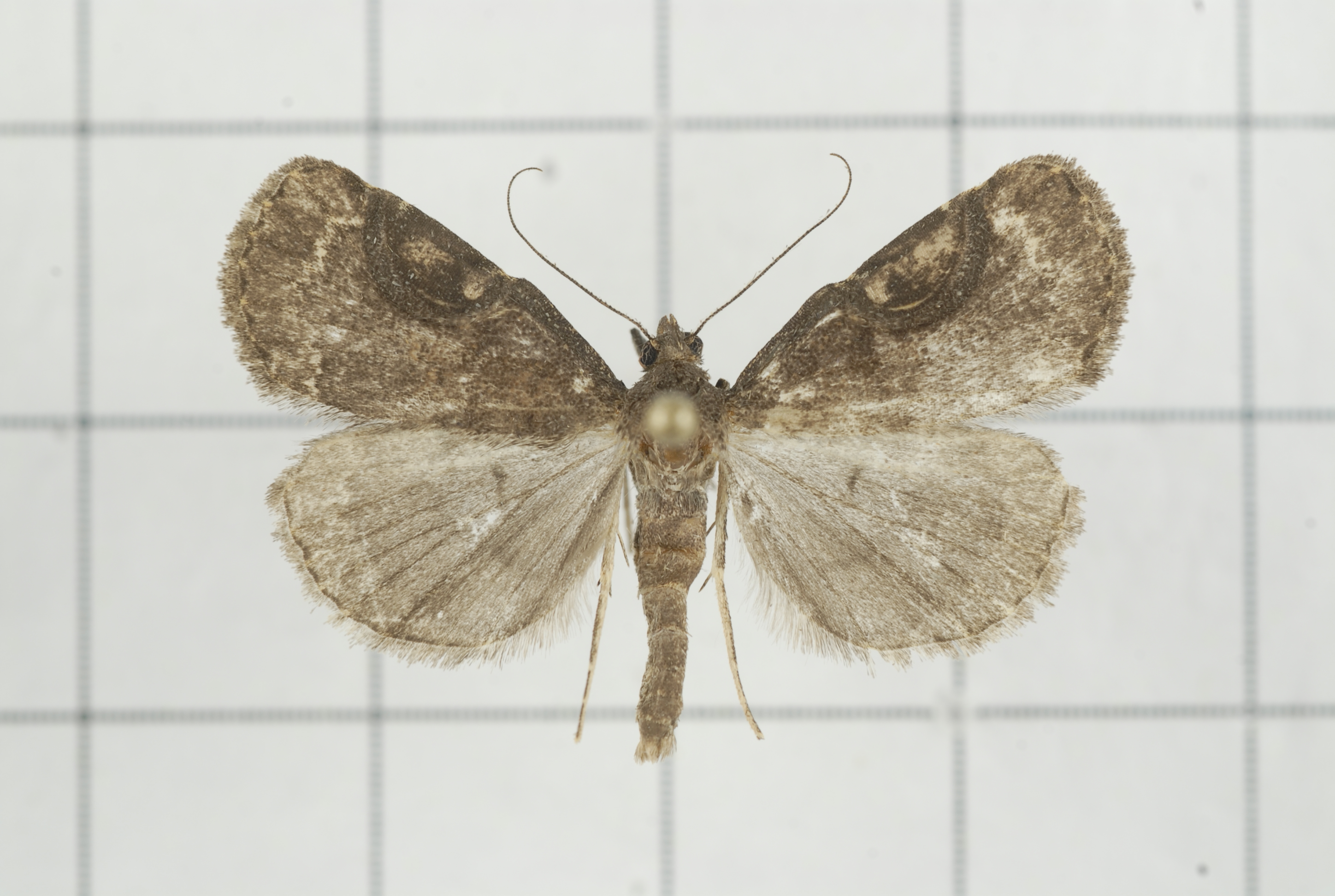

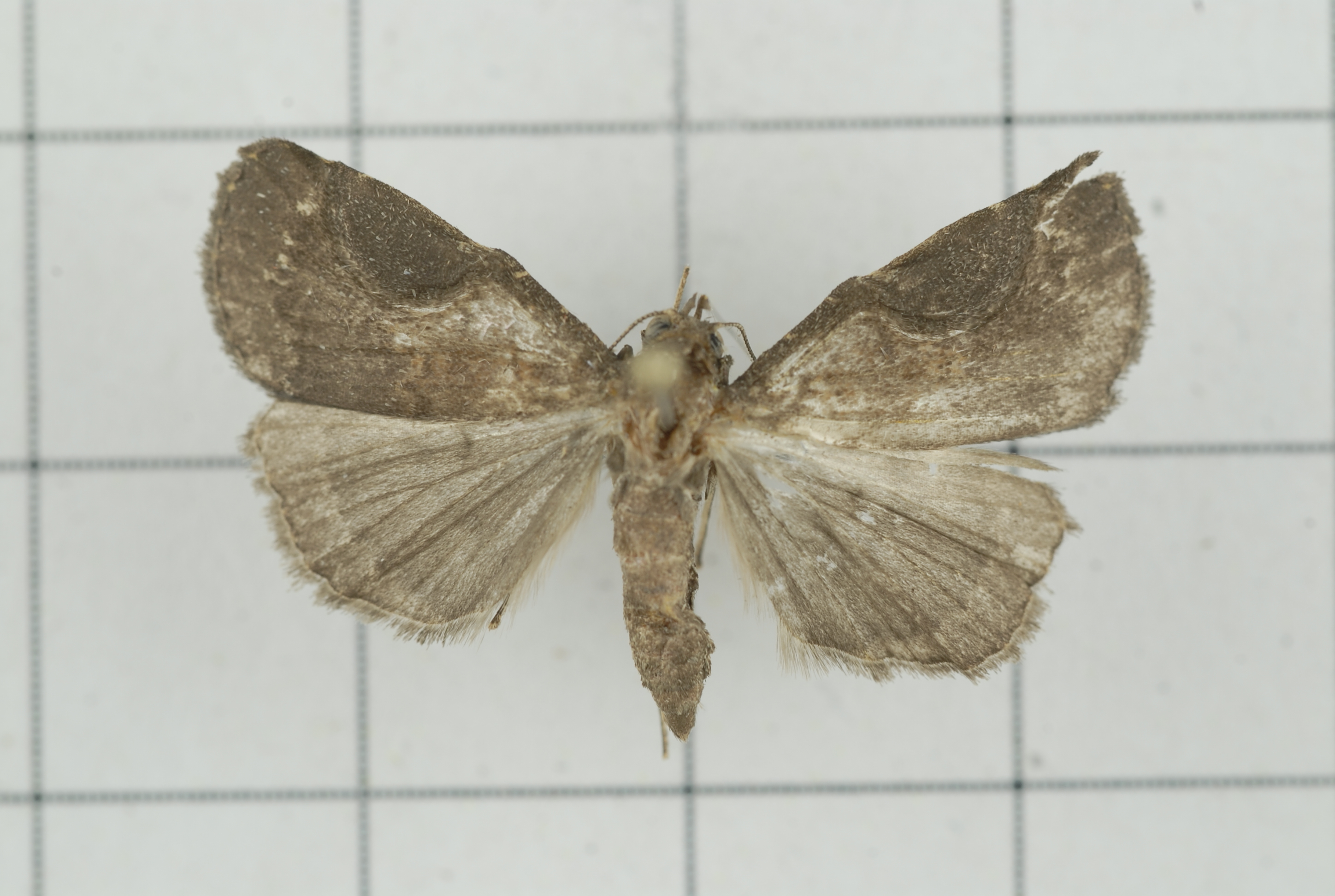
