= Araeopteron fasciale =

Scientific classification
- Kingdom: Animalia
- Phylum: Arthropoda
- Class: Insecta
- Order: Lepidoptera
- Superfamily: Noctuoidea
- Family: Erebidae
- Genus: Araeopteron
- Species: A. fasciale

Binomial name
- Araeopteron fasciale (Hampson, 1896)

Synonyms
- Araeopterum fasciale Hampson, 1896

Species of moth

Araeopteron fasciale is a species of moth of the family Erebidae first described by George Hampson in 1896. It is known from Sri Lanka.

The wingspan is 12 mm. The head and collar of this species are white, the thorax and abdomen fuscous. The forewings are pale fuscous, the costal area is suffused with white. There is a dark mark with two white specks on the costa before the apex, and an oblique white postmedial line and indistinct waved submarginal line. Hindwings are pale fuscous with black-edged medial band and an indistinct submarginal white line.
