= Araeopteron pictale =

Scientific classification
- Domain: Eukaryota
- Kingdom: Animalia
- Phylum: Arthropoda
- Class: Insecta
- Order: Lepidoptera
- Superfamily: Noctuoidea
- Family: Erebidae
- Genus: Araeopteron
- Species: A. pictale

Binomial name
- Araeopteron pictale Hampson, 1893

Species of moth

Araeopteron pictale is a moth of the family Noctuidae first described by George Hampson in 1893. It is found in Sri Lanka.
