= Araeopteron proleuca =

Scientific classification
- Kingdom: Animalia
- Phylum: Arthropoda
- Class: Insecta
- Order: Lepidoptera
- Superfamily: Noctuoidea
- Family: Erebidae
- Genus: Araeopteron
- Species: A. proleuca

Binomial name
- Araeopteron proleuca Meyrick, 1913

Species of moth

Araeopteron proleuca is a moth of the family Noctuidae first described by Edward Meyrick in 1913. It is found in India and Sri Lanka.
