= Mixomelia relata =

Scientific classification
- Kingdom: Animalia
- Phylum: Arthropoda
- Class: Insecta
- Order: Lepidoptera
- Superfamily: Noctuoidea
- Family: Erebidae
- Genus: Mixomelia
- Species: M. relata

Binomial name
- Mixomelia relata (Hampson, 1891)

Synonyms
- Herminia relata (Hampson, 1891); Zanclognatha relata Hampson, 1891

Species of moth

Mixomelia relata is a moth of the family Noctuidae first described by George Hampson in 1891. It is found in India and Sri Lanka.
