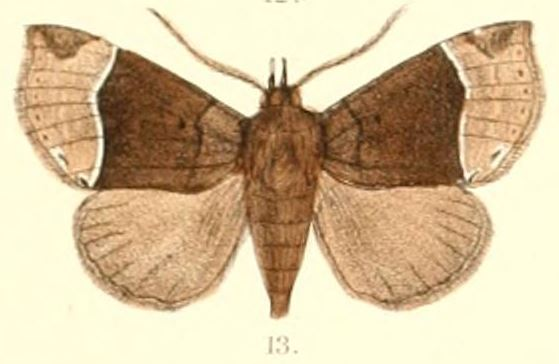

Scientific classification
- Domain: Eukaryota
- Kingdom: Animalia
- Phylum: Arthropoda
- Class: Insecta
- Order: Lepidoptera
- Superfamily: Noctuoidea
- Family: Erebidae
- Subfamily: Hypeninae
- Genus: Itmaharela; Nye, 1975 (repl.name)
- Species: I. basalis

Binomial name
- Itmaharela basalis (Moore, 1882)

Synonyms
- Harmatelia basalis Moore, 1882

= Itmaharela =

Genus of moths

Itmaharela is a genus of moths of the family Noctuidae.

This is a replacement name by Nye (1975) for the preoccupied genus Harmatelia (Moore). Lödl & Paumkirchner transferred this genus to Hypeninae in 2001.

At present, there is only one species in this genus: Itmaharela basalis Moore, 1882 that is known from India and Taiwan.
