= Araeopteron griseata =

Scientific classification
- Kingdom: Animalia
- Phylum: Arthropoda
- Class: Insecta
- Order: Lepidoptera
- Superfamily: Noctuoidea
- Family: Erebidae
- Genus: Araeopteron
- Species: A. griseata

Binomial name
- Araeopteron griseata Hampson, 1907

Species of moth

Araeopteron griseata is a species of moth of the family Erebidae. It was described by George Hampson in 1907. It is found in Sri Lanka, India, Fiji, Indonesia, Sierra Leone and South Africa.
