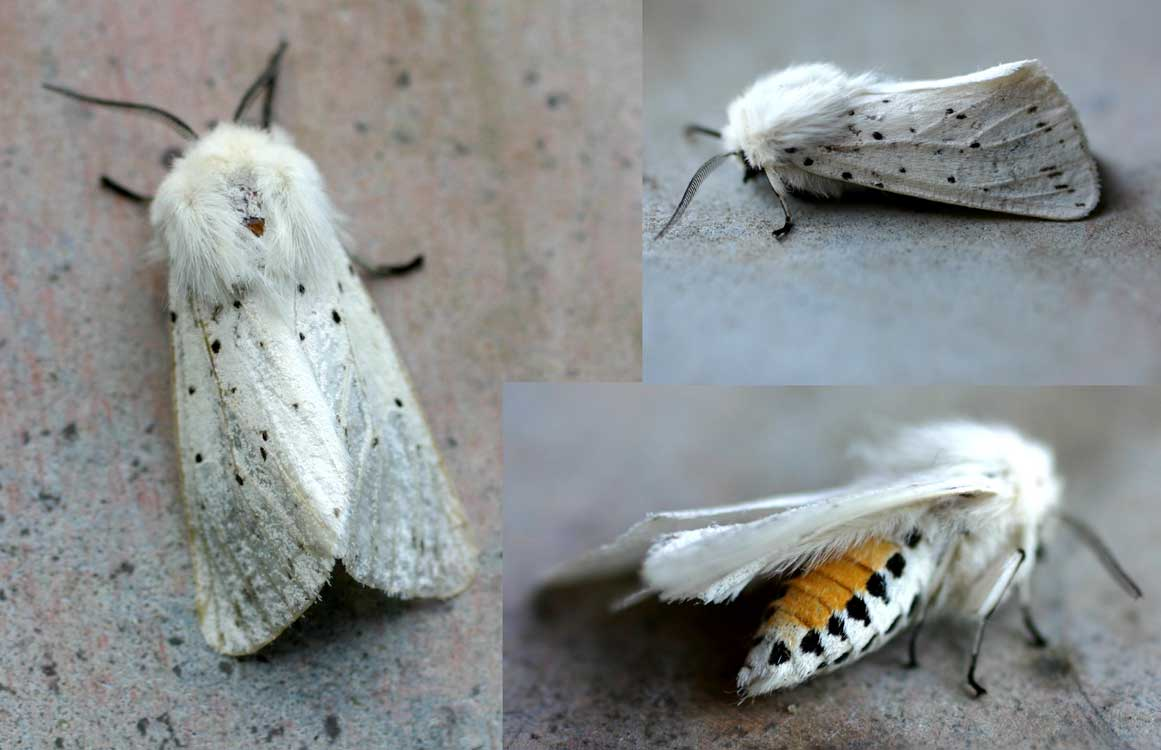

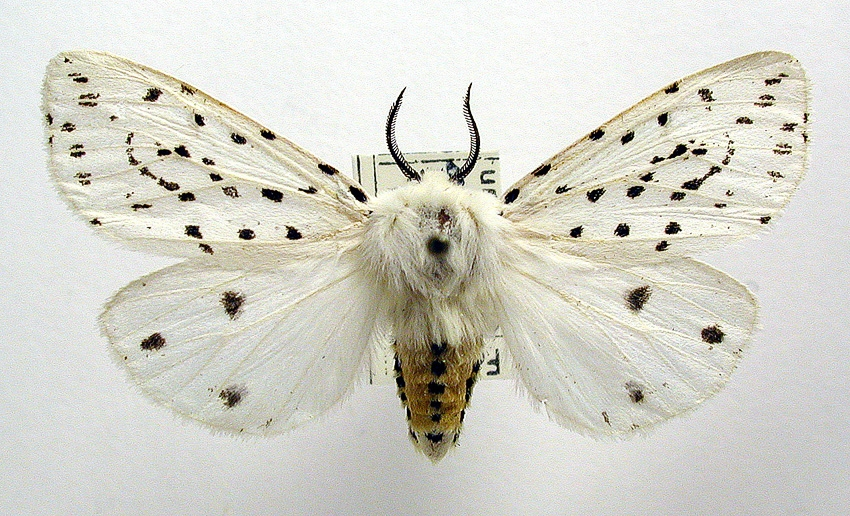

Scientific classification
- Kingdom: Animalia
- Phylum: Arthropoda
- Clade: Pancrustacea
- Class: Insecta
- Order: Lepidoptera
- Superfamily: Noctuoidea
- Family: Erebidae
- Subfamily: Arctiinae
- Genus: Spilosoma
- Species: S. lubricipeda

Binomial name
- Spilosoma lubricipeda (Linnaeus, 1758)

Synonyms
- Phalaena Bombyx lubricipeda Linnaeus, 1758; Spilosoma lubricipedum; Bombyx menthastri [Denis & Schiffermüller, 1775]; Spilosoma menthastri; Phalaena lepus Retzius, 1783; Phalaena Bombyx menthastri Esper, 1786; Bombyx mendica Rossius, 1790; Phalaena Bombyx erminea Marsham, 1791; Chelonia luxerii Godart, 1822 [1823]; Spilosoma walkerii Curtis, 1825; Diacrisia menthastri chishimana Matsumura, 1929; Diacrisia mashuensis Matsumura, 1930; Spilosoma menthastri elegans Bryk, 1948 [1949]; Spilosoma menthastri sotiriadis Koutsaftikis, 1973

= Spilosoma lubricipeda =

White ermine

Species of moth

Spilosoma lubricipeda, the white ermine, is a moth of the family Erebidae. It is found throughout the temperate belt of Eurasia from Europe through Kazakhstan and southern Siberia to Amur Region, India, China, Korea and Japan. In China several sibling species occur.

The wingspan is 34–48 mm. Wing pattern is very variable, from entirely white wings to strongly covered with black dots. Hindwings often with one or several black dots (rarely without any black dot). Antennae branches long (much longer than in similar Spilosoma urticae), 3–5 times longer than the antenna stem diameter.

== Technical description and variation ==
Milky white, abdomen orange with black dorsal dots. Forewing more or less sprinkled with sharply defined black dots, of which there are always some at the costa and others arranged in rows in the disc. Hindwing with discal dots and often with anal ones and others. Antennae black. In specimens from northern Scotland the forewing is sandy yellow, ab. ochrea, also found elsewhere as an exception among. The forewing may be darkened to brown; this is the case in ab. brunnea Ober. In ab. luxerii Godt. the forewing is suffused with rose-red distally and brownish proximally. In ab. walkeri Curt, the dots merge to form radial streaks. In Japan it usually occurs in the form sangaica Walk. which is only distinguished from lubricipeda by the sparse dots, especially in the outer area of the forewing. Specimens similar to sangaica occur aberratively also in Europe, bearing the name paucipuncta Fuchs and in contradistinction to it there is the very strongly dotted krieghoffi Pabst. A still further reduction of the dots leads to ab. unipuncta Strand, in which there is only one dot on the hindwing. -punctarium Cr. [now full species Spilosoma punctarium (Stoll, [1782])] is distinguished from lubricipeda by the carmine abdomen with sharp transverse spots, and by the wings being rather more spotted.

== Biology ==
The moth flies May to September depending on the location. They are not eaten by birds because they are poisonous.

Egg light yellow. Larva lilac-brown with deep dark brown hair and orange-yellow dorsal stripe. The larvae feed on stinging nettle, Cytisus scoparius, alfalfa, Echium vulgare and Taraxacum officinale.

== Subspecies ==
Spilosoma lubricipeda sangaicum

== Gallery ==
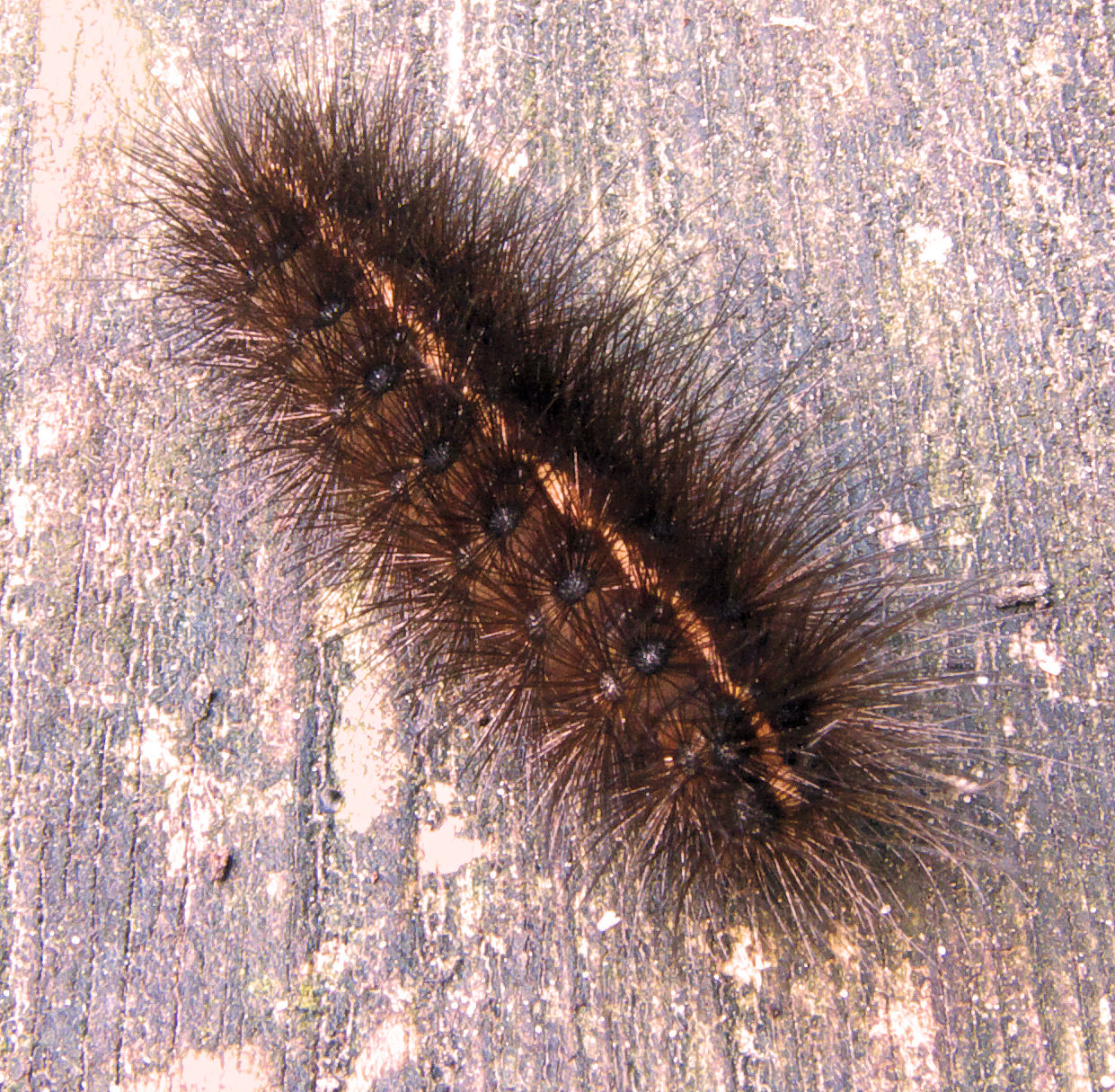

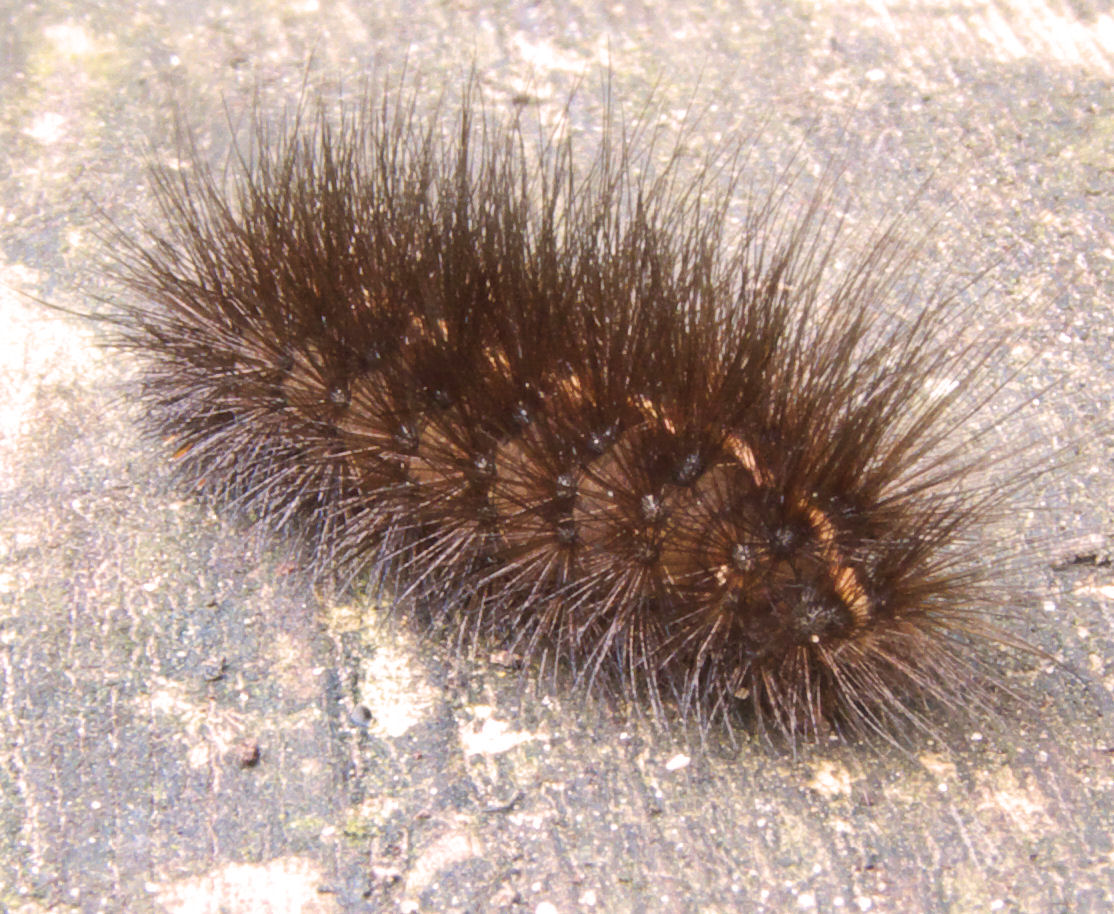

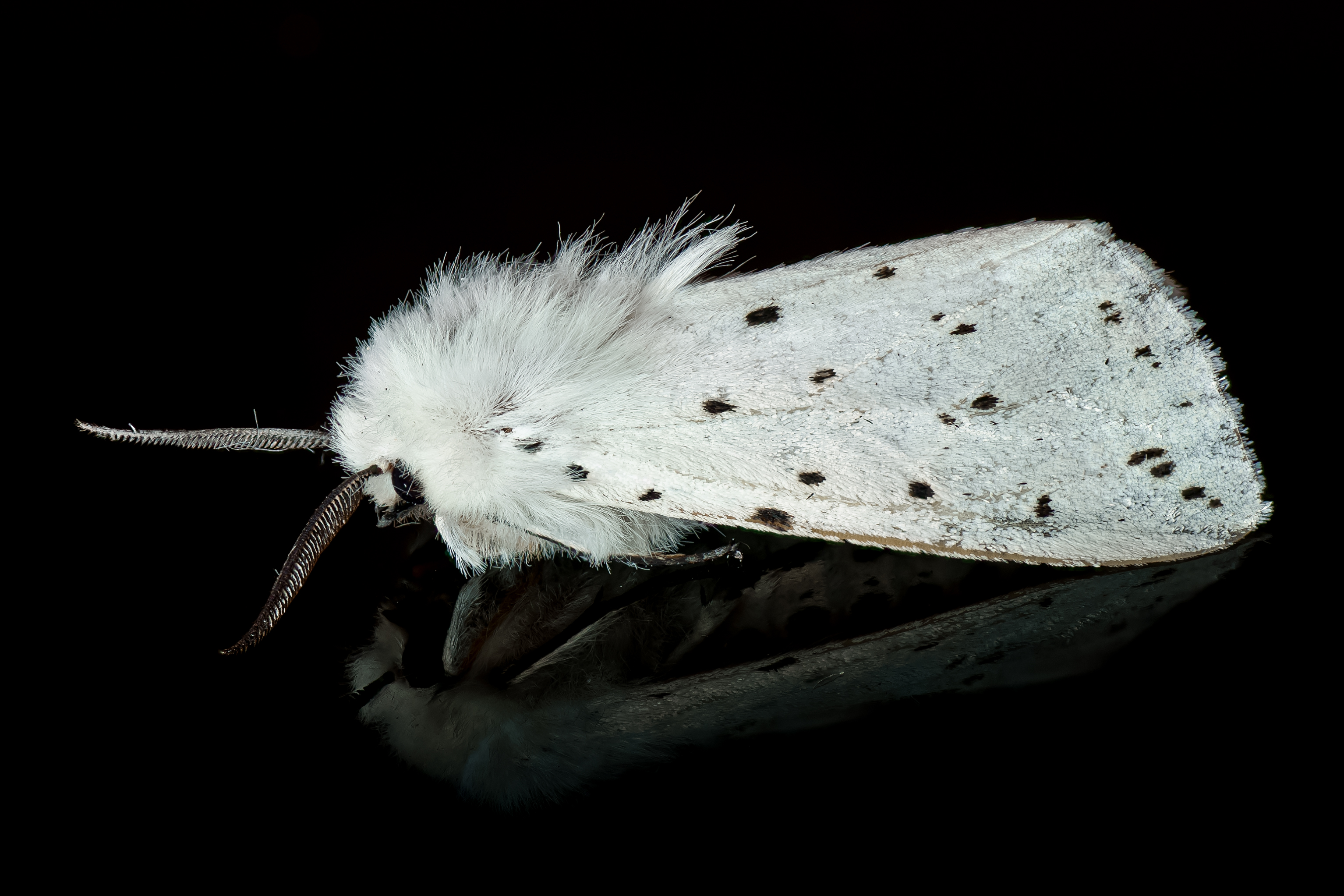

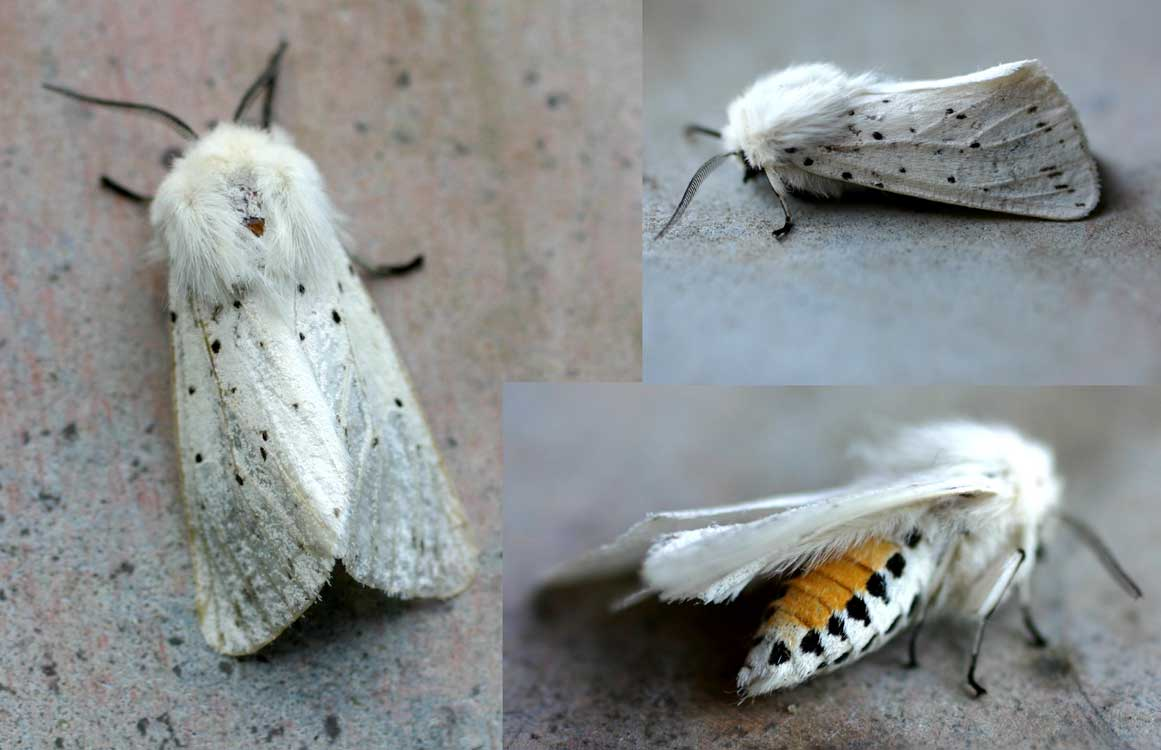

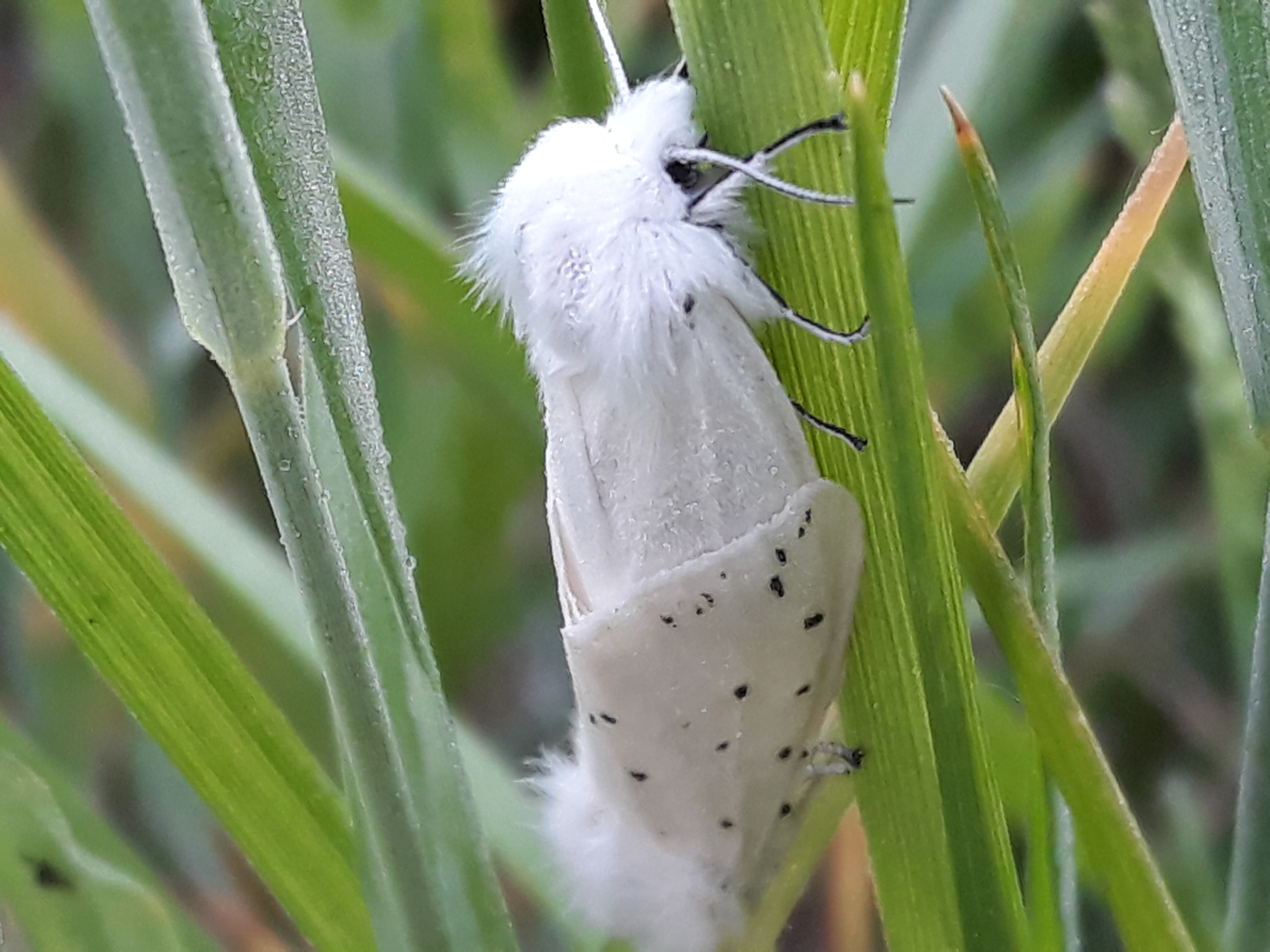

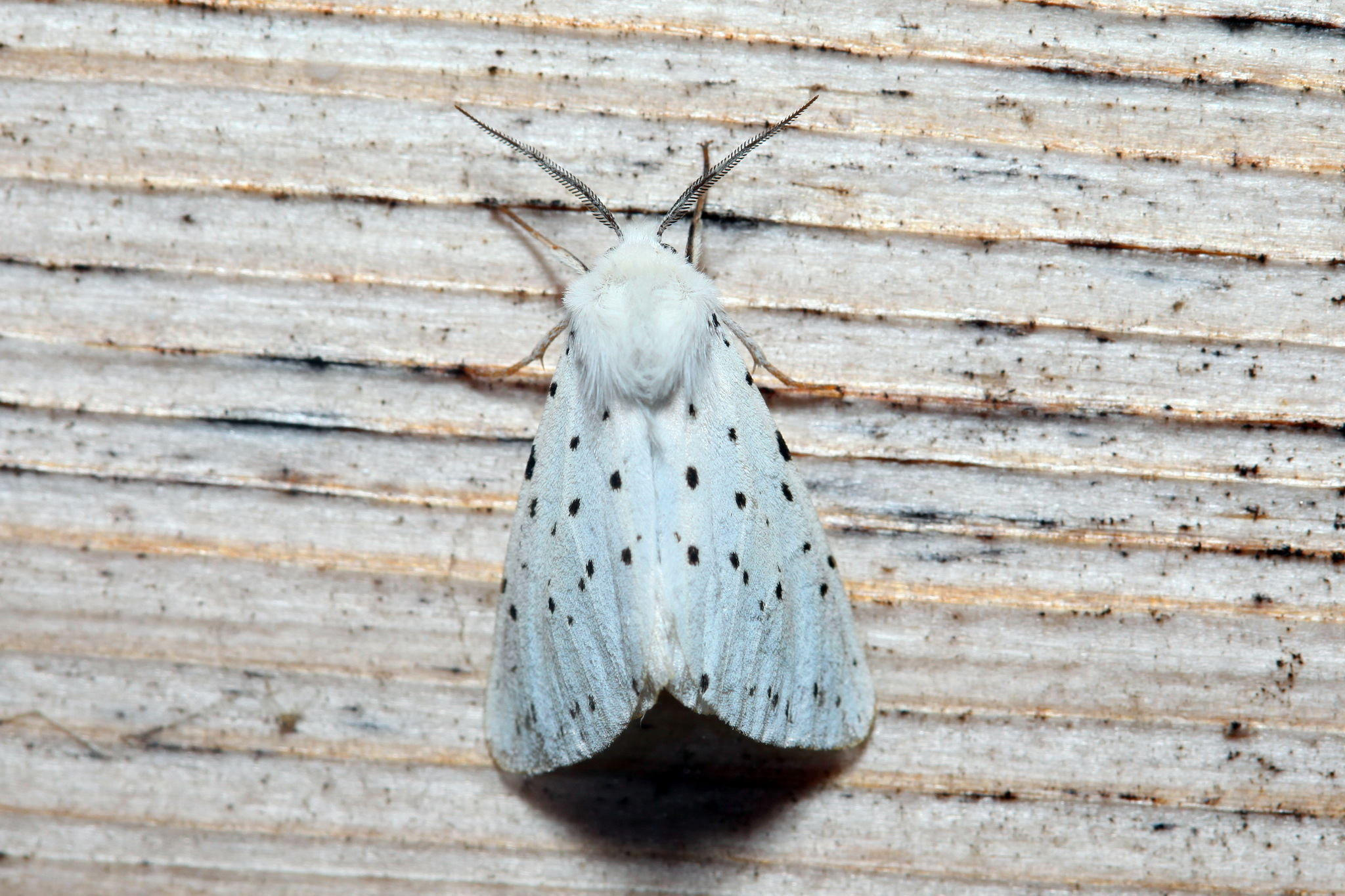

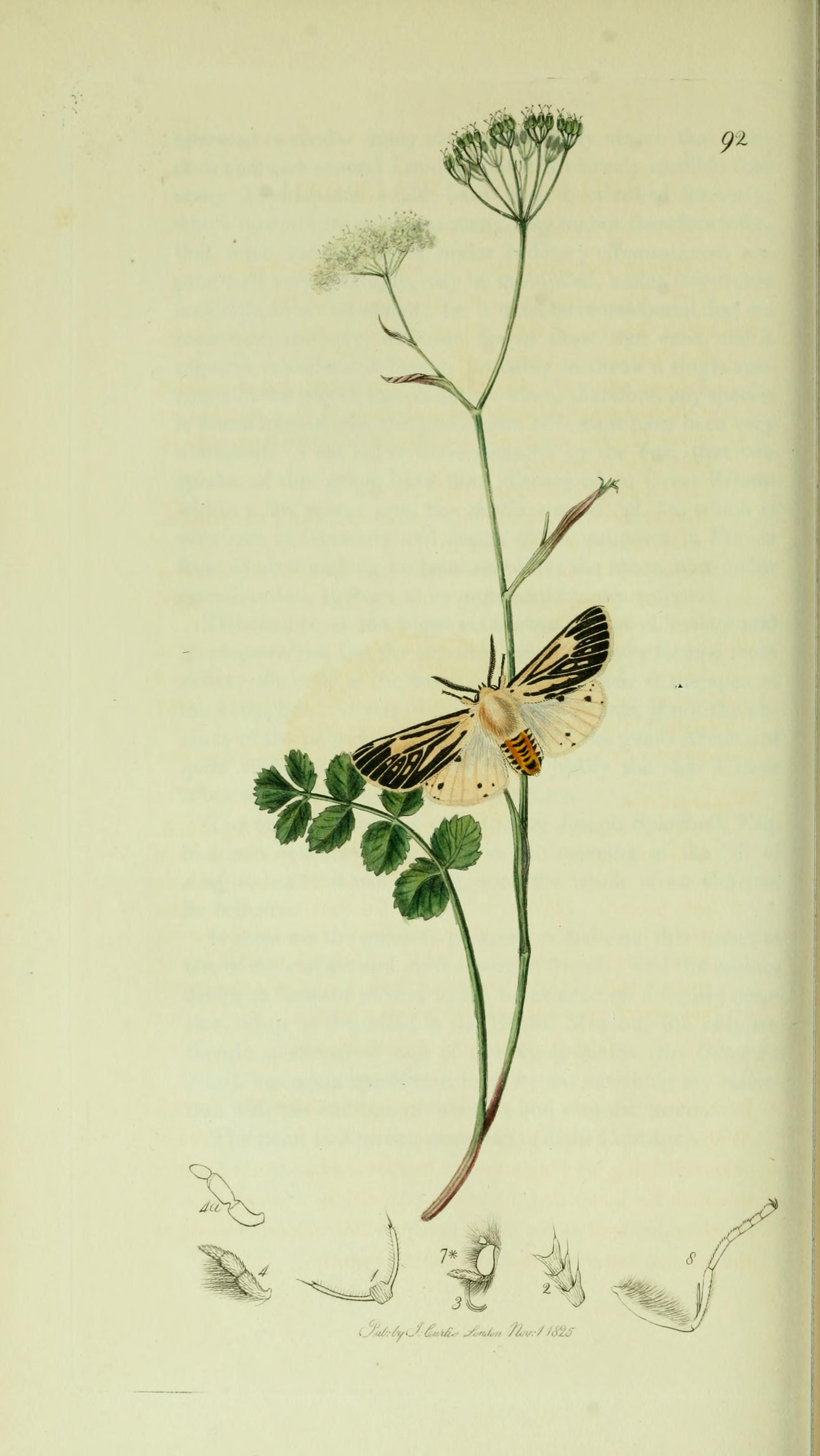
Illustration from John Curtis's British Entomology Volume 5

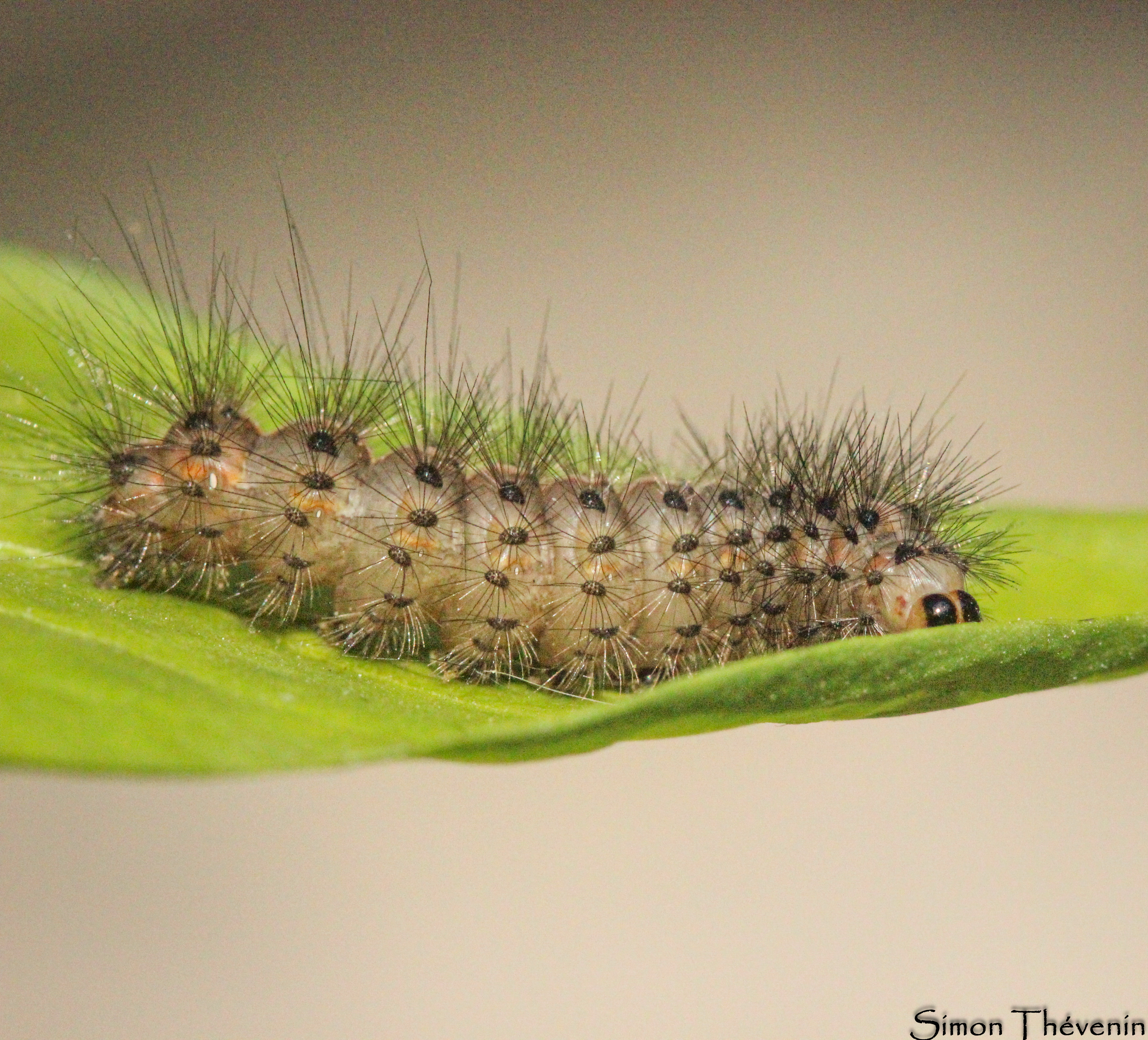

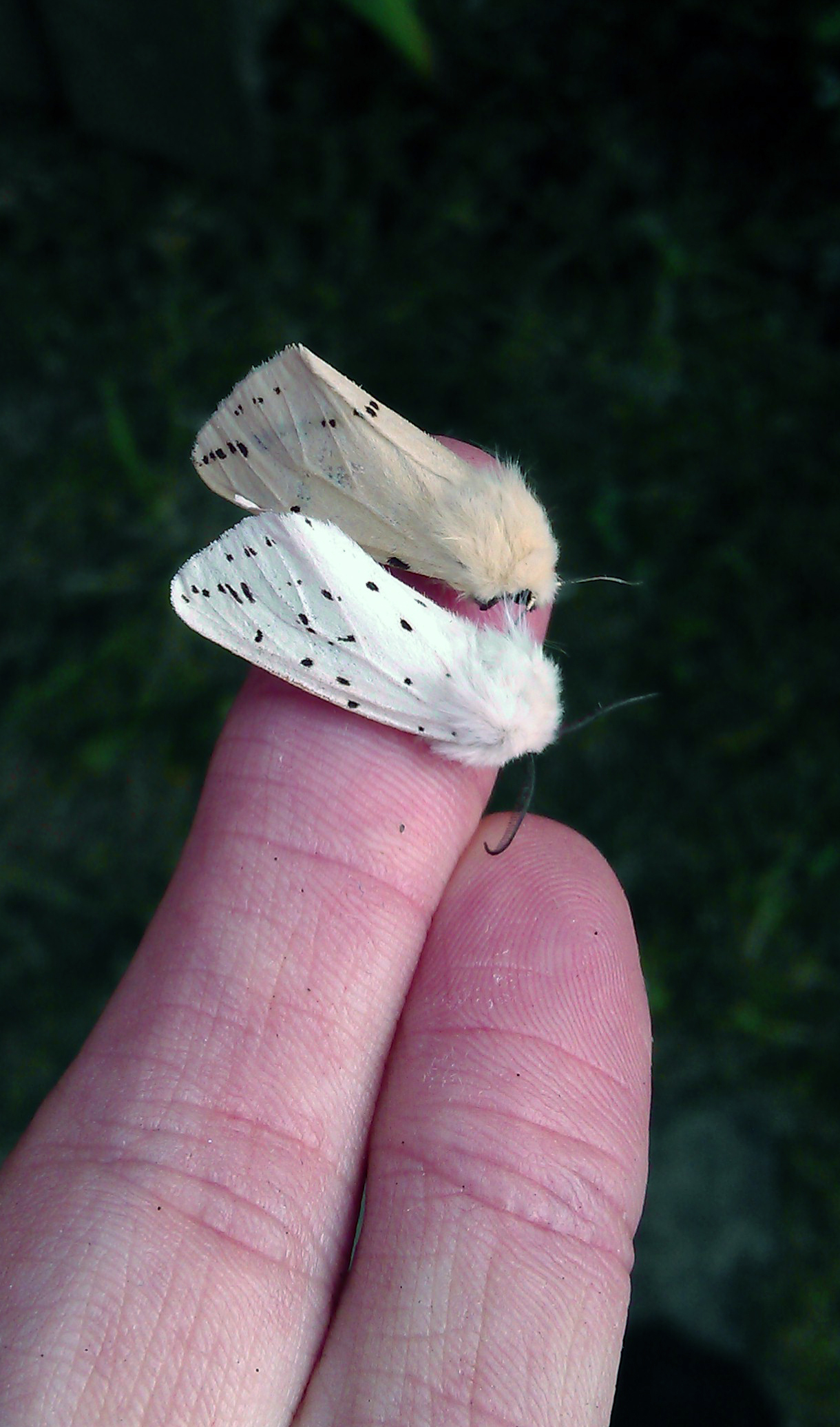

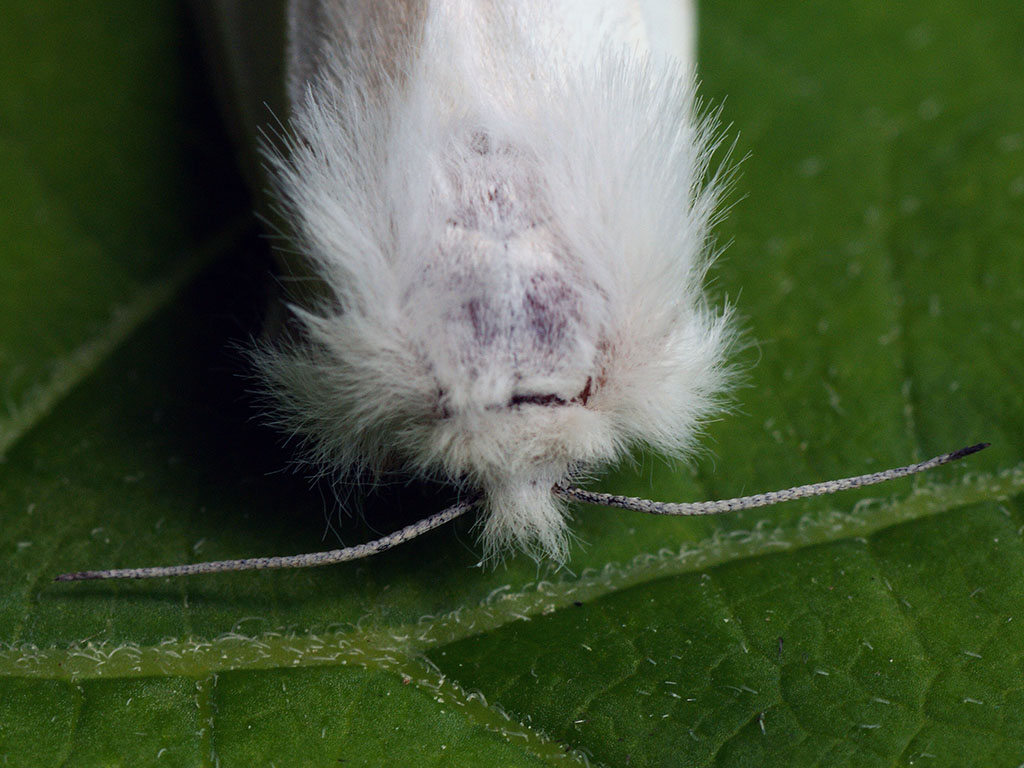

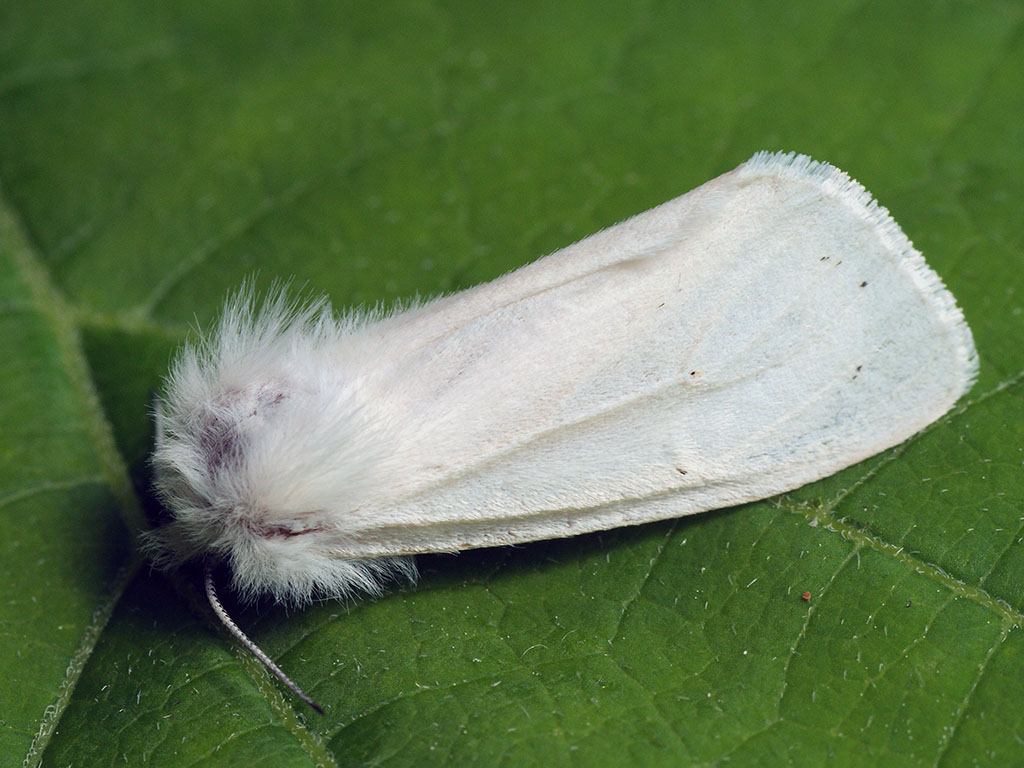

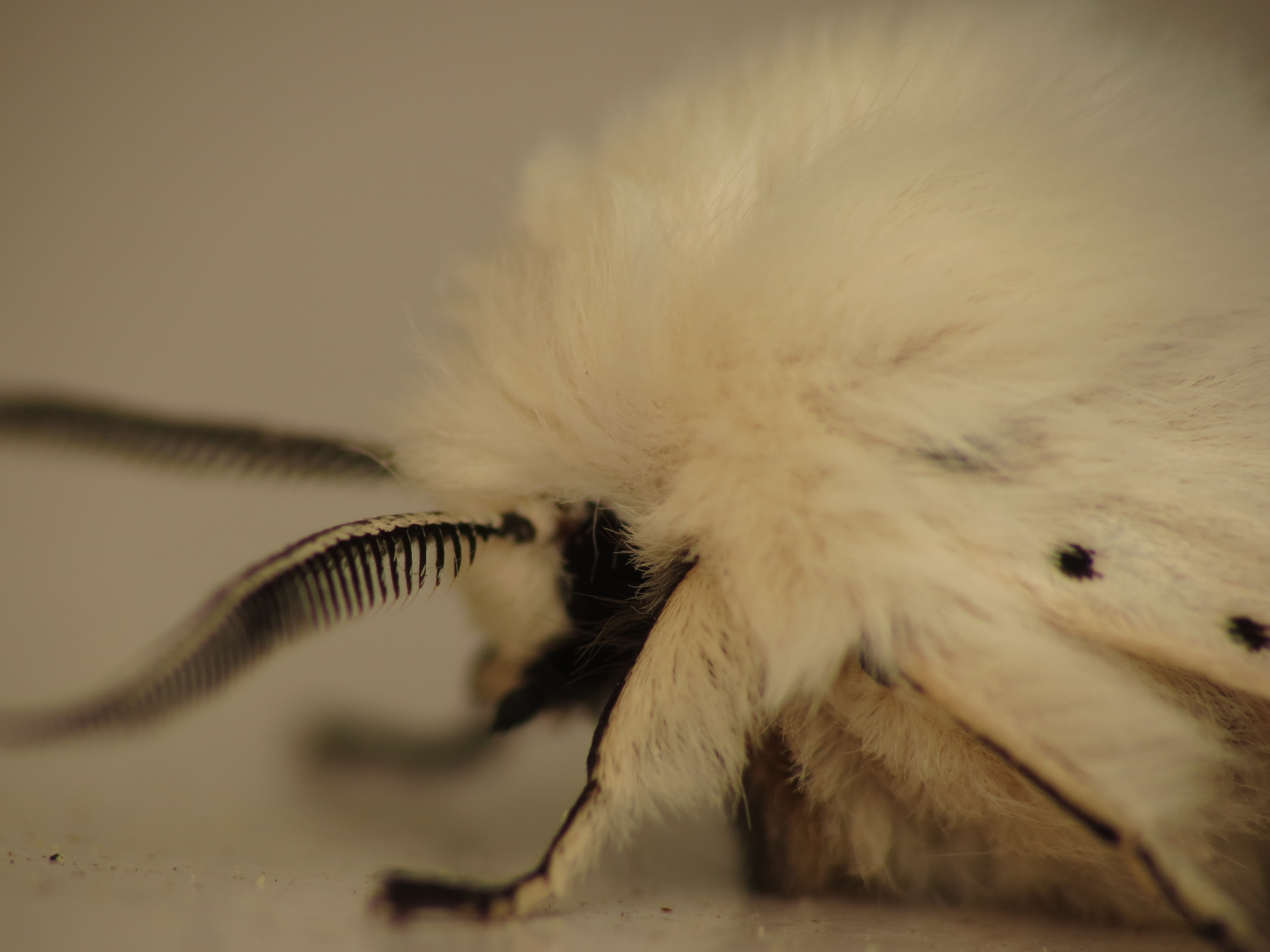

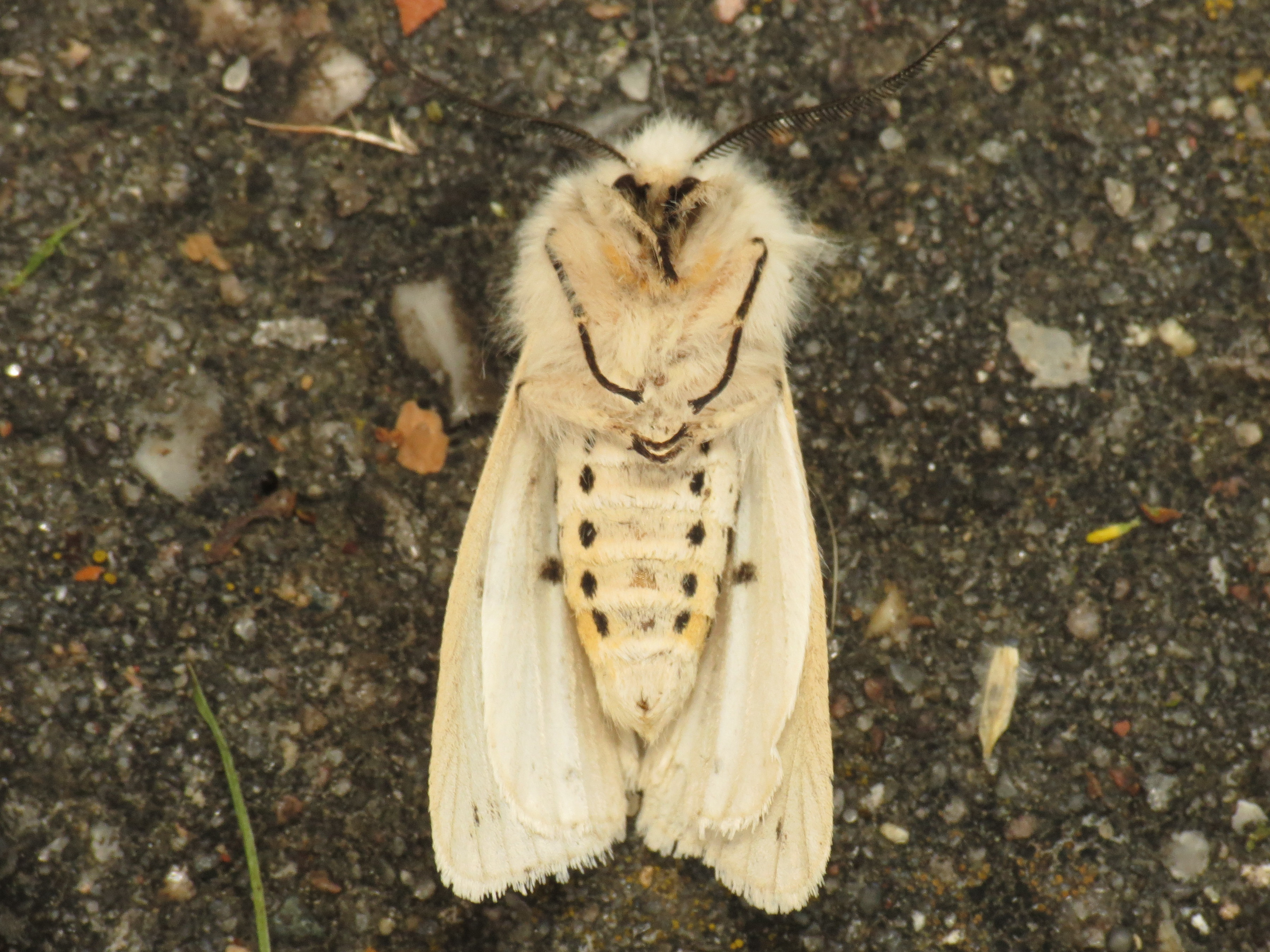

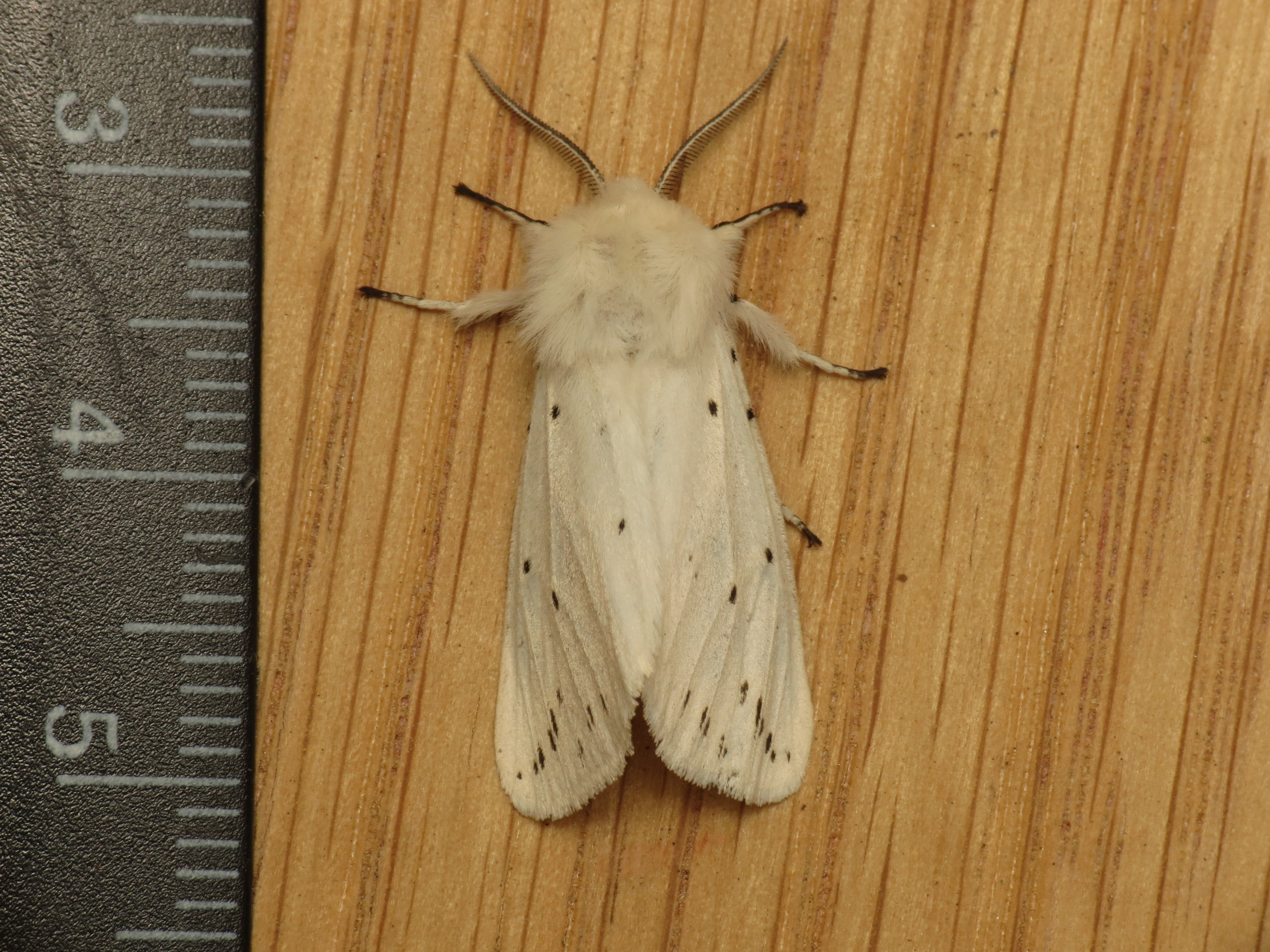

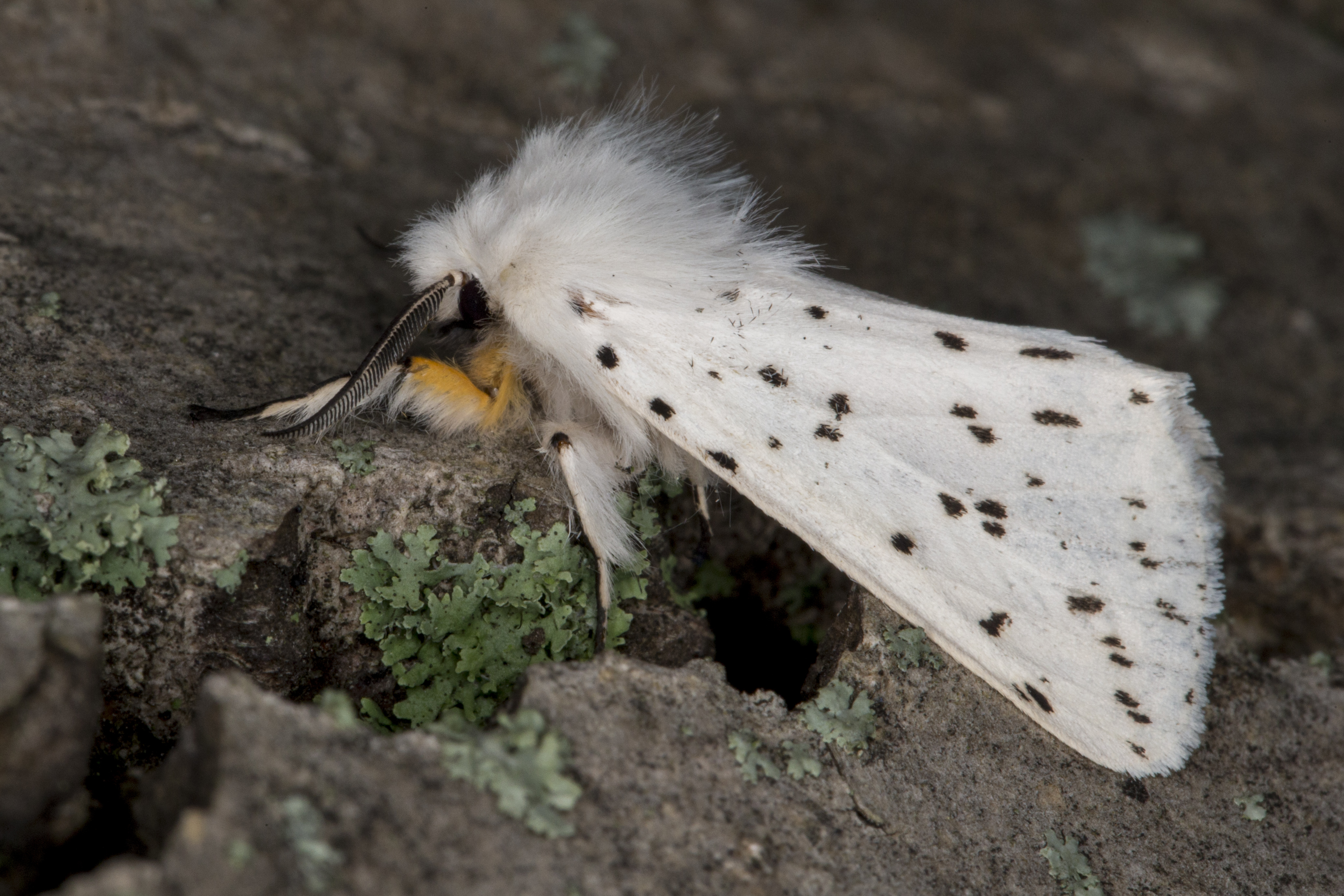

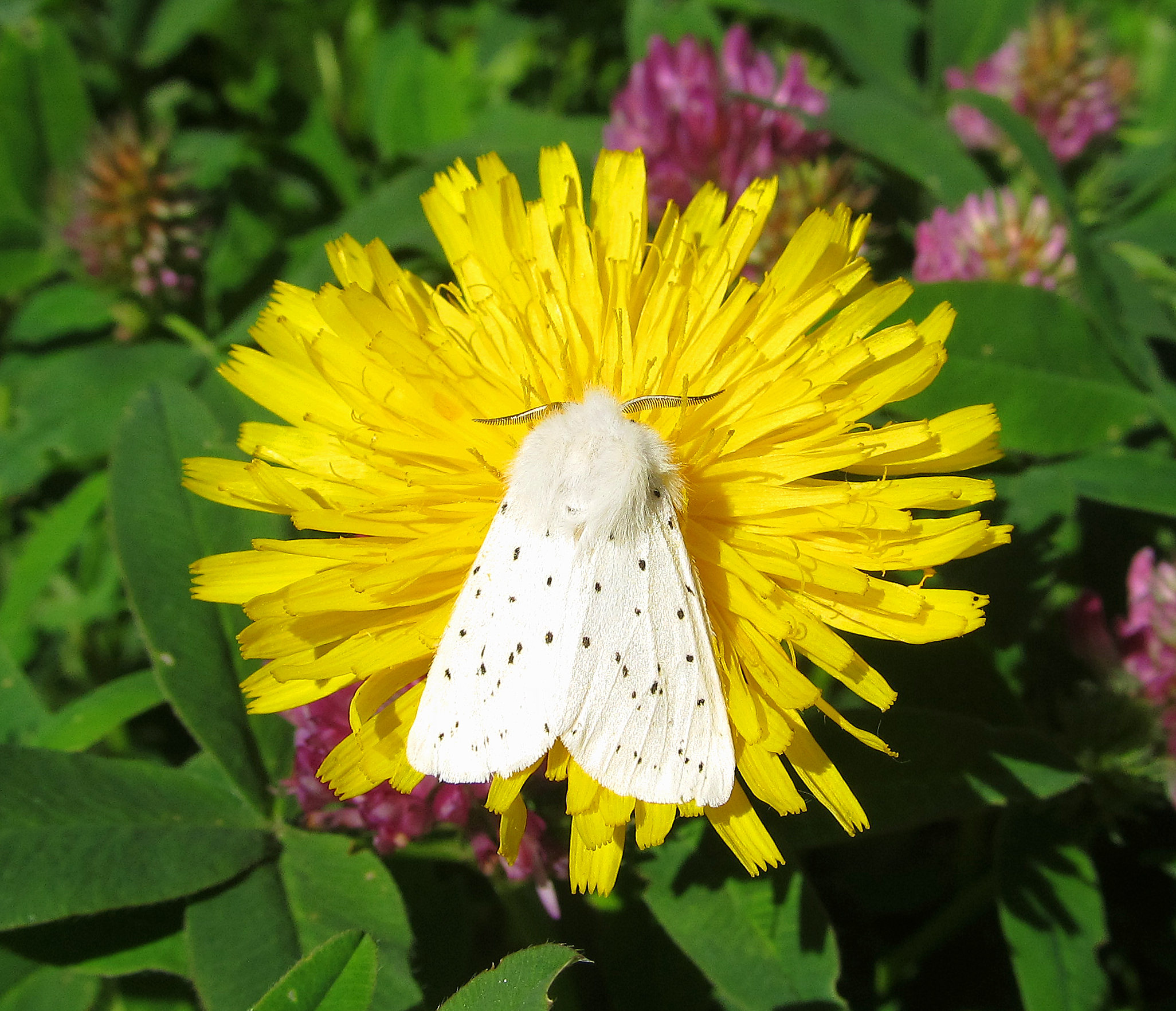

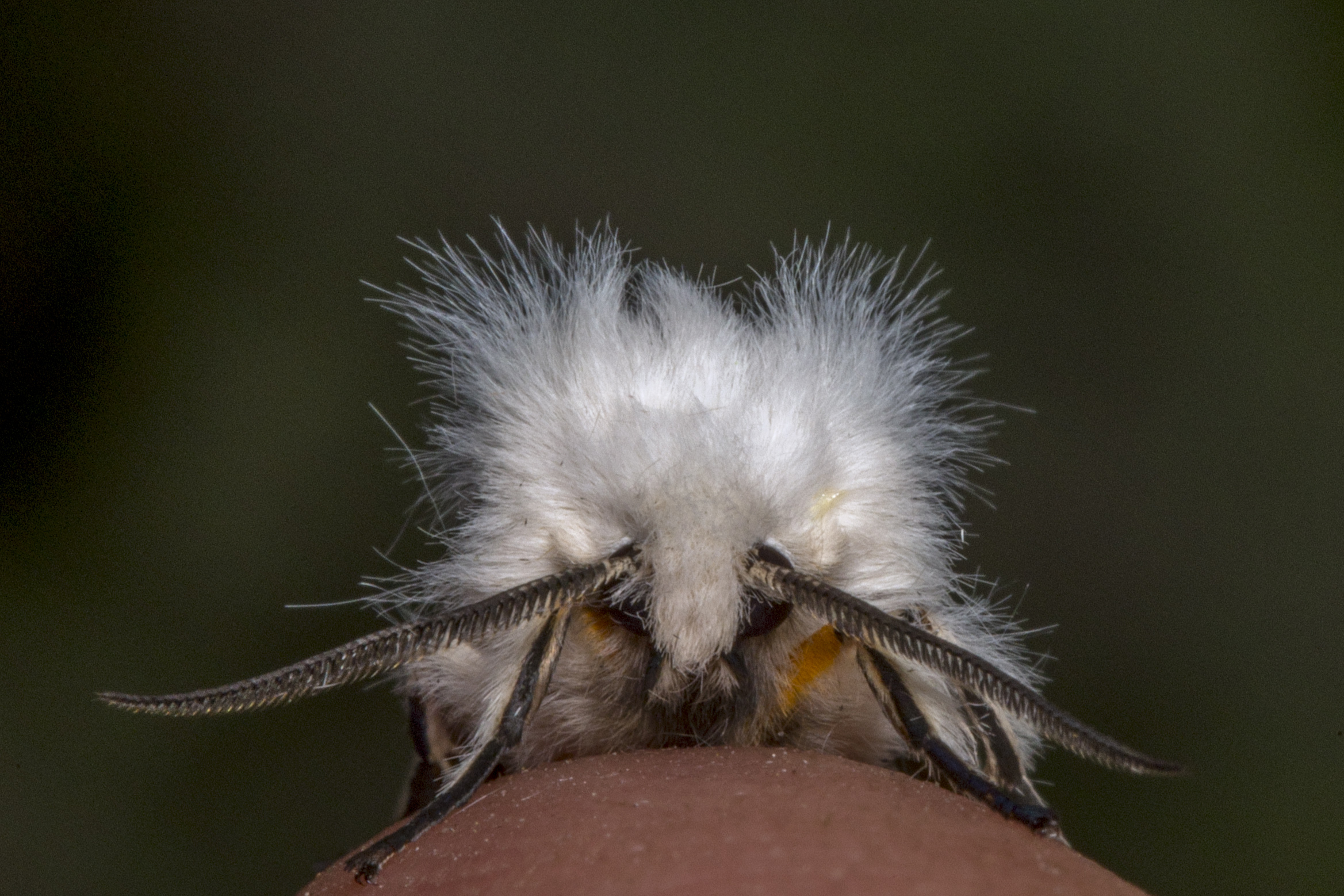

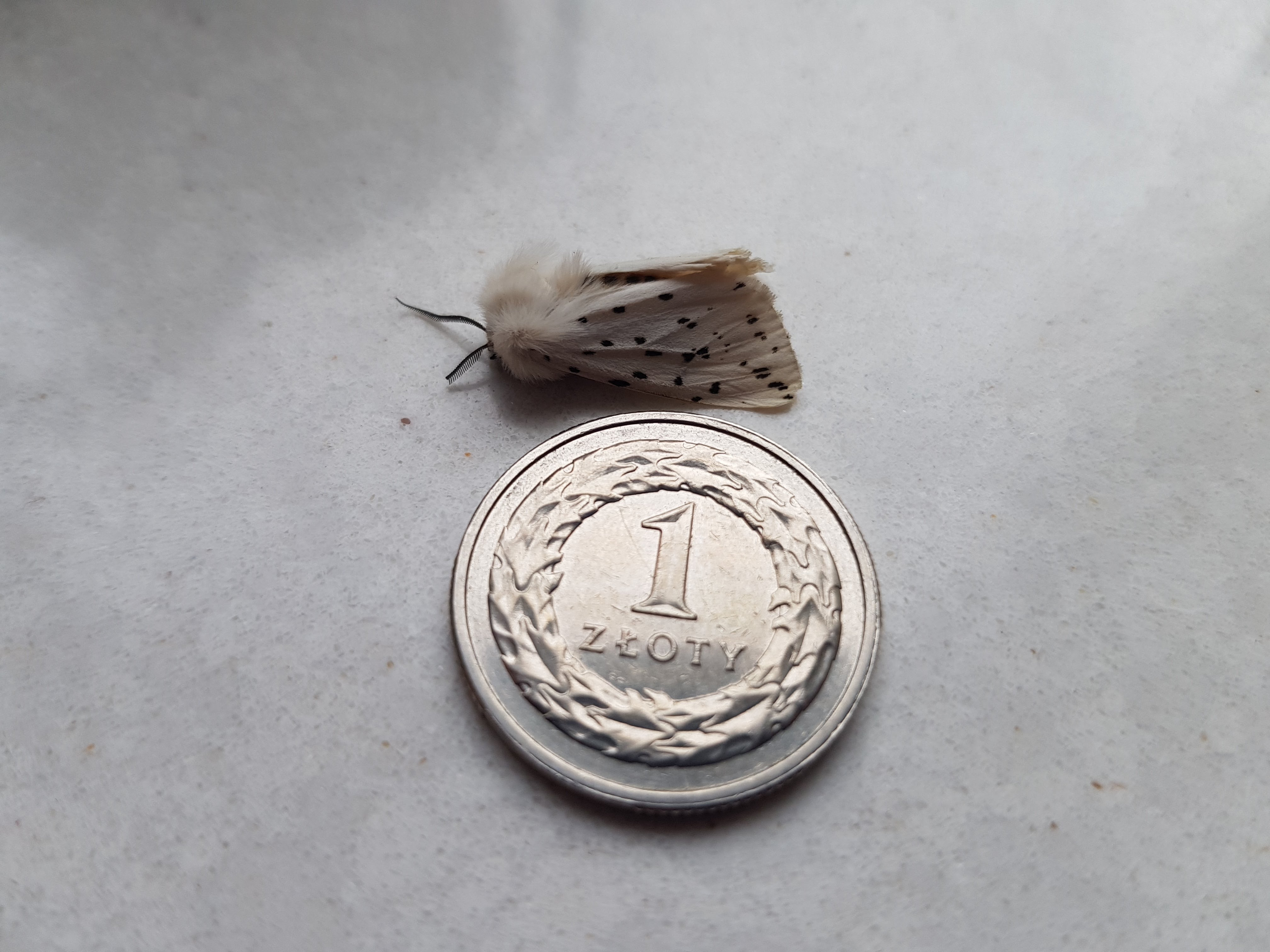

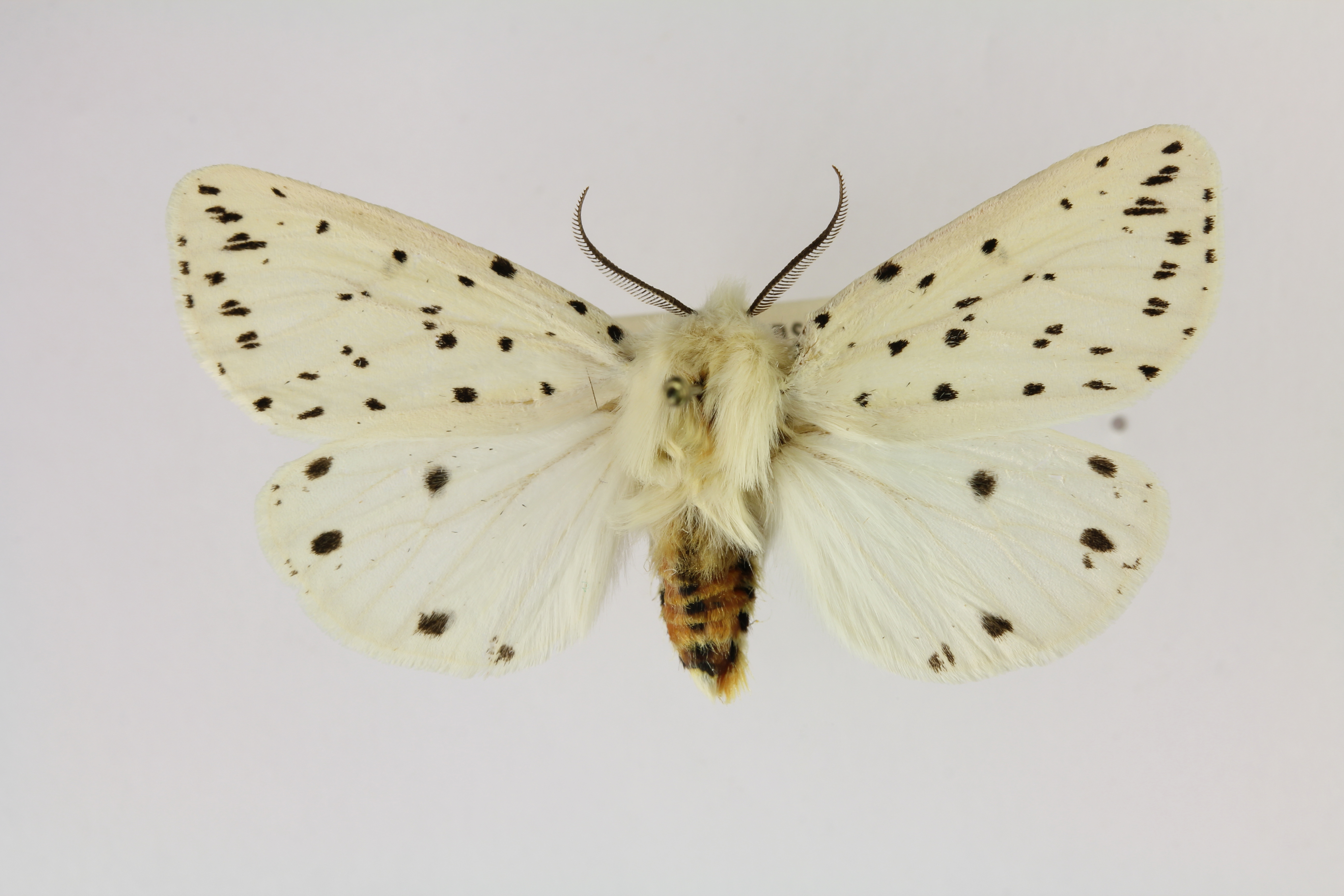

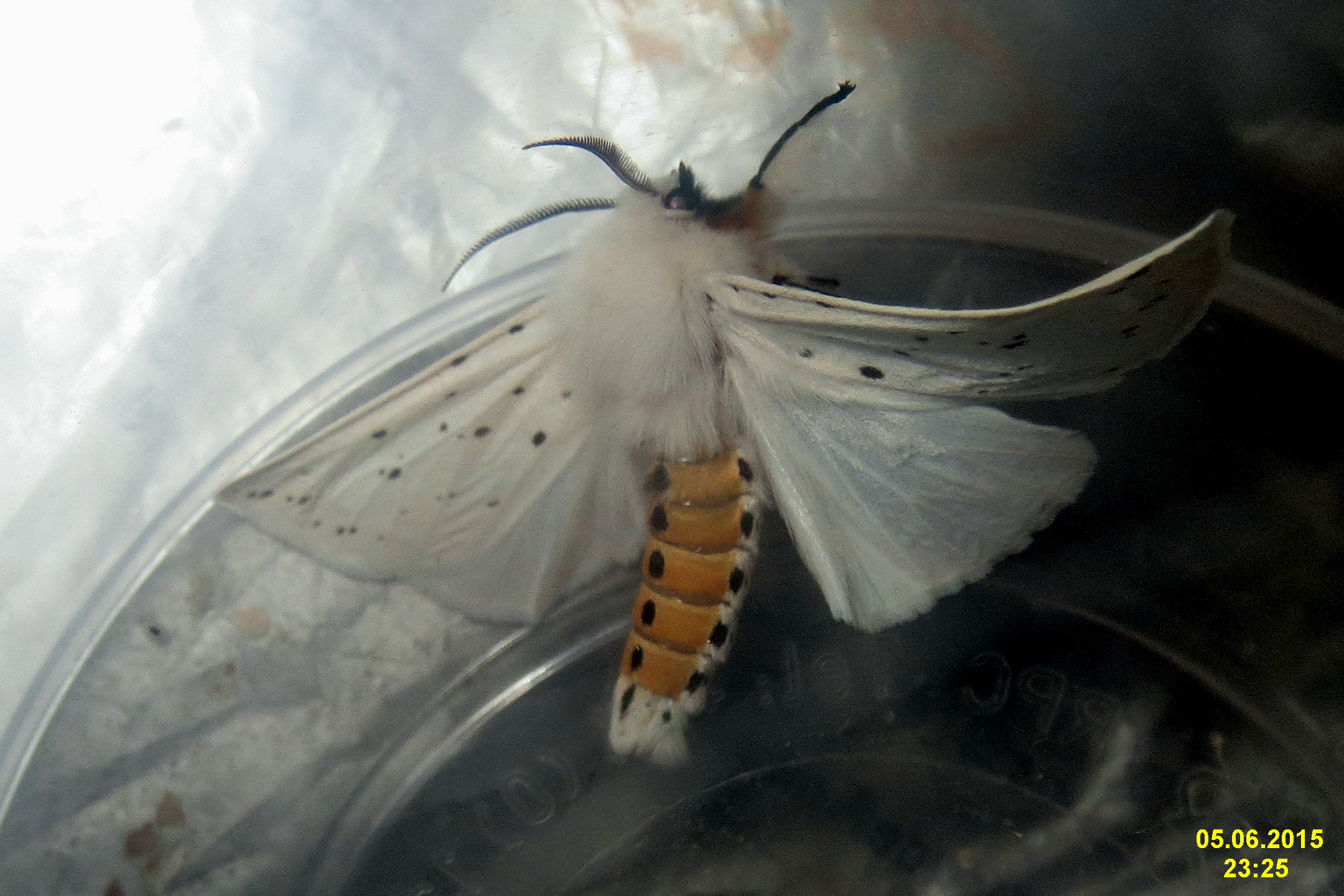

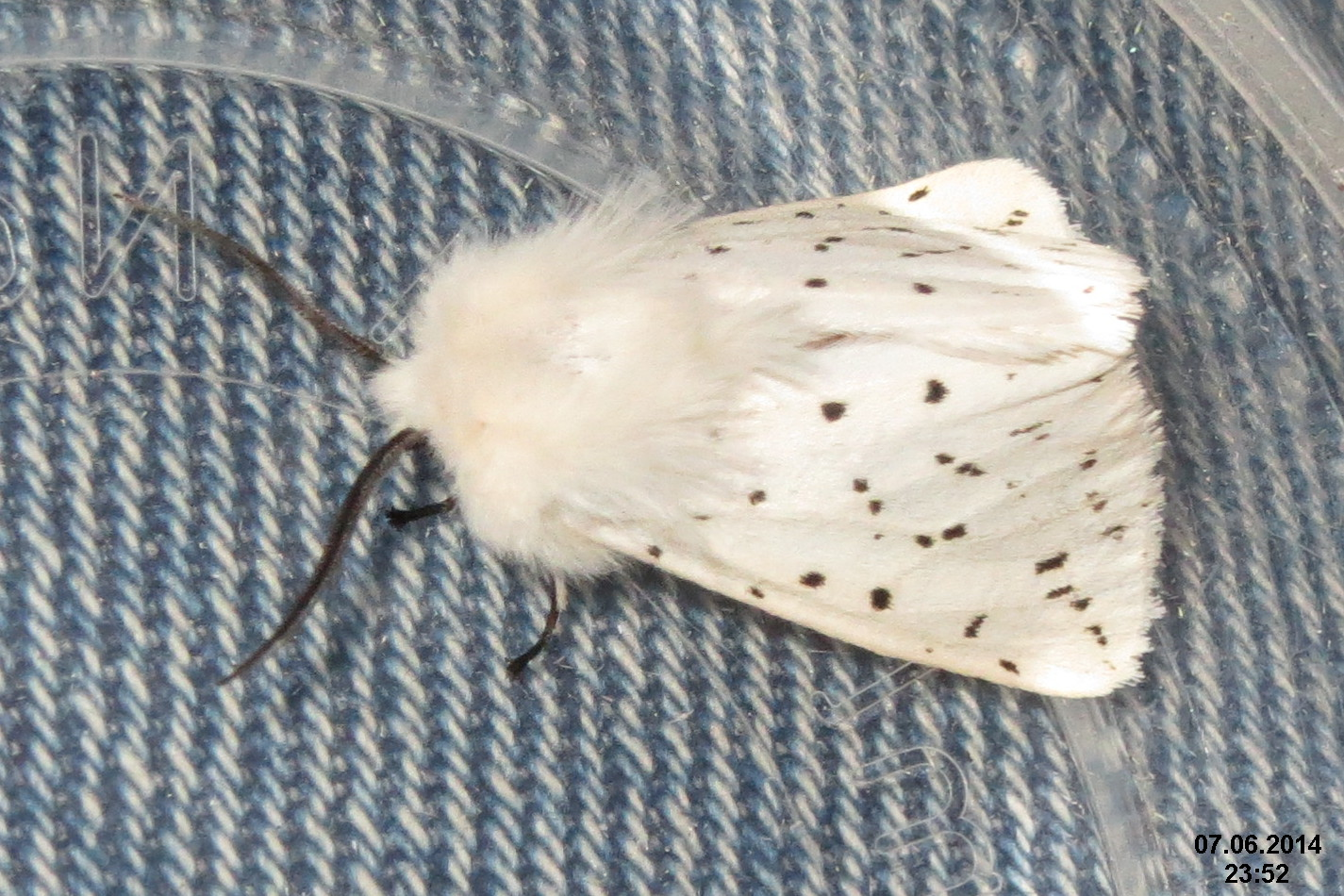

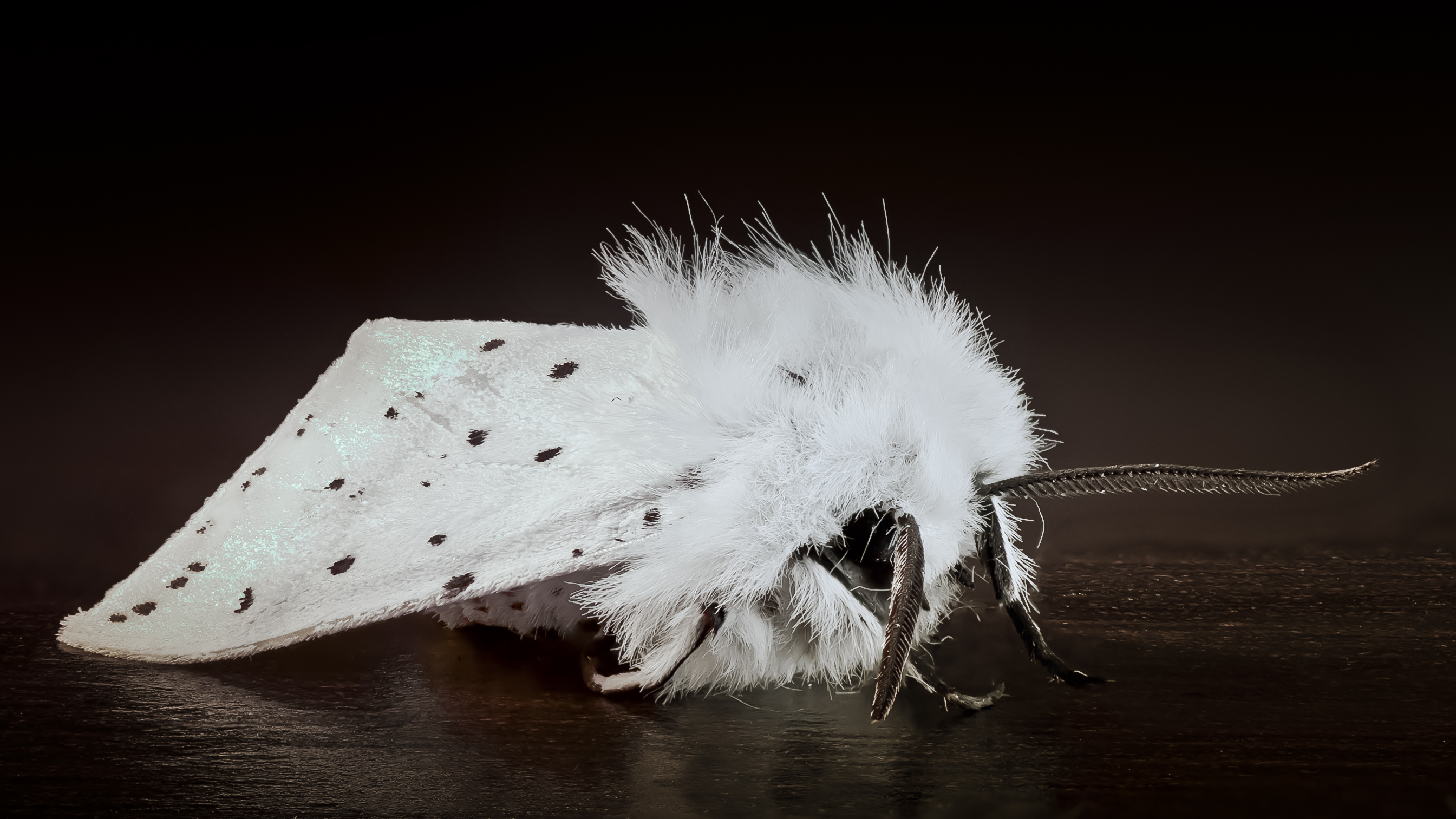
