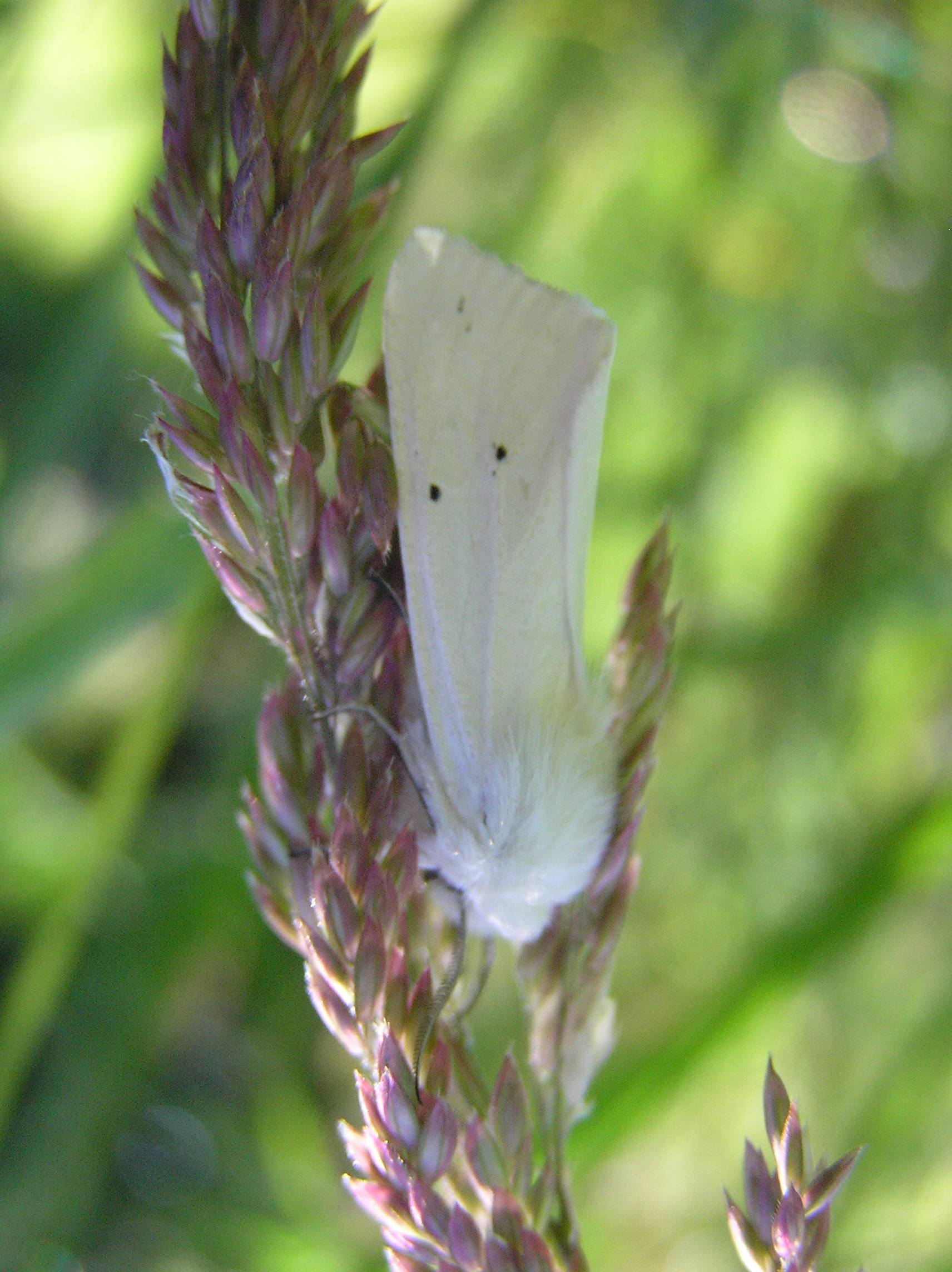

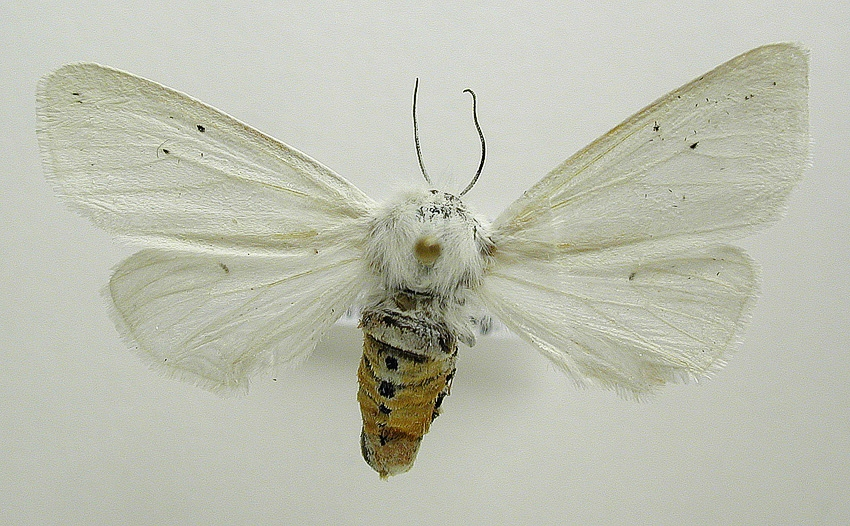

Scientific classification
- Domain: Eukaryota
- Kingdom: Animalia
- Phylum: Arthropoda
- Class: Insecta
- Order: Lepidoptera
- Superfamily: Noctuoidea
- Family: Erebidae
- Subfamily: Arctiinae
- Genus: Spilosoma
- Species: S. urticae

Binomial name
- Spilosoma urticae (Esper, 1789)

Synonyms
- Phalaena Bombyx urticae Esper, 1789; Phalaena Bombyx papyratia Marsham, 1791; Spilosoma sangaica Walker, [1865]; Spilosoma mandli Schawerda, 1922; Spilosoma urticae peralbata Dannehl, 1928

= Spilosoma urticae =

Water ermine

Species of moth

Spilosoma urticae, the water ermine, is a moth of the family Erebidae. It is found in temperate belt of the Palearctic realm like similar Spilosoma lubricipedum, but prefers drier biotopes. So, S. urticae is more abundant in steppes and it is the single Spilosoma species in Central Asia.

The wingspan is 38–46 mm. The length of the forewings is 18–22 mm. Hindwings always without black dots. Antennae branches are very short in males, they are equal and not more than twice longer than the antenna stem diameter (this is the best distinguishing character from Spilosoma lubricipeda). The moth flies April to October depending on the location.

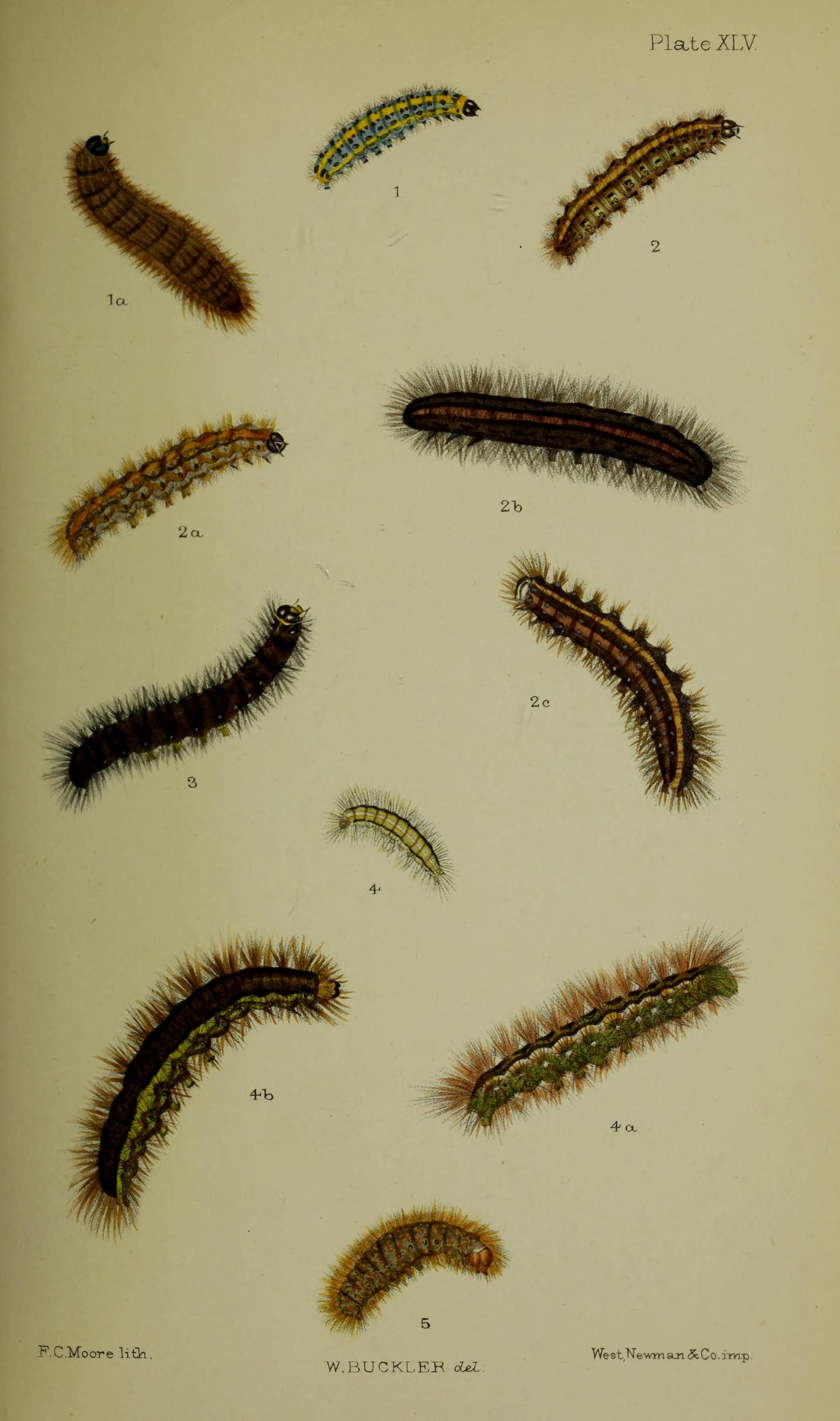
Fig. 3 larvae after last moult

The larvae feed on Rumex hydrolapathum, Mentha aquatica, Iris pseudacorus, Lysimachia vulgaris, Jacobaea vulgaris and Pedicularis sylvatica.
