= List of moths of Madagascar =

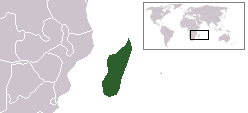
Location of Madagascar

There are about 2,680 known moth species of Madagascar. The moths (mostly nocturnal) and butterflies (mostly diurnal) together make up the taxonomic order Lepidoptera.

This is a list of moth species which have been recorded in Madagascar. They are listed alphabetically by family.

== Adelidae ==
- Adela gymnota (Meyrick, 1912)
- Adela janineae (Viette, 1954)
- Adela tsaratanana (Viette, 1954)

== Alucitidae ==
- Alucita dohertyi (Walsingham, 1909)
- Alucita euscripta Minet, 1976
- Alucita malawica Ustjuzhanin & Kovtunovich, 2016
- Alucita murzini Ustjuzhanin & Kovtunovich, 2016

== Arctiidae ==
- Amerila madagascariensis (Boisduval, 1847)
- Amerila vitrea Plötz, 1880
- Amphicallia pratti (Kenrick, 1914)
- Amsacta duberneti Toulgoët, 1968
- Argina amanda (Boisduval, 1847)
- Argina astrea (Drury, 1773)
- Astacosia lineata Toulgoët, 1966
- Astacosia oblonga (Toulgoët, 1955)
- Astacosia ornatrix Toulgoët, 1958
- Axiopoeniella laymerisa (Grandidier, 1867)
- Creatonotos perineti Rothschild, 1933
- Cyana amatura (Walker, 1863)
- Cyana grandis (Mabille, 1879)
- Cyana puella (Drury, 1773)
- Cyana saalmuelleri (Butler, 1882)
- Detoulgoetia aspersa (Mabille, 1879)
- Dubianaclia butleri (Mabille, 1882)
- Dubianaclia quinquemacula (Mabille, 1882)
- Eilema amaurobapha (Mabille, 1900)
- Eilema ardens (Butler, 1882)
- Eilema argentea (Butler, 1878)
- Eilema aspersa (Butler, 1882)
- Eilema bitincta Rothschild, 1924
- Eilema carnea (Butler, 1882)
- Eilema catenata (Mabille, 1900)
- Eilema cirrochroa (Mabille, 1900)
- Eilema cramboides Kenrick, 1914
- Eilema cribroides Kenrick, 1914
- Eilema croceibasis Toulgoët, 1955
- Eilema decaryi Toulgoët, 1955
- Eilema fasciatella Strand, 1922
- Eilema flammea (Mabille, 1885)
- Eilema flexistriata (Butler, 1882)
- Eilema inconspicualis Kenrick, 1914
- Eilema inornata Kenrick, 1914
- Eilema insignis (Butler, 1882)
- Eilema kingdoni (Butler, 1877)
- Eilema mabillei (Butler, 1882)
- Eilema maculosa (Saalmüller, 1884)
- Eilema marginata (Guérin-Méneville, 1844)
- Eilema nigrociliata Aurivillius, 1909
- Eilema nigrosparsa (Butler, 1882)
- Eilema notifera (Saalmüller, 1880)
- Eilema pallidicosta (Mabille, 1900)
- Eilema pauliani Toulgoët, 1955
- Eilema phantasma Toulgoët, 1955
- Eilema punctistriata (Butler, 1882)
- Eilema quadrangula Toulgoët, 1955
- Eilema simulatricula Toulgoët, 1955
- Eilema sordida (Butler, 1882)
- Eilema trispilota (Saalmüller, 1880)
- Eilema umbrigera (Mabille, 1900)
- Eilema voeltzkowi Aurivillius, 1909
- Euchromia amoena (Möschler, 1872)
- Euchromia folletii (Guérin-Méneville, 1832)
- Euchromia madagascariensis (Boisduval, 1833)
- Exilisia andriai (Toulgoët, 1955)
- Exilisia bijuga (Mabille, 1899)
- Exilisia bilineata (Toulgoët, 1954)
- Exilisia bipuncta (Hampson, 1900)
- Exilisia costimacula Tougoët, 1958
- Exilisia falcata (Toulgoët, 1954)
- Exilisia flavicapilla (Toulgoët, 1954)
- Exilisia flavicincta Toulgoët, 1965
- Exilisia fletcheri (Toulgoët, 1956)
- Exilisia lichenaria (Toulgoët, 1954)
- Exilisia m-nigrum (Mabille, 1899)
- Exilisia mabillei Tougoët, 1958
- Exilisia marmorea (Butler, 1882)
- Exilisia nebulosa Toulgoët, 1958
- Exilisia obliterata Toulgoët, 1958
- Exilisia ocularis (Toulgoët, 1953)
- Exilisia olivascens (Toulgoët, 1954)
- Exilisia parvula (Butler, 1882)
- Exilisia perlucida (Toulgoët, 1954)
- Exilisia placida (Butler, 1882)
- Exilisia pluripunctata (Mabille, 1900)
- Exilisia pseudomarmorea Toulgoët, 1958
- Exilisia pseudoplacida Toulgoët, 1958
- Exilisia punctata (Hampson, 1900)
- Exilisia rufescens Toulgoët, 1958
- Exilisia viettei Toulgoët, 1958
- Fletcherinia decaryi Griveaud, 1964
- Fodinoidea formosa Toulgoët, 1984
- Fodinoidea pluto Toulgoët, 1961
- Fodinoidea pulchra Tougoët, 1971
- Fodinoidea rectifasciata Collenette, 1930
- Fodinoidea staudingeri Saalmüller, 1884
- Fodinoidea vectigera (Mabille, 1882)
- Galtara extensa (Butler, 1880)
- Galtarodes ragonoti (Mabille, 1880)
- Isorropus funeralis (Kenrick, 1914)
- Isorropus lateritea Toulgoët, 1957
- Isorropus sanguinolenta (Mabille, 1878)
- Isorropus splendidus Toulgoët, 1957
- Isorropus tricolor Butler, 1880
- Laelapia notata Butler, 1879
- Leucaloa infragyrea (Saalmüller, 1891)
- Maculonaclia agatha (Oberthür, 1893)
- Maculonaclia altitudina Griveaud, 1964
- Maculonaclia ankasoka Griveaud, 1964
- Maculonaclia bicolor (Rothschild, 1911)
- Maculonaclia bicolorata Griveaud, 1967
- Maculonaclia brevipennis Griveaud, 1964
- Maculonaclia buntzae Griveaud, 1964
- Maculonaclia delicata Griveaud, 1964
- Maculonaclia dentata Griveaud, 1964
- Maculonaclia douquettae Griveaud, 1973
- Maculonaclia elongata Griveaud, 1964
- Maculonaclia flamea Griveaud, 1967
- Maculonaclia griveaudi Viette, 1987
- Maculonaclia grjebinei Griveaud, 1964
- Maculonaclia itsikiorya Griveaud, 1969
- Maculonaclia lambertoni Griveaud, 1964
- Maculonaclia leopardina (Rothschild, 1911)
- Maculonaclia lokoba Griveaud, 1964
- Maculonaclia matsabory Griveaud, 1967
- Maculonaclia minuscula Griveaud, 1973
- Maculonaclia muscella (Mabille, 1884)
- Maculonaclia nigrita Griveaud, 1964
- Maculonaclia obliqua Griveaud, 1964
- Maculonaclia obscura Griveaud, 1967
- Maculonaclia parvifenestrata Griveaud, 1964
- Maculonaclia petrusia Griveaud, 1967
- Maculonaclia sanctamaria Griveaud, 1964
- Maculonaclia tampoketsya Griveaud, 1969
- Maculonaclia tenera (Mabille, 1879)
- Maculonaclia truncata Griveaud, 1964
- Maculonaclia viettei Griveaud, 1964
- Madagascarctia cellularis (Toulgoët, 1954)
- Madagascarctia feminina Gaede, 1923
- Madagascarctia madagascariensis (Butler, 1882)
- Melanonaclia luctuosa (Oberthür, 1911)
- Melanonaclia lugens (Oberthür, 1893)
- Melanonaclia moerens (Oberthür, 1911)
- Melanonaclia perplexa Griveaud, 1964
- Microhyle fadella (Mabille, 1882)
- Microhyle leopardella Toulgoët, 1972
- Microhyle macularia Toulgoët, 1976
- Microhyle viettei Toulgoët, 1976
- Micronaclia imaitsia Griveaud, 1964
- Micronaclia simplex (Butler, 1879)
- Mimulosa proxima (Toulgoët, 1955)
- Mimulosa pseudotortrix (Toulgoët, 1955)
- Mimulosa rotunda (Toulgoët, 1955)
- Mimulosa tortricoides (Toulgoët, 1955)
- Myopsyche alluaudi (Oberthür, 1911)
- Myopsyche blandina (Oberthür, 1893)
- Neuroxena auremaculatus (Rothschild, 1933)
- Neuroxena lasti (Rothschild, 1910)
- Neuroxena rubriceps (Mabille, 1879)
- Neuroxena simulans Toulgoët, 1971
- Nyctemera biformis Mabille, 1878
- Nyctemera crassiantennata Oberthür, 1916
- Nyctemera gracilis Saalmüller, 1884
- Nyctemera insulare (Boisduval, 1833)
- Nyctemera virgo (Strand, 1909)
- Ochrota arida (Toulgoët, 1955)
- Ochrota bicoloria Toulgoët, 1958
- Ochrota bipuncta (Hampson, 1900)
- Ochrota convergens Toulgoët, 1956
- Ochrota dissimilis Toulgoët, 1956
- Ochrota malagassa (Strand, 1912)
- Ochrota nigrolimbata Toulgoët, 1965
- Ochrota septentrionalis Tougoët, 1956
- Ochrota unicolor (Hopffer, 1857)
- Paraona bicolor Toulgoët, 1968
- Paraona cocciniceps (Mabille, 1884)
- Parasiccia ochrorubens (Mabille, 1900)
- Pelosia amaurobapha (Mabille, 1900)
- Pelosia plumosa (Mabille, 1900)
- Phryganopsis plumosa Mabille, 1900
- Phryganopteryx convergens Toulgoët, 1959
- Phryganopteryx formosa Toulgoët, 1959
- Phryganopteryx griveaudi Toulgoët, 1959
- Phryganopteryx incerta Toulgoët, 1972
- Phryganopteryx inexpectata Rothschild, 1931
- Phryganopteryx intermedia Toulgoët, 1965
- Phryganopteryx lemairei Toulgoët, 1973
- Phryganopteryx nebulosa Toulgoët, 1959
- Phryganopteryx occidentalis Toulgoët, 1959
- Phryganopteryx pauliani Toulgoët, 1971
- Phryganopteryx perineti Rothschild, 1933
- Phryganopteryx postexcisa Rothschild, 1935
- Phryganopteryx rectangulata Kenrick, 1914
- Phryganopteryx rothschildi Toulgoët, 1959
- Phryganopteryx saalmuelleri Rothschild, 1924
- Phryganopteryx sogai Toulgoët, 1959
- Phryganopteryx strigilata (Saalmüller, 1878)
- Phryganopteryx triangularis Toulgoët, 1957
- Phryganopteryx viettei Toulgoët, 1961
- Phryganopteryx watsoni Toulgoët, 1977
- Proxhyle cinerascens Toulgoët, 1959
- Proxhyle vadoni Toulgoët, 1953
- Secusio gaetana Oberthür, 1923
- Siccia decolorata Toulgoët, 1954
- Siccia sordida (Butler, 1877)
- Soganaclia roedereri Griveaud, 1970
- Soganaclia tsaratananae Griveaud, 1970
- Soganaclia viridisparsa Griveaud, 1964
- Spilosoma brunneomixta Toulgoët, 1971
- Spilosoma griveaudi (Toulgoët, 1956)
- Spilosoma hercules (Toulgoët, 1956)
- Spilosoma luteoradians (Toulgoët, 1954)
- Spilosoma mediocinerea (Toulgoët, 1956)
- Spilosoma melanimon (Mabille, 1880)
- Spilosoma milloti (Toulgoët, 1954)
- Spilosoma nigrocincta (Kenrick, 1914)
- Spilosoma pauliani (Toulgoët, 1956)
- Spilosoma pseudambrensis (Toulgoët, 1961)
- Spilosoma turlini Toulgoët, 1973
- Spilosoma viettei (Toulgoët, 1954)
- Spilosoma vieui (Toulgoët, 1956)
- Stictonaclia amplificata (Saalmüller, 1880)
- Stictonaclia anastasia (Oberthür, 1893)
- Stictonaclia blandina (Oberthür, 1893)
- Stictonaclia myodes (Guérin-Méneville, 1832)
- Stictonaclia reducta (Mabille, 1879)
- Tenuinaclia oberthueri (Rothschild, 1911)
- Thumatha fuscescens Walker, 1866
- Thumatha infantula (Saalmüller, 1880)
- Thyrosticta bruneata Griveaud, 1969
- Thyrosticta contigua (Saalmüller, 1884)
- Thyrosticta dujardini Griveaud, 1969
- Thyrosticta melanisa Griveaud, 1969
- Thyrosticta minuta (Boisduval, 1833)
- Thyrosticta peyrierasi Griveaud, 1969
- Thyrosticta sylvicolens (Butler, 1878)
- Thyrosticta tollini (Keferstein, 1870)
- Thyrosticta trimacula (Mabille, 1879)
- Tritonaclia kefersteinii (Butler, 1882)
- Tritonaclia melania (Oberthür, 1923)
- Tritonaclia quinquepunctata Griveaud, 1967
- Tritonaclia stephania (Oberthür, 1923)
- Tsarafidynia blanci Griveaud, 1974
- Tsarafidynia perpusilla (Mabille, 1880)
- Tsirananaclia formosa Griveaud, 1973
- Tsirananaclia milloti Griveaud, 1964
- Utetheisa diva (Mabille, 1880)
- Utetheisa elata (Fabricius, 1798)
- Utetheisa lotrix (Cramer, 1779)
- Utetheisa pulchella (Linnaeus, 1758)
- Viettesia plumicornis (Butler, 1882)
- Vitronaclia veronica (Oberthür, 1893)

== Argyresthiidae ==
- Argyresthia andrianella Gibeaux, 1983
- Argyresthia bobyella Gibeaux, 1983
- Argyresthia flavipes Gibeaux, 1983
- Argyresthia inexpectella Gibeaux, 1983
- Argyresthia italaviana Gibeaux, 1983
- Argyresthia pumilella Gibeaux, 1983
- Argyresthia pusiella Gibeaux, 1983
- Argyresthia resplenderella Gibeaux, 1983
- Argyresthia tristella Gibeaux, 1983

== Autostichidae ==
- Encrasima insularis (Butler, 1880)
- Pachnistis nigropunctella Viette, 1955

== Bombycidae ==
- Ocinara malagasy Viette, 1965

== Brachodidae ==
- Nigilgia seyrigella Viette, 1955
- Nigilgia toulgoetella Viette, 1955
- Pseudocossus boisduvalii Viette, 1955
- Pseudocossus uliginosus Kenrick, 1914

== Callidulidae ==
- Caloschemia pulchra (Butler, 1878)
- Griveaudia charlesi Viette, 1968
- Griveaudia nigropuncta Viette, 1958
- Griveaudia vieui Viette, 1958
- Pterothysanus pictus Butler, 1884

== Carposinidae ==
- Meridarchis unitacta Diakonoff, 1970

== Choreutidae ==
- Tebenna micalis (Mann, 1857)

== Coleophoridae ==
- Coleophora leucobela (Meyrick, 1934)

== Copromorphidae ==
- Rhynchoferella syncentra (Meyrick, 1916)

== Cosmopterigidae ==
- Cosmopterix attenuatella (Walker, 1864)
- Falcatariella catalaiella Viette, 1949
- Falcatariella hirsutella Viette, 1968
- Gibeauxiella reliqua (Gibeaux, 1986)
- Hyalochna malgassella Viette, 1963
- Isidiella labathiella (Viette, 1956)
- Macrobathra antimeloda Meyrick, 1930
- Macrobathra auratella Viette, 1958
- Macrobathra sikoraella (Viette, 1956)
- Meleonoma diehlella Viette, 1955
- Meleonoma impulsa Meyrick, 1934
- Pyroderces ocreella Viette, 1955
- Scaeosopha betrokensis Sinev & H.H. Li, 2012
- Stagmatophora chopardella Viette, 1954
- Stagmatophora diakonoffi Viette, 1968

== Cossidae ==
- Hirtocossus cirrilator (Le Cerf, 1919)
- Hirtocossus crucis Kenrick, 1914
- Phragmataecia itremo Viette, 1974
- Planctogystia albiplagiata (Gaede, 1930)
- Planctogystia breviculus Mabille, 1880
- Planctogystia crassilineatus (Gaede, 1930)
- Planctogystia parvulus Kenrick, 1914
- Planctogystia fulvosparsus Butler, 1882
- Planctogystia gaedei (Schoorl, 1990)
- Planctogystia legraini Yakovlev & Saldaitis, 2011
- Planctogystia lemur Yakovlev, 2009
- Planctogystia olsoufieffae Yakovlev, 2011
- Planctogystia pavidus Butler, 1882
- Planctogystia parvulus (Kenrick, 1914)
- Planctogystia sakalava Viette, 1958
- Planctogystia senex Butler, 1882
- Pseudocossus boisduvalii Viette, 1955
- Pseudocossus mineti Yakovlev, 2011
- Pseudocossus olsoufieffae Yakovlev, 2011
- Pseudocossus pljustchi Yakovlev & Saldaitis, 2011
- Pseudocossus uliginosus Kenrick, 1914
- Pseudocossus viettei Yakovlev, 2011
- Strigocossus ambahona (Viette, 1954)
- Strigocossus cretacea (Butler, 1878)
- Zeuzeropecten altitudinis (Viette, 1958)
- Zeuzeropecten castaneus (Kenrick, 1914)
- Zeuzeropecten combustus (Kenrick, 1914)
- Zeuzeropecten grandis Viette, 1949
- Zeuzeropecten lactescens Gaede, 1929
- Zeuzeropecten lecerfi (Viette, 1958)
- Zeuzeropecten occultoides (Kenrick, 1914)

== Crambidae ==
- Achyra coelatalis (Walker, 1859)
- Adelpherupa terreus (Zeller, 1877)
- Aethaloessa floridalis (Zeller, 1852)
- Agathodes musivalis Guenée, 1854
- Agathodes isabella Viette, 1989
- Agrotera atalis Viette, 1958
- Agrotera namorokalis Marion & Viette, 1956
- Ambia ambrealis Viette, 1960
- Ambia andasalis Viette, 1960
- Ambia anosibalis Viette, 1958
- Ambia argentifascialis Marion, 1956
- Ambia catalaianus (Viette, 1954)
- Ambia marmorealis Marion & Viette, 1956
- Ambia nosivalis Viette, 1958
- Ambia phobos Viette, 1989
- Ambia pictoralis Viette, 1960
- Ambia vilisalis Viette, 1958
- Analyta calligrammalis Mabille, 1879
- Analyta gammalis Viette, 1958
- Anania elutalis (Kenrick, 1917)
- Anania ochriscriptalis (Marion & Viette, 1956)
- Ancylolomia auripaleella Marion, 1954
- Ancylolomia capensis Zeller, 1852
- Ancylolomia perfasciata Hampson, 1919
- Ancylolomia punctistrigellus (Mabille, 1880)
- Angustalius ditaeniellus Marion, 1954
- Angustalius hapaliscus (Zeller, 1852)
- Angustalius philippiellus Viette, 1970
- Angustalius malacellus (Duponchel, 1836)
- Argyractis coloralis (Guenée, 1854)
- Argyrarcha margarita (Warren, 1892)
- Argyrophorodes anosibalis Marion, 1956
- Argyrophorodes catalalis (Marion & Viette, 1956)
- Argyrophorodes dubiefalis Viette, 1978
- Argyrophorodes grisealis Marion, 1956
- Argyrophorodes hydrocampalis Marion, 1956
- Argyrophorodes luteivittalis (Mabille, 1880)
- Autocharis bekilalis (Marion & Viette, 1956)
- Autocharis carnosalis (Saalmüller, 1880)
- Autocharis catalalis (Viette, 1953)
- Autocharis ecthaemata (Hampson, 1913)
- Autocharis jacobsalis (Marion & Viette, 1956)
- Autocharis librodalis (Viette, 1958)
- Autocharis phortalis (Viette, 1958)
- Autocharis putralis (Viette, 1958)
- Autocharis seyrigalis (Marion & Viette, 1956)
- Bocchoris inspersalis (Zeller, 1852)
- Bocchoris isakalis Viette, 1954
- Bocchoris luteofusalis (Mabille, 1900)
- Bocchoris rufiflavalis Hampson, 1912
- Bocchoris tigridalis (Mabille, 1900)
- Botyodes andrinalis Viette, 1958
- Botyodes asialis Guenée, 1854
- Bradina admixtalis (Walker, 1859)
- Bradina macaralis Walker, 1859
- Cadarena sinuata (Fabricius, 1781)
- Calamotropha discellus (Walker, 1863)
- Calamotropha malgasella Błeszyński, 1970
- Calamotropha dzoma Viette, 1971
- Cataclysta albifulvalis Marion, 1956
- Cataclysta albipunctalis Hampson, 1897
- Cataclysta ambahonalis (Marion, 1954)
- Cataclysta argyrochrysalis Mabille, 1900
- Cataclysta callichromalis Mabille, 1879
- Cataclysta pusillalis Saalmüller, 1880
- Chilo orichalcociliella (Strand, 1911)
- Chilo partellus (Swinhoe, 1885)
- Chilo sacchariphagus (Bojer, 1856)
- Cirrhochrista cygnalis Pagenstecher, 1907
- Cirrhochrista metisalis Viette, 1961
- Cirrhochrista oxylalis Viette, 1961
- Clatrodes squaleralis Marion & Viette, 1953
- Clupeosoma orientalalis (Viette, 1954)
- Clupeosoma vohilavalis (Marion & Viette, 1956)
- Cnaphalocrocis didialis (Viette, 1958)
- Cnaphalocrocis poeyalis (Boisduval, 1833)
- Cnaphalocrocis trapezalis (Guenée, 1854)
- Cnaphalocrocis trebiusalis (Walker, 1859)
- Condylorrhiza zyphalis (Viette, 1958)
- Coptobasoides leucothyralis (Mabille, 1900)
- Coptobasoides rubrifucalis (Mabille, 1900)
- Cotachena octoguttalis (Felder & Rogenhofer, 1875)
- Cotachena smaragdina (Butler, 1875)
- Crocidolomia pavonana (Fabricius, 1794)
- Crocidophora elongalis Viette, 1978
- Culladia achroellum (Mabille, 1900)
- Diaphana andringitralis Viette, 1960
- Diaphana indica (Saunders, 1851)
- Diaphana jacobsalis Marion & Viette, 1956
- Diaphana paulianalis Marion & Viette, 1956
- Diasemia monostigma Hampson, 1913
- Diastictis gallienalis Viette, 1958
- Dicepolia marginescriptalis (Kenrick, 1917)
- Dicepolia marionalis (Viette, 1958)
- Dicepolia munroealis (Viette, 1960)
- Dicepolia rufeolalis (Mabille, 1900)
- Dichocrocis alluaudalis Viette, 1953
- Dichocrocis catalalis Viette, 1953
- Dolicharthria modestalis (Saalmüller, 1880)
- Dolicharthria mabillealis (Viette, 1953)
- Duponchelia fovealis Zeller, 1847
- Elophila minimalis (Saalmüller, 1880)
- Elophila minoralis (Mabille, 1881)
- Euclasta whalleyi Popescu-Gorj & Constantinescu, 1973
- Euchromius klimeschi Błeszyński, 1961
- Euchromius mythus Błeszyński, 1970
- Euchromius ocellea (Haworth, 1811)
- Euphyciodes albotessulalis (Mabille, 1900)
- Eurrhyparodes tricoloralis (Zeller, 1852)
- Evergestis terminalis (Mabille, 1880)
- Filodes costivitralis Guenée, 1862
- Filodes malgassica Mabille,
- Ghesquierellana hirtusalis (Walker, 1859)
- Glyphodella vadonalis (Viette, 1958)
- Glyphodes boseae Saalmüller, 1880
- Glyphodes malgassalis Mabille, 1900
- Glyphodes paramicalis Kenrick, 1917
- Glyphodes shafferorum Viette, 1987
- Goniophysetis actalellus (Viette, 1960)
- Goniophysetis malgassellus (Viette, 1960)
- Goniorhynchus argyropalis (Hampson, 1908)
- Haimbachia leucopleuralis (Mabille, 1900)
- Haritalodes barbuti Leraut, 2005
- Haritalodes derogata (Fabricius, 1775)
- Haritalodes mineti Leraut, 2005
- Haritalodes polycymalis (Hampson, 1912)
- Heliothela ophideresana (Walker, 1863)
- Hellula undalis (Fabricius, 1781)
- Herpetogramma licarsisalis (Walker, 1859)
- Herpetogramma phaeopteralis (Guenée, 1854)
- Hodebertia testalis (Fabricius, 1794)
- Hyalobathra dictatrix Meyrick, 1934
- Hydriris ornatalis (Duponchel, 1832)
- Hymenoptychis sordida Zeller, 1852
- Ischnurges lancinalis (Guenée, 1854)
- Isocentris filalis (Guenée, 1854)
- Isocentris retinalis (Saalmüller, 1880)
- Lamprosema alphalis (Viette, 1958)
- Lamprosema griseolineata (Mabille, 1900)
- Lamprosema guttalis (Viette, 1958)
- Lamprosema lucillalis (Viette, 1958)
- Lamprosema rakotalis (Viette, 1958)
- Leucinodes hemichionalis (Mabille, 1900)
- Leucinodes leucophanalis Mabille, 1900
- Leucinodes vinanyalis (Viette, 1958)
- Loxostege decaryalis Marion & Viette, 1956
- Lygropia acosmialis (Mabille, 1879)
- Lygropia ochracealis (Saalmüller, 1880)
- Lygropia viettalis (Marion, 1956)
- Mabilleodes catalalis Marion & Viette, 1956
- Marasmia didialis Viette, 1958
- Maruca vitrata (Fabricius, 1787)
- Megatarsodes baltealis (Mabille, 1881)
- Nausinoe geometralis (Guenée, 1854)
- Nevrina flabelligera (Saalmüller, 1880)
- Nomophila noctuella ([Denis & Schiffermüller], 1775)
- Noorda blitealis Walker, 1859
- Noorda diehlalis Marion & Viette, 1956
- Notarcha quaternalis (Zeller, 1852)
- Omiodes dnopheralis (Mabille, 1900)
- Omiodes indicata (Fabricius, 1775)
- Omphisa vaovao Viette, 1973
- Pagyda pulvereiumbralis (Hampson, 1918)
- Palpita vitrealis (Rossi, 1794)
- Pardomima testudinalis Saalmüller, 1880
- Parapoynx diminutalis (Snellen, 1880)
- Parapoynx luteivittalis (Mabille, 1880)
- Parapoynx minoralis Mabille, 1881
- Parapoynx plumbefusalis (Hampson, 1917)
- Parapoynx stagnalis (Zeller, 1852)
- Parotis ankaratralis (Marion, 1954)
- Parotis costulalis (Strand, 1912)
- Parotis prasinalis (Saalmüller, 1880)
- Parotis zambesialis (Walker, 1866)
- Parthenodes ankasokalis Viette, 1958
- Phostria antongilensis (Mabille, 1900)
- Pilocrocis deltalis Viette, 1958
- Pilocrocis fanovalis Viette, 1958
- Pilocrocis italavalis Viette, 1958
- Pilocrocis janinalis Viette, 1958
- Pilocrocis xanthostictalis Hampson, 1908
- Placosaris labordalis Viette, 1958
- Pleuroptya balteata (Fabricius, 1798)
- Polygrammodes faraonyalis Viette, 1954
- Polygrammodes jeannelalis Marion & Viette, 1956
- Polygrammodes phyllophila (Butler, 1878)
- Polygrammodes seyrigalis Viette, 1953
- Polythlipta annulifera (Walker, 1865)
- Psara atropunctalis (Mabille, 1900)
- Psara brunnealis (Hampson, 1913)
- Psara dorcalis (Guenée, 1862)
- Psara ferruginalis (Saalmüller, 1880)
- Psara minoralis (Warren, 1892)
- Pycnarmon eosalis Viette, 1958
- Pycnarmon macilentalis Viette, 1958
- Pycnarmon septemnotata (Mabille, 1900)
- Pyrausta amelokalis (Viette, 1958)
- Pyrausta ankaratralis Marion & Viette, 1956
- Pyrausta childrenalis (Boisduval, 1833)
- Pyrausta flavipunctalis (Marion, 1954)
- Pyrausta griveaudalis Viette, 1978
- Pyrausta kandalis Viette, 1989
- Pyrausta lambomakandroalis Viette, 1954
- Pyrausta monotretalis (Mabille, 1879)
- Pyrausta posticalis (Saalmüller, 1880)
- Pyrausta rubrivena (Warren, 1892)
- Pyrausta semilimbalis Mabille, 1900
- Pyrausta subflavalis (Warren, 1892)
- Pyrausta syntomidalis Viette, 1960
- Pyrausta venilialis (Mabille, 1880)
- Pyrausta zyphalis Viette, 1958
- Sameodes cancellalis (Zeller, 1852)
- Sameodesma decaryalis (Viette, 1954)
- Scirpophaga goliath Marion & Viette, 1953
- Scoparia benigna Meyrick, 1910
- Spoladea recurvalis (Fabricius, 1775)
- Stemorrhages sericea (Drury, 1773)
- Syllepte aureotinctalis (Kenrick, 1917)
- Syllepte glebalis (Lederer, 1863)
- Syllepte hemichionalis (Mabille, 1900)
- Syllepte kenrickalis Viette, 1960
- Syllepte lanatalis Viette, 1960
- Syllepte mahafalalis Marion & Viette, 1956
- Syllepte malgassanalis (Viette, 1954)
- Syllepte pauperalis Marion, 1954
- Syllepte posticalis (Saalmüller, 1880)
- Syllepte rubrifucalis (Mabille, 1900)
- Syllepte sakarahalis (Marion & Viette, 1956)
- Syllepte stumpffalis Viette, 1960
- Syllepte vohilavalis (Viette, 1954)
- Syllepte neodesmialis Klima, 1939
- Syllepte ovialis (Walker, 1859)
- Symphonia marionalis Viette, 1958
- Symphonia nymphulalis Marion & Viette, 1956
- Syngamia jeanneli (Viette, 1954)
- Tegostoma kenrickalis Marion & Viette, 1956
- Theila fusconebulalis (Marion, 1954)
- Thliptoceras longicornalis (Mabille, 1900)
- Thyridiphora furia (Swinhoe, 1884)
- Udea ferrugalis (Hübner, 1796)
- Ulopeza crocifrontalis Mabille, 1900
- Ulopeza macilentalis Viette, 1958
- Uresiphita catalalis (Viette, 1953)
- Viettessa bethalis (Viette, 1958)
- Zacatecas ankasokellus (Viette, 1960)
- Zagiridia alamotralis Viette, 1973
- Zebronia phenice (Cramer, 1780)

== Depressariidae ==
- Odites agathopella Viette, 1968
- Odites anasticta Meyrick, 1930
- Odites anisocarpa Meyrick, 1930
- Odites atomosperma Meyrick, 1933
- Odites cataxantha Meyrick, 1915
- Odites consecrata Meyrick, 1917
- Odites fotsyella Viette, 1973
- Odites haplonoma Meyrick, 1915
- Odites hemigymna Meyrick, 1930
- Odites inversa Meyrick, 1914
- Odites johanna Viette, 1987
- Odites lioxesta Meyrick, 1933
- Odites malagasiella Viette, 1968
- Odites metaclista Meyrick, 1915
- Odites minetella Viette, 1985
- Odites ochrodryas Meyrick, 1933
- Odites perfusella Viette, 1958
- Odites thesmia Meyrick, 1917
- Odites tinactella Viette, 1958
- Odites tsaraella Viette, 1986
- Odites typota Meyrick, 1915

=== Depressariinae ===
- Agonopterix liesella Viette, 1987
- Eutorna diluvialis Meyrick, 1913
- Eutorna punctinigrella Viette, 1955
- Orophia madagascariensis (Viette, 1951)
- Orophia toulgoetianum (Viette, 1954)

=== Ethmiinae ===
- Ethmia ampanella Viette, 1976
- Ethmia ampanella Viette, 1976
- Ethmia andranella Viette, 1976
- Ethmia atriflorella Viette, 1958
- Ethmia albilineata Viette, 1952
- Ethmia befasiella Viette, 1958
- Ethmia glandifera Meyrick, 1918
- Ethmia befasiella Viette, 1958
- Ethmia linosella Viette, 1976
- Ethmia bradleyi Viette, 1952
- Ethmia decaryanum (Viette, 1954)
- Ethmia deconfiturella Viette, 1963
- Ethmia nigroapicella (Saalmüller, 1880)
- Ethmia novoryella Viette, 1976
- Ethmia oberthurella Viette, 1958
- Ethmia oculigera (Möschler, 1883)
- Ethmia oculimarginata Diakonoff, 1947
- Ethmia pylonotella Viette, 1956
- Ethmia pylorella Viette, 1956
- Ethmia saalmullerella Viette, 1958
- Ethmia sotsaella Viette, 1976

== Drepanidae ==
- Archidrepana saturniata Warren, 1902
- Crocinis boboa Watson, 1965
- Crocinis canescens Watson, 1965
- Crocinis felina Watson, 1965
- Crocinis fenestrata Butler, 1879
- Crocinis imaitsoana Watson, 1965
- Crocinis licina Watson, 1965
- Crocinis prolixa Watson, 1965
- Crocinis spicata Watson, 1965
- Crocinis tetrathyra (Mabille, 1900)
- Crocinis viettei Watson, 1965
- Epicampoptera carnea (Saalmüller, 1884)
- Epicampoptera graciosa Watson, 1965
- Epicampoptera griveaudi Watson, 1965
- Gonoreta bispina Watson, 1965
- Gonoretodes timea Watson, 1965
- Nidara calligola Watson, 1965
- Nidara croceina Mabille, 1898
- Nidara marcus Watson, 1965
- Nidara multiversa Watson, 1965
- Nidara pumilla Watson, 1965
- Oretopsis vohilava (Viette, 1954)

== Dudgeoneidae ==
- Dudgeonea locuples (Mabille, 1879)
- Dudgeonea malagassa Viette, 1958

== Elachistidae ==
- Elachista crocogastra Meyrick, 1908

== Epipyropidae ==
- Epipyrops grandidieri Viette, 1961
- Epipyrops malagassica Jordan, 1928
- Epipyrops radama Viette, 1961

== Eupterotidae ==
- Jana palliatella Viette, 1955

== Gelechiidae ==
- Anarsia agricola Walsingham, 1891
- Anarsia gambiensis Strand, 1913
- Anarsia malagasyella Viette, 1968
- Bilobata subsecivella (Zeller, 1852)
- Brachmia liberta Meyrick, 1926
- Chrysoesthia stipelloides (Janse, 1950)
- Dichomeris acuminatus (Staudinger, 1876)
- Dichomeris andasibea Bippus, 2020
- Dichomeris antizella Viette, 1986
- Dichomeris asaphocosma (Meyrick, 1934)
- Dichomeris ebenosella (Viette, 1968)
- Dichomeris eosella (Viette, 1957)
- Dichomeris millotella Viette, 1956
- Dichomeris monorbella Viette, 1988
- Dichomeris ochreofimbriella (Viette, 1968)
- Dichomeris paulianella Viette, 1956
- Dichomeris pauliani De Prins & Koo, 2020
- Dichomeris tananaella (Viette, 1985)
- Dichomeris tepens (Meyrick, 1923)
- Dichomeris tongoborella (Viette, 1958)
- Dichomeris vadonella Viette, 1955
- Dichomeris xeresella (Viette, 1956)
- Dichomeris zymotella Viette, 1956
- Helcystogramma convolvuli (Walsingham, 1907)
- Helcystogramma malagasy Bippus, 2020
- Helcystogramma metallica (Walsingham, 1891)
- Hypatima antsianakella Viette, 1956
- Hypatima manjakatompo Viette, 1956
- Hypatima perinetella Viette, 1956
- Idiophantis croconota Meyrick, 1918
- Mesophleps palpigera (Walsingham, 1891)
- Mesophleps safranella (Legrand, 1966)
- Pectinophora gossypiella (Saunders, 1844)
- Phthorimaea operculella (Zeller, 1873)
- Polyhymno millotiella Viette, 1954
- Pycnodytis irrigata Meyrick, 1918
- Sitotroga cerealella (Olivier, 1789)
- Scrobipalpa aptatella (Walker, 1864)
- Stegasta sattleri Bidzilya & Mey, 2011
- Stomopteryx descarpentriesella (Viette, 1956)
- Stomopteryx grandidierella (Viette, 1956)
- Symbatica heimella Viette, 1954
- Syncopacma sikoraella Viette, 1956

== Geometridae ==
- Acanthovalva itremo Krüger, 2001
- Acidaliastis porphyretica Prout, 1925
- Afrophyla vethi (Snellen, 1886)
- Agathia malgassa Herbulot, 1979
- Anticleora ordinata Herbulot, 1966
- Anticleora proemia (Prout, 1917)
- Anticleora toulgoeti Viette, 1979
- Antitrygodes dentilinea Warren, 1897
- Antitrygodes herbuloti Viette, 1977
- Antitrygodes malagasy Viette, 1977
- Aphilopota alloeomorpha Prout, 1938
- Aphilopota aspera Prout, 1938
- Aphilopota fletcheriana Viette, 1975
- Aphilopota immatura Prout, 1938
- Aphilopota reducta Viette, 1973
- Aphilopota semidentata Prout, 1931
- Aphilopota seyrigi Viette, 1973
- Aposteira saurides Prout, 1935
- Archichlora alophias Herbulot, 1954
- Archichlora altivagans Herbulot, 1960
- Archichlora ambrimontis Herbulot, 1960
- Archichlora andranobe Viette, 1978
- Archichlora ankalirano Viette, 1975
- Archichlora antanosa Herbulot, 1960
- Archichlora bevilany Viette, 1978
- Archichlora chariessa Prout, 1925
- Archichlora engenes Prout, 1922
- Archichlora florilimbata Herbulot, 1960
- Archichlora griveaudi Viette, 1978
- Archichlora hemistrigata (Mabille, 1900)
- Archichlora herbuloti Viette, 1978
- Archichlora majuscula Herbulot, 1960
- Archichlora monodi Viette, 1975
- Archichlora nigricosta Herbulot, 1960
- Archichlora pavonina Herbulot, 1960
- Archichlora petroselina Herbulot, 1960
- Archichlora povolnyi Viette, 1975
- Archichlora soa Viette, 1971
- Archichlora sola Herbulot, 1960
- Archichlora stellicincta Herbulot, 1972
- Archichlora subrubescens Herbulot, 1960
- Archichlora triangularia (Swinhoe, 1904)
- Archichlora tricycla Herbulot, 1960
- Archichlora trygodes Prout, 1922
- Archichlora vieui Herbulot, 1960
- Archichlora viridicrossa Herbulot, 1960
- Argyrophora trofonia (Cramer, 1779)
- Ascotis reciprocaria (Walker, 1860)
- Asthenotricha comosissima Herbulot, 1970
- Asthenotricha deficiens Herbulot, 1954
- Asthenotricha furtiva Herbulot, 1960
- Asthenotricha lophopterata (Guenée, 1857)
- Asthenotricha nesiotes Herbulot, 1954
- Asthenotricha parabolica Herbulot, 1954
- Asthenotricha quadrata Herbulot, 1960
- Asthenotricha semidivisa Warren, 1901
- Asthenotricha torata Prout, 1932
- Blechroneromia ambinanitelo Viette, 1978
- Blechroneromia anthosyne Prout, 1925
- Blechroneromia eluta Prout, 1925
- Blechroneromia griveaudi Viette, 1976
- Blechroneromia gutierrezi Viette, 1971
- Blechroneromia herbuloti Viette, 1976
- Blechroneromia malagasy Viette, 1976
- Blechroneromia meridionalis Viette, 1976
- Blechroneromia mianta Prout, 1925
- Blechroneromia pauliani Viette, 1976
- Blechroneromia perileuca Prout, 1925
- Blechroneromia peyrierasi Viette, 1976
- Blechroneromia pudica Herbulot, 1972
- Blechroneromia sogai Viette, 1976
- Blechroneromia toulgoeti Viette, 1976
- Brachytrita cervinaria Swinhoe, 1904
- Cabera toulgoeti Herbulot, 1957
- Cancellalata fletcheri Viette, 1979
- Chiasmia avitusarioides (Herbulot, 1957)
- Chiasmia coronoleucas (Prout, 1915)
- Chiasmia crassilembaria (Mabille, 1880)
- Chiasmia herbuloti (Viette, 1973)
- Chiasmia hypactinia (Prout 1916)
- Chiasmia insulicola Krüger, 2001
- Chiasmia livorosa (Herbulot, 1964)
- Chiasmia malgassofusca Krüger, 2001
- Chiasmia megalesia (Viette, 1975)
- Chiasmia neolivorosa Krüger, 2001
- Chiasmia normata (Walker, 1861)
- Chiasmia orthostates (Prout, 1915)
- Chiasmia rectilinea (Warren, 1905)
- Chiasmia separata (Druce 1883)
- Chiasmia simplicilinea (Warren 1905)
- Chiasmia streniata (Guenée, 1858)
- Chiasmia tetragraphicata (Saalmuller 1880)
- Chiasmia trirecurva (Saalmuller 1891)
- Chiasmia tsaratanana (Viette 1980)
- Chiasmia umbrata (Warren, 1897)
- Chlorissa stibolepida (Butler, 1879)
- Chloroclystis derasata (Bastelberger, 1905)
- Chloroclystis latifasciata de Joannis, 1932
- Chloroclystis nanula (Mabille, 1900)
- Chlorodrepana madecassa Viette, 1971
- Chrysocraspeda aurantibasis Herbulot, 1970
- Chrysocraspeda angulosa Herbulot, 1970
- Chrysocraspeda anthocroca (Prout, 1925)
- Chrysocraspeda apicirubra (Prout, 1917)
- Chrysocraspeda aurantibasis (Herbulot, 1970)
- Chrysocraspeda bradyspila (Prout, 1934)
- Chrysocraspeda callichroa (Prout, 1934)
- Chrysocraspeda corallina Herbulot, 1970
- Chrysocraspeda doricaria Swinhoe, 1904
- Chrysocraspeda eclipsis (Prout, 1932)
- Chrysocraspeda erythraria (Mabille, 1893)
- Chrysocraspeda gnamptoloma (Prout, 1925)
- Chrysocraspeda kenricki (Prout, 1925)
- Chrysocraspeda nasuta (Prout, 1934)
- Chrysocraspeda neurina (Prout, 1934)
- Chrysocraspeda orthogramma (Prout, 1925)
- Chrysocraspeda peristoecha (Prout, 1925)
- Chrysocraspeda phanoptica (Prout, 1934)
- Chrysocraspeda planaria Swinhoe, 1904
- Chrysocraspeda polyniphes (Prout, 1925)
- Chrysocraspeda rubida (Swinhoe, 1904)
- Chrysocraspeda volutisignata (Prout, 1925)
- Chrysocraspeda zaphleges (Prout, 1925)
- Chrysocraspeda zearia Swinhoe, 1904
- Cleora acaciaria (Boisduval, 1833)
- Cleora atriclava Prout, 1926
- Cleora legrasi (Herbulot, 1955)
- Cleora macracantha (Herbulot, 1955)
- Cleora proemia Prout, 1917
- Cleora quadrimaculata (Janse, 1932)
- Cleora rothkirchi (Strand, 1914)
- Cleora tora Prout, 1926
- Collix foraminata Guenée, 1858
- Colocleora calcarata Herbulot, 1972
- Colocleora chrysomelas Viette, 1975
- Colocleora clio Viette, 1973
- Colocleora delos Viette, 1973
- Colocleora disgrega Prout, 1938
- Colocleora erato Viette, 1973
- Colocleora euplates (Prout, 1925)
- Colocleora euterpe Viette, 1973
- Colocleora herbuloti Viette, 1973
- Colocleora nampouinei Viette, 1973
- Colocleora oncera Prout, 1938
- Colocleora opisthommata Prout, 1938
- Colocleora umbrata Prout, 1938
- Comibaena leucochloraria (Mabille, 1880)
- Comibaena punctaria (Swinhoe, 1904)
- Comostolopsis rufocellata (Mabille, 1900)
- Comostolopsis rufostellata (Mabille, 1900)
- Comostolopsis stillata (Felder & Rogenhofer, 1875)
- Comostolopsis subsimplex Prout, 1913
- Cyclophora lyciscaria (Guenée, 1857)
- Cyclophora metamorpha (Prout, 1925)
- Cyclophora orboculata (Prout, 1922)
- Darisodes orygaria (Guenée, 1862)
- Derambila puella (Butler, 1880)
- Diptychia rhodotenia Mabille, 1898
- Disclisioprocta natalata (Walker, 1862)
- Doloma leucocephala Prout, 1922
- Drepanogynis acerba Herbulot, 1954
- Drepanogynis alternans Herbulot, 1960
- Drepanogynis amethystina Herbulot, 1960
- Drepanogynis atrovirens Herbulot, 1960
- Drepanogynis cervina (Warren, 1894)
- Drepanogynis clavata Herbulot, 1960
- Drepanogynis discolor Herbulot, 1956
- Drepanogynis ellipsis Herbulot, 1954
- Drepanogynis herbuloti Viette, 1970
- Drepanogynis hiaraka Viette, 1968
- Drepanogynis hypopyrrha (Prout, 1932)
- Drepanogynis itremo Viette, 1974
- Drepanogynis nicotiana Viette, 1977
- Drepanogynis olivina Herbulot, 1956
- Drepanogynis peyrierasi Viette, 1974
- Drepanogynis prosecta Herbulot, 1960
- Drepanogynis protactosema Prout, 1932
- Drepanogynis purpurascens Herbulot, 1954
- Drepanogynis quadrivalvis Herbulot, 1960
- Drepanogynis rakotobe Viette, 1972
- Drepanogynis ralambo Viette, 1972
- Drepanogynis ratovosoni Viette, 1972
- Drepanogynis rubriceps Herbulot, 1960
- Drepanogynis salamandra Herbulot, 1960
- Drepanogynis sandrangatensis Herbulot, 1956
- Drepanogynis sogai Herbulot, 1960
- Drepanogynis thieli Herbulot, 1979
- Drepanogynis tigrinata Viette, 1972
- Drepanogynis tornimacula Herbulot, 1956
- Drepanogynis tsaratanana Viette, 1980
- Drepanogynis umbrosa Herbulot, 1960
- Dryochlora cinctuta (Saalmüller, 1891)
- Dyschlorodes bicolor Viette, 1971
- Dyschlorodes hepatias Herbulot, 1966
- Ectropis albobrunnea Herbulot, 1981
- Ectropis annumerata Prout, 1925
- Ectropis basalis Herbulot, 1981
- Ectropis bicolor Herbulot, 1972
- Ectropis bistortatoides Herbulot, 1954
- Ectropis celsicola Herbulot, 1972
- Ectropis chopardi Herbulot, 1954
- Ectropis contradicta Herbulot, 1972
- Ectropis cornuta Herbulot, 1968
- Ectropis despicata Herbulot, 1981
- Ectropis dribraria (Swinhoe, 1904)
- Ectropis emphona (Prout, 1925)
- Ectropis fossa Herbulot, 1981
- Ectropis hero Viette, 1971
- Ectropis loxosira Prout, 1932
- Ectropis maromokotra Viette, 1980
- Ectropis milloti Herbulot, 1954
- Ectropis moderata Herbulot, 1972
- Ectropis pauliani Herbulot, 1954
- Ectropis pluto Viette, 1971
- Ectropis prospila (Prout, 1916)
- Ectropis sogai Herbulot, 1981
- Ectropis sublutea (Butler, 1880)
- Ectropis superuncina Herbulot, 1972
- Ectropis ulterior Herbulot, 1954
- Ectropis vadoni Herbulot, 1954
- Eois anisorrhopa Prout, 1933
- Eois incandescens Herbulot, 1954
- Eois suarezensis Prout, 1923
- Epigelasma alba Viette, 1970
- Epigelasma befasy Viette, 1981
- Epigelasma corrupta Herbulot, 1954
- Epigelasma crenifera Herbulot, 1970
- Epigelasma lutea Viette, 1970
- Epigelasma meloui Prout, 1930
- Epigelasma nobilis Herbulot, 1954
- Epigelasma olsoufieffi Herbulot, 1972
- Epigelasma perineti Herbulot, 1972
- Epigelasma rhodostigma Herbulot, 1954
- Epigynopteryx artemis Viette, 1973
- Epigynopteryx aurantiaca Herbulot, 1965
- Epigynopteryx borgeaudi (Herbulot, 1956)
- Epigynopteryx castanea Viette, 1977
- Epigynopteryx colligata (Saalmüller, 1891)
- Epigynopteryx declinans Herbulot, 1965
- Epigynopteryx dia Viette, 1973
- Epigynopteryx glycera Prout, 1934
- Epigynopteryx indiscretaria (Mabille, 1898)
- Epigynopteryx modesta (Butler, 1880)
- Epigynopteryx piperata (Saalmüller, 1880)
- Epigynopteryx prolixa (Prout, 1915)
- Epigynopteryx pygmaea Herbulot, 1956
- Epigynopteryx silvestris Herbulot, 1954
- Epigynopteryx sogai Viette, 1973
- Epigynopteryx tenera Viette, 1973
- Epigynopteryx variabile Viette, 1973
- Epigynopteryx xeres Viette, 1973
- Erastria fletcheri (Viette, 1970)
- Erastria leucicolor (Butler, 1875)
- Erastria madecassaria (Boisduval, 1833)
- Eucrostes disparata Walker, 1861
- Eupithecia dilucida (Warren, 1899)
- Eupithecia dissobapta Prout, 1932
- Eupithecia ericeti Herbulot, 1970
- Eupithecia hemileucaria Mabille, 1880
- Eupithecia personata D. S. Fletcher, 1951
- Eupithecia rigida Swinhoe, 1892
- Eupithecia semipallida Janse, 1933
- Eupithecia sogai Herbulot, 1970
- Eupithecia streptozona Prout, 1932
- Exeliopsis brunnea Viette, 1977
- Haplolabida lacrimans Herbulot, 1970
- Haplolabida pauliani Viette, 1975
- Haplolabida viettei Herbulot, 1970
- Hemistola hypnopoea Prout, 1926
- Herbulotides amphion Viette, 1971
- Herbulotides griveaudi Viette, 1975
- Herbulotides ino Viette, 1971
- Herbulotides lymantrina (Herbulot, 1970)
- Herbulotides sao Viette, 1971
- Heterorachis asyllaria (Swinhoe, 1904)
- Heterorachis diaphana (Warren, 1899)
- Heterorachis diphrontis Prout, 1922
- Heterorachis insueta Prout, 1922
- Heterorachis malachitica (Saalmüller, 1880)
- Heterorachis tornata Prout, 1922
- Heterorachis trita Prout, 1922
- Heterorachis ultramarina Herbulot, 1968
- Heterostegane circumrubrata Prout, 1915
- Heterostegane incognita Prout, 1915
- Heterostegane luteorubens (Mabille, 1900)
- Heterostegane ruberata (Mabille, 1900)
- Horisme cuprea Herbulot, 1972
- Hylemera aetionaria (Swinhoe, 1904)
- Hylemera altitudina Viette, 1970
- Hylemera altivolans Viette, 1970
- Hylemera andriai Viette, 1970
- Hylemera azalea (Prout, 1925)
- Hylemera butleri Viette, 1970
- Hylemera cadoreli Viette, 1970
- Hylemera candida Butler, 1882
- Hylemera cunea Viette, 1970
- Hylemera decaryi Viette, 1970
- Hylemera ecstasa Viette, 1970
- Hylemera elegans Viette, 1970
- Hylemera euphrantica (Prout, 1932)
- Hylemera fletcheri Viette, 1970
- Hylemera fragilis Butler, 1879
- Hylemera griveaudi Viette, 1970
- Hylemera herbuloti Viette, 1970
- Hylemera hiemalis Viette, 1970
- Hylemera hypostigmica (Prout, 1925)
- Hylemera instabilis Viette, 1970
- Hylemera laurentensis Viette, 1970
- Hylemera lemuria Viette, 1970
- Hylemera lichenea Viette, 1970
- Hylemera mabillei Viette, 1970
- Hylemera malagasy Viette, 1970
- Hylemera marmorata Viette, 1970
- Hylemera nivea Butler, 1882
- Hylemera pauliani Viette, 1970
- Hylemera perrieri Viette, 1970
- Hylemera plana (Butler, 1879)
- Hylemera prouti Viette, 1970
- Hylemera puella Butler, 1879
- Hylemera rebuti (Poujade, 1889)
- Hylemera roseidaria Viette, 1970
- Hylemera sogai Viette, 1970
- Hylemera sparsipuncta Viette, 1970
- Hylemera subaridea Viette, 1970
- Hylemera teleutaea (Prout, 1925)
- Hylemera tenuis Butler, 1878
- Hylemera vinacea Viette, 1970
- Hypochrosis suffusata Pagenstecher, 1907
- Hypocoela humidaria (Swinhoe, 1904)
- Hypocoela infracta Herbulot, 1956
- Hypocoela tornifusca Herbulot, 1970
- Idaea lilliputaria (Warren, 1902)
- Idaea lycaugidia (Prout, 1932)
- Idaea poecilocrossa (Prout, 1932)
- Idaea pulveraria (Snellen, 1872)
- Idaea sympractor (Prout, 1932)
- Idaea tristega (Prout, 1932)
- Idiodes albilinea (Thierry-Mieg, 1907)
- Idiodes albistriga (Warren, 1899)
- Idiodes herbuloti (Viette, 1981)
- Isoplenodia arrogans Prout, 1932
- Isturgia arenularia (Mabille, 1880)
- Isturgia averyi Viette, 1980
- Isturgia banian (Viette, 1981)
- Isturgia contexta (Saalmüller, 1891)
- Isturgia deerraria (Walker, 1861)
- Isturgia devecta (Herbulot, 1966)
- Isturgia griveaudi Krüger, 2001
- Isturgia malesignaria (Mabille, 1880)
- Isturgia modestaria (Pagenstecher, 1907)
- Isturgia sakalava (Herbulot, 1954)
- Isturgia univirgaria (Mabille, 1880)
- Leptocolpia montana Viette, 1977
- Lophostola cara Prout, 1913
- Malgassapeira baton (Viette, 1973)
- Malgassapeira concors (Viette, 1977)
- Malgassapeira lucina (Viette, 1973)
- Malgassapeira punctifera (Warren, 1894)
- Malgassothisa trifida Herbulot, 1966
- Maxates cowani (Butler, 1880)
- Maxates fuscipuncta (Warren, 1898)
- Melinoessa guenoti Herbulot, 1981
- Mesocolpia nanula (Mabille, 1900)
- Mesothisa dubiefi Viette, 1977
- Mesothisa ozola Prout, 1926
- Mesothisa tanala Herbulot, 1968
- Metallaxis herbuloti – Viette, 1978
- Metallaxis sogai – Viette, 1979
- Metallaxis teledapa Prout, 1932
- Metallochlora glacialis (Butler, 1880)
- Metallochlora impotens Prout, 1926
- Microloxia ruficornis Warren, 1897
- Milocera horaria Swinhoe, 1904
- Mimandria insularis Swinhoe, 1904
- Mimoclystia acme (L. B. Prout, 1922)
- Mimoclystia andringitra Herbulot, 1963
- Mimoclystia griveaudi Herbulot, 1970
- Mimoclystia lichenarum Herbulot, 1963
- Mimoclystia rhodopnoa (Prout, 1928)
- Mimoclystia thorenaria (Swinhoe, 1904)
- Mixocera parvulata (Walker, 1863)
- Mixocera wiedenorum Hausmann, 1997
- Negloides oceanitis Prout, 1931
- Neromia picticosta Prout, 1913
- Omphax bara Herbulot, 1972
- Omphax interfulgens Herbulot, 1954
- Omphax neglecta Herbulot, 1977
- Omphax plantaria Guenée, 1858
- Orbamia pauperata Herbulot, 1966
- Orthonama quadrisecta Herbulot, 1954
- Parortholitha cubitata Herbulot, 1981
- Parortholitha ingens Herbulot, 1970
- Perithalera oblongula Prout, 1922
- Petrodava fletcheri Viette, 1970
- Phaiogramma stibolepida (Butler, 1879)
- Pingasa grandidieri (Butler, 1879)
- Pingasa herbuloti Viette, 1971
- Pingasa rhadamaria (Guenée, 1858)
- Pingasa ruginaria (Guenée, 1858)
- Prasinocyma candida Prout, 1923
- Prasinocyma applicata Herbulot, 2000
- Prasinocyma hiaraka Viette, 1981
- Prasinocyma pallidulata (Mabille, 1880)
- Prasinocyma perineti Viette, 1981
- Prasinocyma simiaria (Guenée, 1858)
- Prasinocyma viridipes Herbulot, 2000
- Protosteira spectabilis (Warren, 1899)
- Pseudolarentia dulcis (Butler, 1879)
- Psilocerea anearia Swinhoe, 1904
- Psilocerea barychorda Prout, 1932
- Psilocerea carbo Herbulot, 1970
- Psilocerea catenosa Herbulot, 1970
- Psilocerea dysonaria Swinhoe, 1904
- Psilocerea harmonia Prout, 1932
- Psilocerea insularia (Mabille, 1880)
- Psilocerea nigromaculata Warren, 1897
- Psilocerea olsoufieffae Prout, 1932
- Psilocerea rachicera (Butler, 1880)
- Psilocerea severa Prout, 1932
- Psilocerea tigrinata Saalmüller, 1880
- Psilocerea vestitaria Swinhoe, 1904
- Psilocerea wintreberti Herbulot, 1970
- Racotis apodosima Prout, 1931
- Racotis deportata Herbulot, 1970
- Racotis zebrina Warren, 1899
- Rhodesia alboviridata (Saalmüller, 1880)
- Rhodometra sacraria (Linnaeus, 1767)
- Rhodophthitus formosus Butler, 1880
- Scardamia maculata Warren, 1897
- Scopula abolita Herbulot, 1955
- Scopula addictaria (Walker, 1861)
- Scopula antankarana Herbulot, 1955
- Scopula aspiciens Prout, 1926
- Scopula benenotata Prout, 1932
- Scopula bistrigata (Pagenstecher, 1907)
- Scopula caesaria (Walker, 1861)
- Scopula calothysanis Herbulot, 1965
- Scopula clandestina Herbulot, 1955
- Scopula cornishi Prout, 1932
- Scopula declinata Herbulot, 1972
- Scopula dimoeroides Herbulot, 1955
- Scopula donovani (Distant, 1892)
- Scopula fimbrilineata (Warren, 1902)
- Scopula gibbivalvata Herbulot, 1972
- Scopula glaucescens Herbulot, 1978
- Scopula haeretica Herbulot, 1955
- Scopula holobapharia (Mabille, 1900)
- Scopula infantilis Herbulot, 1970
- Scopula internataria (Walker, 1861)
- Scopula lactaria (Walker, 1861)
- Scopula leucoloma Prout, 1932
- Scopula merina Herbulot, 1956
- Scopula minorata (Boisduval, 1833)
- Scopula minuta (Warren, 1900)
- Scopula moinieri Herbulot, 1966
- Scopula mollicula Prout, 1932
- Scopula normalis Herbulot, 1955
- Scopula omnisona (Prout, 1915)
- Scopula opicata (Fabricius, 1798)
- Scopula prisca Herbulot, 1955
- Scopula protecta Herbulot, 1955
- Scopula pulchellata (Fabricius, 1794)
- Scopula rhodocraspeda Prout, 1932
- Scopula roezaria (Swinhoe, 1904)
- Scopula rubrosignaria (Mabille, 1900)
- Scopula rufinubes (Warren, 1900)
- Scopula rufolutaria (Mabille, 1900)
- Scopula sanguinifissa Herbulot, 1955
- Scopula sanguinisecta (Warren, 1897)
- Scopula seclusa Herbulot, 1972
- Scopula serena Prout, 1920
- Scopula sparsipunctata (Mabille, 1900)
- Scopula subtaeniata (Bastelberger, 1908)
- Scopula tanalorum Herbulot, 1972
- Scopula terrearia (Mabille, 1900)
- Scopula viettei Herbulot, 1992
- Scopula voeltzkowi L. B. Prout, 1934
- Semiothisa peyrierasi Viette, 1975
- Somatina figurata Warren, 1897
- Somatina lia Prout, 1915
- Sphyrocosta madecassa (Viette, 1973)
- Synclysmus niveus Butler, 1879
- Syncollesis ankalirano Viette, 1981
- Thalassodes progressa Prout, 1926
- Thalassodes quadraria Guenée, 1857
- Traminda aequipuncta Herbulot, 1984
- Traminda atroviridaria (Mabille, 1880)
- Traminda neptunaria (Guenée, 1858)
- Traminda obversata (Walker, 1861)
- Xanthodura hypocrypta Prout, 1925
- Xanthodura trucidata Butler, 1880
- Xanthorhoe malgassa Herbulot, 1954
- Xanthorhoe phyxelia Prout, 1933
- Xenimpia clenchi Viette, 1980
- Xenimpia fletcheri Herbulot, 1954
- Xenimpia tetracantha Herbulot, 1973
- Xenimpia transmarina Herbulot, 1961
- Xenimpia trizonata (Saalmüller, 1891)
- Xenostega eurhythma Prout, 1934
- Xenostega ochracea (Butler, 1879)
- Xenostega treptostiches Prout, 1934
- Xylopteryx cowani Viette, 1972
- Xylopteryx doto Prout, 1925
- Zamarada aureomarginata Pagenstecher, 1907
- Zamarada calypso Prout, 1926
- Zamarada excavata Bethune-Baker, 1913
- Zamarada griveaudi D. S. Fletcher, 1974
- Zamarada oxybeles D. S. Fletcher, 1974
- Zamarada reflexaria (Walker, 1863)
- Zamarada viettei D. S. Fletcher, 1974
- Zeuctocleora una Prout, 1929

== Glyphipterigidae ==
- Chrysocentris eupepla Meyrick, 1930
- Glyphipterix madagascariensis Viette, 1951

== Gracillariidae ==
- Acrocercops coffeifoliella (Motschulsky, 1859)
- Acrocercops guttiferella (Viette, 1951)
- Acrocercops hormista Meyrick, 1916
- Acrocercops loxias Meyrick, 1918
- Acrocercops theaeformisella Viette, 1956
- Acrocercops tricyma Meyrick, 1908
- Aristaea atrata Triberti, 1985
- Callicercops milloti (Viette, 1951)
- Caloptilia infaceta Triberti, 1987
- Caloptilia modica Triberti, 1987
- Caloptilia prosticta (Meyrick, 1909)
- Caloptilia scaenica Triberti, 1987
- Macarostola eugeniella (Viette, 1951)
- Phyllocnistis saligna (Zeller, 1839)
- Phyllonorycter lemarchandi (Viette, 1951)
- Phyllonorycter madagascariensis (Viette, 1949)
- Stomphastis adesa Triberti, 1988
- Stomphastis dodonaeae Vári, 1961
- Stomphastis eugrapta Vári, 1961
- Stomphastis thraustica (Meyrick, 1908)
- Telamoptilia cathedraea (Meyrick, 1908)
- Telamoptilia hemistacta (Meyrick, 1924)

== Heliozelidae ==
- Antispila merinaella (Viette, 1955)

== Hyblaeidae ==
- Hyblaea apricans (Boisduval, 1833)
- Hyblaea madagascariensis Viette, 1961
- Hyblaea paulianii Viette, 1961
- Hyblaea puera (Cramer, 1777)

== Immidae ==
- Moca humbertella (Viette, 1956)

== Lacturidae ==
- Gymnogramma candidella (Viette, 1963)
- Gymnogramma griveaudi (Gibeaux, 1982)
- Gymnogramma iambiodella (Viette, 1958)
- Gymnogramma luctuosa (Gibeaux, 1982)
- Gymnogramma ratovosoni (Gibeaux, 1982)
- Gymnogramma tabulatrix Meyrick, 1930
- Gymnogramma toulgoeti (Gibeaux, 1982)
- Gymnogramma viettei (Gibeaux, 1982)

== Lasiocampidae ==
- Acosmetoptera apicimacula (De Lajonquière, 1970)
- Acosmetoptera ecpluta De Lajonquière, 1972
- Acosmetoptera nubenda De Lajonquière, 1972
- Acosmetoptera phela De Lajonquière, 1972
- Acosmetoptera raharizoninai (De Lajonquière, 1970)
- Acosmetoptera sogai (De Lajonquière, 1970)
- Anchirithra insignis Butler, 1878
- Anchirithra viettei De Lajonquière, 1970
- Apatelopteryx deceptrix (Kenrick, 1914)
- Apatelopteryx phenax De Lajonquière, 1968
- Borocera attenuata (Kenrick, 1914)
- Borocera cajani Vinson, 1863
- Borocera madagascariensis Boisduval, 1833
- Borocera marginepunctata Guérin-Méneville, 1844
- Borocera mimus De Lajonquière, 1972
- Borocera nigricornis De Lajonquière, 1972
- Borocera regius De Lajonquière, 1973
- Callopizoma malgassica (Kenrick, 1914)
- Callopizoma micans De Lajonquière, 1972
- Chionodiptera nivea De Lajonquière, 1972
- Chionodiptera virginalis (Viette, 1962)
- Chrysium mesembrinus De Lajonquière, 1969
- Chrysopsyche pauliani Viette, 1962
- Closterothrix gambeyi Mabille, 1879
- Closterothrix leonina (Butler, 1882)
- Closterothrix bosei (Saalmüller, 1880)
- Closterothrix bruncki De Lajonquière, 1974
- Closterothrix diabolus (Hering, 1928)
- Closterothrix fulvipuncta (Viette, 1962)
- Closterothrix funebris De Lajonquière, 1970
- Closterothrix gambeyi Mabille, 1879
- Closterothrix goliath (Viette, 1962)
- Closterothrix goudoti Viette, 1962
- Closterothrix insularis Viette, 1962
- Closterothrix leonina (Butler, 1882)
- Closterothrix nigrosparsata Viette, 1962
- Closterothrix secernenda De Lajonquière, 1969
- Closterothrix sikorae Aurivillius, 1909
- Diaphoromorpha bellescripta De Lajonquière, 1973
- Diaphoromorpha pumilio De Lajonquière, 1972
- Diaphoromorpha tamsi (Viette, 1962)
- Endacantha albovirgata De Lajonquière, 1970
- Endacantha cleptis (Hering, 1928)
- Endacantha moka De Lajonquière, 1970
- Eupagopteryx affinis (Aurivillius, 1909)
- Eupagopteryx albolunatus (Kenrick, 1914)
- Europtera pandani De Lajonquière, 1972
- Europtera punctillata (Saalmüller, 1884)
- Gastromega badia (Saalmüller, 1878)
- Gastromega robusta De Lajonquière, 1972
- Gastromega sordida (Mabille, 1879)
- Gonometa attenuata Kenrick, 1914
- Hypotrabala regius (De Lajonquière, 1973)
- Lamprantaugia gueneana (Mabille, 1880)
- Lamprantaugia tamatavae (Guenée, 1865)
- Lechriolepis anomala Butler, 1880
- Lechriolepis diabolus Hering, 1928
- Lechriolepis fulvipuncta Viette, 1962
- Lechriolepis johannae De Lajonquière, 1970
- Lechriolepis pratti (Kenrick, 1914)
- Lechriolepis tapiae De Lajonquière, 1970
- Lerodes fulgurita (Saalmüller, 1880)
- Malacostola mediodiluta De Lajonquière, 1972
- Malacostola mollis De Lajonquière, 1970
- Malacostola mutata De Lajonquière, 1972
- Malacostola psara De Lajonquière, 1972
- Malacostola serrata De Lajonquière, 1972
- Malacostola torrefacta De Lajonquière, 1972
- Melopla abhorrens De Lajonquière, 1972
- Melopla ochracea (Viette, 1962)
- Melopla sparsipuncta (Viette, 1962)
- Napta serratilinea Guenée, 1865
- Ochanella hova (Butler, 1882)
- Ochrochroma aurantiaca (Viette, 1962)
- Ochrochroma cadoreli De Lajonquière, 1969
- Ochrochroma nepos De Lajonquière, 1969
- Ochrochroma opulenta De Lajonquière, 1969
- Ochrochroma seyrigi De Lajonquière, 1969
- Ochrochroma simplex (Aurivillius, 1909)
- Odontocheilopteryx malagassy Viette, 1962
- Odontocheilopteryx meridionalis Viette, 1962
- Philotherma goliath (Viette, 1962)
- Phoberopsis ferox (Kenrick, 1914)
- Phoenicladocera griveaudi De Lajonquière, 1972
- Phoenicladocera herbuloti De Lajonquière, 1972
- Phoenicladocera lajonquierei Viette, 1981
- Phoenicladocera merina De Lajonquière, 1970
- Phoenicladocera nitescens De Lajonquière, 1972
- Phoenicladocera parvinota (Hering, 1929)
- Phoenicladocera toulgoeti De Lajonquière, 1972
- Phoenicladocera turtur De Lajonquière, 1972
- Phoenicladocera viettei De Lajonquière, 1970
- Phoenicladocera vulpicolor (Kenrick, 1914)
- Phoenicladocera wintreberti De Lajonquière, 1972
- Phoenicladocera xanthogramma De Lajonquière, 1972
- Raphipeza graphiptera (Saalmüller, 1880)
- Raphipeza orientalis Viette, 1962
- Raphipeza perineti Viette, 1962
- Raphipeza turbata (Butler, 1879)
- Sunnepha aerea De Lajonquière, 1970
- Sunnepha livens De Lajonquière, 1970
- Sunnepha minuta De Lajonquière, 1970
- Sunnepha serta De Lajonquière, 1970

== Lecithoceridae ==
- Epimactis albipunctella Viette, 1968
- Epimactis crocella Viette, 1956
- Epimactis incertella Viette, 1956
- Epimactis nigricella Viette, 1968
- Epimactis ochreocapitella Viette, 1968
- Epimactis tortricella Viette, 1968
- Idiopteryx adelella (Viette, 1955)
- Idiopteryx descarpentriesella Viette, 1954
- Idiopteryx marionella Viette, 1954
- Idiopteryx obitsyella Viette, 1986
- Idiopteryx tananaella Viette, 1985
- Lecithocera acrosphales Meyrick, 1918
- Lecithocera andrianella Viette, 1968
- Lecithocera ankasokella Viette, 1968
- Lecithocera bariella Viette, 1958
- Lecithocera cameronella Viette, 1957
- Lecithocera decaryella Viette, 1955
- Lecithocera hiarakella Viette, 1988
- Lecithocera hildebrandtella Viette, 1956
- Lecithocera lecithocerella Viette, 1956
- Lecithocera ojejyella Viette, 1986
- Lecithocera paulianella Viette, 1955
- Lecithocera perrierella Viette, 1985
- Lecithocera pyxinodes Meyrick, 1918
- Lecithocera rabenoroi Viette, 1988
- Lecithocera radamella Viette, 1968
- Lecithocera ranavaloella Viette, 1968
- Lecithocera randimella Viette, 1956
- Mexytocerus enigmaticus Viette, 1989
- Thubdora decavella (Viette, 1955)
- Thubdora mocquerysella (Viette, 1955)
- Torodora kambanella (Viette, 1986)
- Torodora masoalella (Viette, 1955)

== Limacodidae ==
- Ambaliha exsanguis Saalmüller, 1880
- Ambaliha vadoni (Viette, 1965)
- Andaingo ecclesiastica Hering, 1928
- Ankijabe griveaudi Viette, 1980
- Ankijabe lucens (Hering, 1957)
- Boisduvalodes tamatavana (Oberthür, 1922)
- Crothaema sericea Butler, 1880
- Fletcherodes brunnea (Viette, 1951)
- Heringocena andobo (Viette, 1965)
- Heringocena difficilis (Viette, 1965)
- Heringocena seyrigi Viette, 1980
- Heringodes robinsoni (Viette, 1965)
- Heringyra hannemanni Viette, 1980
- Heringyra rectestrigata (Hering, 1957)
- Heringyra schroederi Viette, 1980
- Latoia albifrons Guérin-Méneville, 1844
- Latoia catalai Viette, 1980
- Latoia geminatus (Hering, 1957)
- Latoia heringi (Viette, 1965)
- Latoia heringiana Viette, 1980
- Latoia lemuriensis (Viette, 1967)
- Latoia parniodes Hering, 1957
- Latoia peyrierasi (Viette, 1965)
- Latoia procerus (Hering, 1957)
- Latoia pumilus (Hering, 1957)
- Latoia singularis (Butler, 1878)
- Latoia vadoni Viette, 1980
- Latoia viettei (Hering, 1957)
- Lemuria gracilis (Butler, 1882)
- Lemuricomes milloti Viette, 1980
- Lemuricomes niveolineatus Hering, 1957
- Macrosemyra tenebrosa Butler, 1882
- Malgassica incerta Hering, 1957
- Malgassica peregrina Hering, 1957
- Malgassica tsaratanana Viette, 1980
- Mandoto orthogramma (Hering, 1954)
- Mandoto sogai (Viette, 1965)
- Mandoto turlini Viette, 1980
- Marmorata bradleyi Viette, 1980
- Marmorata fletcheri Viette, 1980
- Marmorata marmorata (Saalmüller, 1880)
- Marmorata pauliani Viette, 1980
- Marmorata vaovao Viette, 1980
- Narosa castanea Mabille, 1900
- Omocenops micacea (Butler, 1882)
- Omocenops simillimus Hering, 1957
- Parasa affinis Mabille, 1890
- Parasa ankalirano Viette, 1980
- Parasa cambouei (Mabille, 1890)
- Parasa dubiefi Viette, 1975
- Parasa ebenaui (Saalmüller, 1878)
- Parasa imerina (Viette, 1980)
- Parasa lemuriensis Viette, 1967
- Parasa parniodes (Hering, 1957)
- Parasa reginula Saalmüller, 1884
- Parasa singularis Butler, 1878
- Parasa valida Butler, 1879
- Parasa villosipes Strand, 1911
- Paryphantina argentifera Hering, 1933
- Prosternidia metallica Saalmüller, 1884
- Pseudolatoia humilis (Mabille, 1890)
- Pseudolatoia oculata Hering, 1957
- Pseudolatoia viettei Hering, 1954
- Pseudomocena albens Hering, 1957
- Psythiarodes mahafaly Viette, 1980
- Thliptocnemis barbipes Mabille, 1900
- Thliptocnemis heringi (Viette, 1965)
- Thliptocnemis pinguis (Saalmüller, 1880)
- Vietteiola viettei Hering, 1957
- Ximacodes malagasy Viette, 1980
- Ximacodes pyrosoma (Butler, 1882)
- Ximacodes subrufa (Hering, 1957)

== Lymantriidae ==
- Abakabaka fuliginosa (Saalmüller, 1884)
- Abakabaka phasiana (Butler, 1882)
- Alina ochroderoea (Mabille, 1897)
- Ankova belessichares (Collenette, 1936)
- Ankova lignea (Butler, 1879)
- Cadorela translucida Griveaud, 1973
- Collenettema chionoptera (Collenette, 1936)
- Collenettema crocipes (Boisduval, 1833)
- Crorema viettei Collenette, 1960
- Croremopsis argenna (Mabille, 1900)
- Dasychira bata Collenette, 1939
- Dasychira butleri (Swinhoe, 1923)
- Dasychira chloebapha Collenette, 1930
- Dasychira colini (Mabille, 1893)
- Dasychira maculata Griveaud, 1974
- Dasychira nolana (Mabille, 1882)
- Dasychira problematica Hering, 1926
- Dasychira viettei Collenette, 1954
- Eopirga candida Hering, 1926
- Eopirga heptasticta (Mabille, 1878)
- Erika analalava Griveaud, 1976
- Eudasychira ampliata (Butler, 1878)
- Eudasychira audeoudi (Collenette, 1939)
- Eudasychira aurantiaca (Kenrick, 1914)
- Eudasychira aureotincta (Kenrick, 1914)
- Eudasychira diaereta (Collenette, 1959)
- Eudasychira galactina (Mabille, 1880)
- Eudasychira leucopsaroma (Collenette, 1959)
- Euproctis apoblepta Collenette, 1953
- Euproctis emilei Griveaud, 1973
- Euproctis eurybia Collenette, 1959
- Euproctis fervida (Walker, 1863)
- Euproctis fleuriotii (Guérin-Méneville, 1862)
- Euproctis incommoda (Butler, 1882)
- Euproctis juliettae Griveaud, 1973
- Euproctis lemuria (Hering, 1926)
- Euproctis limonea (Butler, 1882)
- Euproctis mahafalensis Griveaud, 1973
- Euproctis marojejya Griveaud, 1973
- Euproctis ochrea (Butler, 1878)
- Euproctis oxyptera Collenette, 1936
- Euproctis producta (Walker, 1863)
- Euproctis putilla Saalmüller, 1884
- Euproctis sanguigutta Hampson, 1905
- Euproctis stenobia Collenette, 1959
- Euproctis straminicolor Janse, 1915
- Euproctis titania Butler, 1879
- Fanala abbreviata (Kenrick, 1914)
- Gallienica ambahona (Collenette, 1954)
- Gallienica andringitra Griveaud, 1977
- Gallienica antongila Griveaud, 1977
- Gallienica brunea Griveaud, 1977
- Gallienica candida Griveaud, 1977
- Gallienica didya Griveaud, 1977
- Gallienica griveaudi (Collenette, 1959)
- Gallienica lakato Griveaud, 1977
- Gallienica lineata Griveaud, 1977
- Gallienica maligna (Butler, 1882)
- Gallienica mandraka Griveaud, 1977
- Gallienica nosivola (Collenette, 1959)
- Gallienica sanguinea (Hering, 1926)
- Gallienica sphenosema (Collenette, 1959)
- Gallienica viettei Griveaud, 1977
- Gallienica violacea Griveaud, 1977
- Griveaudyria mascarena (Butler, 1878)
- Homoeomeria cretosa (Saalmüller, 1884)
- Homoeomeria iroceraea (Collenette, 1959)
- Jabaina ania (Hering, 1926)
- Jabaina ithystropha (Collenette, 1939)
- Jabaina uteles (Collenette, 1936)
- Kintana ocellatula (Hering, 1926)
- Labordea chalcoptera(Collenette, 1936)
- Labordea hedilacea(Collenette, 1936)
- Labordea leucolineataGriveaud, 1977
- Labordea malgassica(Kenrick, 1914)
- Labordea marmor(Mabille, 1880)
- Labordea prasina(Butler, 1882)
- Labordea suareziGriveaud, 1977
- Laelia croperoides Hering, 1926
- Laeliolina paetula Hering, 1926
- Lanitra hexamitobalia (Collenette, 1936)
- Leptepilepta diaphanella (Mabille, 1897)
- Leptepilepta umbrata (Griveaud, 1973)
- Leucoma lechrisemata Collenette, 1959
- Lymantica binotata (Mabille, 1880)
- Lymantica brunneata (Kenrick, 1914)
- Lymantica canariensis (Kenrick, 1914)
- Lymantica castanea (Kenrick, 1914)
- Lymantica castaneostriata (Kenrick, 1914)
- Lymantica dubia (Kenrick, 1914)
- Lymantica dulcinea (Butler, 1882)
- Lymantica hypobolimaea (Collenette, 1959)
- Lymantica joannisi (Le Cerf, 1921)
- Lymantica kenricki (Swinhoe, 1923)
- Lymantica lamda (Collenette, 1936)
- Lymantica leucophaes (Collenette, 1936)
- Lymantica malgassica (Kenrick, 1914)
- Lymantica phaeosericea (Mabille, 1884)
- Lymantica polycyma (Collenette, 1936)
- Lymantica polysticta (Collenette, 1929)
- Lymantica pruinosa (Butler, 1879)
- Lymantica rosea (Butler, 1879)
- Lymantica rufofusca Mabille, 1900
- Lymantica russula (Collenette, 1933)
- Lymantica rusticana (Hering, 1927)
- Lymantica suarezia (Mabille, 1897)
- Lymantica velutina (Mabille, 1879)
- Lymantria rebuti (Poujade, 1889)
- Lymantria rhodophora (Mabille, 1879)
- Marbla divisa (Walker, 1855)
- Marblepsis ochrobasis Collenette, 1938
- Masoandro peculiaris (Butler, 1879)
- Masoandro polia (Collenette, 1936)
- Mpanjaka albovirida (Griveaud, 1970)
- Mpanjaka betschi (Griveaud, 1974)
- Mpanjaka collenettei (Griveaud, 1974)
- Mpanjaka conioptera (Collenette, 1936)
- Mpanjaka cyrtozona (Collenette, 1936)
- Mpanjaka disjunctifascia (Collenette, 1936)
- Mpanjaka elegans (Butler, 1882)
- Mpanjaka euthyzona (Collenette, 1959)
- Mpanjaka gentilis (Butler, 1879)
- Mpanjaka grandidieri (Butler, 1882)
- Mpanjaka junctifascia (Collenette, 1936)
- Mpanjaka leucopicta (Collenette, 1936)
- Mpanjaka montana (Griveaud, 1974)
- Mpanjaka nigrosparsata (Kenrick, 1914)
- Mpanjaka olsoufieffae (Collenette, 1936)
- Mpanjaka pastor (Butler, 1882)
- Mpanjaka perinetensis (Collenette, 1936)
- Mpanjaka pyrsonota (Collenette, 1939)
- Mpanjaka renominata (Strand, 1915)
- Mpanjaka titan (Collenette, 1959)
- Mpanjaka vibicipennis (Butler, 1879)
- Mpanjaka viola (Butler, 1879)
- Naroma madecassa Griveaud, 1971
- Noliproctis milupa Nye, 1980
- Noliproctis sogai (Griveaud, 1974)
- Nolosia marmorata Hampson, 1900
- Numenoides grandis Butler, 1879
- Ogoa melanocera (Mabille, 1878)
- Ogoa oberthueri Rothschild, 1916
- Ogoa vitrina (Mabille, 1878)
- Orana grammodes (Hering, 1926)
- Orgyia malagassica Kenrick, 1913
- Peloroses praestans (Saalmüller, 1884)
- Pirgula delicata Griveaud, 1973
- Pirgula jordani (Hering, 1926)
- Pirgula melanoma Collenette, 1936
- Pirgula monopunctata Griveaud, 1973
- Pirgula polyopha Collenette, 1959
- Pirgula sexpunctata Griveaud, 1973
- Porthesaroa aureopsis Hering, 1926
- Porthesaroa brunea Griveaud, 1973
- Porthesaroa lithoides (Collenette, 1936)
- Porthesaroa parvula (Kenrick, 1914)
- Porthesaroa procincta Saalmüller, 1880
- Psalis punctuligera Mabille, 1880
- Pyramocera barica (Mabille, 1878)
- Radamaria miselioides (Kenrick, 1914)
- Radamaria zena (Hering, 1926)
- Rahona albilunula (Collenette, 1936)
- Rahona compseuta (Collenette, 1939)
- Rivotra viridipicta (Kenrick, 1914)
- Rivotra zonobathra (Collenette, 1936)
- Salvatgea bipuncta (Hering, 1926)
- Scaphocera marginepunctata (Saalmüller, 1878)
- Scaphocera turlini Griveaud, 1973
- Stenaroa crocea Griveaud, 1977
- Stenaroa flavescens Griveaud, 1977
- Stenaroa ignepicta Hampson, 1910
- Stenaroa miniata (Kenrick, 1914)
- Stenaroa rubriflava Griveaud, 1973
- Turlina punctata Griveaud, 1976
- Varatra acosmeta (Collenette, 1939)
- Viettema ratovosoni (Viette, 1967)
- Vohitra melissograpta (Collenette, 1936)
- Volana lichenodes (Collenette, 1936)
- Volana mniara (Collenette, 1936)
- Volana phloeodes (Collenette, 1936)
- Zavana acroleuca (Hering, 1926)
- Zavana iodnephes (Collenette, 1936)

== Lyonetiidae ==
- Leucoptera coffeella (Guérin-Méneville, 1842)

== Metarbelidae ==
- Saalmulleria dubiefi Viette, 1974
- Saalmulleria stumpffi (Saalmüller, 1884)

== Nepticulidae ==
- Ectoedemia scobleella Minet, 2004

== Noctuidae ==
- Acantholipes transiens Berio, 1956
- Acantholipes trimeni Felder & Rogenhofer, 1874
- Achaea balteata de Joannis, 1912
- Achaea boris (Geyer, 1837)
- Achaea catella Guenée, 1852
- Achaea dejeanii (Boisduval, 1833)
- Achaea dmoe L. B. Prout, 1919
- Achaea ebenaui (Saalmüller, 1880)
- Achaea euryplaga (Hampson, 1913)
- Achaea finita (Guenée, 1852)
- Achaea illustrata Walker, 1858
- Achaea imperatrix (Saalmüller, 1881)
- Achaea infinita (Guenée, 1852)
- Achaea lenzi (Saalmüller, 1881)
- Achaea leucopasa (Walker, 1858)
- Achaea lienardi (Boisduval, 1833)
- Achaea mercatoria (Fabricius, 1775)
- Achaea oedipodina Mabille, 1879
- Achaea orthogramma (Mabille, 1879)
- Achaea praestans (Guenée, 1852)
- Achaea radama Felder & Rogenhofer, 1874
- Achaea retrorsa Hampson, 1913
- Achaea stumpffii Saalmüller, 1880
- Achaea trapezoides (Guenée, 1862)
- Achaea violaceofascia (Saalmüller, 1891)
- Acontia ampijoroa (Viette, 1965)
- Acontia antica Walker, 1862
- Acontia bollandi Hacker, Legrain & Fibiger, 2008
- Acontia delphinensis (Viette, 1968)
- Acontia gloriosa (Kenrick, 1917)
- Acontia imitatrix Wallengren, 1856
- Acontia laurenconi (Viette, 1965)
- Acontia luteola Saalmüller, 1891
- Acontia malagasy (Viette, 1965)
- Acontia malgassica Mabille, 1881
- Acontia microptera Mabille, 1879
- Acontia miegii Mabille, 1882
- Acontia paphos Viette, 1973
- Acontia pauliani (Viette, 1965)
- Acontia splendida (Rothschild, 1924)
- Acontia transducta (Viette, 1958)
- Acontia transfigurata Wallengren, 1856
- Acrapex brunnea Hampson, 1910
- Acrapex peracuta Berio, 1956
- Acrapex undulata Berio, 1956
- Adisura malagassica Rothschild, 1924
- Adrapsa ambrensis Viette, 1965
- Adrapsa radiata Viette, 1965
- Agrapha gammaloba (Hampson, 1910)
- Agrotis biconica Kollar, 1844
- Agrotis consentanea Mabille, 1880
- Agrotis ipsilon (Hufnagel, 1766)
- Agrotis longidentifera (Hampson, 1903)
- Agrotis radama Viette, 1958
- Agrotis segetum ([Denis & Schiffermüller], 1775)
- Aletia angustipennis (Saalmüller, 1891)
- Aletia ankaratra Rungs, 1956
- Aletia circulus (Saalmüller, 1880)
- Aletia decaryi (Boursin & Rungs, 1952)
- Aletia duplex Rungs, 1956
- Aletia fallaciosa (Rungs, 1956)
- Aletia heimi Rungs, 1956
- Aletia infrargyrea (Saalmüller, 1891)
- Aletia milloti (Rungs, 1956)
- Aletia operosa (Saalmüller, 1891)
- Aletia pyrausta (Hampson, 1913)
- Aletia viettei (Rungs, 1956)
- Amazonides confluxa (Saalmüller, 1891)
- Amphia gigantea Viette, 1958
- Amphia sogai Viette, 1967
- Amyna axis Guenée, 1852
- Amyna punctum (Fabricius, 1794)
- Ancarista laminifera (Saalmüller, 1878)
- Ancistris saturnina Mabille, 1898
- Andrianam poinimerina Viette, 1954
- Androlymnia malgassica Viette, 1965
- Anedhella boisduvali Viette, 1965
- Anoba cowani Viette, 1966
- Anomis alluaudi Viette, 1965
- Anomis auragoides (Guenée, 1852)
- Anomis campanalis (Mabille, 1880)
- Anomis flava (Fabricius, 1775)
- Anomis lavaudeni Viette, 1968
- Anomis lophognatha Hampson, 1926
- Anomis mandraka Viette, 1965
- Antiblemma acrosema (Mabille, 1900)
- Anticarsia rubricans (Boisduval, 1833)
- Antigodasa rufodiscalis (Rothschild, 1896)
- Antiophlebia griveaudi Viette, 1966
- Apamea griveaudi Viette, 1967
- Apamea macronephra Berio, 1960
- Apamea roedereri Viette, 1967
- Apospasta intricata (Saalmüller, 1891)
- Arctiopais ambusta (Mabille, 1881)
- Argyphia arcifera (Mabille, 1881)
- Argyrogramma signata (Fabricius, 1775)
- Argyrolopha trisignata (Mabille, 1900)
- Arrothia bicolor Rothschild, 1896
- Arrothia gueneianum Viette, 1954
- Arsina silenalis Guenée, 1862
- Asota borbonica (Boisduval, 1833)
- Asota concolora (Swinhoe, 1903)
- Asota diastropha (Prout, 1918)
- Athetis albispilosa (Saalmüller, 1880)
- Athetis cryptisirias Viette, 1958
- Athetis denisi Viette, 1963
- Athetis fragosa Viette, 1958
- Athetis gaedei Berio, 1955
- Athetis glaucoides (Berio, 1959)
- Athetis improbabilis Berio, 1966
- Athetis heringi Viette, 1963
- Athetis humberti Viette, 1963
- Athetis ignava (Guenée, 1852)
- Athetis milloti Viette, 1963
- Athetis nitens (Saalmüller, 1891)
- Athetis oculatissima Berio, 1956
- Athetis perineti Viette, 1963
- Athetis perparva Berio, 1966
- Athetis pilosissima Berio, 1956
- Athetis radama Viette, 1961
- Athetis satellitia (Hampson, 1902)
- Athetis sicaria Viette, 1958
- Athetis siccata Viette, 1958
- Athetis sobria Berio, 1956
- Athetis spaelotidia (Butler, 1879)
- Athyrma saalmulleri Mabille, 1881
- Attonda adspersa (Felder & Rogenhofer, 1874)
- Aucha tenebricosa (Saalmüller, 1891)
- Audea agrotidea (Mabille, 1880)
- Audea delphinensis (Viette, 1966)
- Audea vadoni (Viette, 1966)
- Aulocheta parallelalis (Mabille, 1880)
- Autoba costimacula (Saalmüller, 1880)
- Autoba malgassica (Berio, 1954)
- Autoba olivacea (Walker, 1858)
- Axiopoeniella lasti Rothschild, 1910
- Axiopoeniella laymerisa (Grandidier, 1867)
- Axylia annularis Saalmüller, 1891
- Azeta reuteri Saalmüller, 1881
- Bamra cazeti (Mabille, 1893)
- Berioana limbulata (Berio, 1956)
- Berioana pauliani Viette, 1963
- Brevipecten dufayi Viette, 1976
- Brevipecten malagasy Viette, 1965
- Brithys crini (Fabricius, 1775)
- Brithysana maura (Saalmüller, 1891)
- Brithysana pauliani Viette, 1967
- Callicereon heterochroa (Mabille, 1879)
- Callicereon mabillei Viette, 1965
- Callixena versicolora Saalmüller, 1891
- Callixena viettei (Berio, 1956)
- Callopistria intermissa Saalmüller, 1891
- Callopistria latreillei (Duponchel, 1827)
- Callopistria maillardi (Guenée, 1862)
- Callopistria malagasy Viette, 1965
- Callopistria miranda (Saalmüller, 1880)
- Callopistria pauliani Berio, 1956
- Callopistria promiscua Saalmüller, 1891
- Callopistria randimbyi Viette, 1965
- Callopistria rectilinea Saalmüller, 1891
- Callopistria tarsipilosa Berio, 1959
- Callopistria yerburii Butler, 1884
- Callyna perfecta Berio, 1956
- Callyna robinsoni Viette, 1965
- Caradrina asinina Saalmüller, 1891
- Caradrina glaucistis Hampson, 1902
- Caryonopera malgassica Berio, 1956
- Catalana vohilava Viette, 1954
- Catephia squamosa (Wallengren, 1856)
- Catephia triphaenoides Viette, 1965
- Centrarthra malagasy Viette, 1972
- Cerocala decaryi Griveaud & Viette, 1962
- Cerocala ilia Viette, 1973
- Cerocala ratovosoni Viette, 1973
- Cerocala subrufa Griveaud & Viette, 1962
- Cerocala vermiculosa Herrich-Schäffer, [1858]
- Cerynea fissilinea Hampson, 1910
- Cerynea ignealis Hampson, 1910
- Cerynea porphyrea Hampson, 1910
- Cerynea thermesialis (Walker, 1866)
- Chalciope delta (Boisduval, 1833)
- Chasmina candida (Walker, 1865)
- Chasmina malagasy Viette, 1965
- Chasmina tibialis (Fabricius, 1775)
- Chrysodeixis chalcites (Esper, 1789)
- Claterna ochreoplaga Viette, 1966
- Claterna perinetensis Viette, 1966
- Claterna sparsipuncta Viette, 1966
- Coelophoris andasy Viette, 1965
- Coelophoris ankasoka Viette, 1965
- Coelophoris lakato Viette, 1965
- Coelophoris lucifer Viette, 1972
- Coelophoris marojejy Viette, 1965
- Coelophoris pluriplaga Viette, 1956
- Coelophoris sogai Viette, 1965
- Coelophoris trilineata Mabille, 1900
- Colobochyla mabillealis (Viette, 1954)
- Colobochyla saalmuelleralis (Viette, 1954)
- Condica capensis (Guenée, 1852)
- Condica conducta (Walker, 1857)
- Condica pauperata (Walker, 1858)
- Conservula cinisigna de Joannis, 1906
- Conservula malagasa (Gaede, 1915)
- Conservula rosacea Saalmüller, 1891
- Conservula subrosacea (Viette, 1958)
- Corgatha chopardi (Berio, 1954)
- Corgatha coenogramma (Mabille, 1900)
- Corgatha omopisoides (Berio, 1954)
- Corgatha ozolicoides (Berio, 1954)
- Corgathalia viettei Berio, 1966
- Ctenoplusia aurisuta (Dufay, 1968)
- Ctenoplusia fracta (Walker, 1857)
- Ctenoplusia furcifera (Walker, 1857)
- Ctenoplusia laqueata (Dufay, 1968)
- Ctenoplusia limbirena (Guenée, 1852)
- Ctenoplusia rhodographa (Dufay, 1968)
- Cucullia aplana Viette, 1958
- Cucullia malagassa Viette, 1958
- Cucullia ruficeps (Hampson, 1906)
- Cyligramma disturbans (Walker, 1858)
- Cyligramma duplex Guenée, 1852
- Cyligramma fluctuosa (Drury, 1773)
- Cyligramma joa Boisduval, 1833
- Cyligramma latona (Cramer, 1775)
- Cyligramma limacina (Guérin-Méneville, 1832)
- Cyligramma magus (Guérin-Méneville, [1844])
- Daphoeneura fasciata Butler, 1878
- Deinypena biplagalis Viette, 1954
- Deinypena ranomafana Viette, 1966
- Diadocis longimacula Saalmüller, 1891
- Diadocis remyi (Viette, 1954)
- Diadocis sarodrano Viette, 1982
- Diaphone delamarei Viette, 1963
- Dicerogastra madecassa Viette, 1972
- Dichromia carninalis Viette, 1956
- Dichromia isoplocalis Viette, 1956
- Dichromia nasuta (Mabille, 1884)
- Dichromia rationalis Viette, 1956
- Dichromia sieglinde Viette, 1956
- Dichromia xanthaspisalis Viette, 1956
- Digama malgassica Toulgoët, 1954
- Digama sagittata Gaede, 1926
- Digama septempuncta Hampson, 1910
- Dysgonia angularis (Boisduval, 1833)
- Dysgonia berioi Viette, 1968
- Dysgonia delphinensis (Viette, 1968)
- Dysgonia derogans (Walker, 1858)
- Dysgonia digona (Mabille, 1879)
- Dysgonia laurentensis (Viette, 1968)
- Dysgonia malgassica (Viette, 1968)
- Dysgonia masama (Griveaud, 1981)
- Dysgonia torrida (Guenée, 1852)
- Egnasia berioi Viette, 1954
- Egnasia dolabrata Berio, 1958
- Egnasia macularia Mabille, 1900
- Egnasia obscurata Mabille, 1898
- Egnasia vicaria (Walker, 1866)
- Elyptron annularis Viette, 1963
- Elyptron berioi Viette, 1958
- Elyptron catalai Viette, 1963
- Elyptron cinctum Saalmüller, 1891
- Elyptron schroederi Viette, 1963
- Elyptron timorosa (Berio, 1956)
- Entomogramma pardus Guenée, 1852
- Episparis malagasy Viette, 1966
- Episparis vitrea (Saalmüller, 1891)
- Ercheia bergeri Viette, 1968
- Ercheia mahagonica (Saalmüller, 1891)
- Erebus walkeri (Butler, 1875)
- Ericeia albangula (Saalmüller, 1880)
- Ericeia biplagiella Viette, 1966
- Ericeia congregata (Walker, 1858)
- Ericeia congressa (Walker, 1858)
- Ericeia lituraria (Saalmüller, 1880)
- Ethiopica befasy Viette, 1965
- Eublarginea argentifera Berio, 1966
- Eublemma acarodes Swinhoe, 1907
- Eublemma apicipunctum (Saalmüller, 1891)
- Eublemma brygooi (Viette, 1967)
- Eublemma chopardi Berio, 1954
- Eublemma daphoenoides Berio, 1941
- Eublemma dissecta (Saalmüller, 1891)
- Eublemma decora (Walker, 1869)
- Eublemma exigua (Walker, 1858)
- Eublemma fasciola (Saalmüller, 1891)
- Eublemma geometriana Viette, 1981
- Eublemma insignifica Rothschild, 1924
- Eublemma leptinia (Mabille, 1900)
- Eublemma mesophaea Hampson, 1910
- Eublemma minima (Guenée, 1852)
- Eublemma postrosea Gaede, 1935
- Eublemma postrufoides Poole, 1989
- Eublemma ragusanoides (Berio, 1954)
- Eublemma rufoscastanea Rothschild, 1924
- Eublemma subrufula Rothschild, 1924
- Eublemma tephroclytioides Rothschild, 1924
- Eublemma viettei (Berio, 1954)
- Eublemmoides apicimacula (Mabille, 1880)
- Eudaphaenura catalai (Viette, 1954)
- Eudaphaenura griveaudi (Viette, 1961)
- Eudaphaenura splendens (Viette, 1954)
- Eudocima euryzona (Hampson, 1926)
- Eudocima formosa Griveaud & Viette, 1962
- Eudocima fullonia (Clerck, 1764)
- Eudocima imperator (Guérin-Méneville, 1832)
- Eudrapa sogai Viette, 1965
- Euippodes biplagula (Heyden, 1891)
- Eulocastra incognita Berio, 1954
- Eulocastra neoexcisa Berio, 1954
- Eustrotia albigutta Berio, 1959
- Eustrotia divisa (Saalmüller, 1891)
- Eustrotia hemicycla Berio, 1959
- Eustrotia manga Viette, 1982
- Eustrotia micardoides Berio, 1954
- Eustrotia novogonia (Berio, 1955)
- Eutelephia aureopicta (Kenrick, 1917)
- Eutelia amatrix Walker, 1858
- Eutelia blandiatrix (Guenée, 1852)
- Eutelia callichroma (Distant, 1901)
- Eutelia histrio (Saalmüller, 1880)
- Eutelia mesogona Hampson, 1905
- Eutelia ocularis (Saalmüller, 1891)
- Eutelia snelleni Saalmüller, 1881
- Eutelia subrubens (Mabille, 1890)
- Feliniopsis africana (Schaus & Clements, 1893)
- Feliniopsis annosa (Viette, 1963)
- Feliniopsis berioi (Viette, 1963)
- Feliniopsis consummata (Walker, 1857)
- Feliniopsis hoplista (Viette, 1963)
- Feliniopsis milloti (Viette, 1961)
- Feliniopsis segreta (Berio, 1966)
- Feliniopsis tenera (Viette, 1963)
- Feliniopsis tulipifera (Saalmüller, 1891)
- Fletcherea gemmella (Saalmüller, 1891)
- Fletcherea minuscula (Kenrick, 1917)
- Fletcherea pauliani Viette, 1961
- Fletcherea perrieri Viette, 1961
- Fletcherea pratti Viette, 1961
- Fodina afflicta Berio, 1959
- Fodina analamerana Viette, 1966
- Fodina antsianaka Viette, 1966
- Fodina decussis (Saalmüller, 1891)
- Fodina flacourti Viette, 1982
- Fodina hayesi Viette, 1981
- Fodina insignis (Butler, 1880)
- Fodina laurentensis Viette, 1966
- Fodina mabillei Viette, 1966
- Fodina madagascariensis Viette, 1966
- Fodina malagasy Viette, 1966
- Fodina matacassi Viette, 1982
- Fodina maudavei Viette, 1982
- Fodina megalesia Viette, 1966
- Fodina pauliani Viette, 1966
- Fodina rhodotaenia (Mabille, 1879)
- Fodina sakalava Viette, 1966
- Fodina sogai Viette, 1966
- Fodina viettei Berio, 1959
- Fodina vieui Viette, 1966
- Gaedonea rosealutea Berio, 1966
- Gesonia elongalis (Viette, 1954)
- Gesonia inscitia (Swinhoe, 1885)
- Gesonia obeditalis Walker, 1859
- Gnamptonyx australis Viette, 1965
- Gnamptonyx limbalis Strand, 1914
- Godasa sidae (Fabricius, 1793)
- Gondysia pertorrida Berio, 1955
- Gracilodes nysa Guenée, 1852
- Grammodes bifasciata (Petagna, 1787)
- Grammodes congenita Walker, 1858
- Grammodes stolida (Fabricius, 1775)
- Gyrtona erebenna (Mabille, 1900)
- Gyrtona malgassica Kenrick, 1917
- Hadena transcursa Saalmüller, 1891
- Helicoverpa armigera (Hübner, [1808])
- Heliophisma klugii (Boisduval, 1833)
- Heliothis metachrisea (Hampson, 1903)
- Heliothis posttriphaena (Rothschild, 1924)
- Hemiceratoides hieroglyphica (Saalmüller, 1891)
- Homonacna cadoreli (Viette, 1968)
- Homonacna duberneti (Viette, 1968)
- Homonacna zebrina (Viette, 1968)
- Hondryches gueneei (Viette, 1966)
- Honeyia dia (Viette, 1972)
- Huebnerius dux (Saalmüller, 1881)
- Hydrillodes pyraustalis (Viette, 1954)
- Hydrillodes uliginosalis Guenée, 1854
- Hypena abyssinialis Guenée, 1854
- Hypena bigrammica Saalmüller, 1880
- Hypena conscitalis Walker, 1866
- Hypena cowani Viette, 1968
- Hypena erikae Lödl, 1994
- Hypena diakonoffi Viette, 1976
- Hypena erikae Lödl, 1994
- Hypena fusculalis Saalmüller, 1880
- Hypena fuscomaculalis Saalmüller, 1880
- Hypena griveaudi Viette, 1968
- Hypena jusssalis (Walker, 1859)
- Hypena kingdoni Viette, 1968
- Hypena laceratalis Walker, 1859
- Hypena laetalis Walker, 1859
- Hypena lividalis (Hübner, 1790)
- Hypena mainty Viette, 1979
- Hypena malagasy (Viette, 1968)
- Hypena nasutalis Guenée, 1854
- Hypena neoplyta Prout, 1925)
- Hypena obacerralis Walker, [1859]
- Hypena obscurobasalis Saalmüller, 1880
- Hypena ophiusinalis Mabille, 1879
- Hypena polycyma Hampson, 1902
- Hypena sabinis Lödl, 1994
- Hypena striolalis Aurivillius, 1910
- Hypena subvittalis Walker, 1866
- Hypena toyi (Viette, 1968)
- Hypena varialis Walker, 1866
- Hypena veronikae Lödl, 1994
- Hypena verticalis Hampson, 1910
- Hypersophtha falcata Berio, 1954
- Hypobleta viettei Berio, 1954
- Hypocala florens Mabille, 1879
- Hypopyra allardi (Oberthür, 1878)
- Hypopyra malgassica Mabille, 1879
- Hypopyra megalesia Mabille, 1880
- Hypospila contortalis (Mabille, 1880)
- Hypospila laurentensis Viette, 1966
- Hypospila trimacula Saalmüller, 1891
- Hypsiforma bicolor (Mabille, 1879)
- Hypsiforma concolora (Swinhoe, 1903)
- Hypsiforma hypsoides (Butler, 1879)
- Hypsiforma lambertoni Oberthür, 1923
- Hypsiforma toulgoeti Viette, 1987
- Iambia volasira Viette, 1968
- Idia serralis (Mabille, 1880)
- Ilyrgis subsignata Mabille, 1900
- Ipermarca monovittata Berio, 1966
- Janseodes melanospila (Guenée, 1852)
- Kenrickodes griseata (Kenrick, 1917)
- Kenrickodes michauxi Viette, 1968
- Kenrickodes pauliani Viette, 1965
- Kenrickodes rubidata (Kenrick, 1917)
- Kenrickodes semiumbrosa (Saalmüller, 1891)
- Kenrickodes titanica (Hampson, 1910)
- Kenrickodes toulgoeti Viette, 1965
- Laelapia notata Butler, 1879
- Lepidodelta stolifera (Saalmüller, 1891)
- Lepidodelta vadoni (Viette, 1965)
- Leucania carneotincta (Kenrick, 1917)
- Leucania insulicola Guenée, 1852
- Leucania melianoides Möschler, 1883
- Leucania phaea Hampson, 1902
- Leucania prominens (Walker, 1856)
- Leucania pseudoloreyi (Rungs, 1953)
- Leucania simplaria Saalmüller, 1891
- Leucotelia ochreoplagata (Kenrick, 1917)
- Leumicamia graminicolens (Butler, 1878)
- Lithacodia albannularis Berio, 1954
- Lithacodia armilla (Saalmüller, 1891)
- Lithacodia blandula (Guenée, 1862)
- Lithacodia cupreofuscoides Berio, 1954
- Lithacodia decorina Berio, 1954
- Lithacodia flavofimbria Saalmüller, 1891
- Lithacodia mabillei Berio, 1954
- Lithacodia metachrysa Hampson, 1910
- Lithacodia monorbis Berio, 1960
- Lithacodia mysteriosa Berio, 1954
- Lithacodia praeapicilinea Berio, 1964
- Lithacodia rubrilis Berio, 1954
- Lithacodia scapha (Saalmüller, 1891)
- Lithacodia triocellata Berio, 1964
- Lithacodia varioplagata Berio, 1954
- Lophoptera litigiosa (Boisduval, 1833)
- Lophoruza semiscripta (Mabille, 1893)
- Lophotavia incivilis Walker, 1865
- Mabilleana pudens (Mabille, 1900)
- Macella euritiusalis (Walker, 1859)
- Madathisanotia madagascariensis (Rothschild, 1924)
- Madecathymia cadoreli Viette, 1968
- Madegalatha malagassica (Hampson, 1909)
- Madegalatha occidentis Viette, 1968
- Madeuplexia altitudinis Viette, 1960
- Madeuplexia camusi Viette, 1967
- Madeuplexia pretiosa Viette, 1960
- Madeuplexia retorta (Berio, 1956)
- Madeuplexia sogai Viette, 1960
- Mageochaeta malgassica (Kenrick, 1917)
- Maghadena balachowskyi Viette, 1967
- Maghadena boby (Viette, 1960)
- Maghadena duberneti Viette, 1968
- Maghadena malagasy Viette, 1968
- Maghadena norma (Saalmüller, 1891)
- Maghadena radama Viette, 1963
- Maliattha commersoni Viette, 1965
- Maliattha lemur Viette, 1965
- Maliattha perrieri Viette, 1965
- Maliattha pratti Viette, 1965
- Maliattha sogai Viette, 1965
- Maliattha toulgoeti Viette, 1965
- Maliattha tsaratanana Viette, 1965
- Marathyssa cuneata (Saalmüller, 1891)
- Marca proclinata Saalmüller, 1891
- Marcipa callaxantha (Kenrick, 1917)
- Marcipa noel Viette, 1966
- Marcipa silvicola Viette, 1966
- Marcipopsis aureolimbata Berio, 1966
- Marcipopsis concinna Berio, 1966
- Marcipopsis pallidula (Saalmüller, 1891)
- Marcipopsis proxima Berio, 1966
- Marimatha coenogramma (Mabille, 1900)
- Marojala anophtalma (Viette, 1966)
- Marojala butleri (Viette, 1966)
- Marojala signata (Butler, 1880)
- Masalia epimethea (Viette, 1958)
- Masalia prochaskai (Viette, 1958)
- Matopo oberthueri (Viette, 1965)
- Matopo plurilineata Berio, 1956
- Matopo subarida (Viette, 1976)
- Maxera marchalii (Boisduval, 1833)
- Mecodinops anceps (Mabille, 1879)
- Megacephalomana rivulosum (Saalmüller, 1880)
- Megacephalomana saalmuelleri (Viette, 1965)
- Megacephalomana stygium (Saalmüller, 1881)
- Megalonycta mediovitta (Rothschild, 1924)
- Melanephia banian Viette, 1965
- Melanephia brunneiventris Berio, 1956
- Melapera rhodophora (Mabille, 1879)
- Melapera roastis Hampson, 1908
- Melipotis voeltzkowi (Viette, 1965)
- Mentaxya albifrons (Geyer, 1837)
- Mentaxya ignicollis (Walker, 1857)
- Mentaxya muscosa Geyer, 1837
- Mentaxya sexalata Viette, 1959
- Mentaxya trisellata Viette, 1959
- Metachrostis decora (Walker, 1869)
- Metappana crescentica (Hampson, 1910)
- Micardia argentoidea Berio, 1954
- Micardia ikoly Viette, 1982
- Micardia itremo Viette, 1982
- Micardia simplicissima Berio, 1973
- Micardia terracottoides Berio, 1954
- Microplexia albopicta (Saalmüller, 1891)
- Microplexia anosibe Berio, 1959
- Microplexia aurantiaca (Saalmüller, 1891)
- Microplexia bicoloria Berio, 1963
- Microplexia bicostata Berio, 1964
- Microplexia confusa Berio, 1963
- Microplexia discreta (Saalmüller, 1891)
- Microplexia elegans (Saalmüller, 1891)
- Microplexia extranea Berio, 1959
- Microplexia fenestrata Berio, 1963
- Microplexia ferrea Hampson, 1908
- Microplexia fracta Berio, 1956
- Microplexia griveaudi Berio, 1963
- Microplexia lithacodica Berio, 1964
- Microplexia metachrostoides Berio, 1959
- Microplexia muscosa (Saalmüller, 1891)
- Microplexia nephelea (Mabille, 1900)
- Microplexia parmelia (Toulgoët, 1954)
- Microplexia plurinephra Berio, 1959
- Microplexia transversata Berio, 1964
- Microplexia viridaria (Kenrick, 1917)
- Microplexia viridis Berio, 1963
- Miniophyllodes aurora de Joannis, 1912
- Miniophyllodes sikorai Viette, 1975
- Mocis conveniens (Walker, 1858)
- Mocis frugalis (Fabricius, 1775)
- Mocis mayeri (Boisduval, 1833)
- Mocis mutuaria (Walker, 1858)
- Mocis proverai Zilli, 2000
- Musurgina laeta Jordan, 1921
- Mydrodoxa sogai Viette, 1965
- Mydrodoxa splendens Butler, 1880
- Mythimna madensis Berio, 1956
- Mythimna umbrigera (Saalmüller, 1891)
- Naarda ivelona Viette, 1965
- Nagia linteola (Guenée, 1852)
- Nagia promota (Pagenstecher, 1907)
- Nagia vadoni Viette, 1968
- Neostichtis ignorata Viette, 1958
- Neostichtis inopinatus Viette, 1960
- Nodaria cornicalis (Fabricius, 1794)
- Nodaria turpalis Mabille, 1900
- Nyctennomos catalai (Viette, 1954)
- Nyctennomos decaryi (Viette, 1954)
- Nyctennomos descarpentriesi (Viette, 1954)
- Nyctennomos peratosema Hampson, 1926
- Nyctennomos ungulata Berio, 1956
- Nyodes ochrargyra Mabille, 1900
- Nyodes virescens (Butler, 1879)
- Ochropleura elevata Viette, 1959
- Ochropleura leucogaster (Freyer, 1831)
- Ochropleura marojejy Viette, 1961
- Ochropleura portieri Viette, 1967
- Odontestra malgassica Viette, 1969
- Oedebasis longipalpis (Berio, 1959)
- Oedebasis mutilata (Berio, 1966)
- Oedebasis regularis Viette, 1971
- Oglasa trimacula (Saalmüller, 1891)
- Ogovia ebenaui (Viette, 1965)
- Omphalestra herbuloti Viette, 1961
- Ophisma cuprizonea Hampson, 1913
- Ophiusa anomala (Berio, 1956)
- Ophiusa cancellata (Saalmüller, 1891)
- Ophiusa coronata (Fabricius, 1775)
- Ophiusa grandidieri (Viette, 1966)
- Ophiusa hopei (Boisduval, 1833)
- Ophiusa legendrei Viette, 1967
- Ophiusa mabillei (Viette, 1975)
- Ophiusa pelor (Mabille, 1881)
- Ophiusa reducta (Mabille, 1880)
- Ophiusa tirhaca (Cramer, 1777)
- Ophiusa waterlooti Viette, 1982
- Oraesia pierronii (Mabille, 1880)
- Oraesia triobliqua (Saalmüller, 1880)
- Oruza divisa (Walker, 1862)
- Ozarba abscissa (Walker, 1858)
- Ozarba corniculans (Wallengren, 1860)
- Ozarba cryptochrysea (Hampson, 1902)
- Ozarba exoplaga Berio, 1940
- Ozarba flavidiscata Hampson, 1910
- Ozarba griveaudae Viette, 1985
- Ozarba hemimelaena Hampson, 1910
- Ozarba lepida Saalmüller, 1891
- Ozarba marthae Berio, 1940
- Ozarba melagona Hampson, 1910
- Ozarba miary Viette, 1985
- Ozarba microcycla (Mabille, 1879)
- Ozarba micropunctata Berio, 1960
- Ozarba nephroleuca Hampson, 1910
- Ozarba nyanza (Felder & Rogenhofer, 1874)
- Ozarba paulianae Viette, 1985
- Ozarba perplexa Saalmüller, 1891
- Ozopteryx basalis Saalmüller, 1891
- Pandesma decaryi (Viette, 1966)
- Pangrapta argyrographa (Mabille, 1893)
- Pangrapta fauvealis Viette, 1965
- Pangrapta hampsoni Viette, 1966
- Pangrapta pexifera Hampson, 1926
- Paracaroides louveli Viette, 1969
- Paracaroides pratti Kenrick, 1917
- Paracaroides sublota (Mabille, 1900)
- Paracroria milloti Viette, 1969
- Parafodina andriai Viette, 1966
- Parafodina delphinensis (Viette, 1966)
- Parafodina inscripta (Pagenstecher, 1907)
- Parafodina pagenstecheri Viette, 1968
- Parafodina sambirano (Viette, 1966)
- Paralephana angulata (Viette, 1966)
- Paralephana catalai Viette, 1954
- Paralephana poliotis Hampson, 1926
- Paralephana purpurascens Hampson, 1926
- Paralephana salmonea Viette, 1966
- Paralephana subpurpurascens Viette, 1954
- Paralephana uniplagiata Viette, 1966
- Parangitia micrina Berio, 1966
- Pararothia camilla (Oberthür, 1923)
- Pararothia gracilis (Jordan, 1913)
- Pararothia vieui (Viette, 1966)
- Paratuerta laminifer (Saalmüller, 1878)
- Pemphigostola synemonistis Strand, 1909
- Pericyma mendax (Walker, 1858)
- Pericyma polygramma Hampson, 1913
- Pericyma viettei (Berio, 1955)
- Pericyma vinsonii (Guenée, 1862)
- Perigea meleagris (Saalmüller, 1891)
- Phoperigea variegata (Kenrick, 1917)
- Plecoptera fletcherana Viette, 1966
- Plusiodonta cobaltina Viette, 1956
- Plusiodonta gueneei (Viette, 1968)
- Plusiodonta ionochrota Hampson, 1926
- Plusiodonta malagasy (Viette, 1968)
- Plusiopalpa hildebrandti (Saalmüller, 1891)
- Plusiopalpa thaumasia Dufay, 1968
- Polydesma hildebrandti Viette, 1967
- Polydesma umbricola Boisduval, 1833
- Pristoceraea eriopis (Herrich-Schäffer, 1853)
- Progonia boisduvalalis Viette, 1961
- Progonia matilei Orhant, 2001
- Progonia oileusalis (Walker, 1859)
- Prominea jeanneli Viette, 1954
- Prominea porrecta (Saalmüller, 1880)
- Promionides obliqua Berio, 1966
- Protomeroleuca perlides Berio, 1966
- Prototrachea leucopicta (Kenrick, 1917)
- Pseudelaeodes proteoides (Kenrick, 1917)
- Pseudelaeodes sogai Viette, 1969
- Pseudotolna perineti Viette, 1965
- Radara helcida (Viette, 1962)
- Radara subcupralis (Walker, [1866])
- Radara vacillans Walker, 1862
- Raparna confusa Mabille, 1900
- Raparna didyma Mabille, 1900
- Remigiodes remigina (Mabille, 1884)
- Remigiodes turlini Viette, 1973
- Rhesala moestalis (Walker, 1866)
- Rhynchina deflexa (Saalmüller, 1891)
- Rhynchina herbuloti Viette, 1965
- Rhynchina leucodonta Hampson, 1910
- Rhynchina revolutalis (Zeller, 1852)
- Rivula sororcula (Saalmüller, 1891)
- Rothia agrius (Herrich-Schäffer, 1853)
- Rothia arrosa Jordan, 1926
- Rothia cruenta Jordan, 1913
- Rothia dayremi (Oberthür, 1909)
- Rothia distigma (Mabille, 1898)
- Rothia hampsoni Oberthür, 1916
- Rothia holli (Oberthür, 1909)
- Rothia hypopyrrha (Butler, 1878)
- Rothia lasti Rothschild, 1896
- Rothia metagrius (Butler, 1880)
- Rothia micropales Butler, 1879
- Rothia nigrescens Rothschild, 1896
- Rothia pales (Guérin-Méneville, 1832)
- Rothia pedasus (Herrich-Schäffer, 1853)
- Rothia powelli (Oberthür, 1909)
- Rothia rhaeo (Druce, 1894)
- Rothia simyra Westwood, 1877
- Rothia turlini Kiriakoff & Viette, 1973
- Rothia watersi (Butler, 1884)
- Rothia westwoodi Butler, 1879
- Rothia zea (Herrich-Schäffer, 1853)
- Rungsianea fontainei Viette, 1967
- Rungsianea hecate (Viette, 1960)
- Saalmuellerana glebosa (Saalmüller, 1891)
- Saalmuellerana illota Viette, 1973
- Saaluncifera uncinata (Saalmüller, 1891)
- Schausilla obryzos (Mabille, 1878)
- Sciatta delphinensis (Viette, 1966)
- Sciomesa betschi Viette, 1967
- Sciomesa biluma Nye, 1959
- Sciomesa janthina Viette, 1960
- Sciomesa oberthueri Viette, 1967
- Sculptifrontia arcuata Berio, 1966
- Selenisa affulgens (Saalmüller 1881)
- Selenistis laurentica Viette, 1969
- Serrodes trispila (Mabille, 1890)
- Sesamia calamistis Hampson, 1910
- Sesamia madagascariensis Saalmüller, 1891
- Sesamia simplaria Rungs, 1954
- Simplicia extinctalis (Zeller, 1852)
- Simplicia inflexalis Guenée, 1854
- Simplicia periplocalis (Mabille, 1880)
- Singara humberti Viette, 1966
- Spodoptera apertura (Walker, 1865)
- Spodoptera cilium Guenée, 1852
- Spodoptera exempta (Walker, 1857)
- Spodoptera littoralis (Boisduval, 1833)
- Spodoptera malagasy Viette, 1967
- Spodoptera mauritia (Boisduval, 1833)
- Staga producta Mabille, 1900
- Stenopterygia monostigma (Saalmüller, 1891)
- Stictoptera antemarginata Saalmüller, 1880
- Stictoptera poecilosoma Saalmüller, 1880
- Sypnoides delphinensis Viette, 1966
- Syrrusis milloti Viette, 1972
- Syrrusis monticola (Viette, 1960)
- Syrrusis notabilis (Butler, 1879)
- Syrrusis pictura (Saalmüller, 1891)
- Syrrusis vau (Berio, 1956)
- Tachosa malagasy Viette, 1966
- Tanocryx pseudobamra (Rothschild, 1924)
- Taraconica aurea Viette, 1968
- Taraconica berioi Viette, 1965
- Taraconica betsimisaraka Viette, 1965
- Taraconica humberti Viette, 1965
- Taraconica novogonia (Berio, 1956)
- Tathodelta undilinea (Hampson, 1926)
- Tathorhynchus homogyna Hampson, 1902
- Tathorhynchus nigra (Viette, 1954)
- Taveta eucosmia Hampson, 1926
- Tavia nycterina (Boisduval, 1833)
- Thausgea bekaka Viette, 1966
- Thausgea lolo Viette, 1966
- Thausgea lucifer Viette, 1966
- Thausgea sogai Viette, 1966
- Thermesia clarilinea Mabille, 1900
- Thermesia junctilinea Mabille, 1900
- Thiacidas alboporphyrea (Pagenstecher, 1907)
- Thyas minians (Mabille, 1884)
- Thyas parallelipipeda (Guenée, 1852)
- Thysanoplusia cupreomicans (Hampson, 1909)
- Thysanoplusia exquisita (Felder & Rogenhofer, 1874)
- Thysanoplusia indicator (Walker, [1858])
- Timora pauliani Viette, 1961
- Tolna complicata (Butler, 1880)
- Tolna sypnoides (Butler, 1878)
- Tracheplexia debilis (Butler, 1879)
- Trichoplusia florina (Guenée, 1852)
- Trichoplusia orichalcea (Fabricius, 1775)
- Trigonodes hyppasia (Cramer, 1779)
- Tunocaria rubiginosa Viette, 1961
- Ugia albooculata (Saalmüller, 1880)
- Ugia malagasy Viette, 1966
- Ugia navana Viette, 1966
- Ugia polysticta Hampson, 1926
- Ugia radama Viette, 1966
- Ulotrichopus ochreipennis (Butler, 1878)
- Vietteania pinna (Saalmüller, 1891)
- Vietteania torrentium (Guenée, 1852)
- Viettentia zethesoides (Viette, 1966)
- Vittaplusia vittata (Wallengren, 1856)
- Xanthomera leucoglene (Mabille, 1880)
- Xylostola punctum Berio, 1956
- Zacthys biplaga Viette, 1973
- Zalaca snelleni (Wallengren, 1875)
- Zethes humilis Mabille, 1900

== Nolidae ==
- Acripia megalesia Viette, 1965
- Blenina hyblaeoides Kenrick, 1917
- Bryophilopsis pullula (Saalmüller, 1891)
- Bryophilopsis tarachoides Mabille, 1900
- Bryophilopsis vadoni Viette, 1982
- Bryophilopsis xephiris Viette, 1976
- Decarynodes ankasoka Viette, 1961
- Earias biplaga Walker, 1866
- Earias insulana (Boisduval, 1833)
- Earias malagasy Viette, 1969
- Earias virgula Viette, 1969
- Elesmoides malagasy Viette, 1973
- Eligma malagassica Rothschild, 1896
- Evonima littoralis (van Son, 1933)
- Garella basalis Berio, 1966
- Gigantoceras perineti Viette, 1965
- Gigantoceras voeltzkowi Viette, 1965
- Iscadia viettei (Berio, 1955)
- Leocyma appollinis Guenée, 1852
- Leocyma vates Saalmüller, 1891
- Lophocrama phoenicochlora Hampson, 1912
- Lophocrama suavis (Saalmüller, 1891)
- Madanola fuscocandida Hacker, 2012
- Maurilia arcuata (Walker, [1858])
- Maurilia griveaudi Viette, 1982
- Maurilia malgassica Viette, 1965
- Maurilia makandro Viette, 1982
- Maurilia malgassica Viette, 1965
- Maurilia mandraka Viette, 1982
- Maurilia mikea Viette, 1982
- Meganola alteroscota Toulgoët,
- Meganola arcanalis Toulgoët, 1962
- Meganola bifuscatalis Toulgoët, 1982
- Meganola bilineatalis (Toulgoët, 1962)
- Meganola bryophiloides (Butler, 1882)
- Meganola convexalis (Toulgoët, 1961)
- Meganola costisquamosa (Toulgoët, 1954)
- Meganola cramboidalis Toulgoët, 1982
- Meganola decaryi (Toulgoët, 1955)
- Meganola dilutalis (Toulgoët, 1961)
- Meganola efflucta Hacker, 2012
- Meganola erythrinalis (Toulgoët, 1961)
- Meganola funebralis (Toulgoët, 1961)
- Meganola gibeauxi Toulgoët, 1982
- Meganola heteroscota (Toulgoët, 1954)
- Meganola incana (Saalmüller, 1884)
- Meganola incertalis Toulgoët, 1982
- Meganola inexpectalis (Toulgoët, 1962)
- Meganola infumatalis Toulgoët, 1982
- Meganola infuscatalis (Toulgoët, 1961)
- Meganola insolitalis Toulgoët, 1982
- Meganola integralis Toulgoët, 1982
- Meganola kenrickialis Hacker, 2012
- Meganola leucomelas (Toulgoët, 1954)
- Meganola malgassica (Kenrick, 1917)
- Meganola medialis (Toulgoët, 1961)
- Meganola mediofracta (Toulgoët, 1954)
- Meganola mediolinealis (Toulgoët, 1962)
- Meganola meloui Hacker, 2012
- Meganola millotalis (Toulgoët, 1965)
- Meganola modestalis (Toulgoët, 1961)
- Meganola nanula (Toulgoët, 1954)
- Meganola nigromixtalis (Toulgoët, 1961)
- Meganola nivatalis (Toulgoët, 1965)
- Meganola nudalis (Toulgoët, 1961)
- Meganola oleaginalis (Toulgoët, 1972)
- Meganola palpalis (Toulgoët, 1962)
- Meganola parafuscatalis Hacker, 2012
- Meganola paulianalis (Toulgoët, 1962)
- Meganola pictalis Toulgoët, 1982
- Meganola picturata (Mabille, 1899)
- Meganola polychroma (Toulgoët, 1956)
- Meganola praefica (Saalmüller, 1884)
- Meganola rubiginealis (Toulgoët, 1961)
- Meganola rufomixtalis (Toulgoët, 1962)
- Meganola saalmuelleri (Toulgoët, 1961)
- Meganola sogalis (Toulgoët, 1965)
- Meganola subfuscigera Hacker, 2012
- Meganola subpraefica Hacker, 2012
- Meganola tessellalis Toulgoët, 1982
- Meganola toulgoetiella Hacker, 2012
- Meganola varia (Saalmüller, 1884)
- Meganola venosalis (Toulgoët, 1954)
- Meganola venustula (Toulgoët, 1954)
- Meganola viettealis Toulgoët, 1982
- Meganola vieui (Toulgoët, 1962)
- Metaleptina andriavolo Viette, 1976
- Metaleptina sarice (Viette, 1981)
- Microzada amabilis (Saalmüller, 1891)
- Microzada similis Berio, 1956
- Negeta luminosa (Walker, 1858)
- Negeta argentula Viette, 1976
- Negeta franeyae Viette, 1987
- Nola biangulata (Toulgoët, 1954)
- Nola geminata (Mabille, 1900)
- Nola major Hampson, 1891
- Nola mineti Hacker, 2012
- Nola musculalis Saalmüller, 1880
- Nola obliquilinealis (Toulgoët, 1972)
- Nola rotundalis Toulgoët, 1982
- Nola socotrensis (Hampson, 1901)
- Nola squalida Staudinger, 1870
- Nola triangulalis (Toulgoët, 1962)
- Nolidia transitoria (van Son, 1933)
- Ophiosema viettei (Berio, 1956)
- Pardasena atripuncta Hampson, 1912
- Pardasena melanosticta Hampson, 1912
- Pardasena virgulana (Mabille, 1880)
- Pardoxia graellsii (Feisthamel, 1837)
- Plusiocalpe atlanta Viette, 1968
- Plusiocalpe micans (Saalmüller, 1891)
- Plusiocalpe pallida Holland, 1894
- Plusiocalpe sericina (Mabille, 1900)
- Risoba malagasy (Viette, 1965)
- Tornoconia artemis Viette, 1972
- Tornoconia mabillei Viette, 1972
- Tornoconia panda Viette, 1972
- Vandamia sertalis (Toulgoët, 1982)
- Westermannia brillans Viette, 1965
- Xanthodes albago (Fabricius, 1794)

== Notodontidae ==
- Acrasiodes io (Viette, 1954)
- Acroctena arguta Kiriakoff, 1969
- Acroctena fissura Saalmüller, 1884
- Acroctena lilacina (Kenrick, 1917)
- Acroctena nebulosa Kiriakoff, 1969
- Acroctena pallida (Butler, 1882)
- Ambina andranoma Kiriakoff, 1969
- Ambina dorsalis (Kiriakoff, 1960)
- Ambina insufficiens (Kiriakoff, 1960)
- Ambina kodamire (Viette, 1954)
- Ambina ochreopicta (Kenrick, 1917)
- Ambina ochribasis (Kiriakoff, 1960)
- Ambina septentrionalis Kiriakoff, 1969
- Ambina spissicornis (Mabille, 1900)
- Ambina trioculata Kiriakoff, 1969
- Analama conspicua Kiriakoff, 1960
- Analama obliquifascia (Kenrick, 1917)
- Analama perinetensis (Kiriakoff, 1958)
- Anaphe aurea Butler, 1892
- Anaphe stellata Guérin-Méneville, 1844
- Anaphe zombitsyana Viette, 1965
- Antheua haasi (Saalmüller, 1884)
- Antheua ornata (Walker, 1865)
- Antoroka munda Kiriakoff, 1969
- Antsalova jeannelianum (Viette, 1954)
- Antsalova musculus Kiriakoff, 1960
- Antsalova pauliani Kiriakoff, 1969
- Aprosdocetos descarpentrianum (Viette, 1954)
- Artanasa viettei Kiriakoff, 1960
- Atrasana brunneis Viette, 1954
- Atrasana malgassa (Viette, 1955)
- Dasychoproctis dubiosa Hering, 1926
- Desmeocraera antiopa Viette, 1954
- Desmeocraera miata Viette, 1955
- Desmeocraera robustior Kiriakoff, 1960
- Elaphrodes simplex (Viette, 1955)
- Epicerurina grisea Kiriakoff, 1969
- Eramos viridissima Kiriakoff, 1958
- Euanthia inexpecta Kiriakoff, 1969
- Eutrotonotus albidilinea Gaede, 1928
- Eutrotonotus ameles Kiriakoff, 1960
- Eutrotonotus basistriga Kiriakoff, 1960
- Eutrotonotus carignanus Kiriakoff, 1963
- Eutrotonotus catalai Kiriakoff, 1969
- Eutrotonotus margarethae Kiriakoff, 1960
- Eutrotonotus mediofascia Kiriakoff, 1960
- Eutrotonotus pratti (Kenrick, 1917)
- Eutrotonotus psilodoxa Viette, 1955
- Eutrotonotus rectilinea Kiriakoff, 1960
- Eutrotonotus subvinaceus Kiriakoff, 1960
- Eutrotonotus viettei Kiriakoff, 1960
- Eutrotonotus zeta Kiriakoff, 1960
- Exantongila antongilensis (Viette, 1955)
- Fanambana anomoeotina Kiriakoff & Viette, 1969
- Fanambana pyralidina Kiriakoff & Viette, 1969
- Griphocerura malgassica (Kenrick, 1917)
- Hypsoides ambrensis Poujade, 1903
- Hypsoides anosibeana (Oberthür, 1922)
- Hypsoides antsianakana (Oberthür, 1922)
- Hypsoides barrei (Mabille, 1891)
- Hypsoides befotakana Viette, 1965
- Hypsoides bipars Butler, 1882
- Hypsoides cleotis Swinhoe, 1907
- Hypsoides conglomerata (Oberthür, 1923)
- Hypsoides culminidentata (Oberthür, 1923)
- Hypsoides diego (Coquerel, 1855)
- Hypsoides flavens (Mabille, 1891)
- Hypsoides kiriakoffi Viette, 1965
- Hypsoides lambertoni (Oberthür, 1922)
- Hypsoides meloui (Oberthür, 1922)
- Hypsoides paulinus (Oberthür, 1923)
- Hypsoides placidus (Oberthür, 1923)
- Hypsoides radama (Coquerel, 1855)
- Hypsoides semifusca Kiriakoff, 1969
- Hypsoides singularis Kiriakoff, 1969
- Hypsoides timoleon (Oberthür, 1923)
- Iridoplitis malgassica Kiriakoff, 1960
- Italaviana griveaudi Kiriakoff, 1960
- Malgadonta idioptila (Bethune-Baker, 1916)
- Nesanaphe mirabilis (Viette, 1955)
- Nesanaphe zombitsyana (Viette, 1965)
- Nesochadisra protea Kiriakoff, 1969
- Nesoptilura malgassica Kiriakoff, 1960
- Notodonta angustipennis Mabille, 1881
- Ochrocalliope grandidierianum (Viette, 1954)
- Ochrocalliope mediobrunnea (Kiriakoff, 1960)
- Ochrocalliope sambava Kiriakoff, 1963
- Ochrosomera marojejia (Kiriakoff, 1963)
- Ochrosomera vanja Kiriakoff, 1969
- Omocerina viettei Kiriakoff, 1970
- Pachycispia picta Butler, 1882
- Paralerodes albosparsatus (Kenrick, 1914)
- Phalera grandidieranum (Viette, 1954)
- Pseudohypsoides bicolor Viette, 1960
- Pseudohypsoides unicolor Viette, 1960
- Pseudohypsoides vadoni Viette, 1960
- Rasemia descarpentrianum (Viette, 1954)
- Rhenea circumcincta (Saalmüller, 1880)
- Rhenea mediata (Walker, 1865)
- Rhynchophalerina inexpectata Kiriakoff, 1969
- Romaleostaura insularis Kiriakoff, 1960
- Schedostauropus elegans Kiriakoff, 1960
- Schedostauropus gemina (Gaede, 1928)
- Scrancia cadoreli Viette, 1972
- Scrancia ioptila (Viette, 1955)
- Scrancia tuleara Kiriakoff, 1963
- Tricholoba magnifica Viette, 1955
- Vietteella madagascariensis (Draeseke, 1937)
- Vietteella nigrilineata Kiriakoff, 1969
- Zelomera imitans Butler, 1882

== Oecophoridae ==
- Abychodes janineae Viette, 1954
- Ancylometis isophaula Meyrick, 1934
- Beforona mirabilella Viette, 1956
- Diocosma filinotella Viette, 1958
- Lasiomactra maisongrossella Viette, 1955
- Metachanda benoistella Viette, 1955
- Metachanda louvelella Viette, 1956
- Metachanda phalarodora Viette, 1955
- Metachanda rutenbergella Viette, 1956
- Orygocera ambavaella Viette, 1988
- Orygocera andilambella (Viette, 1985)
- Orygocera aurea (Viette, 1954)
- Orygocera befasyella Viette, 1988
- Orygocera dubiosella (Viette, 1987)
- Orygocera fosaella (Viette, 1958)
- Orygocera griveaudella (Viette, 1985)
- Orygocera indranoella (Viette, 1985)
- Orygocera lemuriella (Viette, 1958)
- Orygocera magdalena Meyrick, 1930
- Orygocera pauliani (Viette, 1949)
- Orygocera propygnota Meyrick, 1930
- Orygocera rungsella (Viette, 1956)
- Orygocera subnivea (Viette, 1954)
- Orygocera tricolorella (Viette, 1958)
- Orygocera vadonella (Viette, 1985)
- Plesiosticha practicodes (Meyrick, 1918)
- Pseudepiphractis ankaratrella Viette, 1956
- Pseudepiphractis bicolorella Viette, 1956
- Pseudepiphractis cosmiella Viette, 1956
- Pseudepiphractis facetella Viette, 1956
- Pseudepiphractis limonella Viette, 1956
- Pseudepiphractis zelosarella Viette, 1958
- Stathmopoda maisongrossiella Viette, 1954
- Stathmopoda vadoniella Viette, 1954
- Tanyzancla oberthurella Viette, 1956
- Tyriograptis elegantella Viette, 1955
- Tyriograptis isabella Viette, 1987
- Tyriograptis strepsaula Meyrick, 1934
- Tyromantis metaxantha Meyrick, 1918
- Xheroctys jeannelliella Viette, 1954

== Pantheidae ==
- Adaphaenura minuscula (Butler, 1882)
- Adaphaenura ratovosoni Viette, 1973
- Daphoenura fasciata Butler, 1878
- Epicausis smithii (Mabille, 1880)
- Epicausis vaovao Viette, 1973

== Plutellidae ==
- Iridostoma catatella Viette, 1956
- Plutella xylostella (Linnaeus, 1758)
- Tetanostola hexagona Meyrick, 1931

== Psychidae ==
- Acanthopsyche pauliani Bourgogne, 1984
- Conoeca psammogona (Meyrick, 1931)
- Deborrea cambouei (Oberthür, 1922)
- Deborrea griveaudi Bourgogne, 1982
- Deborrea humberti Bourgogne, 1984
- Deborrea malgassa Heylaerts, 1884
- Deborrea robinsoni Bourgogne, 1964
- Deborrea seyrigi Bourgogne, 1984
- Malgassopsyche viettei Bourgogne, 1984
- Narycia garrula Meyrick, 1934
- Obtexocorytus schuettei Sobczyk, 2009
- Oiketicus angulatus Gaede, 1929
- Oiketicus saclavus (Mabille, 1890)
- Sapheneutis pulchella Sobczyk & Schütte, 2010
- Typhonia alluaudiella (Viette, 1954)
- Typhonia bimaculata Sobczyk & Schütte, 2010
- Typhonia decaryella (Viette, 1955)
- Typhonia fibriculatella (Viette, 1956)
- Typhonia seyrigiella (Viette, 1954)
- Typhonia vadonella (Viette, 1955)

== Pterophoridae ==
- Adaina microdactyla (Hübner, 1813)
- Agdistis picardi Bigot, 1964
- Agdistis toliarensis Bigot, 1987
- Agdistopis griveaudi Gibeaux, 1994
- Amblyptilia incerta Gibeaux, 1994
- Amblyptilia viettei Gibeaux, 1994
- Bigotilia centralis (Bigot, 1964)
- Bigotilia montana Gibeaux, 1994
- Bipunctiphorus etiennei Gibeaux, 1994
- Buckleria madecassea Gibeaux, 1994
- Cnaemidophorus horribilis Gibeaux, 1996
- Crassuncus defectus (Bigot & Luquet, 1991)
- Crassuncus orophilus Gibeaux, 1994
- Crassuncus pseudolaudatus (Gibeaux, 1992)
- Eucapperia longiductus (Gibeaux, 1992)
- Exelastis atomosa (Walsingham, 1885)
- Exelastis crudipennis (Meyrick, 1932)
- Exelastis luqueti (Gibeaux, 1994)
- Exelastis phlyctaenias (Meyrick, 1911)
- Exelastis pilum Gielis, 2009
- Exelastis pumilio (Zeller, 1873)
- Hellinsia madecasseus (Bigot, 1964)
- Hellinsia mineti (Gibeaux, 1994)
- Helpaphorus boby Gibeaux, 1994
- Helpaphorus festivus (Bigot, 1964)
- Helpaphorus griveaudi (Bigot, 1964)
- Helpaphorus imaitso Gibeaux, 1994
- Helpaphorus testaceus Gibeaux, 1994
- Inferuncus nigreus Gibeaux, 1994
- Lantanophaga pusillidactylus (Walker, 1864)
- Leesi masoala Gibeaux, 1996
- Megalorhipida leptomeres (Meyrick, 1886)
- Megalorhipida leucodactylus (Fabricius, 1794)
- Megalorhipida prolai Gibeaux, 1994
- Megalorhipida tessmanni (Strand, 1913)
- Ochyrotica rufa Arenberger, 1987
- Paulianilus conyzae Gibeaux, 1994
- Picardia betsileo Gibeaux, 1994
- Picardia orchatias (Meyrick, 1908)
- Platyptilia farfarellus Zeller, 1867
- Platyptilia fulva Bigot, 1964
- Platyptilia grisea Gibeaux, 1994
- Platyptilia molopias Meyrick, 1906
- Platyptilia pauliani Gibeaux, 1994
- Platyptilia peyrierasi Gibeaux, 1994
- Platyptilia pseudofulva Gibeaux, 1994
- Platyptilia sogai Gibeaux, 1994
- Platyptilia violacea Gibeaux, 1994
- Pselnophorus ducis Gibeaux, 1994
- Pselnophorus laudatus Bigot, 1964
- Pterophorus albidus (Zeller, 1852)
- Pterophorus baliolus Bigot & Luquet, 1991
- Pterophorus ceraunia (Bigot, 1969)
- Pterophorus rhyparias (Meyrick, 1908)
- Setosipennula viettei Gibeaux, 1994
- Sphenarches anisodactylus (Walker, 1864)
- Sphenarches caffer (Zeller, 1852)
- Sphenarches cafferoides Gibeaux, 1996
- Stenodacma wahlbergi (Zeller, 1852)
- Stenoptilia viettei Gibeaux, 1994
- Stenoptilia zophodactylus (Duponchel, 1840)
- Stenoptilodes taprobanes (Felder & Rogenhofer, 1875)
- Titanoptilus rufus Gibeaux, 1994
- Vietteilus stenoptilioides Gibeaux, 1994
- Xyroptila irina Kovtunovich & Ustjuzhanin, 2006

== Pyralidae ==
- Acracona pratti (Kenrick, 1917)
- Aglossa humberti (Viette, 1973)
- Aglossa mineti Leraut, 2006
- Aglossa viettei Leraut, 2006
- Anexophana robinsonalis Viette, 1960
- Antisindris bipunctalis Marion, 1955
- Cactoblastis cactorum (Berg, 1885)
- Cadra cautella (Walker, 1863)
- Cadra rectivittella (Ragonot, 1901)
- Catalaodes analamalis (Viette, 1960)
- Catalaodes malgassicalis Viette, 1953
- Corcyra cephalonica (Stainton, 1866)
- Diloxia belohalis Marion & Viette, 1956
- Discordia sakarahalis Marion & Viette, 1956
- Discordia seyrigalis Marion & Viette, 1956
- Edulica rufalis Hampson, 1901
- Ectomyelois ceratoniae (Zeller, 1839)
- Ematheudes nigropunctata (Legrand, 1966)
- Embryoglossa submarginata (Kenrick, 1917)
- Endotricha consobrinalis Zeller, 1852
- Ephestia rectivitella Ragonot, 1901
- Ephestia subelutellum (Ragonot, 1901)
- Endotricha erythralis Mabille, 1900
- Epicrocis oegnusalis (Walker, 1859)
- Epicrocis signatella Pagenstecher, 1907
- Epicrocis umbratella Pagenstecher, 1907
- Epischnia beharella (Viette, 1964)
- Epischnia brevipalpella Ragonot, 1893
- Episindris albimaculalis Ragonot, 1891
- Essina callos (Viette, 1973)
- Etiella zinckenella (Treitschke, 1832)
- Euzophera decaryella (Marion & Viette, 1956)
- Euzophera sogai Roesler, 1981
- Euzophera villora (Felder & Rogenhofer, 1875)
- Gaana malagasella Viette, 1964
- Gaana malgachiella Roesler, 1982
- Gaana pseudomalazella Roesler, 1982
- Gaana pyrrhella Roesler, 1982
- Gaana viridella (Ragonot, 1888)
- Haplosindris leucotriangula (Mabille, 1900)
- Hypsopygia moramangalis (Marion & Viette, 1956)
- Hypotia diehlalis (Viette, 1953)
- Hypotia secundalis Leraut, 2006
- Hypotia seyrigalis (Viette, 1953)
- Hypsopygia mauritialis (Boisduval, 1833)
- Jakuarte martinalis Viette, 1953
- Lamoria clathrella (Ragonot, 1888)
- Lamoria imbella (Walker, 1864)
- Lepipaschia inornata Shaffer & Solis, 1994
- Lophocera flavifusalis Marion & Viette, 1956
- Lophocera flavipuncta Kenrick, 1917
- Lophocera vadonalis Marion & Viette, 1956
- Loryma ambovombealis Leraut, 2009
- Loryma athalialis (Walker, 1859)
- Loryma basalis (Walker, 1866)
- Loryma callos (Viette, 1973)
- Loryma gigantalis (Viette, 1960)
- Loryma itremoalis Leraut, 2009
- Loryma masamalis Leraut, 2009
- Loryma radamalis (Ragonot, 1891)
- Lygropia ochracealis (Saalmüller, 1880)
- Macalla madegassalis Viette, 1960
- Macalla seyrigalis Marion & Viette, 1956
- Mahela saalmulleri Ragonot, 1888
- Malgachinsula anosibeella Roesler, 1982
- Malgachinsula maisongrossalis (Viette, 1953)
- Malgachinsula tsarafidyella Roesler, 1982
- Malgachinsula viettei Roesler, 1982
- Maliarpha separatella (Ragonot, 1888)
- Marionana paulianalis Viette, 1953
- Marionana vinolentalis Viette, 1960
- Morosaphycita morosalis (Saalmüller, 1880)
- Metoecis carnifex (Coquerel, 1855)
- Neopaschia lemairei Viette, 1973
- Neopaschia nigromarginata Viette, 1953
- Nhoabe marionalis Leraut, 2006
- Nhoabe millotalis Viette, 1953
- Nhoabe minetalis Leraut, 2006
- Nhoabe mocquerysalis Viette, 1953
- Nhoabe privatalis Viette, 1960
- Nhoabe ratovosonalis Leraut, 2006
- Nhoabe sambiranoalis Leraut, 2006
- Nhoabe viettealis (Marion, 1955)
- Omphalepia dujardini Viette, 1967
- Paractenia pronubalis Marion & Viette, 1956
- Paroxyptera filiella (Saalmüller, 1880)
- Pempelia funebrella (Ragonot, 1893)
- Pempelia malgassicella (Marion & Viette, 1956)
- Pempelia multicolorella (Ragonot, 1893)
- Perinetoides anosibalis (Viette, 1960)
- Perinetoides ferruginea (Viette, 1966)
- Perinetoides margaritalis Marion, 1955
- Perula ambahonalis Marion & Viette, 1956
- Perula ankaratralis Marion & Viette, 1956
- Perula asopialis Mabille, 1900
- Perula occidentalis Viette, 1960
- Peucela bourgini Viette, 1951
- Phylebria paulianella (Marion & Viette, 1956)
- Polyocha flagrantella Ragonot, 1901
- Polyocha sanguinariella (Zeller, 1848)
- Prosaris hepaticalis Marion, 1955
- Prosaris percuprealis Marion, 1955
- Pseudopiesmopoda malgassicola Roesler, 1982
- Pyralis manihotalis Guenée, 1854
- Rhodophaea semiustella Hampson, 1901
- Saborma vicina (Saalmüller, 1880)
- Sacada madegassalis Viette, 1960
- Salma lakasy (Viette, 1981)
- Salma vadoni (Viette, 1981)
- Saluria furvella (Ragonot, 1888)
- Selagiaforma sandrangatoella Roesler, 1982
- Sindris albimaculalis (Ragonot, 1891)
- Sindris boisduvalalis Viette, 1953
- Sindris catalalis Viette, 1953
- Sindris leucomelas Kenrick, 1917
- Sindris minutalis Viette, 1960
- Sindris boisduvalalis Viette, 1953
- Sindris catalalis Viette, 1953
- Sindris sganzini Boisduval, 1833
- Spatulipalpia ambahonella Viette, 1964
- Stemmatophora malgassalis (Saalmüller, 1880)
- Synaphe bradleyalis (Viette, 1960)
- Tegulifera catalalis Marion & Viette, 1956
- Tegulifera tristiculalis Saalmüller, 1880
- Teliphasa andrianalis Viette, 1960
- Thylacoptila paurosema Meyrick, 1885
- Tsaraphycis philippella Viette, 1970
- Tsaratanana colorella Roesler, 1982
- Yxygodes bekilalis (Marion, 1954)
- Yxygodes insignis (Mabille, 1900)
- Yxygodes mademalis (Viette, 1978)
- Yxygodes meranalis (Viette, 1960)
- Yxygodes olapalis (Viette, 1978)
- Yxygodes seyrigalis (Marion, 1954)
- Yxygodes vieualis (Viette, 1960)
- Yxygodes xyridotalis (Viette, 1960)
- Yxygodes zonalis (Mabille, 1900)
- Zitha absconsalis Leraut, 2011
- Zitha adjunctalis Leraut, 2007
- Zitha agnielealis Leraut, 2011
- Zitha albostrigalis Saalmüller, 1880
- Zitha alticolalis Leraut, 2011
- Zitha ambatosoratralis Leraut, 2008
- Zitha ambinanitalis (Viette, 1960)
- Zitha ambodirianalis Leraut, 2011
- Zitha ambralis Leraut, 2011
- Zitha ankafinalis Leraut, 2007
- Zitha ankasokalis (Viette, 1960)
- Zitha anneliese (Viette, 1981)
- Zitha barbutalis Leraut, 2008
- Zitha belalonalis Leraut, 2011
- Zitha betsakotsakoalis Leraut, 2011
- Zitha bombycalis Leraut, 2007
- Zitha capuronalis (Viette, 1960)
- Zitha catochrysalis (Ragonot, 1891)
- Zitha cyanealis (Mabille, 1879)
- Zitha decrepis (Viette, 1989)
- Zitha deuvealis Leraut, 2009
- Zitha didyalis Leraut, 2008
- Zitha gallienalis Viette, 1960
- Zitha geometralis Leraut, 2007
- Zitha gueneealis Leraut, 2011
- Zitha herbulotalis (Marion, 1954)
- Zitha hiarakalis Leraut, 2011
- Zitha hongalis Leraut, 2011
- Zitha joannisalis Leraut, 2008
- Zitha lalannealis Leraut, 2009
- Zitha lanitralis Viette, 1978
- Zitha legrandalis Leraut, 2009
- Zitha lignosalis (Viette, 1960)
- Zitha luquetalis Leraut, 2011
- Zitha maesalis Leraut, 2007
- Zitha mangindranoalis Leraut, 2008
- Zitha mantasoalis Leraut, 2011
- Zitha marionalis (Viette, 1960)
- Zitha martinealis Leraut, 2011
- Zitha matsaboryalis Leraut, 2011
- Zitha millotalis Viette, 1960
- Zitha minetalis Leraut, 2008
- Zitha mixtalis Leraut, 2011
- Zitha montreuilalis Leraut, 2009
- Zitha munroealis Leraut, 2008
- Zitha navattealis Leraut, 2008
- Zitha noctualis Leraut, 2007
- Zitha nosivolalis (Viette, 1960)
- Zitha novembralis Leraut, 2009
- Zitha nussalis Leraut, 2011
- Zitha oecophoralis Leraut, 2007
- Zitha panemerialis Leraut, 2007
- Zitha pernalis (Viette, 1960)
- Zitha pronubalis (Marion & Viette, 1956)
- Zitha pyraustalis Leraut, 2007
- Zitha radamalis (Viette, 1960)
- Zitha ragonotalis (Viette, 1960)
- Zitha ranaivosoloalis Leraut, 2011
- Zitha rosalinde Viette, 1981
- Zitha rubicundalis Saalmüller, 1880
- Zitha sahafaryalis Leraut, 2011
- Zitha sakavondroalis Leraut, 2008
- Zitha sambavalis Leraut, 2009
- Zitha sanguinalis (Marion, 1954)
- Zitha saturninalis Leraut, 2011
- Zitha secundalis Leraut, 2008
- Zitha sogalis (Viette, 1960)
- Zitha sublignosalis Leraut, 2011
- Zitha subradamalis Leraut, 2011
- Zitha subvinosalis Leraut, 2011
- Zitha tertialis Leraut, 2008
- Zitha tortricoidalis Leraut, 2007
- Zitha toulgoetalis Leraut, 2009
- Zitha touretalbyalis Leraut, 2008
- Zitha tsarafidyalis Leraut, 2011
- Zitha tsaratananalis Leraut, 2011
- Zitha viettealis Leraut, 2009
- Zitha vieualis Leraut, 2011
- Zitha vincentalis Leraut, 2009
- Zitha vinosalis Leraut, 2011
- Zitha whalleyalis (Viette, 1960)
- Zitha zombitsalis 'Viette, 1960)

== Saturniidae ==
- Antherina suraka (Boisduval, 1833)
- Asthenia flavicapilla Mabille, 1880
- Argema mittrei (Guérin-Méneville, 1847)
- Bunaea alcinoe (Stoll, 1780)
- Bunaea aslauga Kirby, 1877
- Bunaea vulpes Oberthür, 1916
- Ceranchia apollina Butler, 1878
- Maltagorea altivola Basquin, 2013
- Maltagorea ambahona Basquin, 2013
- Maltagorea andriai (Griveaud, 1962)
- Maltagorea ankaratra (Viette, 1954)
- Maltagorea auricolor (Mabille, 1879)
- Maltagorea basquini Rougerie, 2003
- Maltagorea cincta (Mabille, 1879)
- Maltagorea dentata (Griveaud, 1962)
- Maltagorea dubiefi Bouyer, 2006
- Maltagorea dura (Keferstein, 1870)
- Maltagorea fusicolor (Mabille, 1879)
- Maltagorea griveaudi Bouyer, 1996
- Maltagorea madagascariensis (Sonthonnax, 1901)
- Maltagorea monsarrati (Griveaud, 1968)
- Maltagorea ornata (Griveaud, 1962)
- Maltagorea pseudomariae Basquin, 2013
- Maltagorea pseudovulpina Basquin & Rougerie, 2009
- Maltagorea rostaingi (Griveaud, 1962)
- Maltagorea rubriflava (Griveaud, 1962)
- Maltagorea sogai (Griveaud, 1962)
- Maltagorea vulpina (Butler, 1880)
- Nudaurelia eblis Strecker, 1876
- Tagoropsis lambertoni (Bouvier, 1927)

== Scyrthrididae ==
- Eretmocera fuscipennis Zeller, 1852
- Eretmocera laetissima Zeller, 1852
- Haploscythris chloraema (Meyrick, 1887)
- Scythris autochlorella Viette, 19560
- Scythris schouteni Bengtsson, 2014

== Sesiidae ==
- Agriomelissa malagasy Viette, 1982
- Camaegeria lychnitis Bartsch & Berg, 2012
- Camaegeria polytelis Bartsch & Berg, 2012
- Camaegeria sylvestralis (Viette, 1955)
- Camaegeria viettei Bartsch & Berg, 2012
- Camaegeria xanthomos Bartsch & Berg, 2012
- Camaegeria xanthopimplaeformis (Viette, 1956)
- Chamaesphecia andrianony Viette, 1982
- Chamaesphecia lemur Le Cerf, 1957
- Chamaesphecia seyrigi Le Cerf, 1957
- Hovaesia donckieri (Le Cerf, 1912)
- Lenyrhova heckmanniae (Aurivillius, 1909)
- Madasphecia griveaudi Viette, 1982
- Madasphecia puera Viette, 1957
- Malgassesia ankaratralis Viette, 1957
- Malgassesia biedermanni Viette, 1982
- Malgassesia milloti Viette, 1982
- Malgassesia pauliani Viette, 1955
- Malgasesia rufescens Le Cerf, 1922
- Malgasesia rufithorax (Le Cerf, 1922)
- Malgassesia seyrigi Viette, 1955
- Melittosesia flavitarsa Bartsch, 2009
- Microsynanthedon ambrensis Viette, 1955
- Microsynanthedon setodiformis (Mabille, 1892)
- Microsynanthedon tanala Minet, 1976
- Rodolphia hombergi Le Cerf, 1911
- Similipepsis eumenidiformis Bartsch, 2008
- Similipepsis maromizaensis Bartsch, 2008
- Tipulamima grandidieri (Le Cerf, 1917)
- Tipulamima ivondro Viette, 1966
- Tipulamima opalimargo (Le Cerf, 1913)
- Tipulamima seyrigi Viette, 1955

== Sphingidae ==
- Acherontia atropos (Linnaeus, 1758)
- Agrius convolvuli (Linnaeus, 1758)
- Antinephele lunulata Rothschild & Jordan, 1903
- Atemnora westermannii (Boisduval, 1875)
- Basiothia charis (Boisduval, 1847)
- Basiothia laticornis (Butler, 1879)
- Basiothia medea (Fabricius, 1781)
- Batocnema cocquerelii (Boisduval, 1875)
- Cephonodes apus (Boisduval, 1833)
- Cephonodes hylas (Linnaeus, 1771)
- Cephonodes leucogaster Rothschild & Jordan, 1903
- Cephonodes rufescens Griveaud, 1960
- Ceridia nigricans Griveaud, 1959
- Coelonia brevis Rothschild & Jordan, 1915
- Coelonia fulvinotata (Butler, 1875)
- Coelonia solani (Boisduval, 1833)
- Daphnis nerii (Linnaeus, 1758)
- Daphnis kitchingi (Haxaire & Melichar, 2011)
- Dargeclanis grandidieri (Mabille, 1879)
- Euchloron megaera (Linnaeus, 1758)
- Gynoeryx bilineatus (Griveaud, 1959)
- Gynoeryx brevis (Oberthür, 1909)
- Gynoeryx integer (Viette, 1956)
- Gynoeryx meander (Boisduval, 1875)
- Gynoeryx paulianii (Viette, 1956)
- Gynoeryx teteforti (Griveaud, 1964)
- Hippotion aurora Rothschild & Jordan, 1903
- Hippotion balsaminae (Walker, 1856)
- Hippotion batschii (Keferstein, 1870)
- Hippotion butleri (Saalmüller, 1884)
- Hippotion celerio (Linnaeus, 1758)
- Hippotion eson (Cramer, 1779)
- Hippotion geryon (Boisduval, 1875)
- Hippotion griveaudi Carcasson, 1968
- Hippotion melichari Haxaire, 2001
- Hippotion osiris (Dalman, 1823)
- Hippotion saclavorum (Boisduval, 1833)
- Hyles biguttata (Walker, 1856)
- Hyles livornica (Esper, 1780)
- Lomocyma oegrapha (Mabille, 1884)
- Maassenia distincta Gehlen, 1934
- Maassenia heydeni (Saalmüller, 1878)
- Macroglossum aesalon Mabille, 1879
- Macroglossum bombus Mabille, 1880
- Macroglossum gyrans Walker, 1856
- Macroglossum pachycerus Rothschild & Jordan, 1903
- Malgassoclanis delicatus (Jordan, 1921)
- Malgassoclanis suffuscus (Griveaud, 1959)
- Nephele accentifera (Palisot de Beauvois, 1821)
- Nephele comma Hopffer, 1857
- Nephele densoi (Keferstein, 1870)
- Nephele oenopion (Hübner, [1824])
- Panogena jasmini (Boisduval, 1875)
- Panogena lingens (Butler, 1877)
- Polyptychus paulianii Viette, 1956
- Pseudoclanis postica (Walker, 1856)
- Rhagastis lambertoni (Clark, 1923)
- Sphingonaepiopsis malgassica (Clark, 1929)
- Sphingonaepiopsis obscurus (Mabille, 1880)
- Temnora argyropeza (Mabille, 1879)
- Temnora engis Jordan, 1933
- Temnora fumosa (Walker, 1856)
- Temnora grandidieri (Butler, 1879)
- Temnora leighi Rothschild & Jordan, 1915
- Temnora nitida Jordan, 1920
- Temnora palpalis Rothschild & Jordan, 1903
- Temnora peckoveri (Butler, 1876)
- Temnoripais lasti (Rothschild, 1894)
- Theretra orpheus (Herrich-Schäffer, 1854)
- Xanthopan morganii (Walker, 1856)
- Xylophanes thyelia (Linnaeus, 1758)

== Stathmopodidae ==
- Phytophlops nigricella Viette, 1958
- Stathmopoda clarkei Viette, 1951
- Stathmopoda maisongrossiella Viette, 1954
- Stathmopoda vadoniella Viette, 1954

== Thyrididae ==
- Banisia antiopa (Viette, 1954)
- Banisia myrsusalis (Walker, 1859)
- Chrysotypus animula (Viette, 1957)
- Chrysotypus caryophyllae Frappa, 1954
- Chrysotypus cupreus Kenrick, 1914
- Chrysotypus dives Butler, 1879
- Chrysotypus enigmaticus Whalley, 1977
- Chrysotypus lakato Viette, 1958
- Chrysotypus locuples (Mabille, 1879)
- Chrysotypus maculatus Viette, 1960
- Chrysotypus perineti Viette, 1957
- Chrysotypus phoebus Viette, 1960
- Cornuterus trivius (Whalley, 1967)
- Hapana milloti (Viette, 1954)
- Opula chopardi (Viette, 1954)
- Opula lineata Whalley, 1967
- Rhodoneura elegantula Viette, 1957
- Rhodoneura limatula Whalley, 1967
- Rhodoneura marojejy Viette, 1960
- Rhodoneura mellea (Saalmüller, 1881)
- Rhodoneura opalinula (Mabille, 1879)
- Rhodoneura seyrigi (Viette, 1957)
- Rhodoneura strix Viette, 1958
- Rhodoneura superba (Viette, 1954)
- Rhodoneura terreola (Mabille, 1880)
- Rhodoneura translucida Viette, 1954
- Rhodoneura viettealis Whalley, 1977
- Rhodoneura werneburgalis (Keferstein, 1870)
- Rhodoneura zophocrana Viette, 1957
- Rhodoneura zurisana Whalley, 1971
- Striglina minutula (Saalmüller, 1880)
- Symphleps seta (Viette, 1958)
- Whalleyana toni Viette, 1977
- Whalleyana vroni Viette, 1977

== Tineidae ==
- Amphixystis anchiala (Meyrick, 1909)
- Amphixystis antongilella (Viette, 1955)
- Amphixystis aromaticella (Viette, 1957)
- Amphixystis herbulotella (Viette, 1955)
- Ancystrocheira porphyrica Gozmány, 1969
- Callocosmeta eupicta Gozmány, 1969
- Ceratophaga vastellus (Zeller, 1852)
- Chrysocrata coruscans Gozmány, 1969
- Cimitra horridella (Walker, 1863)
- Euagophleps brunneis Viette, 1952
- Euagophleps lambomakandro Viette, 1952
- Hapsifera nigraureella Viette, 1968
- Harmaclona berberea Bradley, 1956
- Harmaclona natalensis Bradley, 1953
- Hilaroptera viettei Gozmány, 1969
- Monachoptilas berista Viette, 1954
- Monachoptilas faedellus (Mabille, 1880)
- Monachoptilas hyperaesthetica Meyrick, 1934
- Monachoptilas musicodora Meyrick, 1934
- Monachoptilas paulianella Viette, 1955
- Monachoptilas petitiella Viette, 1954
- Monachoptilas stempfferiella Viette, 1954
- Morophaga vadonella (Viette, 1955)
- Opogona masoalella (Viette, 1955)
- Opogona omoscopa (Meyrick, 1893)
- Opogona sacchari (Bojer, 1856)
- Opogona sogaella Viette, 1985
- Perissomastix madagascarica Gozmány, 1969
- Perissomastix pauliani Gozmány, 1970
- Protagophleps masoala Viette, 1954
- Protaphreutis acquisitella (Walker, 1863)
- Protaphreutis borboniella (Boisduval, 1833)
- Ranohira silvestris Viette, 1952
- Scalmatica insularis Gozmány, 1969
- Sphallestasis cheligera Gozmány, 1970
- Tinea malgassica Gozmány, 1970
- Tineola atricoma Meyrick, 1931

== Tischeriidae ==
- Coptotriche alavelona Lees & Stonis, 2007

== Tortricidae ==
- Acantheucosma trachyptila Diakonoff, 1988
- Acanthoclita pectinata (Diakonoff, 1988)
- Acleris malagassana Diakonoff, 1973
- Acleris phanerocrypta Diakonoff, 1973
- Acroclita pertracta Diakonoff, 1989
- Adoxophyes perangusta Diakonoff, 1960
- Adoxophyes peritoma Meyrick, 1918
- Adoxophyes telestica Meyrick, 1930
- Aemulatrix notognatha Diakonoff, 1988
- Anthophrys spectabilis Diakonoff, 1960
- Apotoforma cimelia Diakonoff, 1960
- Astronauta astrogenes (Meyrick, 1934)
- Astronauta stellans (Meyrick, 1922)
- Aterpia microchlamys (Diakonoff, 1983)
- Bactra adelographa Diakonoff, 1983
- Bactra ametra Diakonoff, 1983
- Bactra bactrana (Kennel, 1901)
- Bactra distinctana Mabille, 1900
- Bactra dolia Diakonoff, 1963
- Bactra nesiotis Diakonoff, 1963
- Bactra punctistrigana Mabille, 1900
- Bactra pythonia Meyrick, 1909
- Bactra sinassula Diakonoff, 1963
- Bactra stagnicolana Zeller, 1852
- Bactra triceps Diakonoff, 1963
- Bactrostoma cinis Diakonoff, 1960
- Balioxena iospila Meyrick, 1912
- Bascaneucosma magicopa Diakonoff, 1989
- Basigonia anisocia Diakonoff, 1983
- Brachyvalva inoffensa Diakonoff, 1960
- Bucephalacra duplex (Diakonoff, 1981)
- Bucephalacra scoliosema Diakonoff, 1970
- Celypha perfracta Diakonoff, 1983
- Charitostega poliocycla Diakonoff, 1988
- Chloanohieris comastes Diakonoff, 1989
- Clepsis unifasciana (Duponchel, 1843)
- Cnephasia imitans Diakonoff, 1948
- Cochylis unicolorana Mabille, 1900
- Coniostola omistus Diakonoff, 1988
- Cornusaccula periopa Diakonoff, 1960
- Cosmetra rythmosema Diakonoff, 1992
- Cosmiophrys chrysobola Diakonoff, 1970
- Cosmiophrys stigma Diakonoff, 1960
- Cosmopoda aenopus Diakonoff, 1981
- Cosmopoda molybdopa Diakonoff, 1981
- Cosmorrhyncha ocellata (Mabille, 1900)
- Crocidosema bostrychodes Diakonoff, 1992
- Crocidosema plebejana Zeller, 1847
- Cryptaspasma subtilis Diakonoff, 1959
- Cryptophlebia notopeta Diakonoff, 1988
- Cryptophlebia peltastica (Meyrick, 1921)
- Cryptophlebia semilunana (Saalmüller, 1880)
- Cryptophlebia williamsi Bradley, 1953
- Cryptoschesis imitans Diakonoff, 1988
- Cuspidata anthracitis Diakonoff, 1960
- Cuspidata bidens Diakonoff, 1960
- Cuspidata castanea Diakonoff, 1960
- Cuspidata ditoma Diakonoff, 1960
- Cuspidata hypomelas Diakonoff, 1960
- Cuspidata leptozona Diakonoff, 1960
- Cuspidata micaria Diakonoff, 1973
- Cuspidata obscura Diakonoff, 1970
- Cuspidata oligosperma Diakonoff, 1960
- Cuspidata viettei Diakonoff, 1960
- Cydia aphrosema Diakonoff, 1987
- Cydia dochmasima Diakonoff, 1987
- Cydia pomonella (Linnaeus, 1758)
- Cydia serratula (Diakonoff, 1947)
- Cydia trichota Diakonoff, 1988
- Dasybregma gypsodoxa Diakonoff, 1983
- Diactora oxymorpha Diakonoff, 1960
- Digitosa elliptica Diakonoff, 1960
- Digitosa gnesia Diakonoff, 1960
- Digitosa leptographa Diakonoff, 1960
- Digitosa metaxantha Diakonoff, 1960
- Digitosa stenographa Diakonoff, 1970
- Digitosa vulpina Diakonoff, 1960
- Dolichohedya tripila Diakonoff, 1970
- Doridostoma denotata Diakonoff, 1973
- Doridostoma stenomorpha Diakonoff, 1973
- Dracontogena niphadonta Diakonoff, 1970
- Dudua adocima Diakonoff, 1981
- Dudua hemitypa Diakonoff, 1983
- Eboda bryochlora Diakonoff, 1960
- Ebodina lithoptila (Diakonoff, 1960)
- Eccopsis incultana (Walker, 1863)
- Eccopsis praecedens Walsingham, 1897
- Eccopsis wahlbergiana Zeller, 1852
- Epichorista sicca Meyrick, 1912
- Epichoristodes acerbella (Walker, 1864)
- Epichoristodes apiletica Diakonoff, 1960
- Epichoristodes atricaput Diakonoff, 1973
- Epichoristodes canonicum Diakonoff, 1973
- Epichoristodes goniopa Diakonoff, 1960
- Epichoristodes incerta Diakonoff, 1960
- Epichoristodes leucocymba (Meyrick, 1912)
- Epichoristodes macrosema Diakonoff, 1970
- Epichoristodes ypsilon Diakonoff, 1960
- Epinotia atacta Diakonoff, 1992
- Epinotia bricelus Diakonoff, 1992
- Epinotia dorsifraga Diakonoff, 1970
- Epinotia mniara Diakonoff, 1992
- Epinotia phyloeorrhages Diakonoff, 1970
- Epinotia selenana (Mabille, 1900)
- Epinotia xyloryctoides Diakonoff, 1992
- Episimus selenosema Diakonoff, 1963
- Eucosma bactromorpha Diakonoff, 1992
- Eucosmocydia oedipus Diakonoff, 1988
- Eudemis polychroma Diakonoff, 1981
- Fulcrifera cirrata Diakonoff, 1987
- Furcinula perizoma Diakonoff, 1960
- Furcinula punctulata Diakonoff, 1960
- Gephyraspis contranota Diakonoff, 1973
- Gephyraspis insolita Diakonoff, 1973
- Gephyraspis lutescens Diakonoff, 1960
- Goniotorna angusta Diakonoff, 1960
- Goniotorna chersopis Meyrick, 1933
- Goniotorna chondrocentra Diakonoff, 1973
- Goniotorna decipiens Diakonoff, 1960
- Goniotorna deinozona Diakonoff, 1973
- Goniotorna erratica (Diakonoff, 1947)
- Goniotorna heteropa Diakonoff, 1960
- Goniotorna iecoricolor Diakonoff, 1960
- Goniotorna illustra Diakonoff, 1960
- Goniotorna insatiata Diakonoff, 1973
- Goniotorna irresoluta Diakonoff, 1960
- Goniotorna lacrimosa Diakonoff, 1960
- Goniotorna leucophrys Diakonoff, 1960
- Goniotorna macula Diakonoff, 1970
- Goniotorna megalogonia Diakonoff, 1960
- Goniotorna melanoconis Diakonoff, 1960
- Goniotorna mesostena Diakonoff, 1963
- Goniotorna mianta Diakonoff, 1973
- Goniotorna micrognatha Diakonoff, 1960
- Goniotorna mucida Diakonoff, 1960
- Goniotorna niphotoma Diakonoff, 1960
- Goniotorna polyops Diakonoff, 1960
- Goniotorna praeornata Diakonoff, 1960
- Goniotorna praerupta Diakonoff, 1960
- Goniotorna rhodolemma Diakonoff, 1960
- Goniotorna rhodoptila Diakonoff, 1960
- Goniotorna suspiciosa Diakonoff, 1960
- Goniotorna synastra (Meyrick, 1918)
- Goniotorna trignoma Diakonoff, 1973
- Goniotorna trigodes Diakonoff, 1973
- Goniotorna vadoni Diakonoff, 1960
- Goniotorna verticillata Diakonoff, 1960
- Goniotorna vinacea Diakonoff, 1960
- Goniotorna vulpicolor Diakonoff, 1960
- Grapholita arcia Diakonoff, 1988
- Grapholita atrana (Mabille, 1900)
- Gypsonoma penthetria Diakonoff, 1992
- Hilaroptila mimetica Diakonoff, 1970
- Homona saclava (Mabille, 1900)
- Homonoides euryplaca (Meyrick, 1933)
- Hopliteccopsis amemorpha Diakonoff, 1963
- Hopliteccopsis crocostoma Diakonoff, 1992
- Hyposarotis atyphopa Diakonoff, 1988
- Hyposarotis impudica Diakonoff, 1988
- Idiothauma malgassicella Viette, 1958
- Labidosa sogai Diakonoff, 1960
- Leguminivora anthracotis (Meyrick, 1913)
- Leguminivora glycinivorella (Matsumura, 1898)
- Lobesia aeolopa Meyrick, 1907
- Lobesia archaetypa Diakonoff, 1992
- Lobesia harmonia (Meyrick, 1908)
- Lobesia leucospilana (Mabille, 1900)
- Lobesia semosa Diakonoff, 1992
- Lobesia vanillana (de Joannis, 1900)
- Lobesia vittigera (Meyrick, 1932)
- Lobesia xenosema Diakonoff, 1983
- Megalomacha tigripes Diakonoff, 1960
- Megalota antefracta Diakonoff, 1981
- Mesocharis centrifuga Diakonoff, 1981
- Mesotes pectinata Diakonoff, 1988
- Mesotes psymythistes Diakonoff, 1988
- Metamesia ametria Diakonoff, 1960
- Metamesia dilucida Diakonoff, 1960
- Metamesia episema Diakonoff, 1960
- Metamesia leptodelta Diakonoff, 1973
- Metamesia leucomitra Diakonoff, 1960
- Metamesia leucophyes Diakonoff, 1960
- Metamesia metacroca Diakonoff, 1960
- Metamesia nolens Diakonoff, 1960
- Metamesia peracuta Diakonoff, 1960
- Metamesia phanerops Diakonoff, 1960
- Metamesia ptychophora Diakonoff, 1960
- Metamesia retrocitra Diakonoff, 1960
- Metamesia synclysa Diakonoff, 1973
- Metendothenia fulvoflua Diakonoff, 1983
- Metendothenia heterophenga Diakonoff, 1992
- Metendothenia plecta Diakonoff, 1983
- Microsarotis pauliani Diakonoff, 1988
- Midaellobes rubrostrigana (Mabille, 1900)
- Neaspasia loxochlamys Diakonoff, 1989
- Niphadophylax hemicycla Diakonoff, 1992
- Niphadostola asceta Diakonoff, 1989
- Niphadostola chionea Diakonoff, 1989
- Niphadostola crocosema Diakonoff, 1989
- Niphothixa amphibola Diakonoff, 1960
- Niphothixa atava Diakonoff, 1970
- Niphothixa niphadacra Diakonoff, 1960
- Notocelia albosectana (Mabille, 1900)
- Notocelia cycloides Diakonoff, 1989
- Olethreutes anisorrhopa Diakonoff, 1983
- Olethreutes polymorpha (Meyrick, 1932)
- Oligobalia viettei Diakonoff, 1988
- Pammenitis calligrapha Diakonoff, 1988
- Pandemis capnobathra (Meyrick, 1930)
- Pandemis caryocentra Diakonoff, 1960
- Pandemis croceocephala (Diakonoff, 1961)
- Pandemis croceotacta (Diakonoff, 1960)
- Pandemis crocograpta (Meyrick, 1933)
- Pandemis dispersa (Diakonoff, 1960)
- Pandemis euryloncha (Diakonoff, 1973)
- Pandemis griveaudi (Diakonoff, 1960)
- Pandemis ianus (Diakonoff, 1970)
- Pandemis lichenosema (Diakonoff, 1970)
- Pandemis marginumbra (Diakonoff, 1960)
- Pandemis metallochroma (Diakonoff, 1947)
- Pandemis minuta (Diakonoff, 1960)
- Pandemis niphostigma (Diakonoff, 1960)
- Pandemis oculosa (Diakonoff, 1960)
- Pandemis pauliani (Diakonoff, 1960)
- Pandemis perispersa (Diakonoff, 1970)
- Pandemis plutosema (Diakonoff, 1960)
- Pandemis refracta (Diakonoff, 1960)
- Pandemis regalis (Diakonoff, 1960)
- Pandemis retroflua (Diakonoff, 1960)
- Pandemis rotundata (Diakonoff, 1960)
- Pandemis sclerophylla (Diakonoff, 1960)
- Pandemis stalagmographa (Diakonoff, 1960)
- Pandemis stipulaceana (Mabille, 1900)
- Pandemis straminocula (Diakonoff, 1960)
- Pandemis subovata (Diakonoff, 1970)
- Pandemis tarda (Diakonoff, 1963)
- Pandemis xanthacra (Diakonoff, 1960)
- Pandemis xylophyes (Diakonoff, 1960)
- Panegyra cosmophora Diakonoff, 1960
- Paramesiodes longirostris Diakonoff, 1960
- Paramesiodes minor Diakonoff, 1960
- Penestostoma compsa Diakonoff, 1992
- Peteliacma torrescens Meyrick, 1912
- Phaecasiophora auroraegera Diakonoff, 1983
- Phricanthes flexilineana (Walker, 1863)
- Platysemaphora rubiginosa Diakonoff, 1960
- Plutographa anopa Diakonoff, 1989
- Plutographa authodes Diakonoff, 1992
- Plutographa brochota Diakonoff, 1989
- Plutographa cryphaea Diakonoff, 1989
- Plutographa cyanea Diakonoff, 1989
- Plutographa cyclops Diakonoff, 1970
- Plutographa dyspotma Diakonoff, 1989
- Plutographa erytema Diakonoff, 1989
- Plutographa eudela Diakonoff, 1989
- Plutographa glochydosema Diakonoff, 1989
- Plutographa heteranthera (Diakonoff, 1970)
- Plutographa latefracta Diakonoff, 1989
- Plutographa lichenophyes Diakonoff, 1989
- Plutographa microsarca Diakonoff, 1989
- Plutographa monopa Diakonoff, 1989
- Plutographa nigrivittata Diakonoff, 1989
- Plutographa orbiculi Diakonoff, 1989
- Plutographa phloena Diakonoff, 1989
- Plutographa phloeorrhages (Diakonoff, 1970)
- Plutographa pictura (Diakonoff, 1970)
- Plutographa reducta Diakonoff, 1989
- Plutographa rhodana Diakonoff, 1989
- Plutographa semna Diakonoff, 1989
- Plutographa seriopa Diakonoff, 1989
- Plutographa spodostoma Diakonoff, 1989
- Plutographa tetracelis Diakonoff, 1989
- Plutographa tomion Diakonoff, 1989
- Plutographa transversa (Diakonoff, 1970)
- Plutographa xyloglypha Diakonoff, 1989
- Potiosa vapulata (Diakonoff, 1963)
- Procrica imitans (Diakonoff, 1947)
- Procrica intrepida (Meyrick, 1912)
- Procrica semilutea Diakonoff, 1960
- Prophaecasia caemelionopa Diakonoff, 1983
- Retinia mecynopus Diakonoff, 1989
- Rhodotoxotis arciferana (Mabille, 1900)
- Rhodotoxotis heteromorpha Diakonoff, 1992
- Rhodotoxotis phylochrysa Diakonoff, 1992
- Rhodotoxotis plutostola Diakonoff, 1992
- Sociognatha oligoropa Diakonoff, 1989
- Stephanopyga legnota Diakonoff, 1988
- Strepsicrates penechra (Diakonoff, 1989)
- Strepsicrates rhothia (Meyrick, 1910)
- Stygitropha funebris Diakonoff, 1983
- Syngamoneura rubronotana Mabille, 1900
- Syropetrova viridis Diakonoff, 1970
- Tetramoera leptalea Diakonoff, 1988
- Tetramoera schistaceana (Snellen, 1891)
- Thaumatotibia apicinudana (Mabille, 1900)
- Thaumatotibia batrachopa (Meyrick, 1908)
- Thaumatotibia dolichogonia (Diakonoff, 1988)
- Thaumatotibia leucotreta (Meyrick, 1913)
- Thaumatotibia macrogona (Diakonoff, 1988)
- Thylacandra argyromixtana (Mabille, 1900)
- Thylacandra malgassana (Saalmüller, 1880)
- Thylacandra sycophyes Diakonoff, 1970
- Thylacogaster rhodomenia Diakonoff, 1988
- Trymalitis optima Meyrick, 1911
- Trymalitis scalifera Meyrick, 1912
- Vialonga pallior Diakonoff, 1960
- Vialonga polyantha Diakonoff, 1960
- Viettea spectabilis Diakonoff, 1960
- Xenophylla megalogona (Diakonoff, 1947)
- Xenopotamia radians Diakonoff, 1983
- Xenosocia acrophora Diakonoff, 1989
- Xenosocia argyritis Diakonoff, 1989
- Xenosocia dynastes Diakonoff, 1992
- Xenosocia euryptycha Diakonoff, 1989
- Xenosocia iocinctis Diakonoff, 1989
- Xenosocia lampouris Diakonoff, 1989
- Xenosocia panegyrica Diakonoff, 1989
- Xenosocia polyschelis Diakonoff, 1989
- Xenosocia tryphera Diakonoff, 1989
- Yunusemreia triangulum (Diakonoff, 1970)

== Uraniidae ==
- Acropteris insticta Warren, 1897
- Acropteris vacuata Warren, 1897
- Chrysiridia rhipheus (Drury, 1773)
- Dirades bonoraae Boudinot, 1982
- Dirades incerta Boudinot, 1982
- Dirades theclata (Guenée, 1858)
- Epiplema andringitra Boudinot, 1982
- Epiplema ankafina Boudinot, 1982
- Epiplema bongo Boudinot, 1982
- Epiplema carayoni Boudinot, 1982
- Epiplema fletcheri Boudinot, 1982
- Epiplema griveaudi Boudinot, 1982
- Epiplema herbuloti Boudinot, 1982
- Epiplema lemairei Boudinot, 1982
- Epiplema malagasy Boudinot, 1982
- Epiplema pauliani Boudinot, 1982
- Epiplema perineti Boudinot, 1982
- Epiplema peyrierasi Boudinot, 1982
- Epiplema sogai Boudinot, 1982
- Epiplema toulgoeti Boudinot, 1982
- Madepiplema andrefana Boudinot, 1982
- Madepiplema zombitsy Boudinot, 1982
- Micronia semifasciata Mabille, 1880
- Urapteritra antsianakaria (Oberthür, 1923)
- Urapteritra lobularia (Mabille, 1880)
- Urapteritra malgassaria (Mabille, 1878)
- Urapteritra mabillei Viette, 1972
- Urapteritra montana Viette, 1972
- Urapteritra piperita (Oberthür, 1923)
- Urapteritra suavis (Oberthür, 1923)

== Xyloryctidae ==
- Amontes princeps Viette, 1958
- Anoditica concretella Viette, 1956
- Betroka jacobsella Viette, 1955
- Catanomistis loxophracta Meyrick, 1933
- Eporycta pachnoscia Meyrick, 1915
- Exoditis boisduvalella Viette, 1956
- Exoditis dominiqueae Viette, 1955
- Exoditis janineae Viette, 1955
- Exoditis subfurcata Meyrick, 1933
- Exoditis sylvestrella Viette, 1955
- Exoditis vadonella Viette, 1955
- Ghuryx perinetella Viette, 1956
- Ghuryx venosella Viette, 1956
- Herbulotiana abceda Viette, 1954
- Herbulotiana altitudinella Viette, 1963
- Herbulotiana atypicella Viette, 1956
- Herbulotiana benoistella Viette, 1954
- Herbulotiana bernardiiella Viette, 1954
- Herbulotiana bicolorata Viette, 1954
- Herbulotiana catalaella Viette, 1954
- Herbulotiana collectella Viette, 1956
- Herbulotiana halarcta (Meyrick, 1917)
- Herbulotiana longifascia Viette, 1954
- Herbulotiana paulianella Viette, 1954
- Herbulotiana robustella Viette, 1956
- Herbulotiana rungsella Viette, 1954
- Herbulotiana septella Viette, 1956
- Herbulotiana vadonella Viette, 1956
- Herbulotiana violacea Viette, 1954
- Mnarolitia ambreella Viette, 1968
- Mnarolitia griveaudi Viette, 1967
- Mnarolitia nectaropa (Meyrick, 1914)
- Mnarolitia paulianellum Viette, 1954
- Mnarolitia similans Viette, 1967
- Mnarolitia sylvestrella Viette, 1968
- Mocquerysiella albicosta Viette, 1954
- Mocquerysiella bourginella Viette, 1954
- Phracyps lebisella Viette, 1955
- Phracyps longifasciella Viette, 1955
- Phracyps waterloti Viette, 1952
- Pseudoprocometis baronella Viette, 1956
- Chrysotypus dives Butler, 1879
- Pseudoprocometis helle Viette, 1952
- Pseudoprocometis robletella Viette, 1956
- Scieropepla byblinopa Meyrick,
- Scieropepla gibeauxella Viette, 1986
- Scieropepla minetorum Viette, 1987
- Scieropepla nephelocentra Meyrick, 1933
- Scieropepla peyrierasella Viette, 1986
- Xylorycta malgassella Viette, 1956

== Yponomeutidae ==
- Eremothyris candidella Viette, 1963
- Eremothyris griveaudi Gibeaux, 1982
- Eremothyris iambiodella Viette, 1958
- Eremothyris luctuosa Gibeaux, 1982
- Eremothyris luqueti Gibeaux, 1993
- Eremothyris ratovosoni Gibeaux, 1982
- Eremothyris tabulatrix (Meyrick, 1930)
- Eremothyris toulgoeti Gibeaux, 1982
- Eremothyris viettei Gibeaux, 1982
- Parahyponomeuta malgassaella Viette, 1955
- Rhabdocosma dolini Gershenson, 2001
- Swammerdamia villiersi Gibeaux, 1984
- Trichocirca decaryanum Viette, 1954
- Trisophista pauli Viette, 1968
- Yponomeuta madagascariensis Gershenson, 2001
- Yponomeuta strigillatus Zeller, 1852
- Zelleria kesslerioides Gibeaux, 1985

== Zygaenidae ==
- Ankasocris striatus Viette, 1965
- Ischnusia culiculina (Mabille, 1878)
- Madaprocris minetorum Viette, 1978
- Sthenoprocris brondeli Viette, 1978
- Sthenoprocris malgassica Hampson, 1920

== See also ==
- List of butterflies of Madagascar
