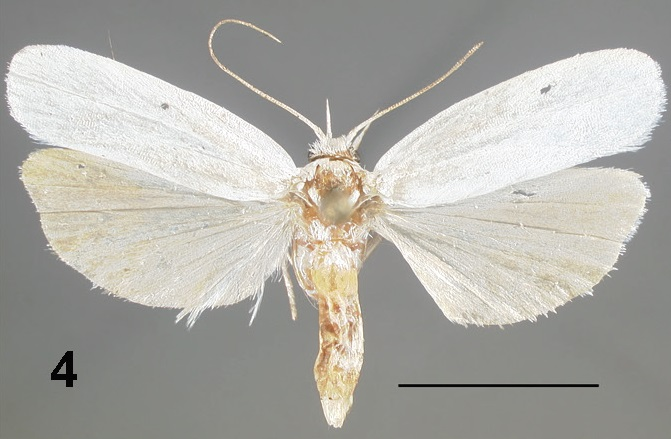
- Antaeotricha floridella

Scientific classification
- Kingdom: Animalia
- Phylum: Arthropoda
- Class: Insecta
- Order: Lepidoptera
- Family: Depressariidae
- Subfamily: Stenomatinae; Meyrick, 1906

= Stenomatinae =

Subfamily of small moths

The Stenomatinae are a subfamily of small moths in the family Depressariidae.

== Taxonomy and systematics ==
- Agriophara Rosenstock, 1885
- Amontes Viette, 1958
- Anadasmus Walsingham, 1897
- Anapatris Meyrick, 1932
- Antaeotricha Zeller, 1854
- Aproopta Turner, 1919
- Baeonoma Meyrick, 1916
- Catarata Walsingham, 1912
- Cerconota Meyrick, 1915
- Chlamydastis Meyrick, 1916
- Dinotropa Meyrick, 1916
- Energia Walsingham, 1912
- Eriogenes Meyrick, 1925
- Falculina Zeller, 1877
- Gonioterma Walsingham, 1897
- Herbulotiana Viette, 1954
- Hyalopseustis Meyrick, 1925
- †Hexerites Cockerell, 1933
- Lethata Duckworth, 1964
- Loxotoma Zeller, 1854
- Menesta Clemens, 1860
- Menestomorpha Walsingham, 1907
- Mocquerysiella Viette, 1954
- Mothonica Walsingham, 1912
- Mysaromima Meyrick, 1926
- Nothochalara Diakonoff, 1954
- Orphnolechia Meyrick, 1909
- Parascaeas Meyrick, 1936
- Paraspastis Meyrick, 1915
- Petalothyrsa Meyrick, 1931
- Petasanthes Meyrick, 1925
- Phelotropa Meyrick, 1915
- Phylomictis Meyrick, 1890
- Promenesta Busck, 1914
- Proscedes Diakonoff, 1954
- Rectiostoma Becker, 1982
- Rhodanassa Meyrick, 1915
- Stenoma Zeller, 1839
- Thioscelis Meyrick, 1909
- Timocratica Meyrick, 1912
- Zetesima Walsingham, 1912
