= Thioscelis geranomorpha =

Scientific classification
- Kingdom: Animalia
- Phylum: Arthropoda
- Class: Insecta
- Order: Lepidoptera
- Family: Depressariidae
- Genus: Thioscelis
- Species: T. geranomorpha

Binomial name
- Thioscelis geranomorpha Meyrick, 1932

Species of moth

Thioscelis geranomorpha is a moth in the family Depressariidae. It was described by Edward Meyrick in 1932. It is found in Brazil in the states of Rio de Janeiro and São Paulo.

The wingspan is 55–60 mm. The forewings are light brown irregularly shaded with darker scaling, the maculation is as for Thioscelis directrix except for the subterminal and terminal transverse lines, which are solid, and irregular black shading at the apex. The hindwings are dark brown to black.
