= Mothonica =

Scientific classification
- Domain: Eukaryota
- Kingdom: Animalia
- Phylum: Arthropoda
- Class: Insecta
- Order: Lepidoptera
- Family: Depressariidae
- Subfamily: Stenomatinae
- Genus: Mothonica; Walsingham, 1912

Genus of moths

Mothonica is a genus of moths in the family Depressariidae.

== Species ==
- Mothonica cubana Duckworth, 1969
- Mothonica fluminata (Meyrick, 1912)
- Mothonica ocellea Forbes, 1930
- Mothonica periapta Walsingham, 1912

== Former species ==
- Mothonica kimballi Duckworth, 1964
