= Falculina antitypa =

Scientific classification
- Domain: Eukaryota
- Kingdom: Animalia
- Phylum: Arthropoda
- Class: Insecta
- Order: Lepidoptera
- Family: Depressariidae
- Genus: Falculina
- Species: F. antitypa

Binomial name
- Falculina antitypa Meyrick, 1916

Species of moth

Falculina antitypa is a moth in the family Depressariidae. It was described by Edward Meyrick in 1916. It is found in French Guiana.

The wingspan is 24–36 mm. The forewings and hindwings are identical to those of Falculina ochricostata.
