= Amonte =

Amonte is a surname. Notable people with this surname include:

- Kelly Amonte Hiller, American lacrosse player and coach
- Tony Amonte (born 1970), American ice hockey player, brother of Kelly

== See also ==
- Amontes, genus of moths
