= Falculina kasyi =

Scientific classification
- Domain: Eukaryota
- Kingdom: Animalia
- Phylum: Arthropoda
- Class: Insecta
- Order: Lepidoptera
- Family: Depressariidae
- Genus: Falculina
- Species: F. kasyi

Binomial name
- Falculina kasyi Duckworth, 1966

Species of moth

Falculina kasyi is a moth in the family Depressariidae. It was described by W. Donald Duckworth in 1966. It is found in Suriname, French Guiana and Amazonas, Brazil.

The wingspan is 26–28 mm. The antenna, head, legs, thorax, forewings and hindwings are identical to those of Falculina ochricostata.

== Etymology ==
The species is named in honor of Dr. Fritz Kasy, lepidopterist at the Natural History Museum, Vienna, Austria.
