= Falculina bella =

Scientific classification
- Domain: Eukaryota
- Kingdom: Animalia
- Phylum: Arthropoda
- Class: Insecta
- Order: Lepidoptera
- Family: Depressariidae
- Genus: Falculina
- Species: F. bella

Binomial name
- Falculina bella Duckworth, 1966

Species of moth

Falculina bella is a moth in the family Depressariidae. It was described by W. Donald Duckworth in 1966. It is found in Amazonas, Brazil.

The wingspan is about 28 mm. The forewings and hindwings are identical to those of Falculina ochricostata.
