= Lethata mucida =

Scientific classification
- Domain: Eukaryota
- Kingdom: Animalia
- Phylum: Arthropoda
- Class: Insecta
- Order: Lepidoptera
- Family: Depressariidae
- Genus: Lethata
- Species: L. mucida

Binomial name
- Lethata mucida Duckworth, 1967

Species of moth

Lethata mucida is a moth of the family Depressariidae. It is found in Colombia.

The wingspan is about 28 mm. The forewings are as in Lethata obscura, except with heavy suffusion of purplish in the anal area. The hindwings are whitish, heavily overcast with grey scales.
