= Thioscelis whalleyi =

Scientific classification
- Kingdom: Animalia
- Phylum: Arthropoda
- Class: Insecta
- Order: Lepidoptera
- Family: Depressariidae
- Genus: Thioscelis
- Species: T. whalleyi

Binomial name
- Thioscelis whalleyi Duckworth, 1967

Species of moth

Thioscelis whalleyi is a moth in the family Depressariidae. It was described by W. Donald Duckworth in 1967. It is found in Brazil in the states of Goiás and Rio de Janeiro.

The wingspan is 50–52 mm. The forewings are as in Thioscelis directrix except for the subterminal line, which is straighter, arising nearer the apex on the costa. The hindwings are as in T. directrix.
