= Lethata =

Scientific classification
- Domain: Eukaryota
- Kingdom: Animalia
- Phylum: Arthropoda
- Class: Insecta
- Order: Lepidoptera
- Family: Depressariidae
- Subfamily: Stenomatinae
- Genus: Lethata; Duckworth, 1964

Genus of moths

Lethata is a genus of moths in the subfamily Stenomatinae.

== Species ==
- Lethata aletha Duckworth, 1967
- Lethata amazona Duckworth, 1967
- Lethata angusta Duckworth, 1967
- Lethata anophthalma (Meyrick, 1931)
- Lethata aromatica (Meyrick, 1915)
- Lethata asthenopa (Meyrick, 1916)
- Lethata bovinella (Busck, 1914)
- Lethata buscki Duckworth, 1964
- Lethata dispersa Duckworth, 1967
- Lethata fernandezyepezi Duckworth, 1967
- Lethata fusca Duckworth, 1964
- Lethata glaucopa (Meyrick, 1912)
- Lethata gypsolitha (Meyrick, 1931)
- Lethata herbacea (Meyrick, 1931)
- Lethata illustra Duckworth, 1967
- Lethata irresoluta Duckworth, 1967
- Lethata lanosa Duckworth, 1967
- Lethata leucothea (Busck, 1914)
- Lethata monopa Duckworth, 1967
- Lethata mucida Duckworth, 1967
- Lethata myopina (Zeller, 1877)
- Lethata myrochroa (Meyrick, 1915)
- Lethata obscura Duckworth, 1967
- Lethata oculosa Duckworth, 1967
- Lethata optima Duckworth, 1967
- Lethata psidii (Sepp, [1852])
- Lethata pyrenodes (Meyrick, 1915)
- Lethata ruba Duckworth, 1964
- Lethata satyropa (Meyrick, 1915)
- Lethata sciophthalma (Meyrick, 1931)
- Lethata striolata (Meyrick, 1932)
- Lethata trochalosticta (Walsingham, 1913)
