= Promenesta leucomias =

Scientific classification
- Domain: Eukaryota
- Kingdom: Animalia
- Phylum: Arthropoda
- Class: Insecta
- Order: Lepidoptera
- Family: Depressariidae
- Genus: Promenesta
- Species: P. leucomias

Binomial name
- Promenesta leucomias Meyrick, 1925

Species of moth

Promenesta leucomias is a moth in the family Depressariidae. It was described by Edward Meyrick in 1925. It is found in Pará, Brazil.

The wingspan is 13–14 mm. The forewings are rather light fuscous with the costal edge yellow ochreous and with a round apex and termen, as well as a series of short dark fuscous marks separated by pale ochreous. The hindwings are dark grey.
