= Herbulotiana halarcta =

Scientific classification
- Domain: Eukaryota
- Kingdom: Animalia
- Phylum: Arthropoda
- Class: Insecta
- Order: Lepidoptera
- Family: Depressariidae
- Genus: Herbulotiana
- Species: H. halarcta

Binomial name
- Herbulotiana halarcta (Meyrick, 1917)

Synonyms
- Agriophara halarcta Meyrick, 1917

Species of moth

Herbulotiana halarcta is a moth in the family Depressariidae. It was described by Edward Meyrick in 1917. It is found in Madagascar.

The wingspan is about 26 mm. The forewings are brown, irrorated with pale ochreous and dark brown and with an irregular basal patch of purple suffusion except towards the costa. There is some purple suffusion in the middle of the disc, followed by a very undefined blotch of light ochreous suffusion, beyond which is an angulated fascia of purple suffusion running very near the posterior part of the costa and termen to before the tornus. The hindwings are whitish-fuscous.
