= Falculina =

Scientific classification
- Kingdom: Animalia
- Phylum: Arthropoda
- Clade: Pancrustacea
- Class: Insecta
- Order: Lepidoptera
- Family: Depressariidae
- Subfamily: Stenomatinae
- Genus: Falculina; Zeller, 1877

Genus of moths

Falculina is a genus of moths in the subfamily Stenomatinae.

== Species ==
- Falculina antitypa Meyrick, 1916
- Falculina bella Duckworth, 1966
- Falculina caustopis Meyrick, 1932
- Falculina kasyi Duckworth, 1966
- Falculina lepidota Meyrick, 1916
- Falculina ochricostata Zeller, 1877
