= Herbulotiana violacea =

Scientific classification
- Domain: Eukaryota
- Kingdom: Animalia
- Phylum: Arthropoda
- Class: Insecta
- Order: Lepidoptera
- Family: Depressariidae
- Genus: Herbulotiana
- Species: H. violacea

Binomial name
- Herbulotiana violacea Viette, 1954

Species of moth

Herbulotiana violacea is a moth in the family Depressariidae. It was described by Pierre Viette in 1954. It is found in Madagascar.
