= Lethata amazona =

Scientific classification
- Domain: Eukaryota
- Kingdom: Animalia
- Phylum: Arthropoda
- Class: Insecta
- Order: Lepidoptera
- Family: Depressariidae
- Genus: Lethata
- Species: L. amazona

Binomial name
- Lethata amazona Duckworth, 1967

Species of moth

Lethata amazona is a moth of the family Depressariidae. It is found in Amazonas, Brazil.

The wingspan is about 38 mm. The forewings are rosy tan with the costa narrowly deep ochreous and the dorsal edge brown. There is a white suffusion from the middle of the base, blending outward and upward with the ground color. A spot is found at the end of the cell, composed of a ring of white enclosing a brown transverse line. There is also a spot in the fold at the basal one-third, composed of a ring of white enclosing a brown spot. A median spot at the basal one-third is white with faint brown scaling in the center. The entire wing is sprinkled with occasional brown scales. The hindwings are yellow ochreous, deepening toward the apex.
