= Phelotropa =

Scientific classification
- Kingdom: Animalia
- Phylum: Arthropoda
- Class: Insecta
- Order: Lepidoptera
- Family: Depressariidae
- Subfamily: Stenomatinae
- Genus: Phelotropa; Meyrick, 1915

Genus of moths

Phelotropa is a moth genus of the family Depressariidae.

== Species ==
- Phelotropa conversa Meyrick, 1923
- Phelotropa oenodes Meyrick, 1915
