= Lethata ruba =

Scientific classification
- Domain: Eukaryota
- Kingdom: Animalia
- Phylum: Arthropoda
- Class: Insecta
- Order: Lepidoptera
- Family: Depressariidae
- Genus: Lethata
- Species: L. ruba

Binomial name
- Lethata ruba Duckworth, 1964

Species of moth

Lethata ruba is a moth in the family Depressariidae. It was described by W. Donald Duckworth in 1964. It is found in Paraná, Brazil.

The wingspan is about 30 mm. The forewings are deep yellow ochreous with the costa narrowly brick red. A broad band of pink extends parallel to the costa from the base to the apex, blending into the ground color at the apical third. There is a fuscous spot at the end of the cell and a few fuscous scales scattered over the entire wing. The hindwings are whitish ochreous, lightly shaded with grey.
