= Lethata bovinella =

Scientific classification
- Domain: Eukaryota
- Kingdom: Animalia
- Phylum: Arthropoda
- Class: Insecta
- Order: Lepidoptera
- Family: Depressariidae
- Genus: Lethata
- Species: L. bovinella

Binomial name
- Lethata bovinella (Busck, 1914)

Synonyms
- Stenoma bovinella Busck, 1914; Stenoma curiata Meyrick, 1929; Stenoma indistincta Amsel, 1956

Species of moth

Lethata bovinella is a moth in the family Depressariidae. It was described by August Busck in 1914. It is found in Panama, Venezuela and Colombia.

The wingspan is about 19 mm. The forewings are light brown with the costal edge narrowly vivid brick red. From the middle of the costa to the basal angle of the dorsum runs a darker, blackish-brown, nearly straight line and from the apical fourth of the costa to the apical fourth of the dorsum runs an outwardly evenly curved, blackish-brown line. At the end of the cell is a circlet of blackish-brown scales, enclosing a brown area, which is slightly lighter than the rest of the wing. There are a few scattered blackish-brown scales on all parts of the wing. The hindwings are light ochreous.
