= Phylomictis lintearia =

Scientific classification
- Kingdom: Animalia
- Phylum: Arthropoda
- Clade: Pancrustacea
- Class: Insecta
- Order: Lepidoptera
- Family: Depressariidae
- Genus: Phylomictis
- Species: P. lintearia

Binomial name
- Phylomictis lintearia Meyrick, 1921

Species of moth

Phylomictis lintearia is a moth in the family Depressariidae. It was described by Edward Meyrick in 1921. It is found in Australia, where it has been recorded from Queensland and New South Wales.

The wingspan is about 20 mm. The forewings are whitish irrorated fuscous, with the stigmata cloudy, light brownish, the plical rather beyond the first discal. There is an oblique series of two or three small spots of dark grey irroration from the costa to the first and second discal respectively, and a strongly curved subterminal series of similar spots. The hindwings are pale grey.
