= Lethata aletha =

Scientific classification
- Domain: Eukaryota
- Kingdom: Animalia
- Phylum: Arthropoda
- Class: Insecta
- Order: Lepidoptera
- Family: Depressariidae
- Genus: Lethata
- Species: L. aletha

Binomial name
- Lethata aletha Duckworth, 1967

Species of moth

Lethata aletha is a moth of the family Depressariidae. It is found in south-eastern Peru.

The wingspan is about 33 mm. The forewings are brown shaded with deep ochreous scales and with the costa narrowly deep ochreous. The dorsum is purplish to the apical two-thirds and there is a spot at the end of the cell consisting of purplish scales overcast with whitish scales. The termen is shaded with deep ochreous. The hindwings are whitish, heavily shaded with grey scales in the anal area.
