= Anadasmus pelinitis =

Scientific classification
- Kingdom: Animalia
- Phylum: Arthropoda
- Class: Insecta
- Order: Lepidoptera
- Family: Depressariidae
- Genus: Anadasmus
- Species: A. pelinitis

Binomial name
- Anadasmus pelinitis (Meyrick, 1912)

Synonyms
- Stenoma pelinitis Meyrick, 1912

Species of moth

Anadasmus pelinitis is a moth of the family Depressariidae. It is found in Colombia.

The wingspan is 34–38 mm. The forewings are light greyish-ochreous, more or less sprinkled with dark brown and with the costal edge ochreous-whitish. The stigmata are dark fuscous or blackish, the plical obliquely beyond the first discal. There is a cloudy fuscous transverse shade at three-fifths, strongly curved outwards in the disc around the second discal stigma. There is a similarly curved subterminal series of dark fuscous dots, as well as a series of dark fuscous dots around the apex and termen. The hindwings are whitish-ochreous, sometimes faintly tinged with fuscous.
