= Anadasmus quadratella =

Scientific classification
- Kingdom: Animalia
- Phylum: Arthropoda
- Class: Insecta
- Order: Lepidoptera
- Family: Depressariidae
- Genus: Anadasmus
- Species: A. quadratella

Binomial name
- Anadasmus quadratella (Walker, 1864)

Synonyms
- Cryptolechia quadratella Walker, 1864; Mesoptycha hebes Dognin, 1905; Gonioterma gerda Busck, 1914

Species of moth

Anadasmus quadratella is a moth in the family Depressariidae. It was described by Francis Walker in 1864. It is found in Panama, Suriname and Colombia.

The wingspan is about 29 mm. The forewings are light yellowish brown with the costal and terminal edges narrowly light yellow. On the middle of the fold is a small black dot and at the end of the cell is a similar black dot. From the apical fourth of the costa runs a faint darker brown line across the wing to the dorsum. This line is sharply inwardly bent just below the costa, then evenly outwardly curved, terminating just before the beginning of the cilia. The hindwings are yellowish fuscous with a narrow yellow edge.
