= Promenesta triacmopa =

Scientific classification
- Domain: Eukaryota
- Kingdom: Animalia
- Phylum: Arthropoda
- Class: Insecta
- Order: Lepidoptera
- Family: Depressariidae
- Genus: Promenesta
- Species: P. triacmopa

Binomial name
- Promenesta triacmopa (Meyrick, 1931)

Synonyms
- Stenoma triacmopa Meyrick, 1931

Species of moth

Promenesta triacmopa is a moth in the family Depressariidae. It was described by Edward Meyrick in 1931. It is found in Paraguay.
