= Loxotoma =

Scientific classification
- Kingdom: Animalia
- Phylum: Arthropoda
- Clade: Pancrustacea
- Class: Insecta
- Order: Lepidoptera
- Family: Depressariidae
- Subfamily: Stenomatinae
- Genus: Loxotoma; Zeller, 1854

Genus of moths

Loxotoma is a moth genus of the family Depressariidae.

== Species ==
- Loxotoma elegans Zeller, 1854
- Loxotoma seminigrens Meyrick, 1932
