= Lethata striolata =

Scientific classification
- Kingdom: Animalia
- Phylum: Arthropoda
- Clade: Pancrustacea
- Class: Insecta
- Order: Lepidoptera
- Family: Depressariidae
- Genus: Lethata
- Species: L. striolata

Binomial name
- Lethata striolata (Meyrick, 1932)

Synonyms
- Stenoma striolata Meyrick, 1932

Species of moth

Lethata striolata is a moth in the family Depressariidae. It was described by Edward Meyrick in 1932. It is found in Brazil (Santa Catharina).
