= Herbulotiana altitudinella =

Scientific classification
- Domain: Eukaryota
- Kingdom: Animalia
- Phylum: Arthropoda
- Class: Insecta
- Order: Lepidoptera
- Family: Depressariidae
- Genus: Herbulotiana
- Species: H. altitudinella

Binomial name
- Herbulotiana altitudinella Viette, 1963

Species of moth

Herbulotiana altitudinella is a moth in the family Depressariidae. It was described by Pierre Viette in 1963. It is known from Madagascar.

This species has a wingspan of 24-26mm for the male and 38–41 mm for the female. The forewings are greyish, with white and black markings.
