= Anadasmus lithogypsa =

Scientific classification
- Kingdom: Animalia
- Phylum: Arthropoda
- Class: Insecta
- Order: Lepidoptera
- Family: Depressariidae
- Genus: Anadasmus
- Species: A. lithogypsa

Binomial name
- Anadasmus lithogypsa (Meyrick, 1932)

Synonyms
- Stenoma lithogypsa Meyrick, 1932

Species of moth

Anadasmus lithogypsa is a moth in the family Depressariidae. It was described by Edward Meyrick in 1932. It is found in Brazil.
