= Lethata herbacea =

Scientific classification
- Kingdom: Animalia
- Phylum: Arthropoda
- Class: Insecta
- Order: Lepidoptera
- Family: Depressariidae
- Genus: Lethata
- Species: L. herbacea

Binomial name
- Lethata herbacea (Meyrick, 1931)

Synonyms
- Stenoma herbacea Meyrick, 1931

Species of moth

Lethata herbacea is a moth in the family Depressariidae. It was described by Edward Meyrick in 1931. It is found in Brazil (São Paulo).
