= Nothochalara =

Scientific classification
- Kingdom: Animalia
- Phylum: Arthropoda
- Class: Insecta
- Order: Lepidoptera
- Family: Depressariidae
- Subfamily: Stenomatinae
- Genus: Nothochalara; Diakonoff, 1954
- Species: N. sordida

Binomial name
- Nothochalara sordida Diakonoff, 1954

Species of insect

Nothochalara sordida is a moth in the family Depressariidae, and the only species in the genus Nothochalara. It was described by Alexey Diakonoff in 1954. It is found in New Guinea.
