= Lethata buscki =

Scientific classification
- Kingdom: Animalia
- Phylum: Arthropoda
- Clade: Pancrustacea
- Class: Insecta
- Order: Lepidoptera
- Family: Depressariidae
- Genus: Lethata
- Species: L. buscki

Binomial name
- Lethata buscki Duckworth, 1964

Species of moth

Lethata buscki is a moth in the family Depressariidae. It was described by W. Donald Duckworth in 1964. It is found in Belize, Honduras and Mexico.

The wingspan is 19–21 mm (0.75–0.83 in). The forewings are deep ochreous with the costa rose. There is a spot at the end of the cell, composed of a ring of fuscous surrounding white scales. The hindwings are light ochreous slightly overcast with grey scales.
