= Catarata obnubila =

Scientific classification
- Domain: Eukaryota
- Kingdom: Animalia
- Phylum: Arthropoda
- Class: Insecta
- Order: Lepidoptera
- Family: Depressariidae
- Genus: Catarata
- Species: C. obnubila

Binomial name
- Catarata obnubila Busck, 1914

Species of moth

Catarata obnubila is a moth in the family Depressariidae. It was described by August Busck in 1914. It is found in Panama.

The wingspan is 12–13 mm. The forewings are blackish brown toward the base and along the costal edge. This color gradually shades into a light olive grey which covers the greater outer part of the wing. From the apical fourth of the costal edge runs a broad, reddish-brown streak obliquely across the tip of the wing to the tornus and outside this streak the wing is iridescent, metallic violaceous. The males have on the underside of the forewings near the base a large tuft of hairs, at rest lying longitudinally and covering the basal two thirds of the cell. The hindwings are dark fuscous.
