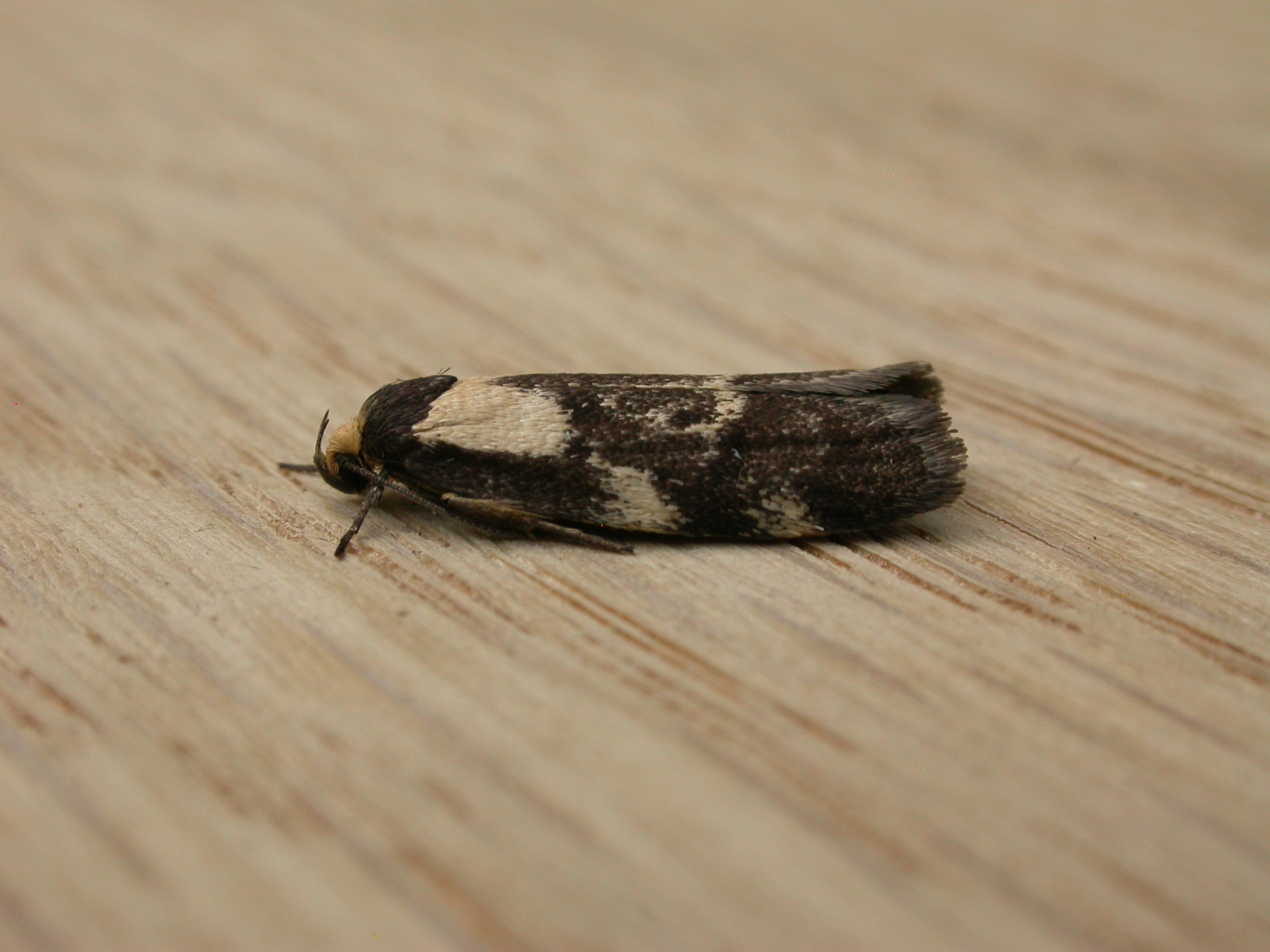

Scientific classification
- Domain: Eukaryota
- Kingdom: Animalia
- Phylum: Arthropoda
- Class: Insecta
- Order: Lepidoptera
- Family: Depressariidae
- Genus: Phylomictis
- Species: P. maligna

Binomial name
- Phylomictis maligna Meyrick, 1890

= Phylomictis maligna =

Species of moth

Phylomictis maligna is a moth in the family Depressariidae. It was described by Edward Meyrick in 1890. It is found in Australia, where it has been recorded from Victoria.

The wingspan is about 23 mm. The forewings are white, slightly ochreous tinged, with a thick irregular dark grey streak along the inner margin from the base to the anal angle and an irregular much interrupted dark fuscous transverse line from one-third of the costa to the dorsal streak beyond the middle. There is a dark fuscous dot in the disc at two-thirds and the apical two-fifths of the wing are wholly fuscous, sprinkled with darker fuscous, and with a curved subterminal and hindmarginal series of obscure whitish marks. The hindwings are fuscous, darker towards the hindmargin.
