= Lethata illustra =

Scientific classification
- Domain: Eukaryota
- Kingdom: Animalia
- Phylum: Arthropoda
- Class: Insecta
- Order: Lepidoptera
- Family: Depressariidae
- Genus: Lethata
- Species: L. illustra

Binomial name
- Lethata illustra Duckworth, 1967

Species of moth

Lethata illustra is a moth of the family Depressariidae. It is found in Peru.

The wingspan is 27–32 mm. The forewings are brown shaded with darker brown on the basal two-thirds and with the costa narrowly ochreous. There is a spot at the end of the cell, consisting of a ring of purplish scales enclosing a white spot. There is also a faint, outwardly curving transverse line from the costa above the spot to near the tornus. The entire wing is sprinkled with fuscous scales. The hindwings are whitish overcast with grey.
