= Anadasmus plebicola =

Scientific classification
- Kingdom: Animalia
- Phylum: Arthropoda
- Class: Insecta
- Order: Lepidoptera
- Family: Depressariidae
- Genus: Anadasmus
- Species: A. plebicola

Binomial name
- Anadasmus plebicola (Meyrick, 1918)

Synonyms
- Stenoma plebicola Meyrick, 1918

Species of moth

Anadasmus plebicola is a moth in the family Depressariidae. It was described by Edward Meyrick in 1918. It is found in French Guiana and Guyana.

The wingspan is 26–28 mm. The forewings are light greyish-ochreous, very faintly pinkish-tinged. The plical and second discal stigmata are small and blackish-grey and there is a line of indistinct cloudy grey dots from the costa at three-fourths to the dorsum at four-fifths, curved outwards from one-third to three-fourths of its length. A marginal series of blackish dots is found around the apex and termen. The hindwings are grey.
