= Lethata anophthalma =

Scientific classification
- Kingdom: Animalia
- Phylum: Arthropoda
- Class: Insecta
- Order: Lepidoptera
- Family: Depressariidae
- Genus: Lethata
- Species: L. anophthalma

Binomial name
- Lethata anophthalma (Meyrick, 1931)

Synonyms
- Stenoma anophthalma Meyrick, 1931; Stenoma badiella Amsel, 1956; Lethata maculata Duckworth, 1964

Species of moth

Lethata anophthalma is a moth of the family Depressariidae. It is found in Brazil (Paraná, Amazonas), Venezuela, Bolivia, Paraguay, northern Argentina, French Guiana and Guyana.

The larvae feed on Psidium guajava.
