= Orphnolechia crypsiphragma =

Scientific classification
- Kingdom: Animalia
- Phylum: Arthropoda
- Clade: Pancrustacea
- Class: Insecta
- Order: Lepidoptera
- Family: Depressariidae
- Genus: Orphnolechia
- Species: O. crypsiphragma

Binomial name
- Orphnolechia crypsiphragma Meyrick, 1909

Species of moth

Orphnolechia crypsiphragma is a moth in the family Depressariidae. It was described by Edward Meyrick in 1909. It is found in Bolivia. Orphnolechia is a genus of moths in the subfamily Stenomatinae.

The wingspan is about 13 mm. The forewings are dark fuscous sprinkled with grey whitish and with the stigmata round, moderate and blackish, the plical somewhat beyond the first discal. There is a small irregular white spot on the costa before the middle, and one on the dorsum beyond the middle, as well as cloudy whitish dots below the plical stigma, and above and below the second discal. The costal edge at three-fourths, and some scattered scales beneath it are white and there is a nearly straight blackish line from the costa beyond this to the termen above the tornus, as well as an interrupted blackish line around the apical portion of the costa and termen, preceded by two or three minute cloudy whitish dots. The hindwings are dark bronzy fuscous.
