= Phylomictis monochroma =

Scientific classification
- Kingdom: Animalia
- Phylum: Arthropoda
- Class: Insecta
- Order: Lepidoptera
- Family: Depressariidae
- Genus: Phylomictis
- Species: P. monochroma

Binomial name
- Phylomictis monochroma Lower, 1892

Species of moth

Phylomictis monochroma is a moth in the family Depressariidae. It was described by Oswald Bertram Lower in 1892. It is found in Australia, where it has been recorded from South Australia.
