= Lethata myrochroa =

Scientific classification
- Domain: Eukaryota
- Kingdom: Animalia
- Phylum: Arthropoda
- Class: Insecta
- Order: Lepidoptera
- Family: Depressariidae
- Genus: Lethata
- Species: L. myrochroa

Binomial name
- Lethata myrochroa (Meyrick, 1915)

Synonyms
- Stenoma myrochroa Meyrick, 1915

Species of moth

Lethata myrochroa is a moth of the family Depressariidae. It is found in Venezuela.

The wingspan is about 18 mm. The forewings are pale ochreous tinged with pinkish, the costa suffused with dull pinkish and with the extreme costal edge whitish. The stigmata are small and fuscous, the plical obliquely beyond the first discal. There is a small faint fuscous spot on the costa at one-fourth and an undefined triangular spot of pinkish-fuscous suffusion on the middle of the costa, as well as a rather curved fuscous line from a small spot on the costa beyond two-thirds to the dorsum before the tornus. The hindwings are ochreous whitish.
