= Energia subversa =

Scientific classification
- Domain: Eukaryota
- Kingdom: Animalia
- Phylum: Arthropoda
- Class: Insecta
- Order: Lepidoptera
- Family: Depressariidae
- Genus: Energia
- Species: E. subversa

Binomial name
- Energia subversa Walsingham, 1912

Species of moth

Energia subversa is a moth in the family Depressariidae. It was described by Thomas de Grey in 1912. It is found in Mexico (Vera Cruz).

== Description ==
The wingspan is about 18 mm. The forewings are rather shining, bone-white, with a wash of pale fawn-brownish, from the base to the termen along the dorsal half its margins ill-defined. There is a short brownish fuscous streak to about one-sixth from the base, between the costa and the fold and a shorter streak of the same in the fold a little before its middle, with a small spot on the disc above it, and a strong spot at the end of the cell. This spot lies in the course of the first of the two oblique, transverse, pale fawn-brownish bands, which, dilated on the middle of the costa, descends obliquely outward to the end of the cell, and is then recurved to the dorsum at two-thirds; the second follows a parallel course, commencing on the costa at three-fourths, both diffused and iU-defined. A series of eight or nine dark brownish fuscous marginal spots occur around the apex and termen. The hindwings are pale brownish grey in females and shining white, with a subcostal hair-pencil in males.
