= Baeonoma orthozona =

Scientific classification
- Domain: Eukaryota
- Kingdom: Animalia
- Phylum: Arthropoda
- Class: Insecta
- Order: Lepidoptera
- Family: Depressariidae
- Genus: Baeonoma
- Species: B. orthozona

Binomial name
- Baeonoma orthozona Meyrick, 1916

Species of moth

Baeonoma orthozona is a moth of the family Depressariidae. It is found in French Guiana.

The wingspan is 13–14 mm. The forewings are dark fuscous with a small white spot on the base of the dorsum. There is a moderately broad straight white transverse median fascia and a moderate subtriangular white spot on the costa at four-fifths. The hindwings are rather dark grey.
