= Dinotropa =

Scientific classification
- Kingdom: Animalia
- Phylum: Arthropoda
- Class: Insecta
- Order: Lepidoptera
- Family: Depressariidae
- Subfamily: Stenomatinae
- Genus: Dinotropa; Meyrick, 1916
- Species: D. ochrocrossa

Binomial name
- Dinotropa ochrocrossa Meyrick, 1916

Genus of moths

Dinotropa ochrocrossa is a moth of the family Depressariidae and the only species in the genus Dinotropa. It is found in French Guiana.

The wingspan is 12–15 mm. The forewings are whitish with scattered fuscous and blackish specks in males and light grey more or less suffusedly mixed with white and sprinkled with black in females. There is a cloudy dark grey dot on the end of the cell and a short very oblique cloudy dark grey streak from the costa before the middle, as well as an indistinct cloudy grey rather curved line from two-thirds of the costa to the tornus. The marginal edge on the posterior part of the costa and apex is tinged with ochreous and irrorated with dark fuscous. The hindwings are grey, in males subhyaline in the disc, in females thinly scaled towards the base.
