= Thioscelis fuscata =

Scientific classification
- Kingdom: Animalia
- Phylum: Arthropoda
- Class: Insecta
- Order: Lepidoptera
- Family: Depressariidae
- Genus: Thioscelis
- Species: T. fuscata

Binomial name
- Thioscelis fuscata Duckworth, 1967

Species of moth

Thioscelis fuscata is a moth in the family Depressariidae. It was described by W. Donald Duckworth in 1967. It is found in Peru.

The wingspan is about 46 mm. The forewings are dark brown, lighter on the costa basally, the median third with ill-defined black spotting. There is a subterminal transverse line consisting of a faint series of black dots and the terminal line is barely distinguishable. The hindwings are dark brown to black.
