= Anadasmus chlorotrota =

Scientific classification
- Kingdom: Animalia
- Phylum: Arthropoda
- Class: Insecta
- Order: Lepidoptera
- Family: Depressariidae
- Genus: Anadasmus
- Species: A. chlorotrota

Binomial name
- Anadasmus chlorotrota (Meyrick, 1932)

Synonyms
- Stenoma chlorotrota Meyrick, 1932

Species of moth

Anadasmus chlorotrota is a moth in the family Depressariidae. It was described by Edward Meyrick in 1932. It is found in Bolivia.
