= Orphnolechia anaphanta =

Scientific classification
- Kingdom: Animalia
- Phylum: Arthropoda
- Class: Insecta
- Order: Lepidoptera
- Family: Depressariidae
- Genus: Orphnolechia
- Species: O. anaphanta

Binomial name
- Orphnolechia anaphanta (Meyrick, 1925)

Synonyms
- Stenoma anaphanta Meyrick, 1925

Species of moth

Orphnolechia anaphanta is a moth of the family Depressariidae. It is found in Brazil (Amazonas, Para).

The wingspan is about 11 mm. The forewings are dark fuscous, in males with a short subcostal and longer supramedian spindle-shaped longitudinal yellowish streak towards the base, normally imperceptible but apparently disclosed by splitting and rolling up of covering film. There is a rather curved slender white streak from before the middle of the costa to beyond the middle of the dorsum and a slender crenulate white streak around the apex and upper two-thirds of the termen. The hindwings are rather dark grey, becoming dark fuscous posteriorly.
