= Lethata fusca =

Scientific classification
- Domain: Eukaryota
- Kingdom: Animalia
- Phylum: Arthropoda
- Class: Insecta
- Order: Lepidoptera
- Family: Depressariidae
- Genus: Lethata
- Species: L. fusca

Binomial name
- Lethata fusca Duckworth, 1964

Species of moth

Lethata fusca is a moth in the family Depressariidae. It was described by W. Donald Duckworth in 1964. It is found in Amazonas, Brazil.

The wingspan is about 25 mm. The forewings are fuscous with a slight purplish hue and the costa is narrowly light rosy ochreous. There is a dark fuscous dot in the fold at the basal third and a white spot at the end of the cell, edged with dark fuscous. An outwardly curved, transverse row of dark fuscous dots is found at the apical four-fifths. The hindwings are whitish ochreous shaded with grey.
