= Loxotoma elegans =

Scientific classification
- Kingdom: Animalia
- Phylum: Arthropoda
- Clade: Pancrustacea
- Class: Insecta
- Order: Lepidoptera
- Family: Depressariidae
- Genus: Loxotoma
- Species: L. elegans

Binomial name
- Loxotoma elegans Zeller, 1854

Synonyms
- Loxotoma rhodanthes Meyrick, 1915

Species of moth

Loxotoma elegans is a moth in the family Depressariidae. It was described by Philipp Christoph Zeller in 1854. It is found in Guatemala, Honduras, Panama, Colombia, Venezuela, Trinidad, the Guianas, Brazil (Amazonas) and Bolivia.

The wingspan is about 34 mm. The forewings are light yellow brownish with the dorsum slenderly brown and the costal edge rosy brown on the basal and apical fourths. There is a fine brown line from one-fourth of the costa towards two-fifths of the dorsum, but obsolete below the fold. A fine brown curved line is found from two-thirds of the costa to the dorsum before the tornus and there is a fine transverse-linear brown mark on the end of the cell, as well as a triangular black spot on the middle of the costa, its apex rounded and hardly reaching one-fourth across the wing. The termen is slenderly brownish. The hindwings are light crimson rosy.
