= Phylomictis idiotricha =

Scientific classification
- Kingdom: Animalia
- Phylum: Arthropoda
- Class: Insecta
- Order: Lepidoptera
- Family: Depressariidae
- Genus: Phylomictis
- Species: P. idiotricha

Binomial name
- Phylomictis idiotricha Meyrick, 1921

Species of moth

Phylomictis idiotricha is a moth in the family Depressariidae. It was described by Edward Meyrick in 1921. It is found in Australia, where it has been recorded from Queensland.

The wingspan is about 12 millimetres (0.47 in). The forewings are white irregularly mixed and sprinkled dark fuscous and with roundish brownish-grey blotches edged dark fuscous suffusion on the fold before the middle of the wing and in the disc at three-fourths, and a very oblique series of two or three suffused dark fuscous spots from the costa to each of these. A strongly curved subterminal series of similar spots is found near the posterior half of the costa and termen. The hindwings are grey whitish thinly clothed throughout with grey hairs.
