= Parascaeas =

Scientific classification
- Kingdom: Animalia
- Phylum: Arthropoda
- Class: Insecta
- Order: Lepidoptera
- Family: Depressariidae
- Subfamily: Stenomatinae
- Genus: Parascaeas; Meyrick, 1936
- Species: P. uranophanes

Binomial name
- Parascaeas uranophanes (Meyrick, 1931)

Synonyms
- Stenoma uranophanes Meyrick, 1931; Parascaeas cyanolampra Meyrick, 1936

Genus of moths

Parascaeas is a monotypic moth genus in the family Depressariidae. Its only species, Parascaeas uranophanes, is found in Panama and Colombia. Both the genus and species were first described by Edward Meyrick, the genus in 1936 and the species five years earlier in 1931.
