= Baeonoma helotypa =

Scientific classification
- Domain: Eukaryota
- Kingdom: Animalia
- Phylum: Arthropoda
- Class: Insecta
- Order: Lepidoptera
- Family: Depressariidae
- Genus: Baeonoma
- Species: B. helotypa

Binomial name
- Baeonoma helotypa Meyrick, 1916

Species of moth

Baeonoma helotypa is a moth of the family Depressariidae. It is found in French Guiana and Brazil.

The wingspan is 14–18 mm. The forewings are white with some undefined fuscous suffusion towards the dorsum beyond the middle, sometimes forming an irregular suffused dark fuscous blotch in males. There are some scattered fuscous scales on the end of the cell and towards the termen and there is a marginal series of well-marked sometimes connected dark fuscous dots around the apex and termen. The hindwings are grey.
