= Falculina caustopis =

Scientific classification
- Domain: Eukaryota
- Kingdom: Animalia
- Phylum: Arthropoda
- Class: Insecta
- Order: Lepidoptera
- Family: Depressariidae
- Genus: Falculina
- Species: F. caustopis

Binomial name
- Falculina caustopis Meyrick, 1932

Species of moth

Falculina caustopis is a moth in the family Depressariidae. It was described by Edward Meyrick in 1932. It is found in Amazonas, Brazil.

The wingspan is 26–28 mm. The forewings are brown with a faint pinkish tinge. The basal half of the wing is mottled with fuscous scales and the costal edge is fulvous. There is a faint fuscous subterminal line from the middle of the costa to near the termen beneath the apex, then sharply angulated and sinuate to the dorsum before the tornus. There is also a terminal series of fuscous dots. The hindwings are bright yellow basally, with the apical fourth fuscous.
