= Lethata trochalosticta =

Scientific classification
- Domain: Eukaryota
- Kingdom: Animalia
- Phylum: Arthropoda
- Class: Insecta
- Order: Lepidoptera
- Family: Depressariidae
- Genus: Lethata
- Species: L. trochalosticta

Binomial name
- Lethata trochalosticta (Walsingham, 1913)

Synonyms
- Stenoma trochalosticta Walsingham, 1913

Species of moth

Lethata trochalosticta is a moth in the family Depressariidae. It was described by Lord Walsingham in 1913. It is found in Panama and Costa Rica.

The wingspan is about 36 mm. The forewings are olivaceous dark yellowish green, with a slight steely sheen beyond the cell. A reddish brown shade from the middle of the base blends outward and downward with the olivaceous ground colour, changing above to rosy red along the costa to two-thirds. A conspicuous, round, rosy red spot lies at the end of the cell, with a dark fuscous spot in its centre, and a narrow even rim of reddish brown. Just below it, and again above the tornus, is a faint reddish suffusion. The hindwings are ochreous, with a slight fuscous suffusion.
