= Eriogenes nielseni =

Scientific classification
- Domain: Eukaryota
- Kingdom: Animalia
- Phylum: Arthropoda
- Class: Insecta
- Order: Lepidoptera
- Family: Depressariidae
- Genus: Eriogenes
- Species: E. nielseni

Binomial name
- Eriogenes nielseni Edwards, 2003

Species of moth

Eriogenes nielseni is a moth in the family Depressariidae. It was described by Edward David Edwards in 2003. It is found in Australia, where it has been recorded from Queensland.
