= Hyalopseustis =

Scientific classification
- Kingdom: Animalia
- Phylum: Arthropoda
- Clade: Pancrustacea
- Class: Insecta
- Order: Lepidoptera
- Family: Depressariidae
- Subfamily: Stenomatinae
- Genus: Hyalopseustis; Meyrick, 1925
- Species: H. vitrea

Binomial name
- Hyalopseustis vitrea Meyrick, 1925

Genus of moths

Hyalopseustis is a monotypic moth genus in the family Depressariidae. Its only species, Hyalopseustis vitrea, is found in Peru. Both the genus and species were first described by Edward Meyrick in 1925.

The wingspan is 47–53 mm. The forewings are blackish with a broad rather oblique transverse pale blue subhyaline (almost glass-like) fasciate blotch beyond the cell, not quite reaching the costa or tornus, the veins on this black. The hindwings are pale blue subhyaline and the veins black, sometimes rather broadly and suffused together on the basal third. There is a narrow rather irregular oblique black fascia crossing the wing on the end of the cell and continued to the middle of the termen. There is also a moderate black fascia running around the apex and termen to the tornus.

Adults are thought to be mimics of Danainae butterflies.
