= Orphnolechia acridula =

Scientific classification
- Kingdom: Animalia
- Phylum: Arthropoda
- Class: Insecta
- Order: Lepidoptera
- Family: Depressariidae
- Genus: Orphnolechia
- Species: O. acridula

Binomial name
- Orphnolechia acridula (Meyrick, 1918)

Synonyms
- Stenoma acridula Meyrick, 1918

Species of moth

Orphnolechia acridula is a moth of the family Depressariidae first described by Edward Meyrick in 1918. It is found in French Guiana.

The wingspan is about 11 mm for males and about 13 mm for females. The forewings are glossy whitish with a very oblique blackish streak from the base of the costa to the disc at one-fifth and a very oblique blackish streak from one-fifth of the costa reaching halfway across the wing, with a projection on its posterior edge, the lower portion surrounded with some yellow-ochreous suffusion. There are some brownish suffusion and blackish sprinkles on the dorsal area from the base to about the middle, the scale-projection at one-fourth suffused with yellow ochreous, a blotch of blackish sprinkles on the dorsum beyond the middle. There are three irregular blackish spots forming an oblique series from the middle of the costa, reaching halfway across the wing, the two lower sometimes surrounded with yellow-ochreous suffusion. There is also a blackish spot on the costa at four-fifths and some ochreous or brownish suffusion mixed with blackish sprinkles towards the upper part of the termen. Four marginal dots of blackish sprinkles are found on the upper part of the termen. The hindwings are whitish grey.
