= Phylomictis leucopelta =

Scientific classification
- Domain: Eukaryota
- Kingdom: Animalia
- Phylum: Arthropoda
- Class: Insecta
- Order: Lepidoptera
- Family: Depressariidae
- Genus: Phylomictis
- Species: P. leucopelta

Binomial name
- Phylomictis leucopelta (Lower, 1902)

Synonyms
- Comoscotopa leucopelta Lower, 1902

Species of moth

Phylomictis leucopelta is a moth in the family Depressariidae. It was described by Oswald Bertram Lower in 1902. It is found in Australia, where it has been recorded from South Australia.

The wingspan is about 14 mm. The forewings are blackish fuscous, with the extreme costal edge whitish, more pronounced in the middle. There is a large somewhat ovoid whitish basal patch, extending from the base to one-third, but not reaching the dorsum. Some faint whitish scales form two obscure parallel curved series. The hindwings are blackish.
