= Lethata fernandezyepezi =

Scientific classification
- Domain: Eukaryota
- Kingdom: Animalia
- Phylum: Arthropoda
- Class: Insecta
- Order: Lepidoptera
- Family: Depressariidae
- Genus: Lethata
- Species: L. fernandezyepezi

Binomial name
- Lethata fernandezyepezi Duckworth, 1967

Species of moth

Lethata fernandezyepezi is a moth of the family Depressariidae. It is found in Venezuela.

The wingspan is about 27 mm. The forewings are yellow shaded with brown, the costal edge deep ochreous underlined with reddish brown. The dorsum is reddish brown with a reddish-brown area extending from the anal angle to the basal third. There is a fuscous spot in the fold at the basal third and an indistinct spot at the end of the cell, consisting of an irregular ring of reddish-brown scales enclosing a white spot. There is also an outwardly curving transverse line of reddish-brown spots from the costa to the dorsum. The hindwings are grey in the anal area and yellow at the apex.
