= Eriogenes cossoides =

Scientific classification
- Domain: Eukaryota
- Kingdom: Animalia
- Phylum: Arthropoda
- Class: Insecta
- Order: Lepidoptera
- Family: Depressariidae
- Genus: Eriogenes
- Species: E. cossoides

Binomial name
- Eriogenes cossoides (Butler, 1882)

Synonyms
- Phanaca cossoides Butler, 1882; Eriogenes meyricki Duckworth, 1973

Species of moth

Eriogenes cossoides is a moth in the family Depressariidae. It was described by Arthur Gardiner Butler in 1882. It is found on the Moluccas, New Britain and Duke of York Island and in Queensland on mainland Australia.

The wingspan is 29–31 mm. The forewings are silvery white, with the basal two-fifths more or less clouded with red brown, the outer margin of the red-brown area inarched. There is an indistinct curved stripe of the same colour crossing the wing immediately beyond the cell and the costal margin and external border are also red brown. The hindwings are smoky grey, with a white-tipped fringe.
