= Phylomictis sarcinopa =

Scientific classification
- Kingdom: Animalia
- Phylum: Arthropoda
- Class: Insecta
- Order: Lepidoptera
- Family: Depressariidae
- Genus: Phylomictis
- Species: P. sarcinopa

Binomial name
- Phylomictis sarcinopa Meyrick, 1920

Species of moth

Phylomictis sarcinopa is a moth in the family Depressariidae. It was described by Edward Meyrick in 1920. It is found in Australia, where it has been recorded from Queensland.

The wingspan is about 19 mm. The forewings are whitish irrorated grey with the plical and second discal stigmata represented by small pale flesh-colour spots accompanied by a few dark grey scales, a similar somewhat elongate spot in the disc midway between the plical and the base. The first discal stigma is represented by a longitudinal mark of blackish-grey irroration rather obliquely before the plical. There are two or three slight dashes of blackish-grey irroration towards the costa anteriorly, a very oblique series of short longitudinal similar marks tinged ochreous from beneath the costa before the middle to the second discal stigma, and a strongly curved subterminal series of similar marks. The hindwings are grey whitish.
