= Anadasmus incitatrix =

Scientific classification
- Kingdom: Animalia
- Phylum: Arthropoda
- Class: Insecta
- Order: Lepidoptera
- Family: Depressariidae
- Genus: Anadasmus
- Species: A. incitatrix

Binomial name
- Anadasmus incitatrix (Meyrick, 1925)

Synonyms
- Stenoma incitatrix Meyrick, 1925

Species of moth

Anadasmus incitatrix is a moth of the family Depressariidae. It is found in northern Argentina and Paraná, Brazil.

The wingspan is about 28 mm. The forewings are pale pinkish-ochreous with the costal edge ochreous-whitish. The plical and second discal stigmata are dark grey and there is a marginal series of dark grey dots around the apex and termen. The hindwings are ochreous-whitish, tinged greyish-ochreous towards the apex.
