= Eriogenes mesogypsa =

Scientific classification
- Kingdom: Animalia
- Phylum: Arthropoda
- Class: Insecta
- Order: Lepidoptera
- Family: Depressariidae
- Genus: Eriogenes
- Species: E. mesogypsa

Binomial name
- Eriogenes mesogypsa Meyrick, 1925

Species of moth

Eriogenes mesogypsa is a moth in the family Depressariidae. It was described by Edward Meyrick in 1925. It is found in Papua New Guinea and Australia.

The wingspan is 33–35 mm. The forewings are light brownish, more or less irrorated (sprinkled) with darker towards the costa and with an undefined rather broad median fascia of white suffusion, narrower and more distinct on the costa. There is a cloud of fainter white suffusion in the posterior third of the disc, sometimes little indicated. The second discal stigma is obscurely indicated as a darker dot on the posterior edge of the white fascia. The hindwings are pale greyish ochreous.
