= Lethata asthenopa =

Scientific classification
- Kingdom: Animalia
- Phylum: Arthropoda
- Clade: Pancrustacea
- Class: Insecta
- Order: Lepidoptera
- Family: Depressariidae
- Genus: Lethata
- Species: L. asthenopa

Binomial name
- Lethata asthenopa (Meyrick, 1916)

Synonyms
- Stenoma asthenopa Meyrick, 1916

Species of moth

Lethata asthenopa is a moth of the family Depressariidae. It is found in French Guiana.

The wingspan is about 27 mm. The forewings are glossy purplish brown with the costal edge light ochreous rosy and the dorsal edge ferruginous brown from one-third to the tornus. The plical stigma is dark fuscous and the second discal stigma is transverse, whitish and finely dark edged. There is a very faintly indicated darker line from the middle of the costa to three-fifths of the dorsum, strongly curved outwards around the cell. A curved series of undefined blackish dots is found from three-fifths of the costa to four-fifths of the dorsum. The hindwings are grey.
