= Anadasmus capnocrossa =

Scientific classification
- Kingdom: Animalia
- Phylum: Arthropoda
- Class: Insecta
- Order: Lepidoptera
- Family: Depressariidae
- Genus: Anadasmus
- Species: A. capnocrossa

Binomial name
- Anadasmus capnocrossa (Meyrick, 1925)

Synonyms
- Stenoma capnocrossa Meyrick, 1925

Species of moth

Anadasmus capnocrossa is a moth of the family Depressariidae. It is found in Brazil (Amazonas).

The wingspan is about 25 mm. The forewings are light brownish-ochreous with the plical and second discal stigmata very small, dark fuscous. The hindwings are rather dark grey.
