= Anadasmus caliginea =

Scientific classification
- Kingdom: Animalia
- Phylum: Arthropoda
- Class: Insecta
- Order: Lepidoptera
- Family: Depressariidae
- Genus: Anadasmus
- Species: A. caliginea

Binomial name
- Anadasmus caliginea (Meyrick, 1930)

Synonyms
- Stenoma caliginea Meyrick, 1930; Stenoma lianthes Meyrick, 1932

Species of moth

Anadasmus caliginea is a moth in the family Depressariidae. It was described by Edward Meyrick in 1930. It is found in Brazil.
