= Phelotropa oenodes =

Scientific classification
- Kingdom: Animalia
- Phylum: Arthropoda
- Class: Insecta
- Order: Lepidoptera
- Family: Depressariidae
- Genus: Phelotropa
- Species: P. oenodes

Binomial name
- Phelotropa oenodes Meyrick, 1915

Species of moth

Phelotropa oenodes is a moth in the family Depressariidae. It was described by Edward Meyrick in 1915. It is found in Guyana.

The wingspan is about 22 mm. The forewings are fuscous purple with the costal edge pale ochreous from one-fourth to the middle, dark fuscous before and beyond this. The basal area is suffusedly mixed with dark fuscous and a strongly dentate oblique dark fuscous shade crossing the wing about one-third, and an irregular curved shade from three-fifths of the costa to the tornus. The discal stigmata are dark fuscous with a series of small dark fuscous spots around the posterior part of the costa and termen. The hindwings are dark grey.
