= Anadasmus venosella =

Scientific classification
- Kingdom: Animalia
- Phylum: Arthropoda
- Class: Insecta
- Order: Lepidoptera
- Family: Depressariidae
- Genus: Anadasmus
- Species: A. venosella

Binomial name
- Anadasmus venosella (Walker, 1864)

Synonyms
- Cryptolechia venosella Walker, 1864; Stenoma pleximorpha Meyrick, 1930; Stenoma dictyogramma Meyrick, 1932

Species of moth

Anadasmus venosella is a moth in the family Depressariidae. It was described by Francis Walker in 1864. It is found in Amazonas in Brazil and in Bolivia.
