= Anadasmus arenosa =

Scientific classification
- Kingdom: Animalia
- Phylum: Arthropoda
- Class: Insecta
- Order: Lepidoptera
- Family: Depressariidae
- Genus: Anadasmus
- Species: A. arenosa

Binomial name
- Anadasmus arenosa (Meyrick, 1916)

Synonyms
- Stenoma arenosa Meyrick, 1916

Species of moth

Anadasmus arenosa is a moth of the family Depressariidae. It is found in French Guiana.

The wingspan is about 30 mm. The forewings are light ochreous with the plical and second discal stigmata minute and blackish. The hindwings are pale brassy-yellowish.
