= Promenesta chrysampyx =

Scientific classification
- Domain: Eukaryota
- Kingdom: Animalia
- Phylum: Arthropoda
- Class: Insecta
- Order: Lepidoptera
- Family: Depressariidae
- Genus: Promenesta
- Species: P. chrysampyx

Binomial name
- Promenesta chrysampyx Meyrick, 1915

Species of moth

Promenesta chrysampyx is a moth in the family Depressariidae. It was described by Edward Meyrick in 1915. It is found in Guyana, Brazil (Amazonas) and Peru.

The wingspan is about 12 mm. The forewings are dark fuscous, with a faint purplish tinge and a slender deep ochreous-yellow streak along the costa throughout, continued around the termen to the tornus, with its edge slightly waved. The hindwings are dark fuscous.
