= Herbulotiana =

Scientific classification
- Kingdom: Animalia
- Phylum: Arthropoda
- Clade: Pancrustacea
- Class: Insecta
- Order: Lepidoptera
- Family: Depressariidae
- Subfamily: Stenomatinae
- Genus: Herbulotiana; Viette, 1954

Type species
- Herbulotiana abceda Viette, 1954

Genus of moths

Herbulotiana is a genus of moths of the family Depressariidae from Madagascar.

== Species ==
Species of this genus are:

- Herbulotiana abceda Viette, 1954
- Herbulotiana altitudinella Viette, 1963
- Herbulotiana atypicella Viette, 1956
- Herbulotiana benoistella Viette, 1954
- Herbulotiana bernardiiella Viette, 1954
- Herbulotiana bicolorata Viette, 1954
- Herbulotiana catalaella Viette, 1954
- Herbulotiana collectella Viette, 1956
- Herbulotiana halarcta (Meyrick, 1917)
- Herbulotiana longifascia Viette, 1954
- Herbulotiana paulianella Viette, 1954
- Herbulotiana robustella Viette, 1956
- Herbulotiana rungsella Viette, 1954
- Herbulotiana septella Viette, 1956
- Herbulotiana vadonella Viette, 1956
- Herbulotiana violacea Viette, 1954
- Herbulotiana zorobella Viette, 1988

== See also ==
- List of moths of Madagascar
