= Baeonoma euphanes =

Scientific classification
- Kingdom: Animalia
- Phylum: Arthropoda
- Clade: Pancrustacea
- Class: Insecta
- Order: Lepidoptera
- Family: Depressariidae
- Genus: Baeonoma
- Species: B. euphanes

Binomial name
- Baeonoma euphanes Meyrick, 1916

Species of moth

Baeonoma euphanes is a moth of the family Depressariidae. It is found in French Guiana.

The wingspan is 9–10 mm. The forewings are dark fuscous with a short white mark on the base of the dorsum and a triangular white blotch on the dorsum beyond the middle, reaching half across the wing. The apex is narrowly white. The hindwings are rather dark grey, thinly scaled in the disc.
