= Lethata irresoluta =

Scientific classification
- Domain: Eukaryota
- Kingdom: Animalia
- Phylum: Arthropoda
- Class: Insecta
- Order: Lepidoptera
- Family: Depressariidae
- Genus: Lethata
- Species: L. irresoluta

Binomial name
- Lethata irresoluta Duckworth, 1967

Species of moth

Lethata irresoluta is a moth of the family Depressariidae. It is found in Peru.

The wingspan is about 30 mm. The forewings are fulvous with the costa narrowly deep ochreous underlined with purplish from the base to the apical three-fourths and from the apical three-fourths to the tornus deep yellow. The dorsum is irregularly edged with grey and there is a purplish spot at the end of the cell. The hindwings are whitish.
