= Mothonica ocellea =

Scientific classification
- Kingdom: Animalia
- Phylum: Arthropoda
- Clade: Pancrustacea
- Class: Insecta
- Order: Lepidoptera
- Family: Depressariidae
- Genus: Mothonica
- Species: M. ocellea

Binomial name
- Mothonica ocellea Forbes, 1930

Synonyms
- Mothonodes ocellea; Stenoma ocellea

Species of moth

Mothonica ocellea is a moth of the family Depressariidae. It is found in Guatemala, Cuba and Puerto Rico.

The larvae feed within the fruit of Talisia svensoni.
