= Anadasmus =

Scientific classification
- Domain: Eukaryota
- Kingdom: Animalia
- Phylum: Arthropoda
- Class: Insecta
- Order: Lepidoptera
- Family: Depressariidae
- Subfamily: Stenomatinae
- Genus: Anadasmus; Walsingham, 1897

Genus of moths

Anadasmus is a genus of moths in the subfamily Stenomatinae.

== Species ==
- Anadasmus accurata (Meyrick, 1916)
- Anadasmus anceps (Butler, 1877)
- Anadasmus arenosa (Meyrick, 1916)
- Anadasmus byrsinitis (Meyrick, 1912)
- Anadasmus caliginea (Meyrick, 1930)
- Anadasmus capnocrossa (Meyrick, 1925)
- Anadasmus chlorotrota (Meyrick, 1932)
- Anadasmus endochra (Meyrick, 1925)
- Anadasmus germinans (Meyrick, 1925)
- Anadasmus incitatrix (Meyrick, 1925)
- Anadasmus ischioptila (Meyrick, 1925)
- Anadasmus leontodes (Meyrick, 1915)
- Anadasmus lithogypsa (Meyrick, 1932)
- Anadasmus nonagriella (Walker, 1864)
- Anadasmus obmutescens (Meyrick, 1916)
- Anadasmus paurocentra (Meyrick, 1912)
- Anadasmus pelinitis (Meyrick, 1912)
- Anadasmus pelodes (Walsingham, 1913)
- Anadasmus plebicola (Meyrick, 1918)
- Anadasmus quadratella (Walker, 1864)
- Anadasmus sororia (Zeller, 1877)
- Anadasmus vacans (Meyrick, 1916)
- Anadasmus venosella (Walker, 1864)
