= Anadasmus accurata =

Scientific classification
- Kingdom: Animalia
- Phylum: Arthropoda
- Class: Insecta
- Order: Lepidoptera
- Family: Depressariidae
- Genus: Anadasmus
- Species: A. accurata

Binomial name
- Anadasmus accurata (Meyrick, 1916)

Synonyms
- Stenoma accurata Meyrick, 1916; Stenoma perjura Meyrick, 1925

Species of moth

Anadasmus accurata is a moth of the family Depressariidae. It is found in French Guiana and Brazil (Amazonas).

The wingspan is 19–20 mm. The forewings are whitish lilac-grey with the costal edge white. The plical and second discal stigmata are dark fuscous and there is a faint very irregular grey postmedian line, as well as a cloudy grey line from four-fifths of the costa to the dorsum before the tornus, sinuate inwards beneath the costa, then moderately curved. There is a marginal row of dark fuscous dots around the apex and termen. The hindwings are whitish-grey, becoming whitish towards the base.
