= Thioscelis lipara =

Scientific classification
- Kingdom: Animalia
- Phylum: Arthropoda
- Class: Insecta
- Order: Lepidoptera
- Family: Depressariidae
- Genus: Thioscelis
- Species: T. lipara

Binomial name
- Thioscelis lipara Duckworth, 1967

Species of moth

Thioscelis lipara is a moth in the family Depressariidae. It was described by W. Donald Duckworth in 1967. It is found in Amazonas, Brazil.

The wingspan is about 53 mm. The forewings are ochreous, overlaid with light brown and with a small, distinct S-shaped black spot on the median third near the costa surrounded by a small patch of ill-defined black dots. The transverse subterminal and terminal lines are complete (rather than composed of dots) and only slightly curved. The hindwings are ochreous lightly overlaid with grey.
