= Promenesta marginella =

Scientific classification
- Domain: Eukaryota
- Kingdom: Animalia
- Phylum: Arthropoda
- Class: Insecta
- Order: Lepidoptera
- Family: Depressariidae
- Genus: Promenesta
- Species: P. marginella

Binomial name
- Promenesta marginella Busck, 1914

Species of moth

Promenesta marginella is a moth in the family Depressariidae. It was described by August Busck in 1914. It is found in Panama.

The wingspan is about 10 mm. The forewings are dark olive brown with the costal, apical, and terminal edges narrowly bright saffron yellow. Just before the terminal edge is a marginal series of black dots. The hindwings are dark fuscous.
