= Zetesima portentosa =

Scientific classification
- Domain: Eukaryota
- Kingdom: Animalia
- Phylum: Arthropoda
- Class: Insecta
- Order: Lepidoptera
- Family: Depressariidae
- Genus: Zetesima
- Species: Z. portentosa

Binomial name
- Zetesima portentosa Busck, 1914

Species of moth

Zetesima portentosa is a moth in the family Depressariidae. It was described by August Busck in 1914. It is found in Panama.

The wingspan is about 16 mm. The forewings are dark brown with obscure, blackish brown markings and with light ochreous costal and terminal edges. There is a strong costal fold reaching nearly to the middle of the wing, which contains a cluster of long, broad, iridescent scales and there is a round black dot at the end of the cilia, edged by ochreous scales. A black, ill-defined streak is found on the outer and upper edge of the cell and there is a series of ill-defined, black, marginal spots around the costal, apical, and terminal edges. The hindwings are blackish brown with a light ochreous costal space covered by the forewings.
