= Promenesta haplodoxa =

Scientific classification
- Domain: Eukaryota
- Kingdom: Animalia
- Phylum: Arthropoda
- Class: Insecta
- Order: Lepidoptera
- Family: Depressariidae
- Genus: Promenesta
- Species: P. haplodoxa

Binomial name
- Promenesta haplodoxa Meyrick, 1925

Species of moth

Promenesta haplodoxa is a moth in the family Depressariidae. It was described by Edward Meyrick in 1925. It is found in Brazil (Amazonas).

The wingspan is about 12 mm. The forewings are light brownish ochreous and the hindwings are rather dark grey.
