= Baeonoma holarga =

Scientific classification
- Domain: Eukaryota
- Kingdom: Animalia
- Phylum: Arthropoda
- Class: Insecta
- Order: Lepidoptera
- Family: Depressariidae
- Genus: Baeonoma
- Species: B. holarga

Binomial name
- Baeonoma holarga Meyrick, 1916

Species of moth

Baeonoma holarga is a moth of the family Depressariidae. It is found in French Guiana.

The wingspan is about 19 mm. The forewings are white and the hindwings are light grey.
