= Lethata angusta =

Scientific classification
- Kingdom: Animalia
- Phylum: Arthropoda
- Clade: Pancrustacea
- Class: Insecta
- Order: Lepidoptera
- Family: Depressariidae
- Genus: Lethata
- Species: L. angusta

Binomial name
- Lethata angusta Duckworth, 1967

Species of moth

Lethata angusta is a moth of the family Depressariidae. It is found in Paraná, Brazil.

The wingspan is about 28 mm. The forewings are ochreous overcast with brown and with the costa narrowly brick red. There is a faint brownish spot on the costa at midpoint and a spot at the end of the cell consisting of an irregular patch of purplish scales. The terminal line is brown. The hindwings are whitish overcast with grey.
