= Lethata lanosa =

Scientific classification
- Domain: Eukaryota
- Kingdom: Animalia
- Phylum: Arthropoda
- Class: Insecta
- Order: Lepidoptera
- Family: Depressariidae
- Genus: Lethata
- Species: L. lanosa

Binomial name
- Lethata lanosa Duckworth, 1967

Species of moth

Lethata lanosa is a moth of the family Depressariidae. It is found in Panama.

The wingspan is about 24 mm. The forewings are brown with the costal edge narrowly deep ochreous and with an indistinct fuscous hue obliquely from the anal angle to the costa at midpoint. The dorsal edge is narrowly fuscous and there is a spot at the end of the cell consisting of a fuscous ring enclosing a brown spot. There is also an outwardly curved transverse faint fuscous line at the apical fourth. The hindwings are fuscous.
