= Lethata glaucopa =

Scientific classification
- Domain: Eukaryota
- Kingdom: Animalia
- Phylum: Arthropoda
- Class: Insecta
- Order: Lepidoptera
- Family: Depressariidae
- Genus: Lethata
- Species: L. glaucopa

Binomial name
- Lethata glaucopa (Meyrick, 1912)

Synonyms
- Stenoma glaucopa Meyrick, 1912

Species of moth

Lethata glaucopa is a moth of the family Depressariidae. It is found in Colombia.

The wingspan is about 38 mm. The forewings are ferruginous brown, orange tinged towards the costa anteriorly and with the costal edge crimson, becoming ferruginous posteriorly. The second discal stigma is large, round and whitish, centered with dark grey. The hindwings are grey.
