= Mysaromima =

Scientific classification
- Kingdom: Animalia
- Phylum: Arthropoda
- Class: Insecta
- Order: Lepidoptera
- Family: Depressariidae
- Subfamily: Stenomatinae
- Genus: Mysaromima; Meyrick, 1926
- Species: M. liquescens

Binomial name
- Mysaromima liquescens Meyrick, 1926

Synonyms
- Mysaromina

Genus of moths

Mysaromima liquescens is a moth of the family Depressariidae. It is found in Colombia and Brazil (Mato Grosso).

The wingspan is about 40 mm. The forewings are glossy white with a blotch of greyish-ochreous and bluish-fuscous suffusion on the dorsum near the base and a glossy light iridescent-bronzy-grey oval patch occupying the cell from one-fourth of the wing, surrounded above and posteriorly with greenish suffusion mixed grey, and including a similar round spot beyond the middle, beneath this is lighter grey suffusion to the fold, and beyond it wider pale yellow-greyish suffusion extended down to before the tornus. In this, beyond the cell, is an irregular shining milk-white raised transverse striga, two similar dots obliquely placed before and above it, and two short fine nearly parallel lines beneath the median portion of the patch, the anterior extremity of the lower bent down. The posterior fourth of the costa is suffused light yellow-greyish. The hindwings are pale ochreous-yellowish, somewhat deeper towards the apex.

The larvae feed on Schizolobium parahyba var. amazonicum.
