= Anadasmus ischioptila =

Scientific classification
- Kingdom: Animalia
- Phylum: Arthropoda
- Class: Insecta
- Order: Lepidoptera
- Family: Depressariidae
- Genus: Anadasmus
- Species: A. ischioptila

Binomial name
- Anadasmus ischioptila (Meyrick, 1925)

Synonyms
- Stenoma ischioptila Meyrick, 1925

Species of moth

Anadasmus ischioptila is a moth of the family Depressariidae. It is found in Colombia and Panama.

The wingspan is about 30 mm. The forewings are rather light fuscous with the extreme costal edge ochreous-white. The plical and second discal stigmata are blackish. There is a faintly indicated hardly curved darker shade from the middle of the costa just beyond the second discal stigma to the dorsum at two-thirds and a curved subterminal series of faint cloudy greyish dots sinuate towards the costa. There is also a marginal series of blackish dots around the apex and termen. The hindwings are dark grey with an expansible whitish subcostal hairpencil from the base to the middle (with the costal area not expanded).

The larvae feed on the leaves of Persea gratissima.
