= Anadasmus endochra =

Scientific classification
- Kingdom: Animalia
- Phylum: Arthropoda
- Class: Insecta
- Order: Lepidoptera
- Family: Depressariidae
- Genus: Anadasmus
- Species: A. endochra

Binomial name
- Anadasmus endochra (Meyrick, 1925)

Synonyms
- Stenoma endochra Meyrick, 1925

Species of moth

Anadasmus endochra is a moth of the family Depressariidae. It is found in Brazil (Amazonas).

The wingspan is about 25 mm. The forewings are fuscous with the basal third brownish-ochreous, the edge curved and rather irregular. There is a suffused pale brownish-ochreous dot on the end of the cell. The hindwings are dark grey.
