= Promenesta capnocoma =

Scientific classification
- Kingdom: Animalia
- Phylum: Arthropoda
- Clade: Pancrustacea
- Class: Insecta
- Order: Lepidoptera
- Family: Depressariidae
- Genus: Promenesta
- Species: P. capnocoma

Binomial name
- Promenesta capnocoma (Meyrick, 1931)

Synonyms
- Stenoma capnocoma Meyrick, 1931

Species of moth

Promenesta capnocoma is a moth in the family Depressariidae. It was described by Edward Meyrick in 1931. It is found in Brazil.

The wingspan is about 14 mm.
