= Phylomictis decretoria =

Scientific classification
- Domain: Eukaryota
- Kingdom: Animalia
- Phylum: Arthropoda
- Class: Insecta
- Order: Lepidoptera
- Family: Depressariidae
- Genus: Phylomictis
- Species: P. decretoria

Binomial name
- Phylomictis decretoria T. P. Lucas, 1900

Species of moth

Phylomictis decretoria is a moth in the family Depressariidae. It was described by Thomas Pennington Lucas in 1900. It is found in Australia, where it has been recorded from Queensland.

The wingspan is about 16 mm. The forewings are creamy ochreous with reddish-fuscous markings, and white between veins. There is a pink border along the middle third of the costa and a median longitudinal band of deep red fuscous along the wing to the end of the cell, where it bifurcates, and along its whole course gives off linear branches to the costa and hindmargin, and is thickened toward the inner margin by two longitudinal short bands which give off branches to the inner margin. The branches are given off as fine lines, and thicken proportionately as they approach either border. Between the radiated lines, the spaces are white. The inner border is suffused with fuscous, and the whole wing more or less tinted with pink. The hindwings are light ochreous grey.
