= Anadasmus anceps =

Scientific classification
- Domain: Eukaryota
- Kingdom: Animalia
- Phylum: Arthropoda
- Class: Insecta
- Order: Lepidoptera
- Family: Depressariidae
- Genus: Anadasmus
- Species: A. anceps

Binomial name
- Anadasmus anceps (Butler, 1877)

Synonyms
- Cryptolechia anceps Butler, 1877; Stenoma praeceps Meyrick, 1915

Species of moth

Anadasmus anceps is a moth of the family Depressariidae. It is found in Brazil (Para) and French Guiana.

The wingspan is about 24 mm. The forewings are very pale whitish-fuscous with the extreme costal edge whitish. The stigmata are dark fuscous, the plical very obliquely beyond the first discal. There are two series of cloudy fuscous dots, the first from above the cell in the middle of the wing to beyond the second discal stigma, then obtusely angulated and continued nearly directly to near the dorsum at three-fourths, the second from the costa at four-fifths to the dorsum before the tornus, strongly indented beneath the costa, then rather strongly curved. There is a series of dark fuscous marginal dots around the apex and termen. The hindwings are ochreous-whitish.
