= Catarata stenota =

Scientific classification
- Domain: Eukaryota
- Kingdom: Animalia
- Phylum: Arthropoda
- Class: Insecta
- Order: Lepidoptera
- Family: Depressariidae
- Genus: Catarata
- Species: C. stenota

Binomial name
- Catarata stenota Walsingham, 1912

Species of moth

Catarata stenota is a moth in the family Depressariidae. It was described by Walsingham in 1912. It is found in Guatemala.

The wingspan is about 16 mm. The forewings are stone-whitish, profusely sprinkled and shaded with fuscous, a blackish spot of raised scales on the nexus, above which the dark fuscous colouring is slightly concentrated in an ill-defined half-fascia, reaching from the costa to the fold, and produced outward along the costa to an even more concentrated patch of the same colour, connecting the costa with the outer end of the cell, and then again diffused upward to above the apex; a waved line parallel with the termen is faintly indicated, the marginal spots on the termen and the basal half of the otherwise stone-white cilia being somewhat darker than the wing-suffusion. Briefly, the wing-surface has an irregular and confusedly mottled appearance. The hindwings are pale brownish grey, with a brownish shade along the basal half of the hoary white cilia.
