= Rhodanassa =

Scientific classification
- Kingdom: Animalia
- Phylum: Arthropoda
- Clade: Pancrustacea
- Class: Insecta
- Order: Lepidoptera
- Family: Depressariidae
- Subfamily: Stenomatinae
- Genus: Rhodanassa; Meyrick, 1915
- Species: R. io

Binomial name
- Rhodanassa io (Busck, 1911)

Synonyms
- Stenoma io Busck, 1911; Rhodanassa callimnestra Meyrick, 1915

Genus of moths

Rhodanassa io is a moth of the family Depressariidae and the only species in the genus Rhodanassa. It is found in French Guiana.

The wingspan is about 37 mm (1.5 in). The forewings are glossy lilac-purple, the apical area beyond an undefined line from two-thirds of the costa to the tornus purplish-brown, the costa suffused with darker brown throughout. There is a grey-whitish quadrangular spot in the disc before the middle, a small oval black spot centred with brown-whitish and ringed with grey-whitish on the fold somewhat beyond this, and a rather large quadrangular black spot edged with grey-whitish and including a fine whitish line parallel to its posterior edge in the disc beyond the middle. There is a hardly perceptible faintly darker sinuate line from four-fifths of the costa to the tornus. The hindwings are bright deep rose. The forewings beneath have an elongate discal patch of light brassy-ochreous modified scales, extending over the upper part of the cell and above its margin from before the middle to the end, occupying about one-fourth of the width of the wing.
