= Aproopta =

Scientific classification
- Kingdom: Animalia
- Phylum: Arthropoda
- Class: Insecta
- Order: Lepidoptera
- Family: Depressariidae
- Subfamily: Stenomatinae
- Genus: Aproopta; Turner, 1919
- Species: A. melanchlaena

Binomial name
- Aproopta melanchlaena Turner, 1919

Genus of moths

Aproopta melanchlaena is a moth in the family Depressariidae, and the only species in the genus Aproopta. It was described by Turner in 1919. It is found in Australia, where it has been recorded from New South Wales.

The wingspan is about 24 mm. The forewings are blackish, towards the termen with a slight whitish admixture. The hindwings are pale-grey.
