= Anadasmus paurocentra =

Scientific classification
- Kingdom: Animalia
- Phylum: Arthropoda
- Class: Insecta
- Order: Lepidoptera
- Family: Depressariidae
- Genus: Anadasmus
- Species: A. paurocentra

Binomial name
- Anadasmus paurocentra (Meyrick, 1912)

Synonyms
- Stenoma paurocentra Meyrick, 1912

Species of moth

Anadasmus paurocentra is a moth of the family Depressariidae. It is found in Colombia.

The wingspan is 28–34 mm. The forewings are light brownish-ochreous with the costal edge yellow-whitish and the plical and second discal stigmata blackish. There is a curved subterminal series of dots indicated by two or three blackish scales each, not reaching either margin. The hindwings are whitish-fuscous.
