= Lethata oculosa =

Scientific classification
- Domain: Eukaryota
- Kingdom: Animalia
- Phylum: Arthropoda
- Class: Insecta
- Order: Lepidoptera
- Family: Depressariidae
- Genus: Lethata
- Species: L. oculosa

Binomial name
- Lethata oculosa Duckworth, 1967

Species of moth

Lethata oculosa is a moth of the family Depressariidae. It is found in São Paulo, Brazil.

The wingspan is about 28 mm. The forewings are greyish brown with the costal edge light ochreous. There is deep brown suffusion from the anal angle over the basal third and a spot at the end of the cell consisting of a ring of deep brown enclosing whitish scales with a dot of deep brown in the center. There is also an indistinct outwardly curving deep brown transverse line from the costa to the dorsum at the apical two-thirds. The hindwings are grey.
