= Baeonoma suavis =

Scientific classification
- Domain: Eukaryota
- Kingdom: Animalia
- Phylum: Arthropoda
- Class: Insecta
- Order: Lepidoptera
- Family: Depressariidae
- Genus: Baeonoma
- Species: B. suavis

Binomial name
- Baeonoma suavis Meyrick, 1916

Species of moth

Baeonoma suavis is a moth of the family Depressariidae. It is found in French Guiana.

The wingspan is about 15 mm. The forewings are light yellow-ochreous, yellower towards the costa, tinged with violet-brownish towards the dorsum, with a few scattered fuscous specks, the costal edge whitish. There is a fuscous transverse mark on the end of the cell. The hindwings are dark grey.
