= Falculina lepidota =

Scientific classification
- Kingdom: Animalia
- Phylum: Arthropoda
- Class: Insecta
- Order: Lepidoptera
- Family: Depressariidae
- Genus: Falculina
- Species: F. lepidota

Binomial name
- Falculina lepidota Meyrick, 1916

Species of moth

Falculina lepidota is a moth of the family Depressariidae. It is found in French Guiana.

The wingspan is 28–29 mm for males and about 36 mm for females. The forewings are light brownish, paler or suffused with pale greyish-ochreous towards the base of the costa and with the costal edge ferruginous or brownish-ochreous. The cell and anterior half of the dorsal area are strewn with small cloudy suffused blackish spots and there is a series of indistinct blackish minute strigulae or dots from above the end of the cell towards the middle of the termen, then angulated and incurved to the dorsum before the tornus. There is also a terminal series of cloudy blackish dots. The hindwings are dark fuscous in males, with the modified scales of the lower margin of the cell and an area beneath this lighter and fuscous, with the apical edge tinged with ochreous. The hindwings of the females are ochreous-yellow, with the basal half pale grey.
