= Energia (moth) =

Scientific classification
- Domain: Eukaryota
- Kingdom: Animalia
- Phylum: Arthropoda
- Class: Insecta
- Order: Lepidoptera
- Family: Depressariidae
- Subfamily: Stenomatinae
- Genus: Energia; Walsingham, 1912

Genus of moths

Energia is a moth genus of the family Depressariidae.

== Species ==
- Energia inopina Walsingham, 1912
- Energia subversa Walsingham, 1912
