= Menestomorpha =

Scientific classification
- Kingdom: Animalia
- Phylum: Arthropoda
- Class: Insecta
- Order: Lepidoptera
- Family: Depressariidae
- Subfamily: Stenomatinae
- Genus: Menestomorpha; Walsingham, 1907

Genus of moths

Menestomorpha is a moth genus of the family Depressariidae.

== Species ==
- Menestomorpha kimballi (Duckworth, 1964)
- Menestomorpha oblongata Walsingham, 1907
