= Anadasmus nonagriella =

Scientific classification
- Kingdom: Animalia
- Phylum: Arthropoda
- Class: Insecta
- Order: Lepidoptera
- Family: Depressariidae
- Genus: Anadasmus
- Species: A. nonagriella

Binomial name
- Anadasmus nonagriella (Walker, 1864)

Synonyms
- Cryptolechia nonagriella Walker, 1864

Species of moth

Anadasmus nonagriella is a moth in the family Depressariidae. It was described by Francis Walker in 1864. It is found in Panama, Peru, French Guiana and Amazonas, Brazil.

Adults are pale fawn coloured, the forewings with three black points in the disc, one before the middle, the second beyond the middle and the third elongate, a little beyond the first, and much nearer the interior border. There is a deeply outward curved submarginal line composed of elongated black points and the marginal points are black. The costa is slightly convex along half the length from the base and the exterior border is convex and hardly oblique. The hindwings are brownish.
