= Lethata leucothea =

Scientific classification
- Domain: Eukaryota
- Kingdom: Animalia
- Phylum: Arthropoda
- Class: Insecta
- Order: Lepidoptera
- Family: Depressariidae
- Genus: Lethata
- Species: L. leucothea

Binomial name
- Lethata leucothea (Busck, 1914)

Synonyms
- Stenoma leucothea Busck, 1914

Species of moth

Lethata leucothea is a moth in the family Depressariidae. It was described by August Busck in 1914. It is found in Panama.

The wingspan is about 20 mm. The forewings are pale ochreous grey, the costal edge narrowly bright terra cotta and the dorsal edge narrowly bright ochreous brown. There is a large, oval, light yellow spot at the end of the cell, the edged posteriorly with dark ochreous. An outwardly curved transverse row of small blackish brown dots is found from the apical third of the costa across the wing and a similar, parallel, but fainter and not so complete, row of dark brown scales runs from the middle of the costa, touching the yellow spot. A still fainter and less complete line of dots is found at the basal third. The hindwings are light ochreous fuscous.
