= Phylomictis eclecta =

Scientific classification
- Kingdom: Animalia
- Phylum: Arthropoda
- Clade: Pancrustacea
- Class: Insecta
- Order: Lepidoptera
- Family: Depressariidae
- Genus: Phylomictis
- Species: P. eclecta

Binomial name
- Phylomictis eclecta Turner, 1906

Species of moth

Phylomictis eclecta is a moth in the family Depressariidae. It was first described by Alfred Jefferis Turner in 1906. It is found in Australia, where it has been recorded from Queensland.

The wingspan is about 18 mm. The forewings are white finely irrorated with grey and with a large oval grey spot on the dorsum at one-fourth. The hindwings are grey.
