= Orphnolechia neastra =

Scientific classification
- Kingdom: Animalia
- Phylum: Arthropoda
- Class: Insecta
- Order: Lepidoptera
- Family: Depressariidae
- Genus: Orphnolechia
- Species: O. neastra

Binomial name
- Orphnolechia neastra (Meyrick, 1915)

Synonyms
- Stenoma neastra Meyrick, 1915

Species of moth

Orphnolechia neastra is a moth in the family Depressariidae. It was described by Edward Meyrick in 1915. It is found in Guyana.

The wingspan is about 11 mm. The forewings are purple blackish with a white line from the middle of the costa to three-fifths of the dorsum, somewhat angulated in the middle. The hindwings are dark fuscous becoming blackish posteriorly. There is a moderate irregular white spot in the disc beyond the middle.
