= Promenesta =

Scientific classification
- Domain: Eukaryota
- Kingdom: Animalia
- Phylum: Arthropoda
- Class: Insecta
- Order: Lepidoptera
- Family: Depressariidae
- Subfamily: Stenomatinae
- Genus: Promenesta; Busck, 1914

Genus of moths

Promenesta is a moth genus of the family Depressariidae. It is endemic to South America.

== Species ==
- Promenesta autampyx Meyrick, 1925
- Promenesta callichlora Meyrick, 1915
- Promenesta capnocoma (Meyrick, 1931)
- Promenesta chrysampyx Meyrick, 1915
- Promenesta haplodoxa Meyrick, 1925
- Promenesta isotrocha Meyrick, 1918
- Promenesta leucomias Meyrick, 1925
- Promenesta lithochroma Busck, 1914
- Promenesta marginella Busck, 1914
- Promenesta solella (Walker, 1864)
- Promenesta triacmopa (Meyrick, 1931)
