= Anadasmus sororia =

Scientific classification
- Kingdom: Animalia
- Phylum: Arthropoda
- Clade: Pancrustacea
- Class: Insecta
- Order: Lepidoptera
- Family: Depressariidae
- Genus: Anadasmus
- Species: A. sororia

Binomial name
- Anadasmus sororia (Zeller, 1877)

Synonyms
- Cryptolechia sororia Zeller, 1877; Stenoma catapsecta Meyrick, 1915

Species of moth

Anadasmus sororia is a moth of the family Depressariidae. It is found in Mexico, Guatemala, Panama, Colombia and Guyana.

The wingspan is about 26 mm. The forewings are very pale grey or whitish-fuscous with the extreme costal edge is whitish. The stigmata are blackish, the plical very obliquely beyond the first discal and there are two transverse series of dark grey dots, the first from beneath the costa at two-fifths very obliquely outwards, sinuate-curved around in the disc at three-fourths to beneath the origin of vein 2, then towards two-thirds of the dorsum, the second from four-fifths of the costa to the dorsum before the tornus, rather strongly sinuate inwards beneath the costa, then rather strongly curved outwards. There is a marginal series of black dots around the apex and termen. The hindwings are whitish-grey.
