= Lethata myopina =

Scientific classification
- Kingdom: Animalia
- Phylum: Arthropoda
- Clade: Pancrustacea
- Class: Insecta
- Order: Lepidoptera
- Family: Depressariidae
- Genus: Lethata
- Species: L. myopina

Binomial name
- Lethata myopina (Zeller, 1877)

Synonyms
- Cryptolechia myopina Zeller, 1877

Species of moth

Lethata myopina is a moth of the family Depressariidae. It is found in Brazil.

The wingspan is about 24 mm. The forewings are yellow with the costal edge faintly shaded with rose. The dorsal edge is rosy ochreous from the basal angle to the apical three-fourths. There is a spot at the end of the cell composed of a ring of rosy ochreous enclosing a white spot. The hindwings are whitish.
