= Mothonica periapta =

Scientific classification
- Kingdom: Animalia
- Phylum: Arthropoda
- Class: Insecta
- Order: Lepidoptera
- Family: Depressariidae
- Genus: Mothonica
- Species: M. periapta

Binomial name
- Mothonica periapta Walsingham, 1912

Species of moth

Mothonica periapta is a moth in the family Depressariidae. It was described by Thomas de Grey, 6th Baron Walsingham, in 1912. It is found in Costa Rica.

The wingspan is about 19 mm. The forewings are bone-ochreous, sprinkled with brownish fuscous scales, which are chiefly distributed in horse-shoe form around the outer end of the cell, reverting to the costa and dorsum at or before the middle and tending to radiate outward on the lines of the neuration. An outwardly waved series of spots lies beyond this shade, annulate below the costa, bowed in the middle and sloped backward to the dorsum before the tornus. There are two strong discal spots, one before the middle, the other at the end, of the cell, with a plical spot nearer to the first. There is also a series of six well-marked spots along the termen, at the base of the bone-ochreous cilia which are tipped with whitish. The hindwings are bone-whitish, with a slight brownish tinge.
