= Promenesta isotrocha =

Scientific classification
- Domain: Eukaryota
- Kingdom: Animalia
- Phylum: Arthropoda
- Class: Insecta
- Order: Lepidoptera
- Family: Depressariidae
- Genus: Promenesta
- Species: P. isotrocha

Binomial name
- Promenesta isotrocha Meyrick, 1918

Species of moth

Promenesta isotrocha is a moth in the family Depressariidae. It was described by Edward Meyrick in 1918. It is found in Argentina.

The wingspan is about 16 mm. The forewings are light yellow, with the second discal stigma small and grey. The hindwings are pale ochreous-yellowish.
