= Energia inopina =

Scientific classification
- Domain: Eukaryota
- Kingdom: Animalia
- Phylum: Arthropoda
- Class: Insecta
- Order: Lepidoptera
- Family: Depressariidae
- Genus: Energia
- Species: E. inopina

Binomial name
- Energia inopina Walsingham, 1912

Species of moth

Energia inopina is a moth in the family Depressariidae. It was described by Thomas de Grey in 1912. It is found in Panama.

The wingspan is about 20 mm. The forewings are whitish ochreous, with blackish costal spots, and a strong ferruginous brown shade extending over the whole dorsal half and touching the upper edge of the cell on its outer third. There is a short black line at the extreme base, with a longer one below it, the latter extending straight along the fold to half the wing-length. The costal spots consist of one, small, at one-fifth from the base, two larger patches on either side of the middle of the costa, which is slightly depressed, these are separated and partly limited beneath by a patch of snow-white scales, mixed with others corresponding to the costal patches. Two or three small, dark brown costal spots before the apex are less conspicuous than those that precede them. The hindwings are brownish grey.
