= Anadasmus pelodes =

Scientific classification
- Domain: Eukaryota
- Kingdom: Animalia
- Phylum: Arthropoda
- Class: Insecta
- Order: Lepidoptera
- Family: Depressariidae
- Genus: Anadasmus
- Species: A. pelodes

Binomial name
- Anadasmus pelodes (Walsingham, 1913)

Synonyms
- Stenoma pelodes Walsingham, 1913; Stenoma scortea Meyrick, 1915

Species of moth

Anadasmus pelodes is a moth of the family Depressariidae. It is found in Mexico, Panama, Guyana and Brazil (Amazonas).

The wingspan is 25–26 mm. The forewings are light brownish, faintly purplish-tinged and with the extreme costal edge ochreous-whitish. The plical and second discal stigmata are small and dark fuscous and there is a series of faint cloudy fuscous dots from four-fifths of the costa to the dorsum before the tornus, rather curved outwards in the disc. A marginal series of cloudy dark fuscous dots is found around the apex and termen. The hindwings are rather dark grey.
