= Anadasmus byrsinitis =

Scientific classification
- Kingdom: Animalia
- Phylum: Arthropoda
- Class: Insecta
- Order: Lepidoptera
- Family: Depressariidae
- Genus: Anadasmus
- Species: A. byrsinitis

Binomial name
- Anadasmus byrsinitis (Meyrick, 1912)

Synonyms
- Stenoma byrsinitis Meyrick, 1912

Species of moth

Anadasmus byrsinitis is a moth of the family Depressariidae. It is found in Colombia.

The wingspan is 25–30 mm. The forewings are greyish-ochreous or pale fuscous in males, paler suffused before the subterminal line. The forewings of the females are fuscous, somewhat sprinkled with dark fuscous. The costal edge is ochreous-whitish and the stigmata are dark fuscous, the plical rather obliquely beyond the first discal. There is a rather curved cloudy dark fuscous transverse shade passing behind the second discal. A curved series of cloudy dark fuscous lunulate marks is found from four-fifths of the costa to the dorsum before the tornus and there is a series of blackish dots around the apex and termen. The hindwings are grey, rather darker in females.
