= Lethata monopa =

Scientific classification
- Domain: Eukaryota
- Kingdom: Animalia
- Phylum: Arthropoda
- Class: Insecta
- Order: Lepidoptera
- Family: Depressariidae
- Genus: Lethata
- Species: L. monopa

Binomial name
- Lethata monopa Duckworth, 1967

Species of moth

Lethata monopa is a moth of the family Depressariidae. It is found in Rio de Janeiro, Brazil.

The wingspan is about 33 mm. The forewings are brown with the costa and termen faintly ochreous. From the anal angle, an area of fuscous shading extends upward and outward to near the costa and there is a spot at the end of the cell, consisting of a ring of light brown enclosing a spot of slightly darker brown. There is a transverse, outwardly curved faint fuscous line at the apical fourth, extending from the costa to the dorsum. The hindwings are grey.
