= Baeonoma favillata =

Scientific classification
- Kingdom: Animalia
- Phylum: Arthropoda
- Class: Insecta
- Order: Lepidoptera
- Family: Depressariidae
- Genus: Baeonoma
- Species: B. favillata

Binomial name
- Baeonoma favillata (Meyrick, 1915)

Synonyms
- Stenoma favillata Meyrick, 1915

Species of moth

Baeonoma favillata is a moth of the family Depressariidae. It is found in Peru.

The wingspan is about 16 mm. The forewings are grey-whitish with the costa narrowly grey from the base to four-fifths, darker towards the base. There is a spot of grey suffusion below the middle of the disc, one on the upper angle of the cell, and two small ones towards the lower angle, as well as a rather broad subterminal fascia of grey suffusion, interrupted on the veins. There are some cloudy dark fuscous marginal dots around the apex and termen. The hindwings are grey.
