= Anadasmus germinans =

Scientific classification
- Kingdom: Animalia
- Phylum: Arthropoda
- Class: Insecta
- Order: Lepidoptera
- Family: Depressariidae
- Genus: Anadasmus
- Species: A. germinans

Binomial name
- Anadasmus germinans (Meyrick, 1925)

Synonyms
- Stenoma germinans Meyrick, 1925

Species of moth

Anadasmus germinans is a moth of the family Depressariidae. It is found in Colombia.

The wingspan is about 27 mm. The forewings are light brownish-fuscous with well-marked scale-tufts above and below the middle at one-fifth. The plical and second discal stigmata are dark fuscous. There are fasciae of very faint darker suffusion crossing the wing at one-third and beyond the middle, the second slightly curved. There is a rather curved waved fuscous line from the costa at four-fifths to the dorsum before the tornus, sinuate towards the costa. The hindwings are grey, darker posteriorly and with an expansible fringe-tuft of long pale ochreous hairs from near the dorsum on the upper half projecting inwards beneath the abdomen.
