= Mothonica fluminata =

Scientific classification
- Kingdom: Animalia
- Phylum: Arthropoda
- Class: Insecta
- Order: Lepidoptera
- Family: Depressariidae
- Genus: Mothonica
- Species: M. fluminata

Binomial name
- Mothonica fluminata (Meyrick, 1912)

Synonyms
- Stenoma fluminata Meyrick, 1912

Species of moth

Mothonica fluminata is a moth of the family Depressariidae. It is found in Colombia and Suriname.

The wingspan is 18–27 mm. The forewings are pale brownish, in the disc and towards the dorsum tinged with yellowish and sprinkled with dark fuscous, towards the costa sometimes suffused with whitish. The veins are more or less marked with suffused dark fuscous lines and there is an undefined streak of dark fuscous suffusion from the base of the costa to below the middle of the disc, sometimes obsolete posteriorly. A dentate dark fuscous or blackish line is found from one-fourth of the costa, reaching half across the wing. The plical and second discal stigmata are dark fuscous with an elongate dark fuscous spot on the costa before the middle, and an irregular attenuated streak extending from the middle of the costa beneath the costa to near the apex. A spot of dark fuscous suffusion is found on the dorsum beyond the middle and there is a strongly outwards-curved irregular series of dark fuscous dots from the middle of the costa to a dorsal spot before the tornus. There is also a series of dark fuscous marks around the posterior part of the costa and termen. The hindwings are pale grey.
