= Baeonoma =

Scientific classification
- Kingdom: Animalia
- Phylum: Arthropoda
- Clade: Pancrustacea
- Class: Insecta
- Order: Lepidoptera
- Family: Depressariidae
- Subfamily: Stenomatinae
- Genus: Baeonoma; Meyrick, 1916

Genus of moths

Baeonoma is a genus of moths in the subfamily Stenomatinae.

== Species ==
- Baeonoma euphanes Meyrick, 1916
- Baeonoma favillata (Meyrick, 1915)
- Baeonoma helotypa Meyrick, 1916
- Baeonoma holarga Meyrick, 1916
- Baeonoma infamis Meyrick, 1925
- Baeonoma leucodelta (Meyrick, 1914)
- Baeonoma leucophaeella (Walker, 1864)
- Baeonoma mastodes Meyrick, 1916
- Baeonoma orthozona Meyrick, 1916
- Baeonoma suavis Meyrick, 1916
