= Lethata optima =

Scientific classification
- Domain: Eukaryota
- Kingdom: Animalia
- Phylum: Arthropoda
- Class: Insecta
- Order: Lepidoptera
- Family: Depressariidae
- Genus: Lethata
- Species: L. optima

Binomial name
- Lethata optima Duckworth, 1967

Species of moth

Lethata optima is a moth of the family Depressariidae. It is found in Peru.

The wingspan is about 34 mm. The forewings are greyish overcast with reddish brown especially in the anal area and with the costa narrowly ochreous. The termen is ochreous with a purplish spot at the end of the cell with scattered white scales. The entire wing with scattered fuscous scales. The hindwings are whitish overcast with grey.
