= Promenesta autampyx =

Scientific classification
- Domain: Eukaryota
- Kingdom: Animalia
- Phylum: Arthropoda
- Class: Insecta
- Order: Lepidoptera
- Family: Depressariidae
- Genus: Promenesta
- Species: P. autampyx

Binomial name
- Promenesta autampyx Meyrick, 1925

Synonyms
- Promenesta citroscia Meyrick, 1931

Species of moth

Promenesta autampyx is a moth in the family Depressariidae. It was described by Edward Meyrick in 1925. It is found in Peru, Paraguay and Brazil.
