= Herbulotiana longifascia =

Scientific classification
- Domain: Eukaryota
- Kingdom: Animalia
- Phylum: Arthropoda
- Class: Insecta
- Order: Lepidoptera
- Family: Depressariidae
- Genus: Herbulotiana
- Species: H. longifascia

Binomial name
- Herbulotiana longifascia Viette, 1954

Species of moth

Herbulotiana longifascia is a species of moth in the family Depressariidae. It was described by Pierre Viette in 1954. It is found in Madagascar.
