= Lethata aromatica =

Scientific classification
- Kingdom: Animalia
- Phylum: Arthropoda
- Class: Insecta
- Order: Lepidoptera
- Family: Depressariidae
- Genus: Lethata
- Species: L. aromatica

Binomial name
- Lethata aromatica (Meyrick, 1915)

Synonyms
- Stenoma aromatica Meyrick, 1915

Species of moth

Lethata aromatica is a moth of the family Depressariidae. It is found in Brazil (São Paulo, Paraná, Espirito Santo, Santa Catarina) and Colombia.

The wingspan is about 22 mm. The forewings are brownish ochreous, with some scattered black and fuscous scales, the costa narrowly suffused with dull light rosy. There is a small purplish-fuscous spot in the middle of the costa, where a faint, hardly definable fuscous shade runs to one-fourth of the dorsum. A slight fuscous mark represents the second discal stigma. The hindwingsare ochreous-grey whitish, the dorsal half suffused with light grey.
