= Orphnolechia =

Scientific classification
- Domain: Eukaryota
- Kingdom: Animalia
- Phylum: Arthropoda
- Class: Insecta
- Order: Lepidoptera
- Family: Depressariidae
- Subfamily: Stenomatinae
- Genus: Orphnolechia; Meyrick, 1909

Genus of moths

Orphnolechia is a genus of moths in the subfamily Stenomatinae.

== Species ==
- Orphnolechia acridula (Meyrick, 1918)
- Orphnolechia anaphanta (Meyrick, 1925)
- Orphnolechia crypsiphragma Meyrick, 1909
- Orphnolechia neastra (Meyrick, 1915)
