= Thioscelis =

Scientific classification
- Kingdom: Animalia
- Phylum: Arthropoda
- Class: Insecta
- Order: Lepidoptera
- Family: Depressariidae
- Subfamily: Stenomatinae
- Genus: Thioscelis; Meyrick, 1909

Genus of moths

Thioscelis is a moth genus of the family Depressariidae.

== Species ==
- Thioscelis directrix Meyrick, 1909
- Thioscelis fuscata Duckworth, 1967
- Thioscelis geranomorpha Meyrick, 1932
- Thioscelis lipara Duckworth, 1967
- Thioscelis whalleyi Duckworth, 1967
