= Phelotropa conversa =

Scientific classification
- Kingdom: Animalia
- Phylum: Arthropoda
- Class: Insecta
- Order: Lepidoptera
- Family: Depressariidae
- Genus: Phelotropa
- Species: P. conversa

Binomial name
- Phelotropa conversa Meyrick, 1923

Species of moth

Phelotropa conversa is a moth in the family Depressariidae. It was described by Edward Meyrick in 1923. It is found in French Guiana.

The wingspan is about 32 mm. The forewings are light greyish ochreous, towards the termen whitish tinged between the veins. The second discal stigma is dark fuscous, the plical represented by a minute dark fuscous dash. There is also a marginal series of dark fuscous dots around the posterior part of the costa and termen. The hindwings are pale whitish grey.
