= Lethata pyrenodes =

Scientific classification
- Kingdom: Animalia
- Phylum: Arthropoda
- Class: Insecta
- Order: Lepidoptera
- Family: Depressariidae
- Genus: Lethata
- Species: L. pyrenodes

Binomial name
- Lethata pyrenodes (Meyrick, 1915)

Synonyms
- Stenoma pyrenodes Meyrick, 1915

Species of moth

Lethata pyrenodes is a moth of the family Depressariidae. It is found in northern Argentina and Paraná, Brazil.

The wingspan is about 19 mm. The forewings are deep pinkish-yellow-ochreous with a fuscous triangular spot on the middle of the costa. The plical stigma is small and fuscous and the second discal is represented by a strong transverse fuscous mark. There is a faint shade of fuscous suffusion from the costal spot passing behind this to the dorsum and a faintly indicated somewhat darker rather curved line from three-fourths of the costa to near the tornus. The hindwings are ochreous-whitish, towards the apex and termen faintly yellowish-tinged.
