= Baeonoma mastodes =

Scientific classification
- Kingdom: Animalia
- Phylum: Arthropoda
- Class: Insecta
- Order: Lepidoptera
- Family: Depressariidae
- Genus: Baeonoma
- Species: B. mastodes

Binomial name
- Baeonoma mastodes Meyrick, 1916

Species of moth

Baeonoma mastodes is a moth of the family Depressariidae. It is found in French Guiana Argentina and Brazil

The wingspan is 15–19 mm. The forewings are white with a rather thick suffused dark fuscous streak along the costa from the base to beyond the middle and a rounded-triangular dark fuscous blotch on the middle of the dorsum, reaching half across the wing. There is a slight spot of fuscous irroration on the end of the cell. There is a variable rounded blotch of dark fuscous irroration or suffusion extending over the termen. The hindwings are grey.
