= Petalothyrsa =

Scientific classification
- Kingdom: Animalia
- Phylum: Arthropoda
- Class: Insecta
- Order: Lepidoptera
- Family: Depressariidae
- Subfamily: Stenomatinae
- Genus: Petalothyrsa; Meyrick, 1931
- Species: P. microphthalma

Binomial name
- Petalothyrsa microphthalma Meyrick, 1931

Genus of moths

Petalothyrsa is a monotypic moth genus in the family Depressariidae. Its only species, Petalothyrsa microphthalma, is found in Brazil. Both the genus and species were first described by Edward Meyrick in 1931.
