= Promenesta solella =

Scientific classification
- Kingdom: Animalia
- Phylum: Arthropoda
- Class: Insecta
- Order: Lepidoptera
- Family: Depressariidae
- Genus: Promenesta
- Species: P. solella

Binomial name
- Promenesta solella (Walker, 1864)

Synonyms
- Gelechia solella Walker, 1864

Species of moth

Promenesta solella is a moth in the family Depressariidae. It was described by Francis Walker in 1864. It is found in Amazonas, Brazil.

Adults are pale ochraceous, the forewings longitudinally and irregularly streaked with darker ochraceous and with a slight blackish streak extending from the base along one-fourth of the length of the disk. The hindwings are dark cinereous.
