= Anadasmus obmutescens =

Scientific classification
- Kingdom: Animalia
- Phylum: Arthropoda
- Clade: Pancrustacea
- Class: Insecta
- Order: Lepidoptera
- Family: Depressariidae
- Genus: Anadasmus
- Species: A. obmutescens

Binomial name
- Anadasmus obmutescens (Meyrick, 1916)

Synonyms
- Stenoma obmutescens Meyrick, 1916; Stenoma pleurotricha Meyrick, 1925

Species of moth

Anadasmus obmutescens is a moth of the family Depressariidae. It is found in French Guiana and Brazil (Amazonas).

The wingspan is 29–31 mm (1.1–1.2 in). The forewings are light violet-fuscous, the costal edge ochreous-whitish. The plical and second discal stigmata are dark fuscous. There is a line of cloudy dark fuscous dots from beneath the costa at three-fourths to the dorsum before the tornus, angularly indented towards the costa, then moderately strongly curved. There is a terminal series of dark fuscous dots. The hindwings are rather dark grey.
