= Lethata dispersa =

Scientific classification
- Kingdom: Animalia
- Phylum: Arthropoda
- Class: Insecta
- Order: Lepidoptera
- Family: Depressariidae
- Genus: Lethata
- Species: L. dispersa

Binomial name
- Lethata dispersa Duckworth, 1967

Species of moth

Lethata dispersa is a moth of the family Depressariidae. It is found in Brazil (Matto Grosso).

The wingspan is about 23 mm. The forewings are yellow with the costa rosy and the dorsum narrowly edged brown and with a faint spot in the fold brown. There is a spot at the end of the cell consisting of a ring of brown enclosing a whitish spot. There is an oblique brown line extending from the costa at near the midpoint through a spot at the end of the cell to the tornus. The terminal line is brown. The hindwings are grey.
