= Menestomorpha oblongata =

Scientific classification
- Kingdom: Animalia
- Phylum: Arthropoda
- Clade: Pancrustacea
- Class: Insecta
- Order: Lepidoptera
- Family: Depressariidae
- Genus: Menestomorpha
- Species: M. oblongata

Binomial name
- Menestomorpha oblongata Walsingham, 1907

Species of moth

Menestomorpha oblongata is a moth in the family Depressariidae. It was described by Walsingham in 1907. It is found in North America, where it has been recorded from Florida, Arizona and California.

The wingspan is about 15 mm. The forewings are white with two transverse brown bands converging at the anal angle forming a V-shaped mark on the basal third, the middle third with indistinct brown shading blending into indistinct brown streaks in the apical third that follow the lines of the veins beyond the cell to the termen and costa. There is a row of five or six indistinct brownish dots along the termen reaching to the apex. The hindwings are light brown.

The species was reared from a cynipid gall on a Quercus species.
