= Lethata psidii =

Scientific classification
- Domain: Eukaryota
- Kingdom: Animalia
- Phylum: Arthropoda
- Class: Insecta
- Order: Lepidoptera
- Family: Depressariidae
- Genus: Lethata
- Species: L. psidii

Binomial name
- Lethata psidii (Sepp, [1852])

Synonyms
- Phalaena psidii Sepp, [1852]; Stenoma invigilans Meyrick, 1915

Species of moth

Lethata psidii is a moth of the family Depressariidae. It is found in the Guianas and Venezuela.

The wingspan is 24–26 mm. The forewings are light brown, with a few scattered black scales and with the costal edge dull pinkish. There are three cloudy fuscous transverse lines, the first at one-fourth, obtusely angulated on the fold, dilated on the dorsum, the second in the middle, forming a small spot on the costa, strongly curved outwards in the disc, the third from a larger cloudy spot on the costa at three-fourths to the dorsum before the tornus, moderately curved. The second discal stigma forms a conspicuous small round blackish spot and there is a marginal series of dark fuscous dots around the apex and termen. The hindwings are grey.
