= Catarata lepisma =

Scientific classification
- Domain: Eukaryota
- Kingdom: Animalia
- Phylum: Arthropoda
- Class: Insecta
- Order: Lepidoptera
- Family: Depressariidae
- Genus: Catarata
- Species: C. lepisma

Binomial name
- Catarata lepisma Walsingham, 1912

Species of moth

Catarata lepisma is a moth in the family Depressariidae. It was described by Walsingham in 1912. It is found in Panama.

The wingspan is 15–16 mm. The forewings are whitish ochreous, much sprinkled and smeared with smoky fuscous. In addition to some general irroration, a costal shade, extending from one-fifth to beyond the middle, is followed by another costal patch, or shade, before the apex, from which arises, on its outer side, a series of fuscous spots, continued around the apex and termen, and from its lower edge a second series, more or less confluent, bowed outward and reverting to the dorsum about the tornus; there are two dark shade-patches also on the dorsum, one before and one beyond the middle, other scattered dark scaling extending across the cell. The hindwings are rather shining, greyish fuscous.
