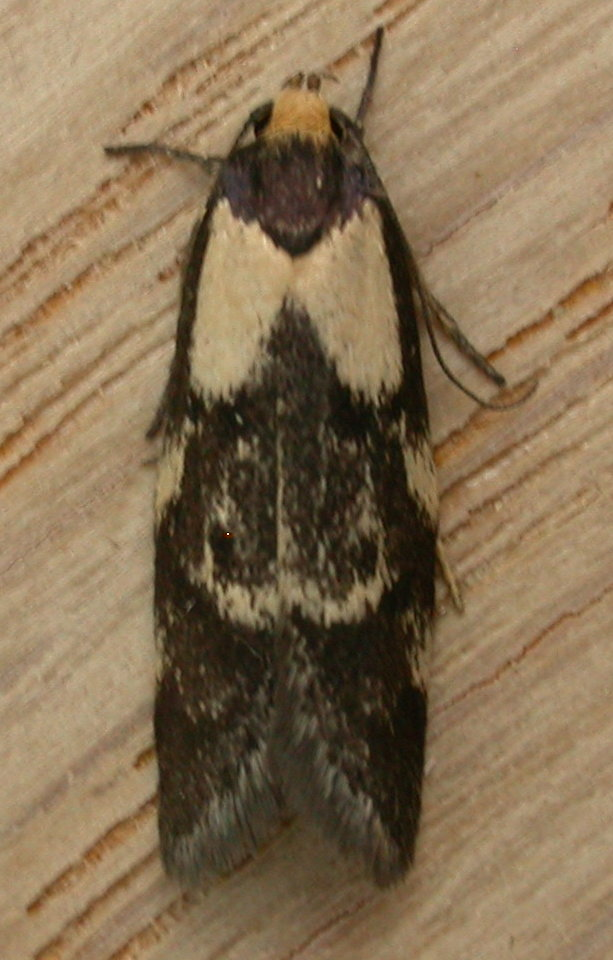
- Phylomictis maligna

Scientific classification
- Domain: Eukaryota
- Kingdom: Animalia
- Phylum: Arthropoda
- Class: Insecta
- Order: Lepidoptera
- Family: Depressariidae
- Subfamily: Stenomatinae
- Genus: Phylomictis; Meyrick, 1890

Synonyms
- Comoscotopa Lower, 1902

= Phylomictis =

Genus of moths

Phylomictis is a moth genus of the family Depressariidae.

== Species ==
- Phylomictis decretoria Lucas, 1900
- Phylomictis eclecta Turner, 1906
- Phylomictis idiotricha Meyrick, 1921
- Phylomictis leucopelta (Lower, 1902)
- Phylomictis lintearia Meyrick, 1921
- Phylomictis maligna Meyrick, 1890
- Phylomictis monochroma Lower, 1892
- Phylomictis palaeomorpha Turner, 1898
- Phylomictis sarcinopa Meyrick, 1920
