= Herbulotiana robustella =

Scientific classification
- Kingdom: Animalia
- Phylum: Arthropoda
- Class: Insecta
- Order: Lepidoptera
- Family: Depressariidae
- Genus: Herbulotiana
- Species: H. robustella

Binomial name
- Herbulotiana robustella Viette, 1956

Species of moth

Herbulotiana robustella is a moth in the family of Depressariidae. It was described by Pierre Viette in 1956. It is found in Madagascar.
