= Paraspastis =

Scientific classification
- Kingdom: Animalia
- Phylum: Arthropoda
- Class: Insecta
- Order: Lepidoptera
- Family: Depressariidae
- Subfamily: Stenomatinae
- Genus: Paraspastis; Meyrick, 1915
- Species: P. circographa

Binomial name
- Paraspastis circographa Meyrick, 1915

Genus of moths

Paraspastis circographa is a moth of the family Depressariidae and the only species in the genus Paraspastis. It is found in Guyana.

The wingspan is 17–18 mm. The forewings are light ochreous, with violet reflections, the costa and dorsum more or less suffused with brownish. There is a subcostal line of whitish suffusion from the base to one-third, and one along the upper margin of the cell, as well as a cloudy white ring, internally edged with greyish, lying across fold before the middle of the wing, and a larger similar ring occupying the posterior portion of the cell, these connected by a quadrate brown spot above the middle of the disc edged beneath with blackish. An elongate dark brown mark is found on the middle of the costa, preceded and followed by oblique white strigulae, the second sending a curved cloudy white line to the tornus, the veins between this and the cell partially streaked with white. There is a shorter suffused dark brown mark on the costa beyond this and the costa towards the apex is brown, with two or three small indistinct whitish dots, and suffused beneath with ferruginous. There are also two white dots on the apical margin and a blackish-grey spot along the termen, not reaching the apex or tornus. The hindwings are grey.
