= Zetesima lasia =

Scientific classification
- Domain: Eukaryota
- Kingdom: Animalia
- Phylum: Arthropoda
- Class: Insecta
- Order: Lepidoptera
- Family: Depressariidae
- Genus: Zetesima
- Species: Z. lasia

Binomial name
- Zetesima lasia Walsingham, 1912

Species of moth

Zetesima lasia is a moth in the family Depressariidae. It was described by Thomas de Grey in 1912. It is found in Panama.

The wingspan is about 12.5 mm. The forewings are fawn-ochreous, streaked and shaded with greyish fuscous, of which there is a broken line along the costa, becoming continuous along the termen. A less conspicuous line below the costa, and a third, darker and more conspicuous, short line along the upper edge of the cell, both the latter fading into a paler, more greyish, suffusion beyond the cell. Some indistinct streaks and spots occur also on the cell, one at the base of the dorsum, one about its middle and one at the tornus, throwing out some almost blackish scales through the otherwise pale fawn-ochreous cilia. The hindwings are greyish fuscous, a slender subochreous line at the base of the fuscous cilia is rather strengthened toward the apex.
