= Loxotoma seminigrens =

Scientific classification
- Kingdom: Animalia
- Phylum: Arthropoda
- Class: Insecta
- Order: Lepidoptera
- Family: Depressariidae
- Genus: Loxotoma
- Species: L. seminigrens

Binomial name
- Loxotoma seminigrens Meyrick, 1932

Species of moth

Loxotoma seminigrens is a moth in the family Depressariidae. It was described by Edward Meyrick in 1932. It is found in Rio de Janeiro, Brazil.
