= Mocquerysiella bourginella =

Scientific classification
- Kingdom: Animalia
- Phylum: Arthropoda
- Class: Insecta
- Order: Lepidoptera
- Family: Depressariidae
- Genus: Mocquerysiella
- Species: M. bourginella

Binomial name
- Mocquerysiella bourginella Viette, 1954

Species of moth

Mocquerysiella bourginella is a moth in the family Depressariidae. It was described by Pierre Viette in 1954. It is found in Madagascar.
