= Promenesta callichlora =

Scientific classification
- Domain: Eukaryota
- Kingdom: Animalia
- Phylum: Arthropoda
- Class: Insecta
- Order: Lepidoptera
- Family: Depressariidae
- Genus: Promenesta
- Species: P. callichlora

Binomial name
- Promenesta callichlora Meyrick, 1915

Species of moth

Promenesta callichlora is a moth in the family Depressariidae. It was described by Edward Meyrick in 1915. It is found in Guyana.

The wingspan is about 13 mm. The forewings are violet grey with a large deep olive-green patch extending on the dorsum from the base to three-fourths and reaching three-fourths across the wing, its upper edge parallel to the costa, the posterior edge irregular. The costal area above this is suffused with whitish from the base to beyond one-third. There is a slender ferruginous costal streak from one-third, gradually dilated, towards the apex suffused with whitish and marked with two blackish marks, passing into a fine whitish terminal line, the extreme terminal edge black. The hindwings are blackish.
