= Herbulotiana zorobella =

Scientific classification
- Kingdom: Animalia
- Phylum: Arthropoda
- Class: Insecta
- Order: Lepidoptera
- Family: Depressariidae
- Genus: Herbulotiana
- Species: H. zorobella

Binomial name
- Herbulotiana zorobella Viette, 1988

Species of moth

Herbulotiana zorobella is a moth in the family Depressariidae. It was described by Viette in 1988. It is found in Madagascar.
