= Phylomictis palaeomorpha =

Scientific classification
- Domain: Eukaryota
- Kingdom: Animalia
- Phylum: Arthropoda
- Class: Insecta
- Order: Lepidoptera
- Family: Depressariidae
- Genus: Phylomictis
- Species: P. palaeomorpha

Binomial name
- Phylomictis palaeomorpha Turner, 1898

Species of moth

Phylomictis palaeomorpha is a moth in the family Depressariidae. It was described by Alfred Jefferis Turner in 1898. It is found in Australia, where it has been recorded from Queensland.
