= Eriogenes =

Scientific classification
- Kingdom: Animalia
- Phylum: Arthropoda
- Class: Insecta
- Order: Lepidoptera
- Family: Depressariidae
- Subfamily: Stenomatinae
- Genus: Eriogenes; Meyrick, 1925

Genus of moths

Eriogenes is a moth genus of the family Depressariidae.

== Species ==
- Eriogenes mesogypsa Meyrick, 1925
- Eriogenes cossoides (Butler, 1882)
- Eriogenes nielseni Edwards, 2003

== Former species ==
- Eriogenes meyricki Duckworth, 1973
