= Baeonoma leucodelta =

Scientific classification
- Domain: Eukaryota
- Kingdom: Animalia
- Phylum: Arthropoda
- Class: Insecta
- Order: Lepidoptera
- Family: Depressariidae
- Genus: Baeonoma
- Species: B. leucodelta

Binomial name
- Baeonoma leucodelta (Meyrick, 1914)

Synonyms
- Machimia leucodelta Meyrick, 1914

Species of moth

Baeonoma leucodelta is a moth in the family Depressariidae. It was described by Edward Meyrick in 1914. It is found in Guyana and Pará, Brazil.

The wingspan is about 7 mm. The forewings are dark fuscous, with a slight purplish gloss and with a triangular white blotch extending on the dorsum from beyond the middle to near the tornus, and reaching half across the wing. There is a smaller white apical patch, its edge running from five-sixths of the costa to the termen above the middle. The hindwings are rather dark grey.
