= Promenesta lithochroma =

Scientific classification
- Domain: Eukaryota
- Kingdom: Animalia
- Phylum: Arthropoda
- Class: Insecta
- Order: Lepidoptera
- Family: Depressariidae
- Genus: Promenesta
- Species: P. lithochroma

Binomial name
- Promenesta lithochroma Busck, 1914

Species of moth

Promenesta lithochroma is a moth in the family Depressariidae. It was described by August Busck in 1914. It is found in Panama.

The wingspan is 12–13 mm. The forewings are light saffron without any markings, but with the edges and apical part slightly darker. The hindwings are light yellow.
