= Baeonoma leucophaeella =

Scientific classification
- Kingdom: Animalia
- Phylum: Arthropoda
- Class: Insecta
- Order: Lepidoptera
- Family: Depressariidae
- Genus: Baeonoma
- Species: B. leucophaeella

Binomial name
- Baeonoma leucophaeella (Walker, 1864)

Synonyms
- Cryptolechia leucophaeella Walker, 1864

Species of moth

Baeonoma leucophaeella is a moth in the family Depressariidae. It was described by Francis Walker in 1864. It is found in Pará, Brazil.

Adults are silvery white and rather stout, with the underside of the forewings aeneous (bronze) black.
