= Mocquerysiella =

Scientific classification
- Kingdom: Animalia
- Phylum: Arthropoda
- Class: Insecta
- Order: Lepidoptera
- Family: Depressariidae
- Subfamily: Stenomatinae
- Genus: Mocquerysiella; Viette, 1954

Genus of moths

Mocquerysiella is a moth genus of the family Depressariidae.

== Species ==
- Mocquerysiella albicosta Viette, 1954
- Mocquerysiella bourginella Viette, 1954
