= Anadasmus vacans =

Scientific classification
- Kingdom: Animalia
- Phylum: Arthropoda
- Class: Insecta
- Order: Lepidoptera
- Family: Depressariidae
- Genus: Anadasmus
- Species: A. vacans

Binomial name
- Anadasmus vacans (Meyrick, 1916)

Synonyms
- Stenoma vacans Meyrick, 1916

Species of moth

Anadasmus vacans is a moth of the family Depressariidae. It is found in French Guiana.

The wingspan is 38–40 mm. The forewings are light greyish-ochreous, usually with irregularly scattered black specks. The plical and second discal stigmata are minute and blackish, sometimes with a curved subterminal series of minute blackish dots. There is a terminal series of minute blackish dots. The hindwings are dark grey, with the apex more or less tinged with pale ochreous.
