= Anadasmus leontodes =

Scientific classification
- Kingdom: Animalia
- Phylum: Arthropoda
- Class: Insecta
- Order: Lepidoptera
- Family: Depressariidae
- Genus: Anadasmus
- Species: A. leontodes

Binomial name
- Anadasmus leontodes (Meyrick, 1915)

Synonyms
- Gonioterma leontodes Meyrick, 1915

Species of moth

Anadasmus leontodes is a moth in the family Depressariidae. It was described by Edward Meyrick in 1915. It is found in Suriname.

The wingspan is about 28 mm. The forewings are reddish-brown with the plical and second discal stigmata small and dark fuscous. There is some fuscous suffusion towards the dorsum about one-fourth and an undefined fascia of fuscous suffusion crossing the wing about two-thirds, strongly curved outwards in the disc. There is a curved subterminal series of fuscous dots. The hindwings are fuscous, with an apical patch of pale ochreous suffusion.
