= Baeonoma infamis =

Scientific classification
- Domain: Eukaryota
- Kingdom: Animalia
- Phylum: Arthropoda
- Class: Insecta
- Order: Lepidoptera
- Family: Depressariidae
- Genus: Baeonoma
- Species: B. infamis

Binomial name
- Baeonoma infamis Meyrick, 1925

Species of moth

Baeonoma infamis is a moth in the family Depressariidae. It was described by Edward Meyrick in 1925. It is found in Brazil.

The wingspan is 19–22 mm. The forewings are fuscous and the hindwings are dark grey.
