= Lethata satyropa =

Scientific classification
- Kingdom: Animalia
- Phylum: Arthropoda
- Class: Insecta
- Order: Lepidoptera
- Family: Depressariidae
- Genus: Lethata
- Species: L. satyropa

Binomial name
- Lethata satyropa (Meyrick, 1915)

Synonyms
- Stenoma satyropa Meyrick, 1915

Species of moth

Lethata satyropa is a moth of the family Depressariidae. It is found in French Guiana.

The wingspan is about 25 mm. The forewings are deep ochreous, with scattered black scales and with the costal edge dull crimson from the base to two-thirds, suffused beneath with purple and with a slender brown-red streak along the dorsum nearly throughout. There is a cloudy purplish line at two-fifths from the disc to the dorsum and a rather large round dark fuscous spot in the disc beyond the middle, containing a transverse purplish spot. A faint fine curved fuscous subterminal line is found from the disc to the dorsum and the apical and terminal margin are deep yellow ochreous. The hindwings are whitish ochreous, the dorsal third suffused with pale greyish, the apical and terminal edge yellow.
