= Mothonica cubana =

Scientific classification
- Kingdom: Animalia
- Phylum: Arthropoda
- Class: Insecta
- Order: Lepidoptera
- Family: Depressariidae
- Genus: Mothonica
- Species: M. cubana

Binomial name
- Mothonica cubana Duckworth, 1969

Species of moth

Mothonica cubana is a moth of the family Depressariidae. It is found in Cuba.

The wingspan is 14–19 mm. The forewings are white sprinkled with brown scales and with an indistinct brown triangular area on the costa at the basal one-third. There is a larger, more distinct brown triangular area on the costa at one-half and an outwardly curving transverse line from the costal two-thirds to the dorsum before the tornus, composed of a series of fuscous dashes. There is also a series of terminal fuscous dots from the costal two-thirds to the tornus and a fuscous spot at the end of the cell, as well as a fuscous patch on the dorsum below the spot and a triangular fuscous patch on the dorsum at the anal angle. The hindwings are white.

The larvae bore the seeds of Copernicia glabrescens.
