= Catarata =

Scientific classification
- Domain: Eukaryota
- Kingdom: Animalia
- Phylum: Arthropoda
- Class: Insecta
- Order: Lepidoptera
- Family: Depressariidae
- Genus: Catarata; Walsingham, 1912

Genus of moths

Catarata is a moth genus of the family Depressariidae.

== Species ==
- Catarata lepisma Walsingham, 1912
- Catarata obnubila Busck, 1914
- Catarata stenota Walsingham, 1912
