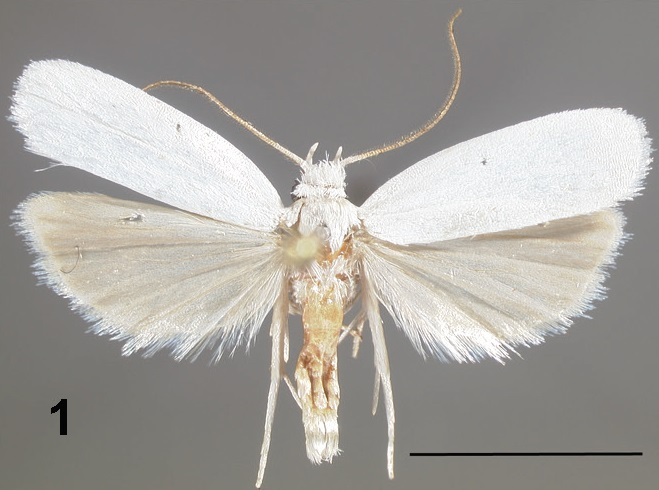
- Male
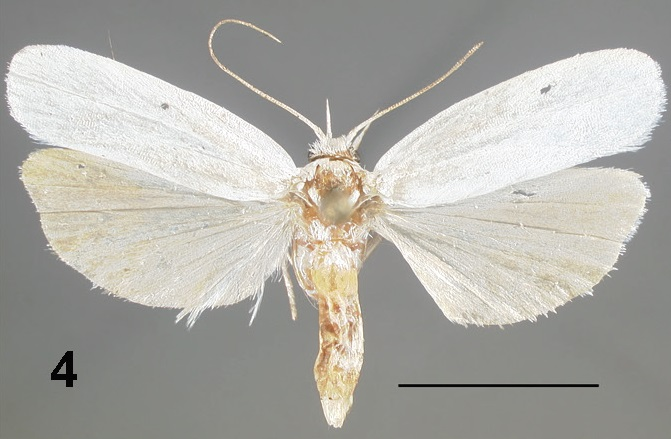
- Female

Scientific classification
- Kingdom: Animalia
- Phylum: Arthropoda
- Class: Insecta
- Order: Lepidoptera
- Family: Depressariidae
- Genus: Antaeotricha
- Species: A. floridella

Binomial name
- Antaeotricha floridella Hayden & Dickel, 2015

= Antaeotricha floridella =

Species of moth

Antaeotricha floridella is a moth of the family Depressariidae. It is found in North America, where it has been recorded from peninsular Florida.

== Description ==
The length of the forewings is 6–7 mm for males and 6.5–8.5 mm for females. The forewings are matte white with no trace of black discal spots or other maculation, or if greased, pale lemon yellow. The costa is pale brown proximally and white distally. The hindwings pale grey on both sides. Adults have been recorded on wing from April to October.

The larvae have been reared on the leaves of Quercus geminata, Quercus minima and Galactia regularis.

== Etymology ==
The species name is an adjective derived from the state of Florida.
