= Anapatris =

Scientific classification
- Kingdom: Animalia
- Phylum: Arthropoda
- Class: Insecta
- Order: Lepidoptera
- Family: Depressariidae
- Genus: Anapatris; Meyrick, 1932
- Species: A. chersopsamma

Binomial name
- Anapatris chersopsamma Meyrick, 1932

Genus of moths

Anapatris is a monotypic moth genus in the family Depressariidae. Its only species, Anapatris chersopsamma, is found in Panama. Both the genus and species were described by Edward Meyrick in 1932.

According to the original description by Edward Meyrick, Anapatris chersopsamma has a wingspan of 17-20 mm. The head, palpi, and thorax are light brownish-ochreous. The forewings are elongated with a gently arched leading edge (costa) and a blunt (obtuse) apex. Their color is light brownish-ochreous, irregularly sprinkled with dark brown (fuscous) scales, featuring a small blackish dot at the base of the costa and another in the middle of the cell. The hindwings are pale whitish-grey, with a faint yellowish or ochreous tint toward the tips.
