= Petasanthes =

Scientific classification
- Kingdom: Animalia
- Phylum: Arthropoda
- Class: Insecta
- Order: Lepidoptera
- Family: Depressariidae
- Genus: Petasanthes; Meyrick, 1925
- Species: P. leucactis

Binomial name
- Petasanthes leucactis Meyrick, 1925

Genus of moths

Petasanthes is a monotypic moth genus in the family Depressariidae. Its only species, Petasanthes leucactis, is found in Ecuador. Both the genus and species were first described by Edward Meyrick in 1925.

The wingspan is 26–29 mm. The forewings are deep orange with the costa narrowly black towards the base, from before one-third with a gradually expanded black marginal band widest opposite the apex, where it occupies one-third of the wing, and then rather narrowed along the termen to below the tornus, cut by whitish streaks on all veins. There is a round blackish spot on the transverse vein. The hindwings are orange, with a small blackish spot on the transverse vein, and a moderately broad blackish border cut by indistinct orange lines on the veins around the apex and upper three-fourths of the termen. There is some blackish irroration (sprinkling) towards the dorsum and tornus and sometimes the orange area is almost wholly suffused with blackish, except the costal area from near the base to three-fourths.
