= Menestomorpha kimballi =

Scientific classification
- Kingdom: Animalia
- Phylum: Arthropoda
- Clade: Pancrustacea
- Class: Insecta
- Order: Lepidoptera
- Family: Depressariidae
- Genus: Menestomorpha
- Species: M. kimballi

Binomial name
- Menestomorpha kimballi (Duckworth, 1964)

Synonyms
- Mothonica kimballi Duckworth, 1964

Species of moth

Menestomorpha kimballi is a moth in the family Depressariidae. It was described by W. Donald Duckworth in 1964. It is found in North America, where it has been recorded from Florida.

The wingspan is 17–19 mm. The forewings are white, with three large fuscous areas along the costa and a marginal and submarginal transverse row of fuscous dots at the apex, the marginal row darker and giving a sinuated effect to the termen. Another area of dark fuscous raised scales is found at the anal angle. The hindwings are very light fuscous.
