= Lethata obscura =

Scientific classification
- Domain: Eukaryota
- Kingdom: Animalia
- Phylum: Arthropoda
- Class: Insecta
- Order: Lepidoptera
- Family: Depressariidae
- Genus: Lethata
- Species: L. obscura

Binomial name
- Lethata obscura Duckworth, 1967

Species of moth

Lethata obscura is a moth of the family Depressariidae. It is found in Peru.

The wingspan is about 29 mm. The forewings are whitish varyingly overcast with brownish ochreous and with the costa, apex and termen narrowly deep ochreous. There is a small, purplish spot in the fold and a purplish spot at the end of the cell, with scattered whitish scales. There is also a faint, outwardly curving, transverse line from the costa at the apical third to near the tornus. There are also a few fuscous scales scattered irregularly over the entire wing. The hindwings are whitish, overcast with grey scales in the anal area.
