= Amontes =

Scientific classification
- Kingdom: Animalia
- Phylum: Arthropoda
- Class: Insecta
- Order: Lepidoptera
- Family: Depressariidae
- Genus: Amontes; Viette, 1958
- Species: A. princeps

Binomial name
- Amontes princeps Viette, 1958

Genus of moths

Amontes is a monotypic moth genus in the family Depressariidae. Its sole species is Amontes princeps, which was described by Viette in 1958. It is found in Madagascar.
