= Thioscelis directrix =

Scientific classification
- Kingdom: Animalia
- Phylum: Arthropoda
- Class: Insecta
- Order: Lepidoptera
- Family: Depressariidae
- Genus: Thioscelis
- Species: T. directrix

Binomial name
- Thioscelis directrix Meyrick, 1909

Species of moth

Thioscelis directrix is a moth in the family Depressariidae. It was described by Edward Meyrick in 1909. It is found in Peru, Bolivia and Costa Rica.

The wingspan is 62–63 mm. The forewings are light fuscous, paler and whitish tinged towards the costa anteriorly and with the costal edge ochreous brown. There are some ill-defined small blackish dots towards the costa on the median third, and two or three somewhat larger before the apex of the wing, a subterminal series of several very undefined blackish dots on the costal half of the wing and a series of undefined blackish dots or marks along the termen. The hindwings are light or rather dark fuscous, more or less yellow tinged towards the costa posteriorly.
