= Falculina ochricostata =

Scientific classification
- Kingdom: Animalia
- Phylum: Arthropoda
- Clade: Pancrustacea
- Class: Insecta
- Order: Lepidoptera
- Family: Depressariidae
- Genus: Falculina
- Species: F. ochricostata

Binomial name
- Falculina ochricostata Zeller, 1877

Species of moth

Falculina ochricostata is a moth of the family Depressariidae. It is found in Panama and Costa Rica.

The wingspan is 22–29 mm. The forewings are brownish ochreous, becoming whitish towards the costa basally. The costa is orange and the basal half of the wing is more or less irregularly spotted with fuscous including two round fuscous spots enclosed by a ring of ground color at the basal third. There is a line of indistinct fuscous dots from the middle of the costa to near the termen beneath the apex, then sharply angulated and sinuate to the dorsum before the tornus. A terminal series of fuscous dots is found from the apex to the tornus. The hindwings are stramineous, basally deepening to bright yellow apically.
