= Comella (disambiguation) =

Comella is a genus of moths of the family Callidulidae.

Comella may also refer to:

== People ==
- Michele Comella (1856–1926), Italian painter
- Luciano Comella 1751–1812), Spanish playwright
- Victor Comella Ferreres, Spanish professor
- Greg Comella, American football player
