= Griveaudia nigropuncta Viette, 1958 =

Griveaudia nigropuncta

Scientific classification
- Kingdom: Animalia
- Phylum: Arthropoda
- Class: Insecta
- Order: Lepidoptera
- Family: Callidulidae
- Genus: Griveaudia
- Species: G. nigropuncta

Binomial name
- Griveaudia nigropuncta Viette, 1958

Species of moth

Griveaudia nigropuncta is a species of moth of the family Callidulidae. It was described by Pierre Viette in 1958 and is found in Madagascar.

== Taxonomy ==
The name nigropuncta is preoccupied by Griveaudia nigropuncta described by John Leech in 1898.
