= Pterothysanus pictus =

Scientific classification
- Kingdom: Animalia
- Phylum: Arthropoda
- Class: Insecta
- Order: Lepidoptera
- Family: Callidulidae
- Genus: Pterothysanus
- Species: P. pictus

Binomial name
- Pterothysanus pictus Butler, 1884

Species of moth

Pterothysanus pictus is a moth of the family Callidulidae. It is found in Madagascar.

Common colors are black and white. It has a wingspan of 60mm.
