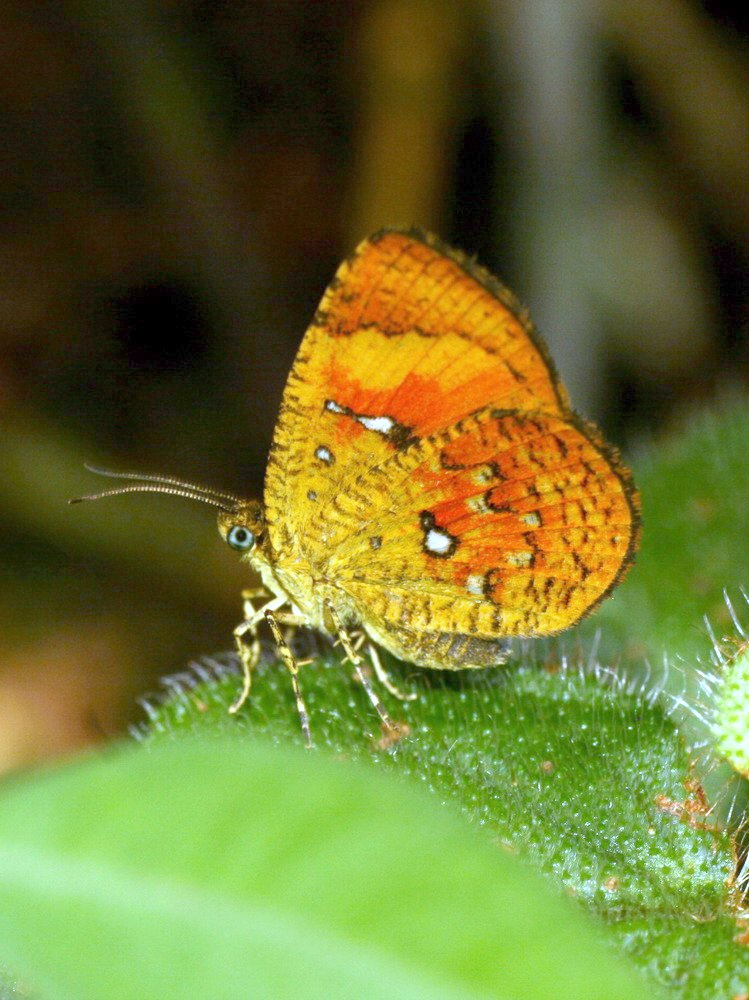

Scientific classification
- Domain: Eukaryota
- Kingdom: Animalia
- Phylum: Arthropoda
- Class: Insecta
- Order: Lepidoptera
- Family: Callidulidae
- Genus: Callidula
- Species: C. sakuni

Binomial name
- Callidula sakuni (Horsfield, [1828])

Synonyms
- Petavia sakuni Horsfield, 1828; Callidula abisara Butler, 1879; Datanga minor Moore, 1879; Callidula niasica Pagenstecher, 1887

= Callidula sakuni =

Species of moth

Callidula sakuni is a moth of the family Callidulidae. It is found in Sundaland, Burma and Thailand.

== Subspecies ==
- Callidula sakuni sakuni (Sundaland)
- Callidula sakuni minor (Moore, 1879) (Burma, Thailand)
