= Callidula lunigera =

Scientific classification
- Domain: Eukaryota
- Kingdom: Animalia
- Phylum: Arthropoda
- Class: Insecta
- Order: Lepidoptera
- Family: Callidulidae
- Genus: Callidula
- Species: C. lunigera

Binomial name
- Callidula lunigera (Butler, 1879)

Synonyms
- Cleis lunigera Butler, 1879

Species of moth

Callidula lunigera is a moth in the family Callidulidae. It is found in New Guinea.
