= Hippolyte and Polydore Pauquet =

French brothers and natural history illustrators

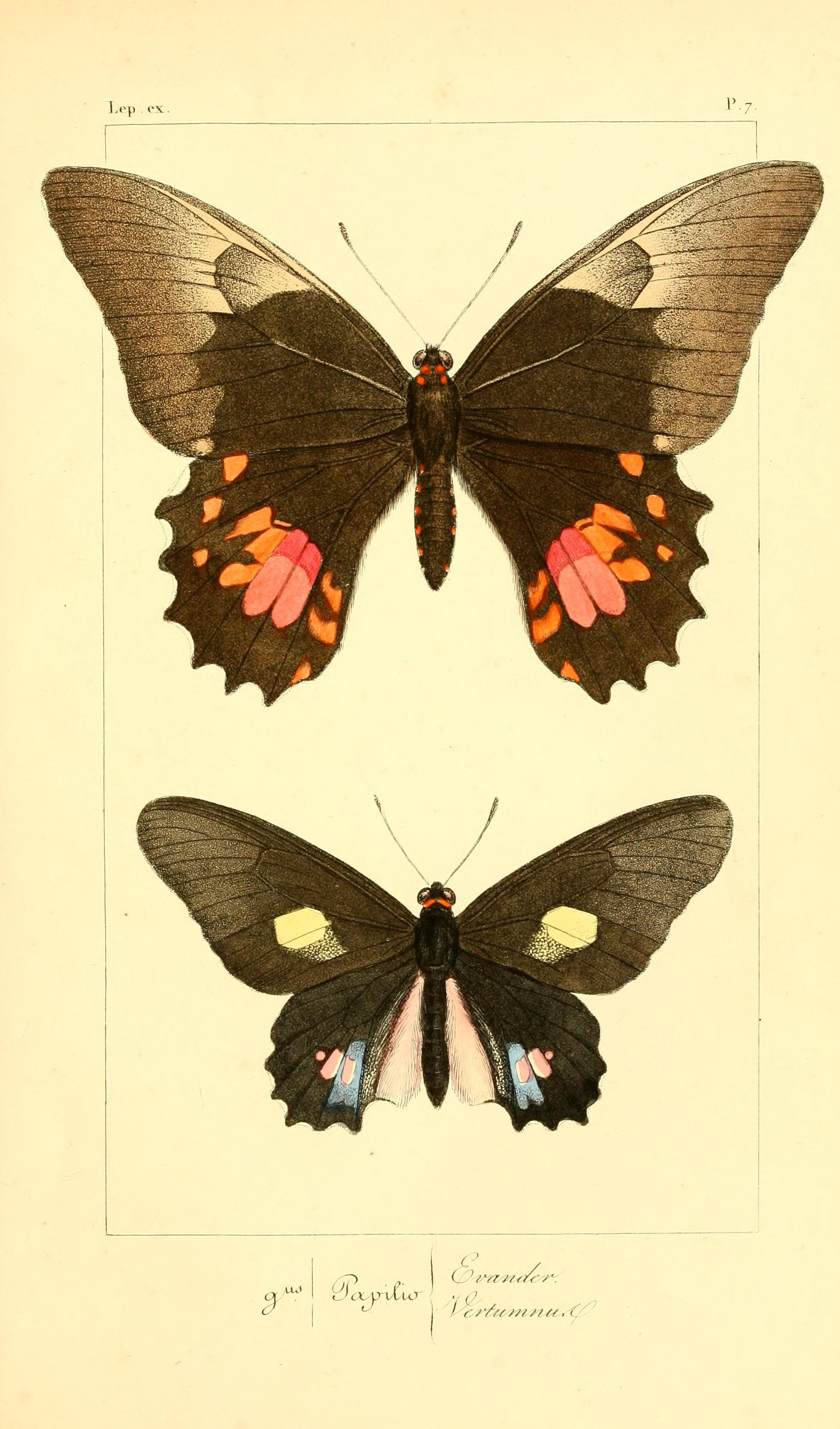
Papilio evander and Papilio vertumnus

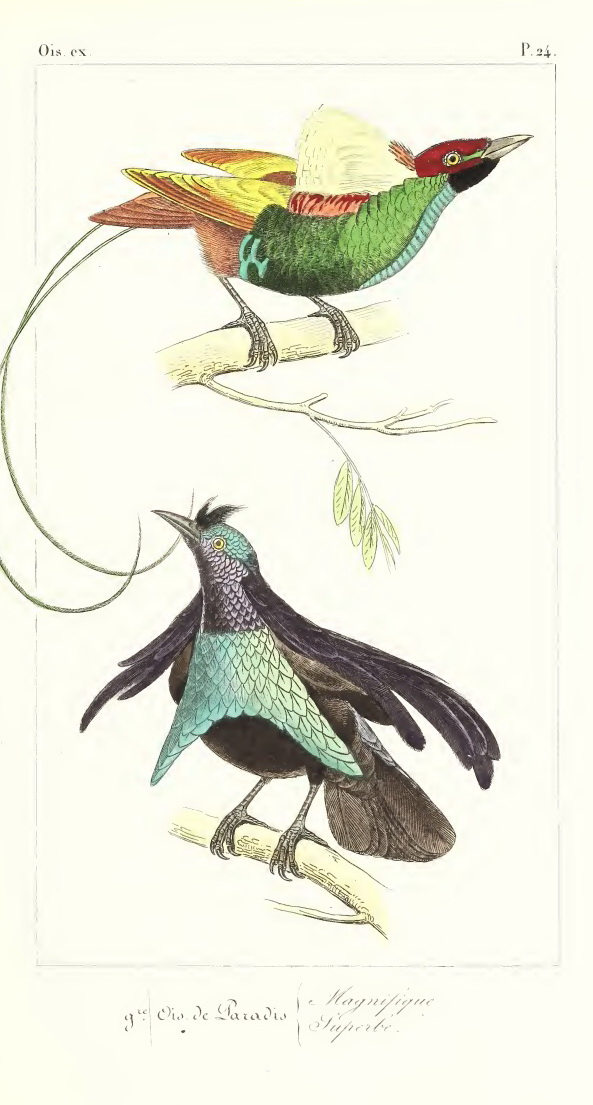
Cicinnurus magnificus and Lophorina superba

Hippolyte and Polydore Pauquet were French brothers and natural history illustrators. The 'Frères Pauquet' were celebrated 19th-century illustrators of a number of popular works including "Modes et Costumes Historiques Dessinés et Gravés par Pauquet Frères d'apres les Meilleurs Maitres de Chaque Epoque" (c1865). They were the sons of Jean Louis Charles Pauquet (1759–1837), artist and engraver, and Marie-Madeleine Lacroix (1771–1841).

Hippolyte-Louis-Émile Pauquet (28 February 1797 Paris – 20 March 1871) was the elder of the two and was largely responsible for engravings based on the illustrations by Polydore Jean-Charles Pauquet (30 July 1800 Paris – 20 April 1879), though the two shared credit for their works. They first served as apprentices to their father, Jean Louis Charles Pauquet, and on 18 August 1812 enrolled at the École nationale supérieure des Beaux-Arts in Paris. Their work was exhibited at the Paris Salon through the 1820s and 1830s, though their recognition came mainly from their publications.

== Personal lives ==
Hippolyte was married in 1824 to Marie Lale, deceased in 1868, producing a son and daughter, Emile Pauquet (1825–1895) and Laure Pauquet (1829–1909). Polydore was married on 26 July 1823 to Marie Marguerite Colin, (1802 Bourg-en-Bresse – 9 April 1867), producing two daughters, Henriette L. M. Pauquet (1824–1898) and Pauline Pauquet (1827–1897).

== Selected works ==
- Histoire Naturelle des Oiseaux Exotiques (1836)
- Histoire Naturelle Des Oiseaux D'Europe – Passereaux (1837)
- Histoire Naturelle des Lépidoptères Exotiques (1845)
- Modes et Costumes Historiques 2 vols. (1862)
