= Callidula plagalis =

Scientific classification
- Domain: Eukaryota
- Kingdom: Animalia
- Phylum: Arthropoda
- Class: Insecta
- Order: Lepidoptera
- Family: Callidulidae
- Genus: Callidula
- Species: C. plagalis

Binomial name
- Callidula plagalis (Felder, 1874)

Synonyms
- Cleis plagalis Felder, 1874

Species of moth

Callidula plagalis is a moth in the family Callidulidae. It is found on Aru.
