= Callidula nenia =

Scientific classification
- Domain: Eukaryota
- Kingdom: Animalia
- Phylum: Arthropoda
- Class: Insecta
- Order: Lepidoptera
- Family: Callidulidae
- Genus: Callidula
- Species: C. nenia

Binomial name
- Callidula nenia (H. Druce, 1888)

Synonyms
- Cleis nenia H. Druce, 1888

Species of moth

Callidula nenia is a moth in the family Callidulidae first described by Herbert Druce in 1888. It is found on the Solomon Islands.
