= Griveaudia charlesi =

Scientific classification
- Kingdom: Animalia
- Phylum: Arthropoda
- Class: Insecta
- Order: Lepidoptera
- Family: Callidulidae
- Genus: Griveaudia
- Species: G. charlesi

Binomial name
- Griveaudia charlesi Viette, 1968

Species of moth

Griveaudia charlesi is a species of moth of the family Callidulidae. It is found in western Madagascar.
