= Callidula waterstradti =

Scientific classification
- Kingdom: Animalia
- Phylum: Arthropoda
- Clade: Pancrustacea
- Class: Insecta
- Order: Lepidoptera
- Family: Callidulidae
- Genus: Callidula
- Species: C. waterstradti

Binomial name
- Callidula waterstradti Holloway, 1998

Species of moth

Callidula waterstradti is a moth of the family Callidulidae. It is found in Borneo, Sumatra and Peninsular Malaysia. It is predominantly a montane species, recorded at heights ranging from 1,200 to 1,930 meters.

The wingspan is 12–14 mm.
