= Comella insularis =

Scientific classification
- Domain: Eukaryota
- Kingdom: Animalia
- Phylum: Arthropoda
- Class: Insecta
- Order: Lepidoptera
- Family: Callidulidae
- Genus: Comella
- Species: C. insularis

Binomial name
- Comella insularis Joicey & Talbot, 1916

Species of moth

Comella insularis is a moth in the family Callidulidae. It is found on the Schouten Islands of eastern Indonesia.
