= Callidula aureola =

Scientific classification
- Kingdom: Animalia
- Phylum: Arthropoda
- Class: Insecta
- Order: Lepidoptera
- Family: Callidulidae
- Genus: Callidula
- Species: C. aureola

Binomial name
- Callidula aureola (C. Swinhoe, 1905)

Synonyms
- Cleis aureola C. Swinhoe, 1905

Species of moth

Callidula aureola is a moth in the family Callidulidae first described by Charles Swinhoe in 1905. It is found on the island of Obi, Indonesia.
