= Callidula versicolor =

Scientific classification
- Domain: Eukaryota
- Kingdom: Animalia
- Phylum: Arthropoda
- Class: Insecta
- Order: Lepidoptera
- Family: Callidulidae
- Genus: Callidula
- Species: C. versicolor

Binomial name
- Callidula versicolor (Felder, 1874)

Synonyms
- Cleis versicolor Felder, 1874; Damias romawa Pagenstecher, 1886

Species of moth

Callidula versicolor is a moth in the family Callidulidae. It is found in New Guinea.
