= Callidula fasciata =

Scientific classification
- Domain: Eukaryota
- Kingdom: Animalia
- Phylum: Arthropoda
- Class: Insecta
- Order: Lepidoptera
- Family: Callidulidae
- Genus: Callidula
- Species: C. fasciata

Binomial name
- Callidula fasciata (Butler, 1877)

Synonyms
- Cleis fasciata Butler, 1877

Species of moth

Callidula fasciata is a moth in the family Callidulidae. It is found on Ternate.
