= Callidula atata =

Scientific classification
- Domain: Eukaryota
- Kingdom: Animalia
- Phylum: Arthropoda
- Class: Insecta
- Order: Lepidoptera
- Family: Callidulidae
- Genus: Callidula
- Species: C. atata

Binomial name
- Callidula atata (C. Swinhoe, 1909)

Synonyms
- Cleis atata C. Swinhoe, 1909

Species of moth

Callidula atata is a moth in the family Callidulidae first described by Charles Swinhoe in 1909. It is found on the Kei Islands of Indonesia.
