= Callidula kobesi =

Scientific classification
- Kingdom: Animalia
- Phylum: Arthropoda
- Clade: Pancrustacea
- Class: Insecta
- Order: Lepidoptera
- Family: Callidulidae
- Genus: Callidula
- Species: C. kobesi

Binomial name
- Callidula kobesi Holloway, 1998

Species of moth

Callidula kobesi is a moth of the family Callidulidae. It is endemic to Borneo.

Its wingspan is 15–16 mm.
