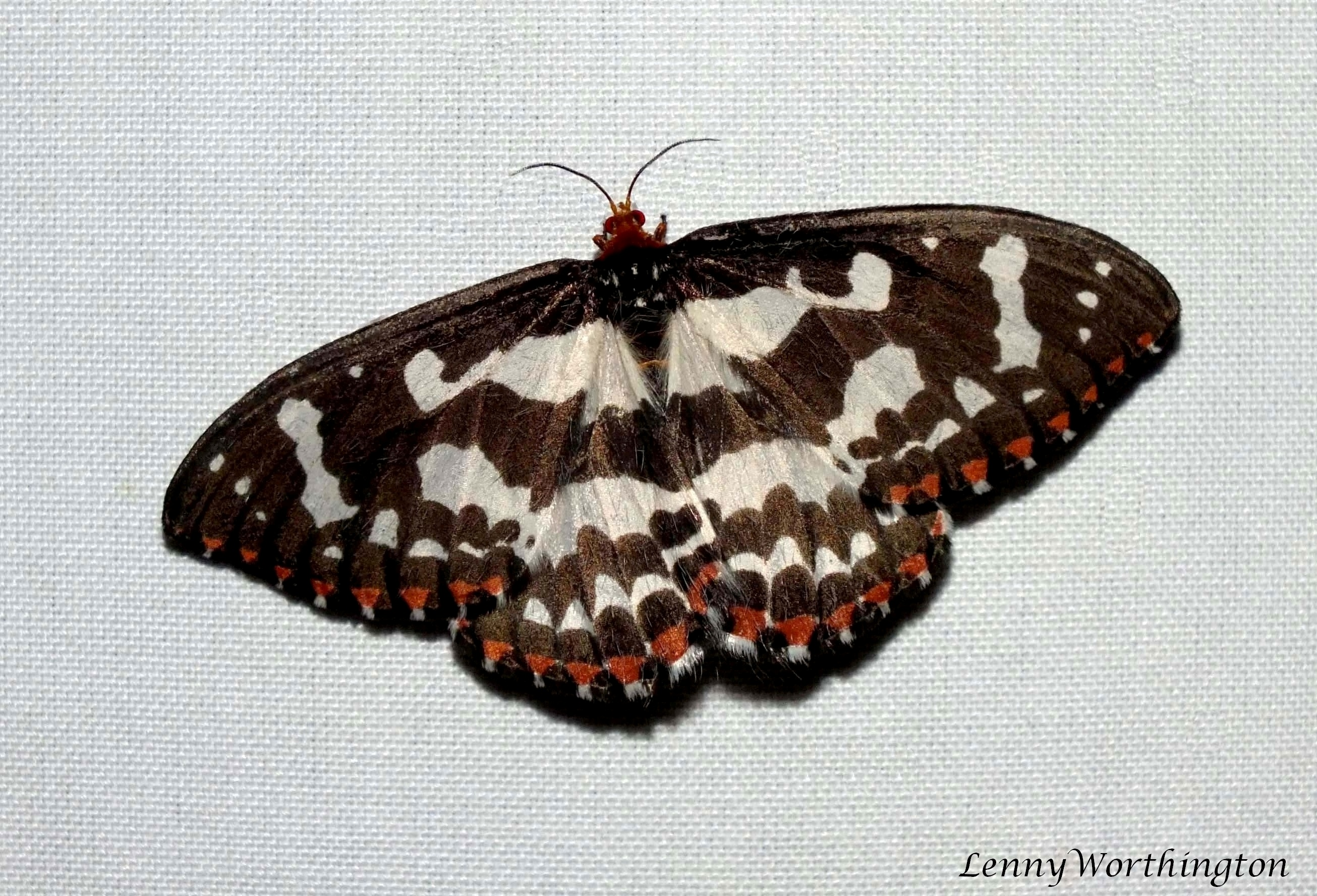

Scientific classification
- Kingdom: Animalia
- Phylum: Arthropoda
- Class: Insecta
- Order: Lepidoptera
- Family: Callidulidae
- Genus: Pterothysanus
- Species: P. laticilia

Binomial name
- Pterothysanus laticilia Walker, 1854

Synonyms
- Pterothysanus orleans Oberthür, 1893; Pterothysanus laticilia f. noblei Swinhoe, 1889; Pterothysanus laticilia f. lanaris Butler

= Pterothysanus laticilia =

Species of moth

Pterothysanus laticilia is a moth of the family Callidulidae. It is found in south-east Asia, including India.
