= Griveaudia atkinsoni =

Scientific classification
- Domain: Eukaryota
- Kingdom: Animalia
- Phylum: Arthropoda
- Class: Insecta
- Order: Lepidoptera
- Family: Callidulidae
- Genus: Griveaudia
- Species: G. atkinsoni

Binomial name
- Griveaudia atkinsoni (Moore, 1879)

Synonyms
- Herimba atkinsoni Moore, 1879

Species of moth

Griveaudia atkinsoni is a moth in the family Callidulidae. It was described by Frederic Moore in 1879. It is found in India, Myanmar and Taiwan.
