= Callidula aruana =

Scientific classification
- Domain: Eukaryota
- Kingdom: Animalia
- Phylum: Arthropoda
- Class: Insecta
- Order: Lepidoptera
- Family: Callidulidae
- Genus: Callidula
- Species: C. aruana

Binomial name
- Callidula aruana (Butler, 1877)

Synonyms
- Cleis aruana Butler, 1877

Species of moth

Callidula aruana is a moth in the family Callidulidae. It was described by Arthur Gardiner Butler in 1877. It is found on Aru of eastern Indonesia.
