= Griveaudia tractiaria =

Scientific classification
- Domain: Eukaryota
- Kingdom: Animalia
- Phylum: Arthropoda
- Class: Insecta
- Order: Lepidoptera
- Family: Callidulidae
- Genus: Griveaudia
- Species: G. tractiaria

Binomial name
- Griveaudia tractiaria (Oberthür, 1893)

Synonyms
- Herimba tractiaria Oberthür, 1893

Species of moth

Griveaudia tractiaria is a moth in the family Callidulidae. It was described by Oberthür in 1893. It is found in Tian Shan.
