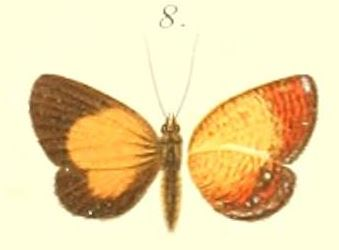

Scientific classification
- Domain: Eukaryota
- Kingdom: Animalia
- Phylum: Arthropoda
- Class: Insecta
- Order: Lepidoptera
- Family: Callidulidae
- Genus: Callidula
- Species: C. miokensis

Binomial name
- Callidula miokensis (Pagenstecher, 1894)

Synonyms
- Cleis miokensis Pagenstecher, 1894

= Callidula miokensis =

Species of moth

Callidula miokensis is a moth of the family Callidulidae. It is found on the Bismarck Archipelago of Papua New Guinea.
