= Callidula erycinoides =

Scientific classification
- Domain: Eukaryota
- Kingdom: Animalia
- Phylum: Arthropoda
- Class: Insecta
- Order: Lepidoptera
- Family: Callidulidae
- Genus: Callidula
- Species: C. erycinoides

Binomial name
- Callidula erycinoides (Felder, 1874)

Synonyms
- Cleis erycinoides Felder, 1874

Species of moth

Callidula erycinoides is a moth in the family Callidulidae. It was described by Felder in 1874. It is found on the Indonesia islands of Ternate, Halhamera and Bacan.
