= Callidula dichroa =

Scientific classification
- Domain: Eukaryota
- Kingdom: Animalia
- Phylum: Arthropoda
- Class: Insecta
- Order: Lepidoptera
- Family: Callidulidae
- Genus: Callidula
- Species: C. dichroa

Binomial name
- Callidula dichroa (Boisduval, 1832)

Synonyms
- Damias dichroa Boisduval, 1832; Cleis dichroa

Species of moth

Callidula dichroa is a moth in the family Callidulidae. It was described by Jean Baptiste Boisduval in 1832. It is found in New Guinea and on Seram and Aru.
