= Callidula jucunda =

Scientific classification
- Domain: Eukaryota
- Kingdom: Animalia
- Phylum: Arthropoda
- Class: Insecta
- Order: Lepidoptera
- Family: Callidulidae
- Genus: Callidula
- Species: C. jucunda

Binomial name
- Callidula jucunda Felder, 1874

Species of moth

Callidula jucunda is a moth of the family Callidulidae. It is endemic to Sundaland, a biogeographical region of Southeastern Asia.
