= Griveaudia vieui =

Scientific classification
- Kingdom: Animalia
- Phylum: Arthropoda
- Class: Insecta
- Order: Lepidoptera
- Family: Callidulidae
- Genus: Griveaudia
- Species: G. vieui

Binomial name
- Griveaudia vieui Viette, 1958

Species of moth

Griveaudia vieui is a species of moth of the family Callidulidae. It is found on Madagascar.
