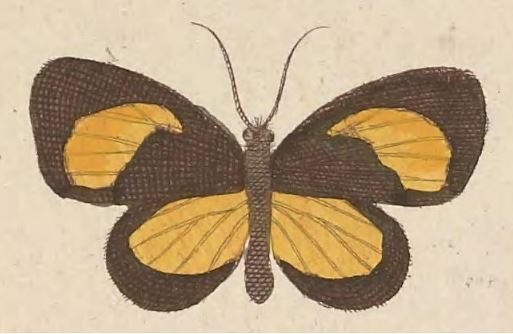

Scientific classification
- Domain: Eukaryota
- Kingdom: Animalia
- Phylum: Arthropoda
- Class: Insecta
- Order: Lepidoptera
- Family: Callidulidae
- Genus: Callidula
- Species: C. plioxantha

Binomial name
- Callidula plioxantha (Kirsch, 1877)

Synonyms
- Cleis plioxantha Kirsch, 1877; Cleis pleioxantha [sic] Kirsch, 1877

= Callidula plioxantha =

Species of moth

Callidula plioxantha is a moth of the family Callidulidae. It is found on New Guinea
