= Callidula sumatrensis =

Scientific classification
- Domain: Eukaryota
- Kingdom: Animalia
- Phylum: Arthropoda
- Class: Insecta
- Order: Lepidoptera
- Family: Callidulidae
- Genus: Callidula
- Species: C. sumatrensis

Binomial name
- Callidula sumatrensis Pagenstecher, 1887

Species of moth

Callidula sumatrensis is a moth of the family Callidulidae. It is found in Sundaland and Thailand. Its habitat consists of lowland forest.

It is a day-flying species.
