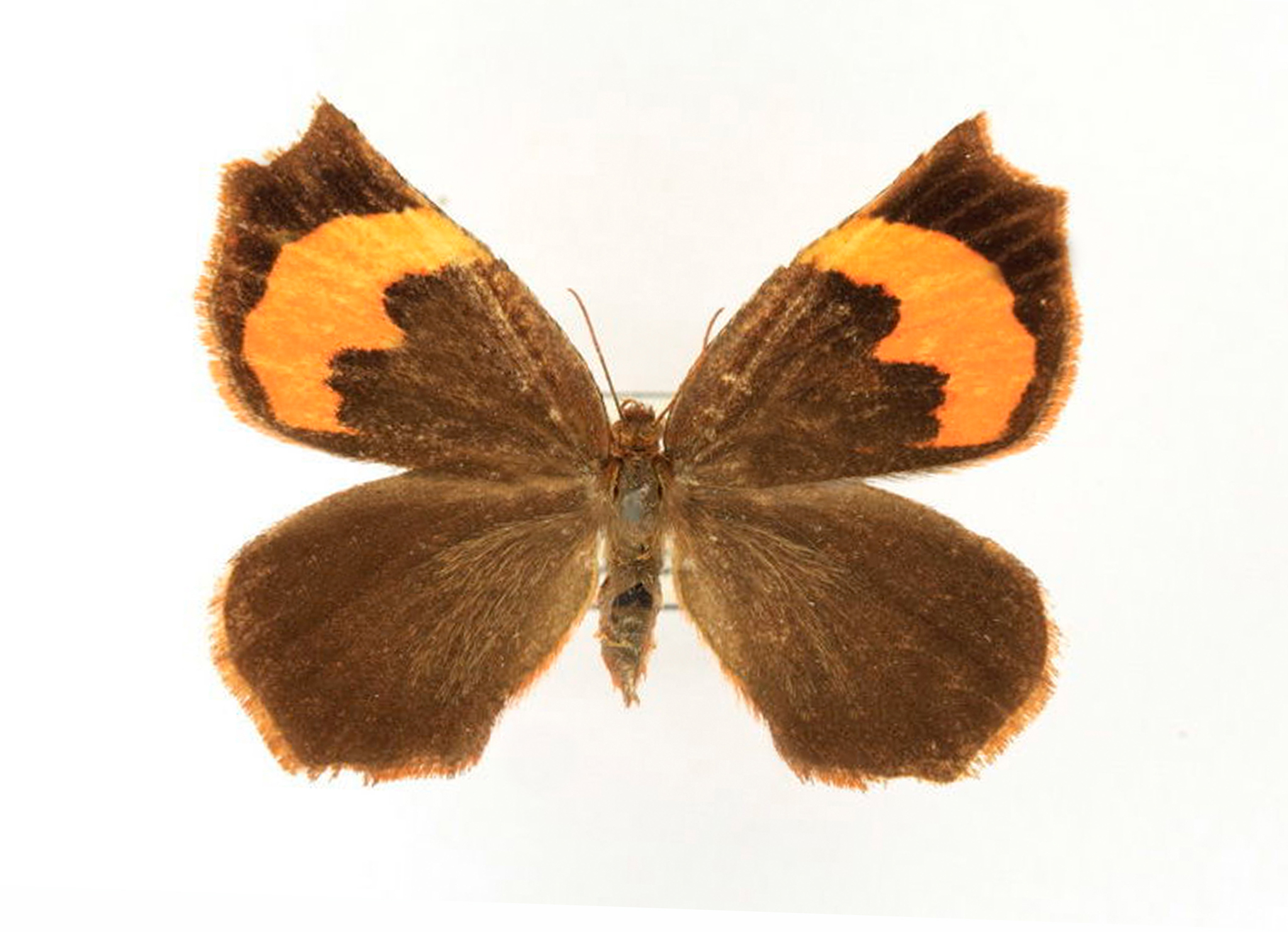

Scientific classification
- Kingdom: Animalia
- Phylum: Arthropoda
- Clade: Pancrustacea
- Class: Insecta
- Order: Lepidoptera
- Family: Callidulidae
- Genus: Pterodecta
- Species: P. felderi

Binomial name
- Pterodecta felderi (Bremer, 1864)

Synonyms
- Callidula felderi Bremer, 1864; Pterodecta gloriosa Butler, 1877; Pterodecta anchora Pagenstecher, 1877

= Pterodecta felderi =

Species of moth

Pterodecta felderi is a moth of the family Callidulidae. It is found in the Russian Far East, Japan, Korean Peninsula, China, Taiwan, and India.

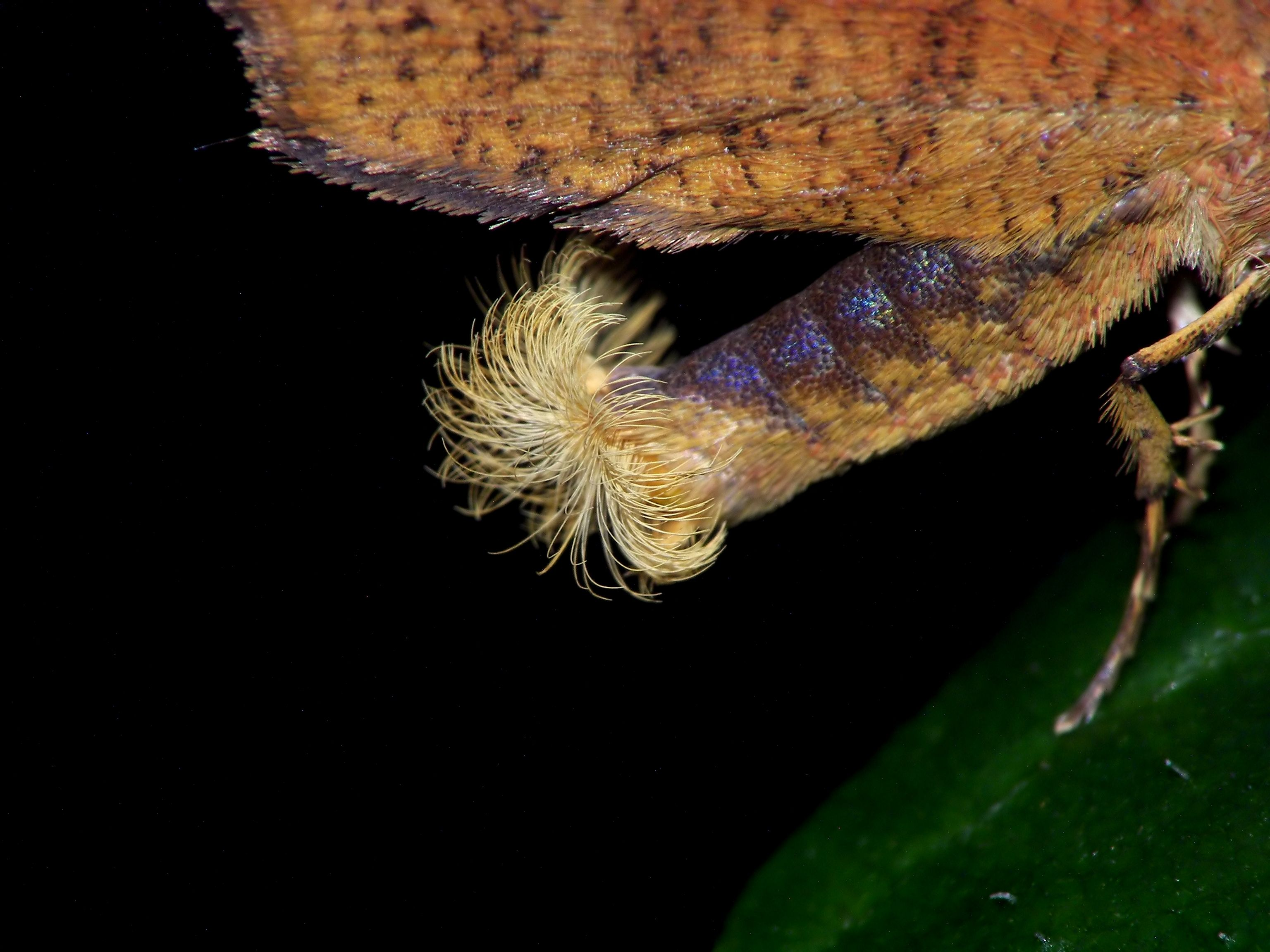
Detail

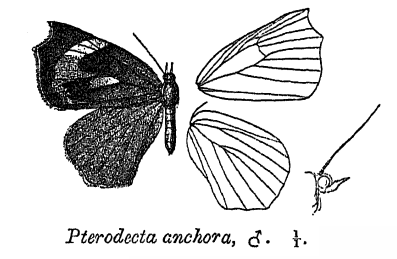
Illustration

The larvae feed on Matteuccia and Osmundastrum species.
