= Callidula petavius =

Scientific classification
- Domain: Eukaryota
- Kingdom: Animalia
- Phylum: Arthropoda
- Class: Insecta
- Order: Lepidoptera
- Family: Callidulidae
- Genus: Callidula
- Species: C. petavius

Binomial name
- Callidula petavius (Stoll, 1781)

Synonyms
- Papilio petavius Stoll, 1781

Species of moth

Callidula petavius is a moth in the family Callidulidae. It is found on Ambon and the southern Moluccas.
