= Caloschemia pulchra =

Scientific classification
- Kingdom: Animalia
- Phylum: Arthropoda
- Class: Insecta
- Order: Lepidoptera
- Family: Callidulidae
- Genus: Caloschemia
- Species: C. pulchra

Binomial name
- Caloschemia pulchra (Butler, 1878)

Synonyms
- Helicomitra pulchra Butler, 1878; Caloschemia monilifera Mabille, 1879

Species of moth

Caloschemia pulchra is a species of moth of the family Callidulidae. It is found in Madagascar.
