= Comella laetifica =

Scientific classification
- Domain: Eukaryota
- Kingdom: Animalia
- Phylum: Arthropoda
- Class: Insecta
- Order: Lepidoptera
- Family: Callidulidae
- Genus: Comella
- Species: C. laetifica

Binomial name
- Comella laetifica (C. & R. Felder, 1860)

Synonyms
- Tyndaris laetifica C. & R. Felder, 1860; Callidula erycinata Walker, [1865]; Comella laetifica ab. astigmata Seitz, 1924; Comella laetifica ab. masculina Seitz, 1924

Species of moth

Comella laetifica is a moth in the family Callidulidae. It is found on Aru and in New Guinea.
