= Callidula lata =

Scientific classification
- Domain: Eukaryota
- Kingdom: Animalia
- Phylum: Arthropoda
- Class: Insecta
- Order: Lepidoptera
- Family: Callidulidae
- Genus: Callidula
- Species: C. lata

Binomial name
- Callidula lata (Pagenstecher, 1887)

Synonyms
- Damias lata Pagenstecher, 1887

Species of moth

Callidula lata is a moth in the family Callidulidae. It is found on Bacan in Indonesia.
