= Callidula arctata =

Scientific classification
- Kingdom: Animalia
- Phylum: Arthropoda
- Clade: Pancrustacea
- Class: Insecta
- Order: Lepidoptera
- Family: Callidulidae
- Genus: Callidula
- Species: C. arctata

Binomial name
- Callidula arctata (Butler, 1877)

Synonyms
- Cleis arctata Butler, 1877; Damias angustifasciata Röber, 1891

Species of moth

Callidula arctata is a moth in the family Callidulidae. It was described by Arthur Gardiner Butler in 1877. It is found in Papua New Guinea.
