= Callidula oceanitis =

Scientific classification
- Domain: Eukaryota
- Kingdom: Animalia
- Phylum: Arthropoda
- Class: Insecta
- Order: Lepidoptera
- Family: Callidulidae
- Genus: Callidula
- Species: C. oceanitis

Binomial name
- Callidula oceanitis (Joicey & Talbot, 1916)

Synonyms
- Cleis oceanitis Joicey & Talbot, 1916

Species of moth

Callidula oceanitis is a moth in the family Callidulidae. It is found on the Schouten Islands.

The length of the forewings is about 16 mm. The ground colour of the forewings is black-brown with a large rounded golden-yellow patch. The hindwings are also black-brown with a golden-yellow patch.
