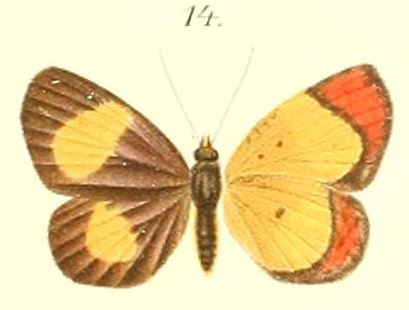

Scientific classification
- Domain: Eukaryota
- Kingdom: Animalia
- Phylum: Arthropoda
- Class: Insecta
- Order: Lepidoptera
- Family: Callidulidae
- Genus: Callidula
- Species: C. hypoleuca

Binomial name
- Callidula hypoleuca Butler, 1887

Synonyms
- Cleis hypoleuca

= Callidula hypoleuca =

Species of moth

Callidula hypoleuca is a moth of the family Callidulidae. It is found on the Bismarck Archipelago of Papua New Guinea.
