= Griveaudia discothyrata =

Scientific classification
- Domain: Eukaryota
- Kingdom: Animalia
- Phylum: Arthropoda
- Class: Insecta
- Order: Lepidoptera
- Family: Callidulidae
- Genus: Griveaudia
- Species: G. discothyrata

Binomial name
- Griveaudia discothyrata (Poujade, 1895)

Synonyms
- Erateina discothyrata Poujade, 1895

Species of moth

Griveaudia discothyrata is a moth in the family Callidulidae. It was described by Gustave Poujade in 1895. It is found in western China.
