= Callidula nigresce =

Scientific classification
- Domain: Eukaryota
- Kingdom: Animalia
- Phylum: Arthropoda
- Class: Insecta
- Order: Lepidoptera
- Family: Callidulidae
- Genus: Callidula
- Species: C. nigresce

Binomial name
- Callidula nigresce (Butler, 1887)

Synonyms
- Cleis nigresce Butler, 1887

Species of moth

Callidula nigresce is a moth in the family Callidulidae. It is found on the Solomon Islands.
