= Pterothysanus atratus =

Scientific classification
- Domain: Eukaryota
- Kingdom: Animalia
- Phylum: Arthropoda
- Class: Insecta
- Order: Lepidoptera
- Family: Callidulidae
- Genus: Pterothysanus
- Species: P. atratus

Binomial name
- Pterothysanus atratus Butler, 1885

Species of moth

Pterothysanus atratus is a moth in the family Callidulidae. It was described by Arthur Gardiner Butler in 1885. It is found in Assam, India.
