= Tetragonus lycaenoides =

Scientific classification
- Domain: Eukaryota
- Kingdom: Animalia
- Phylum: Arthropoda
- Class: Insecta
- Order: Lepidoptera
- Family: Callidulidae
- Genus: Tetragonus
- Species: T. lycaenoides

Binomial name
- Tetragonus lycaenoides (Felder, 1874)

Synonyms
- Agonis lycaenoides Felder, 1874

Species of moth

Tetragonus lycaenoides is a moth of the family Callidulidae. It is found in Sulawesi, Borneo, Peninsular Malaysia, Sumatra and Nias.
