= Callidula posticalis =

Scientific classification
- Kingdom: Animalia
- Phylum: Arthropoda
- Clade: Pancrustacea
- Class: Insecta
- Order: Lepidoptera
- Family: Callidulidae
- Genus: Callidula
- Species: C. posticalis

Binomial name
- Callidula posticalis (Guérin-Méneville, [1831])

Synonyms
- Cleis posticalis Guérin-Méneville, [1831]

Species of moth

Callidula posticalis is a moth in the family Callidulidae. It is found on New Ireland in Papua New Guinea.
