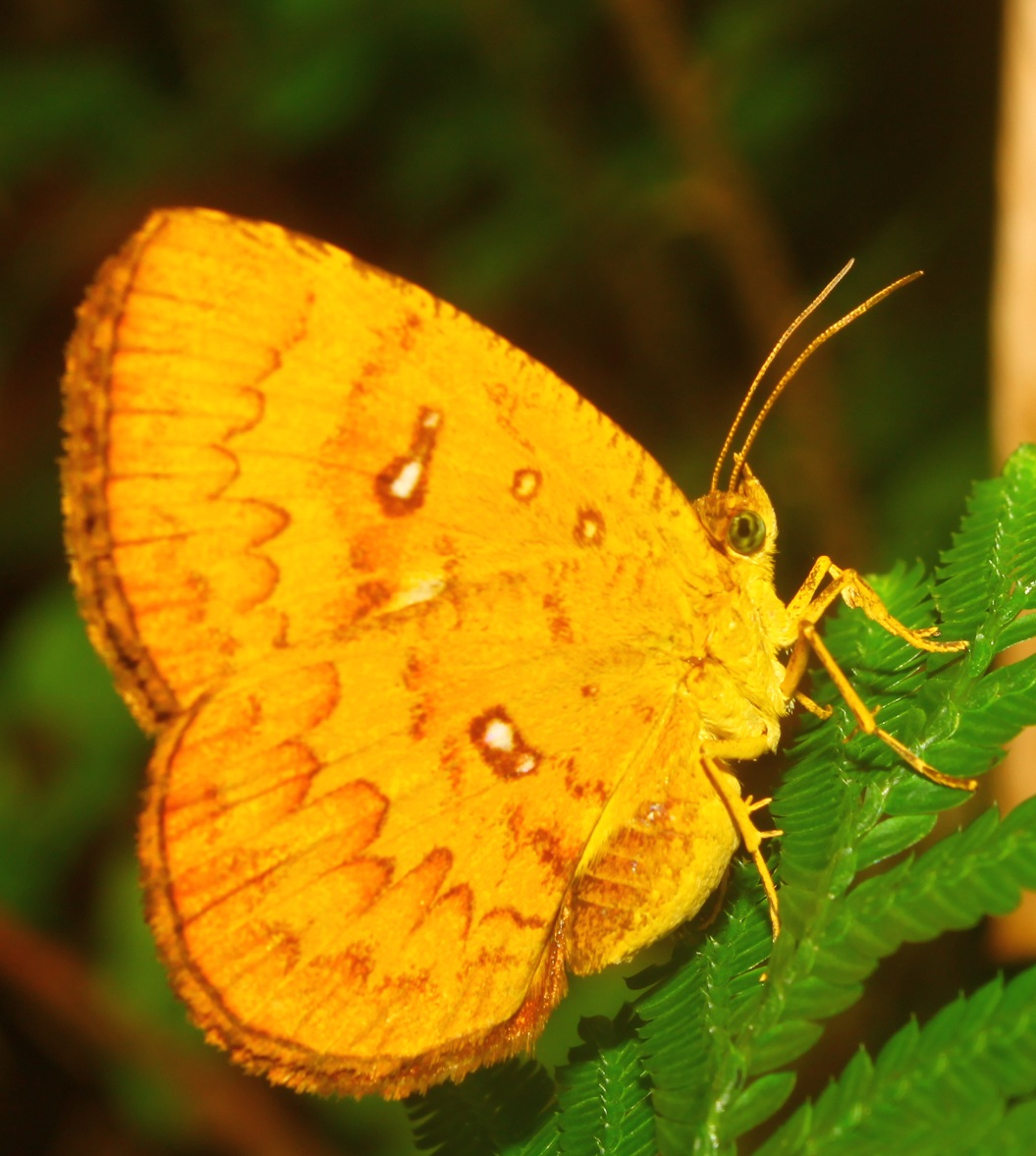

Scientific classification
- Domain: Eukaryota
- Kingdom: Animalia
- Phylum: Arthropoda
- Class: Insecta
- Order: Lepidoptera
- Family: Callidulidae
- Genus: Callidula
- Species: C. evander

Binomial name
- Callidula evander (Stoll, 1780)

Synonyms
- Papilio evander Stoll, [1780]

= Callidula evander =

Species of moth

Callidula evander is a moth in the family Callidulidae. It is found on New Guinea and several surrounding islands.
