= Griveaudia =

Scientific classification
- Kingdom: Animalia
- Phylum: Arthropoda
- Class: Insecta
- Order: Lepidoptera
- Family: Callidulidae
- Subfamily: Griveaudiinae
- Genus: Griveaudia; Viette, 1958

Species
- See text

Genus of moths

Griveaudia is a genus of moths of the family Callidulidae.

== Species ==
- Griveaudia atkinsoni Moore, 1879
- Griveaudia charlesi Viette, 1968
- Griveaudia discothyrata Poujade, 1895
- Griveaudia nigropuncta Leech, 1898
- Griveaudia nigropuncta Viette, 1958
- Griveaudia tractiaria Oberthür, 1893
- Griveaudia vieui Viette, 1958
