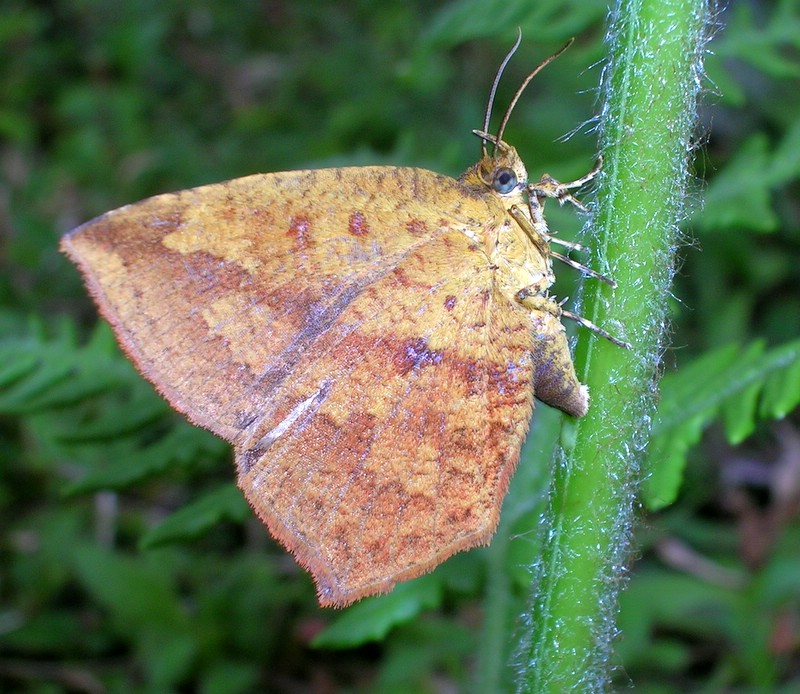
- Tetragonus catamitus

Scientific classification
- Domain: Eukaryota
- Kingdom: Animalia
- Phylum: Arthropoda
- Class: Insecta
- Order: Lepidoptera
- Family: Callidulidae
- Genus: Tetragonus; Geyer, 1832

= Tetragonus =

Genus of moths

Tetragonus is a genus of moths of the family Callidulidae.

== Species ==
- Tetragonus catamitus Geyer, 1832
- Tetragonus lycaenoides (Felder, 1874)
