= Griveaudia nigropuncta =

Scientific classification
- Domain: Eukaryota
- Kingdom: Animalia
- Phylum: Arthropoda
- Class: Insecta
- Order: Lepidoptera
- Family: Callidulidae
- Genus: Griveaudia
- Species: G. nigropuncta

Binomial name
- Griveaudia nigropuncta (Leech, 1898)

Synonyms
- Herimba nigropuncta Leech, 1898

Species of moth

Griveaudia nigropuncta is a species of moth of the family Callidulidae. It is found in Asia.
