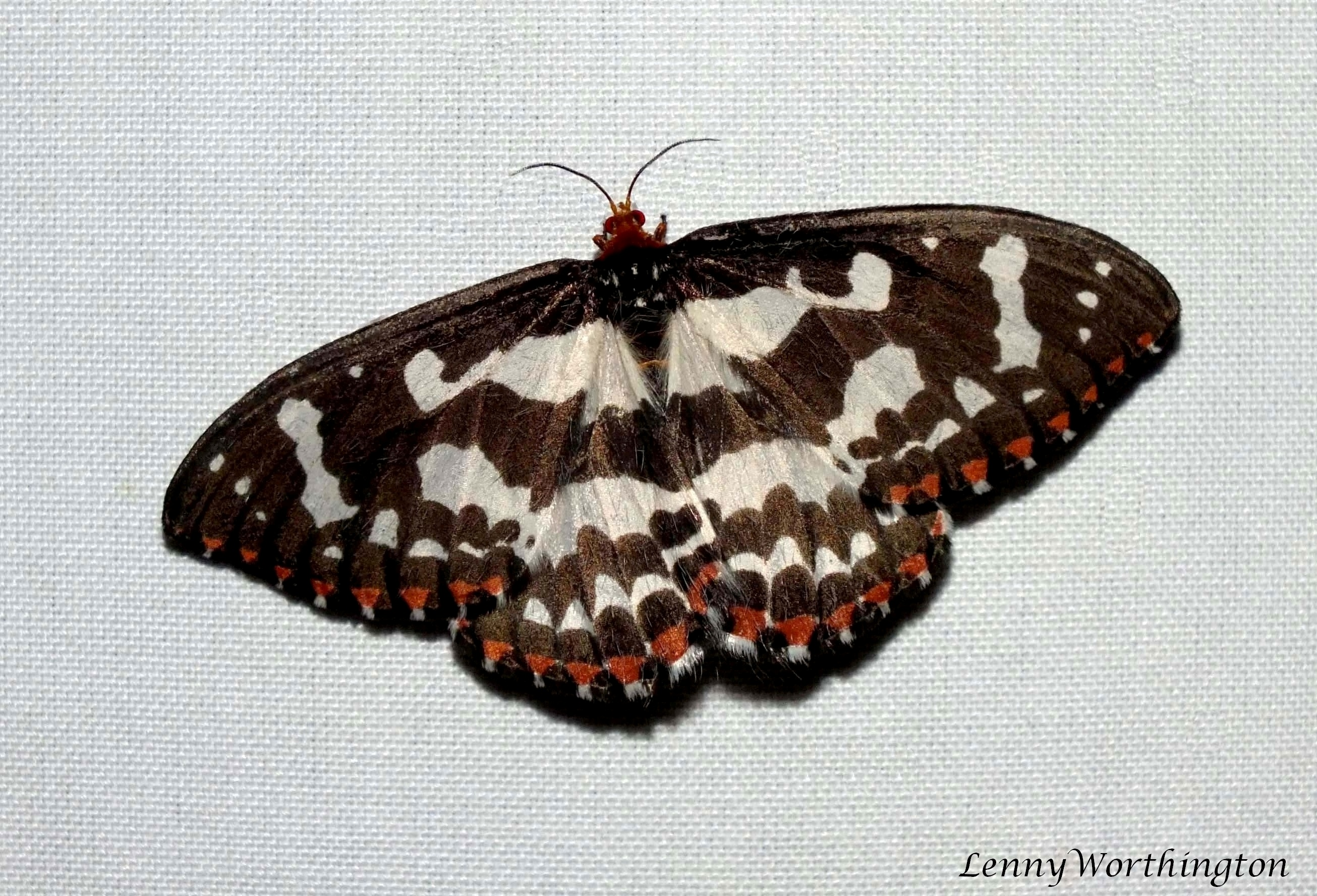
- Pterothysanus laticilia

Scientific classification
- Kingdom: Animalia
- Phylum: Arthropoda
- Class: Insecta
- Order: Lepidoptera
- Family: Callidulidae
- Genus: Pterothysanus; Walker, 1854

= Pterothysanus =

Genus of moths

Pterothysanus is a genus of moths of the family Callidulidae.

== Species ==
- Pterothysanus atratus Butler, 1885
- Pterothysanus laticilia Walker, 1854
- Pterothysanus pictus Butler, 1884
