= Caloschemia =

Scientific classification
- Kingdom: Animalia
- Phylum: Arthropoda
- Class: Insecta
- Order: Lepidoptera
- Family: Callidulidae
- Subfamily: Pterothysaninae
- Genus: Caloschemia; Mabille, 1878

Synonyms
- Helicomitra Butler, 1878

Genus of moths

Caloschemia is a genus of moths of the family Callidulidae.

== Species ==
- Caloschemia pulchra (Butler, 1878)
