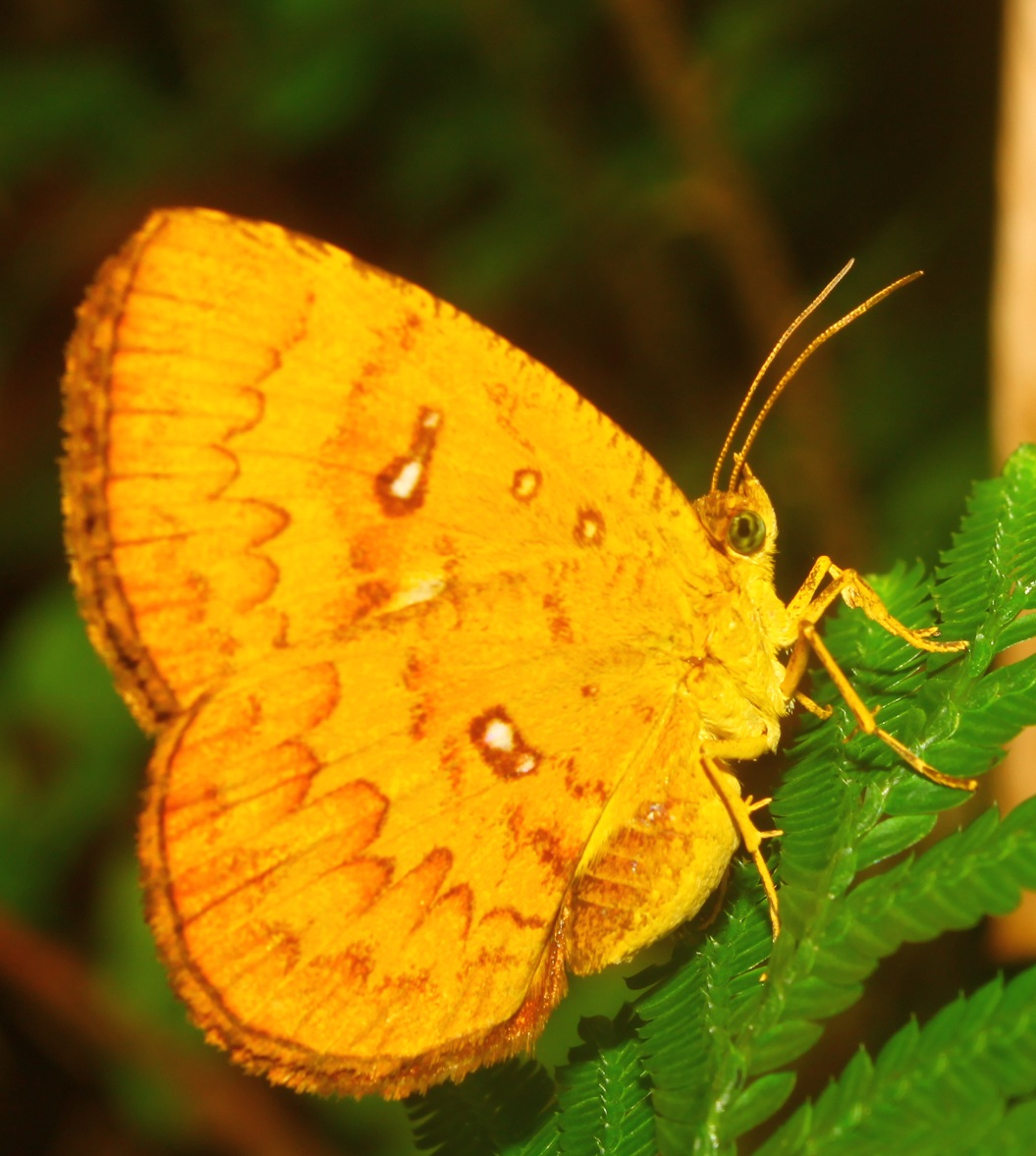
- Callidula evander

Scientific classification
- Kingdom: Animalia
- Phylum: Arthropoda
- Clade: Pancrustacea
- Class: Insecta
- Order: Lepidoptera
- Family: Callidulidae
- Subfamily: Callidulinae
- Genus: Callidula; Hübner, [1819]

Synonyms
- Cleis Guérin-Méneville, [1831]; Datanga Moore, 1879; Petavia Horsfield, [1828]

= Callidula =

Genus of moths

Callidula is a genus of moths of the family Callidulidae. It holds a strong resemblance to another genus in the Lepidoptera Order, that being Pterodecta.

== Behaviour ==
These butterfly-moths are most often seen in May, and the least seen in September.

== Distribution ==
This genus of butterfly-moths is exclusive to East and Southeastern parts of Asia. The countries it inhabits are as follows: Philippines, Malaysia, Japan, Papua New Guinea, China, Nepal, Thailand, Laos, and Taiwan.

== Species ==
- Callidula arctata (Butler, 1877)
- Callidula aruana (Butler, 1877)
- Callidula atata (Swinhoe, 1909)
- Callidula aureola (Swinhoe, 1905)
- Callidula biplagiata (Butler, 1887)
- Callidula dichroa (Boisduval, 1832)
- Callidula erycinoides (Felder, 1874)
- Callidula evander (Stoll, [1780])
- Callidula fasciata (Butler, 1877)
- Callidula hypoleuca Butler, 1887
- Callidula jucunda Felder, 1874
- Callidula kobesi Holloway, 1998
- Callidula lata (Pagenstecher, 1887)
- Callidula lunigera Butler, 1879
- Callidula miokensis (Pagenstecher, 1884)
- Callidula nenia Druce, 1888
- Callidula nigresce (Butler, 1887)
- Callidula oceanitis (Joicey & Talbot, 1916)
- Callidula petavius (Stoll, 1781)
- Callidula plagalis (Felder, 1874)
- Callidula plioxantha (Kirsch, 1877)
- Callidula posticalis (Guérin-Méneville, [1831])
- Callidula propinqua (Butler, 1877)
- Callidula sakuni (Horsfield, [1828])
- Callidula sumatrensis Pagenstecher, 1887
- Callidula versicolor (Felder, 1874)
- Callidula waterstradti Holloway, 1998
