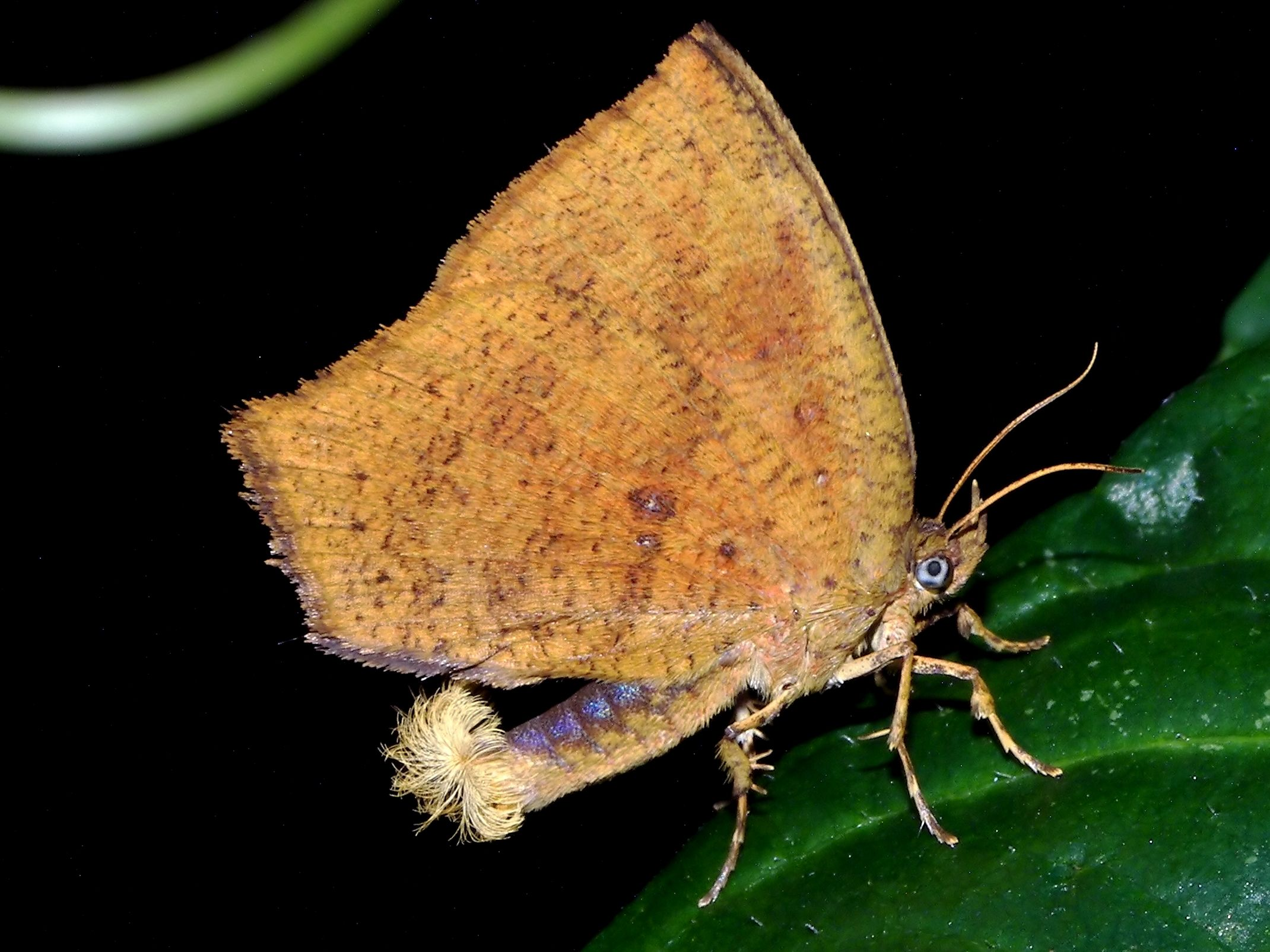
- Pterodecta felderi

Scientific classification
- Kingdom: Animalia
- Phylum: Arthropoda
- Class: Insecta
- Order: Lepidoptera
- Family: Callidulidae
- Subfamily: Callidulinae
- Genus: Pterodecta; Butler, 1877

= Pterodecta =

Genus of moths

Pterodecta is a genus of moths of the family Callidulidae. This genus is often confused with another genus in the order Lepidoptera, named Callidula. This genus' name in Chinese is 锚纹蛾属, (pronounced Aw-vyu-lair-iya)

== Behaviour ==
These insects live in high-altitude mountainous areas and fly throughout the day. They are most often seen in July, October, and May in that order.

== Appearance ==
These insects have yellow/orange wings, with some specific species also having black.

== Distribution ==
Pterodecta is most commonly found throughout India, China, Japan, and Taiwan.

== Species ==
- Pterodecta felderi (Bremer, 1864)
