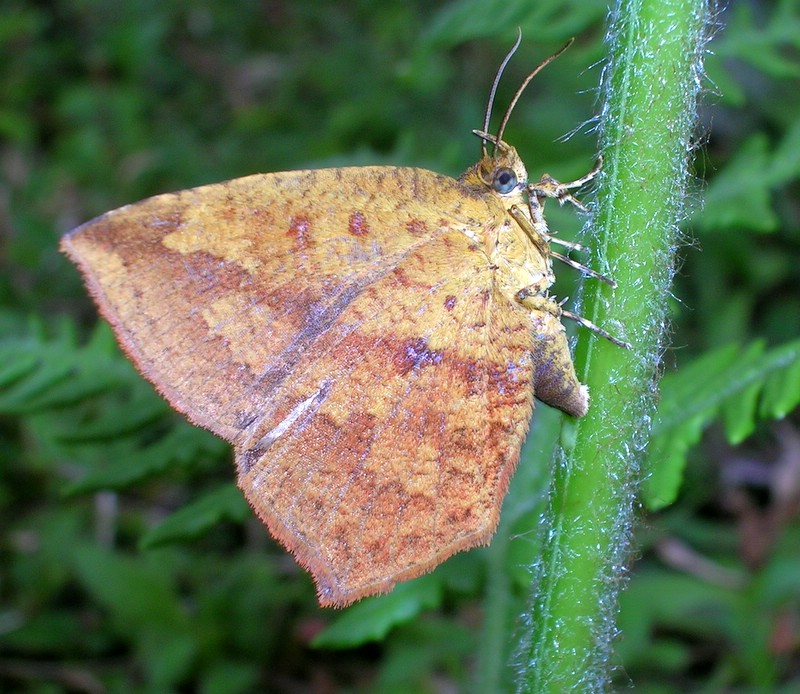
- From the Western Ghats

Scientific classification
- Kingdom: Animalia
- Phylum: Arthropoda
- Clade: Pancrustacea
- Class: Insecta
- Order: Lepidoptera
- Family: Callidulidae
- Genus: Tetragonus
- Species: T. catamitus

Binomial name
- Tetragonus catamitus Geyer, 1832

Synonyms
- Cleosiris fasciata Moore, 1883

= Tetragonus catamitus =

Common butterfly moth

Species of moth

Tetragonus catamitus, the common butterfly moth, or Philippine callidulid moth, is a moth of the family Callidulidae. It was first described by Carl Geyer in 1832. Noted from Taiwan, north-eastern India, south-west India, the Andaman and Nicobar Islands, Sri Lanka, the Tenasserim Hills of Myanmar and from Java. They are day-flying moths that can be easily mistaken for a butterfly due to the position in which they hold their wings.

== Description ==
The head, thorax and abdomen are dark yellowish and reddish brown. The wings are yellowish and reddish brown. The hindwings are more uniform reddish brown. On the underside, there are dark striations and both the forewing and hindwing have three grey spots in the discal cell. There are four pale rufous bands along the medial, postmedial, submarginal region.

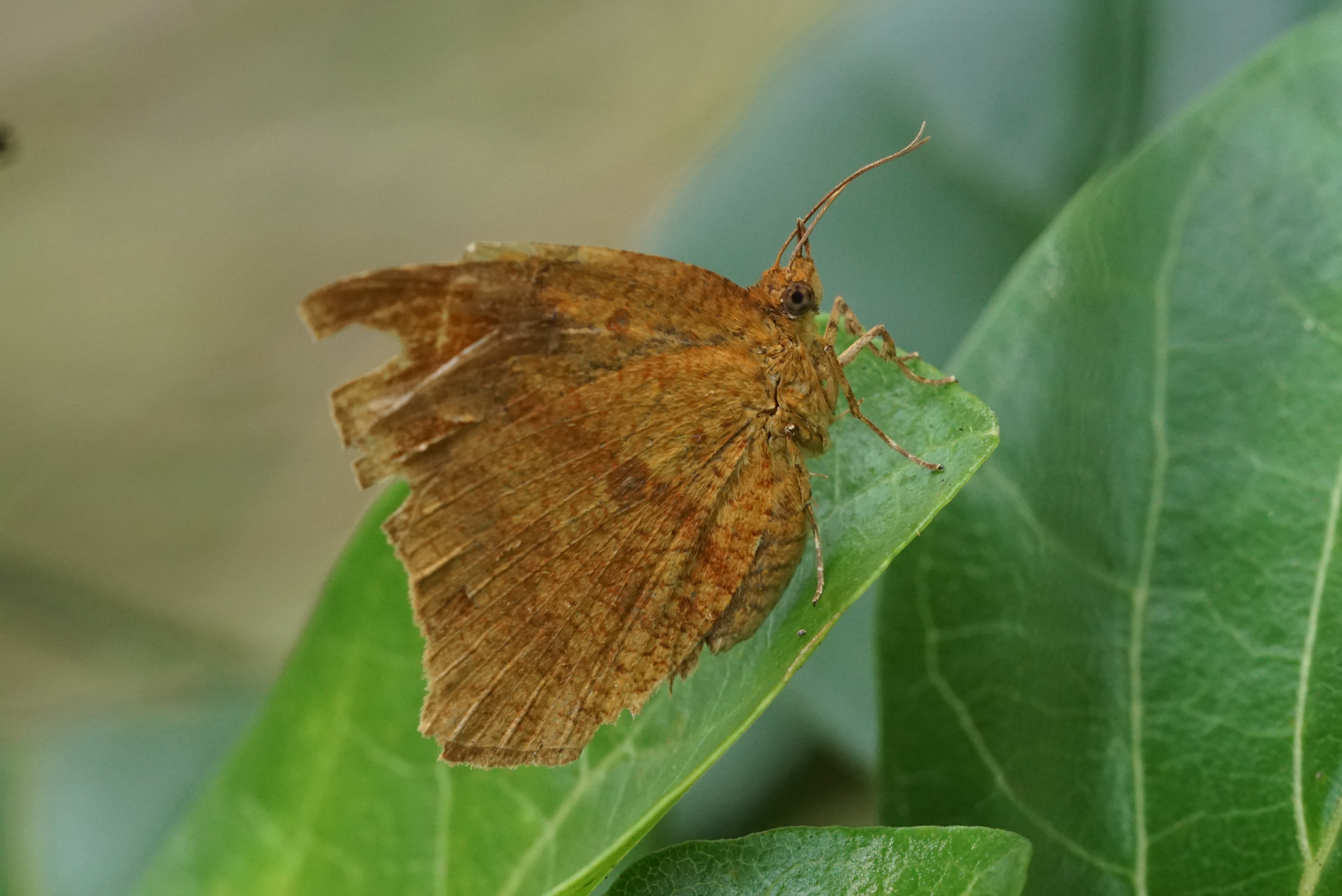

== Taxonomy ==
The species was named Tetragonus catamitus by Carl Geyer in 1832 based on a specimen from Java and later described under the name of Cleosiris fasciata by Frederic Moore. The larvae were described later as being translucent green with a dark black semi-prognathous head and a prothorax with a well-developed prothoracic shield. Young instar larvae live in a rolled leaf, and the mature larvae live between leaves drawn together with silk.

== Range ==
This species ranges throughout the east and south-east Asian lowland of seasonal or tropical forests where the host fern species are abundant. Kobes (1990) recognized three subspecies, but Holloway (1998) treated all of them as the junior synonyms of the nominotypical subspecies and indicated there is great variation in size and colouration.

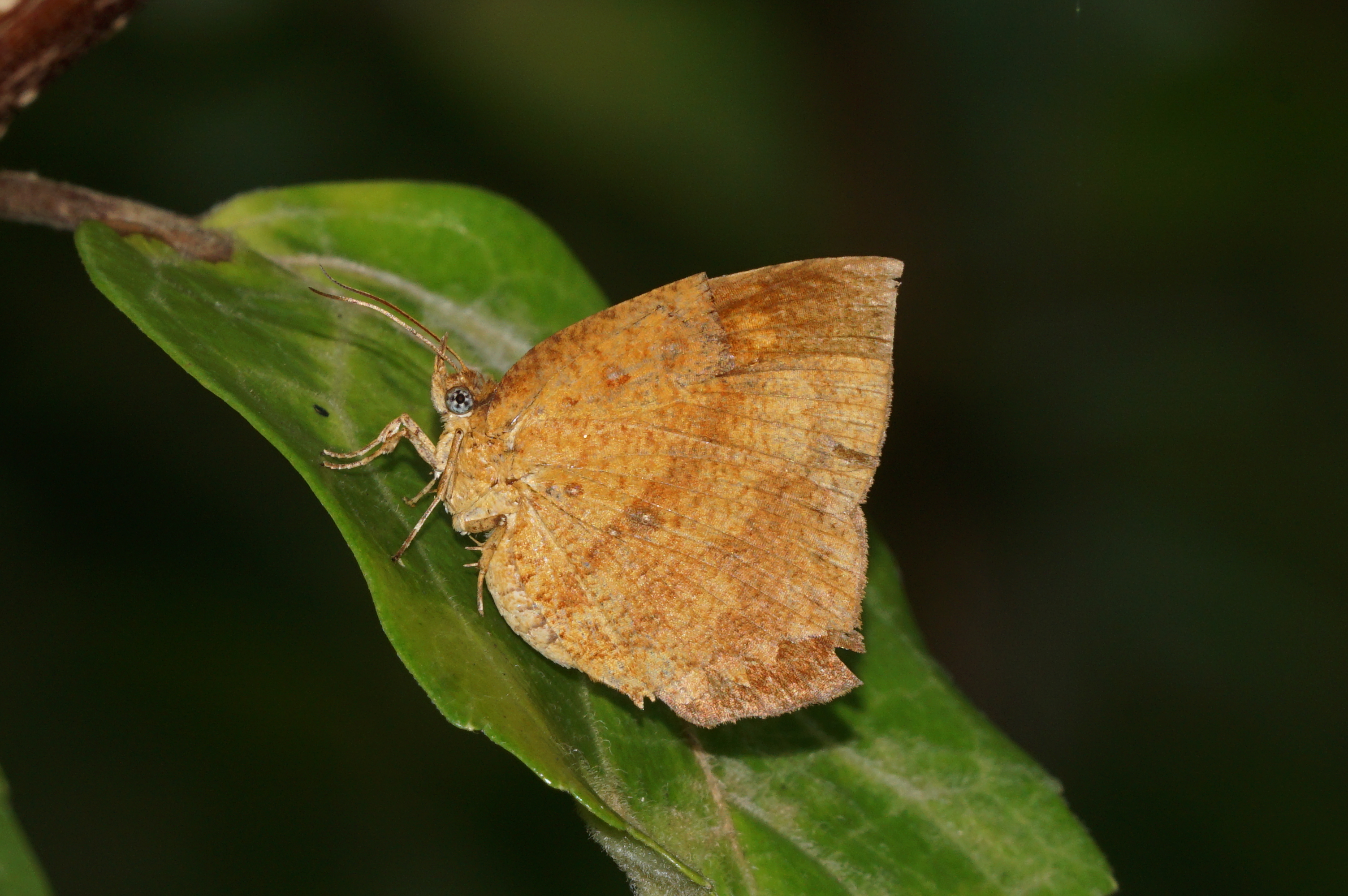

== Habitat and ecology ==
This species occurs in lowland forests, along the boggy areas where the feeding and host plants are dense. Shady, bushy habitats are preferable in day time but unusually can see outside the habitats. Rainy conditions, just after evening dark lights or early mornings are the most active time.

== Host plants ==
August to October is the peak breeding season. The larvae feed on ferns Drynaria and Pteridium species. In Taiwan, it was reared from the fern Pteridium aquilinum (L.) Kuhn subsp. latiusculum (Desv.).
