= Victor Comella Ferreres =

Víctor Ferreres Comella or Victor Comella Ferreres is a Spanish professor and author of Law, having been Visiting Professor at University of Texas at Austin in the United States and currently Senior Lecturer at Pompeu Fabra University in Barcelona, Spain, and also a published author of publications and books, being widely collected by libraries worldwide.
