= Michele Comella =

Italian painter (1856–1926)

Michele Comella (September 27, 1856 – May 27, 1926) was an Italian painter, mainly of landscapes. He was also a photographer.

He initially trained at Naples, at the Institute of Fine Arts, but soon returned to his native Casaluce, where he painted landscapes with genre scenes of daily life. He also participated in the decoration of the Chapel of San Luciano in the parish church of the Assunta in Lusciano, depicting Glory of the Saint in fresco and four tondi likely depicting the four virtues. He sent Regi laghi di Carditello to the 1889 Mostra at Genoa; Triste vedovanze to the 1891-1892 National Exposition of Palermo; 1904, Dolore to the 1904 Neapolitan Promotrice of Salvator Rosa; and La modella preferita along with Le filatrici to the same exhibition in 1906.
