= Comella =

Scientific classification
- Domain: Eukaryota
- Kingdom: Animalia
- Phylum: Arthropoda
- Class: Insecta
- Order: Lepidoptera
- Family: Callidulidae
- Subfamily: Callidulinae
- Genus: Comella; Pagenstecher, 1902

Synonyms
- Tyndaris C. & R. Felder, 1860 (preocc. Thompson, 1857)

Genus of moths

Comella is a genus of moths of the family Callidulidae.

== Species ==
- Comella insularis Joicey & Talbot, 1916
- Comella laetifica (C. & R. Felder, 1860)
