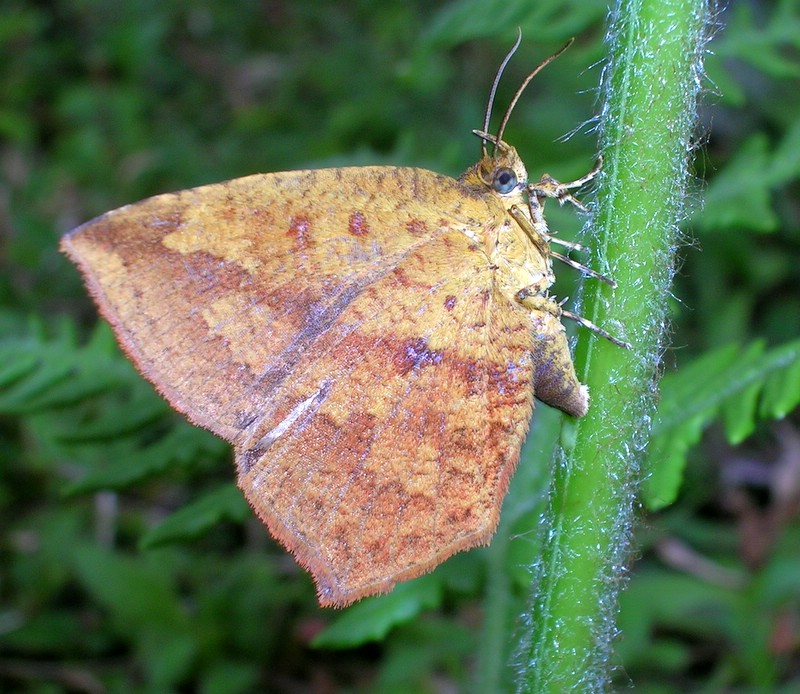
- A callidulid moth Tetragonus catamitus laying eggs on a fern in the Western Ghats.

Scientific classification
- Kingdom: Animalia
- Phylum: Arthropoda
- Clade: Pancrustacea
- Class: Insecta
- Order: Lepidoptera
- Clade: Eulepidoptera
- Clade: Ditrysia
- Clade: Apoditrysia
- Clade: Obtectomera
- Superfamily: Calliduloidea
- Family: Callidulidae; Moore, 1877

Subfamilies and genera
- Pterothysaninae Minet 1987: Caloschemia; =Helicomitra; Pterothysanus; Griveaudiinae Minet, 1990: Griveaudia; Callidulinae: Callidula; =Petavia; =Datanga; =Cleis; Comella; Pterodecta; Tetragonus; =Agonis

Diversity
- About 60 species

= Callidulidae =

Family of Old World butterfly-moths

Callidulidae, the only known family of the superfamily Calliduloidea, is the family of Old World butterfly-moths, containing eight genera. They have a peculiar distribution, restricted to the Old World tropics of Southeast Asia to Australasia and Madagascar. The three subfamilies exhibit both day- and night-flying behaviour.

The mainly day-flying Callidulinae can be distinguished by their resting posture, which is the most butterfly-like, with the wings held closely over the back. Resembling the butterfly family Lycaenidae, these moths can be told apart by their antennae which taper to a point or may be very subtly clubbed. The more often night-flying Pterothysaninae and Griveaudiinae have a different adult resting posture (the latter roof-like in repose) and these were not placed within the Callidulidae until recently.

Biology of most subfamilies and species is poorly known. Eggs are very flat in Griveaudiinae and Callidulinae, and caterpillars of Callidulinae are green with a shiny black head and have only been reported from ferns forming a leaf roll in which they live, eat and finally pupate, while the pupa of Helicomitra appears to be subterranean.

The closest relatives of Callidulidae are not known, but they are currently placed in a group that includes the three butterfly superfamilies, the "hook-tip moths" Drepanoidea and the "geometer moths" Geometroidea and also possibly Axioidea which share some structural characteristics.

== Other references ==
- Minet, J. (1990 [1989]). Nouvelles frontières, géographiques et taxonomiques, pour la famille des Callidulidae (Lepidoptera, Calliduloidea). Nouvelle Revue d'Entomologie (N.S.) 6(4): 351–368.
- Maddison, David R. 2003. Callidulidae. in The Tree of Life Web Project, Accessed October 2006
- O'Toole, Christopher (Ed.) (2002) Firefly Encyclopedia of Insects and Spiders. ISBN 1-55297-612-2
