= Micronaclia =

Scientific classification
- Kingdom: Animalia
- Phylum: Arthropoda
- Class: Insecta
- Order: Lepidoptera
- Superfamily: Noctuoidea
- Family: Erebidae
- Subfamily: Arctiinae
- Tribe: Syntomini
- Genus: Micronaclia; Hampson, 1898

Genus of moths

Micronaclia is a genus of moths in the subfamily Arctiinae. The genus was erected by George Hampson in 1898.

== Species ==
- Micronaclia imaitsia Griveaud, 1964
- Micronaclia mimetica Griveaud, 1964
- Micronaclia rubrivittata Gaede, 1926
- Micronaclia simplex (Butler, 1879)

== Formerly placed here ==
- Micronaclia eleonora Oberthür
- Micronaclia muscella
- Micronaclia severina Oberthür
- Micronaclia tenera

== Status unclear ==
- Micronaclia purpusilla Mabille
