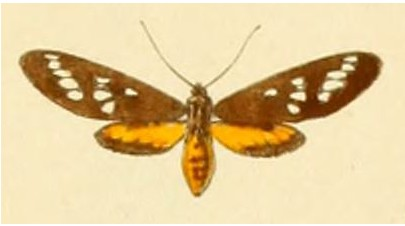

Scientific classification
- Kingdom: Animalia
- Phylum: Arthropoda
- Class: Insecta
- Order: Lepidoptera
- Superfamily: Noctuoidea
- Family: Erebidae
- Subfamily: Arctiinae
- Tribe: Syntomini
- Genus: Maculonaclia; Griveaud, 1964

= Maculonaclia =

Genus of moths

Maculonaclia is a genus of moths in the subfamily Arctiinae. The genus was erected by Paul Griveaud in 1964.

== Species ==
Some species of this genus are:

- Maculonaclia altitudina Griveaud, 1964
- Maculonaclia ankasoka Griveaud, 1964
- Maculonaclia bicolor (Rothschild, 1911)
- Maculonaclia bicolorata Griveaud, 1967
- Maculonaclia brevipennis Griveaud, 1964
- Maculonaclia buntzae Griveaud, 1964
- Maculonaclia delicata Griveaud, 1964
- Maculonaclia dentata Griveaud, 1964
- Maculonaclia douquettae Griveaud, 1973
- Maculonaclia elongata Griveaud, 1964
- Maculonaclia flamea Griveaud, 1967
- Maculonaclia florida (de Joannis, 1906)
- Maculonaclia griveaudi Viette, 1987
- Maculonaclia grjebinei Griveaud, 1964
- Maculonaclia itsikiorya Griveaud, 1969
- Maculonaclia lambertoni Griveaud, 1964
- Maculonaclia leopardina (Rothschild, 1911)
- Maculonaclia lokoba Griveaud, 1964
- Maculonaclia matsabory Griveaud, 1967
- Maculonaclia minuscula Griveaud, 1973
- Maculonaclia muscella (Mabille, 1884)
- Maculonaclia nigrita Griveaud, 1964
- Maculonaclia obliqua Griveaud, 1964
- Maculonaclia obscura Griveaud, 1967
- Maculonaclia parvifenestrata Griveaud, 1964
- Maculonaclia petrusia Griveaud, 1967
- Maculonaclia sanctamaria Griveaud, 1964
- Maculonaclia tampoketsya Griveaud, 1969
- Maculonaclia tenera (Mabille, 1879)
- Maculonaclia truncata Griveaud, 1964
- Maculonaclia viettei Griveaud, 1964

== Former species ==
- Maculonaclia agatha (Oberthür, 1893)
