= Maculonaclia itsikiorya =

Scientific classification
- Domain: Eukaryota
- Kingdom: Animalia
- Phylum: Arthropoda
- Class: Insecta
- Order: Lepidoptera
- Superfamily: Noctuoidea
- Family: Erebidae
- Subfamily: Arctiinae
- Genus: Maculonaclia
- Species: M. itsikiorya

Binomial name
- Maculonaclia itsikiorya Griveaud, 1969

Species of moth

Maculonaclia itsikiorya is a moth of the subfamily Arctiinae first described by Paul Griveaud in 1969. It is found in eastern Madagascar.

This species has a wingspan of 22 mm. It has narrow, elongated forewings of black with four yellow spots. The species is close to Maculonaclia leopardina and the holotype was provided from the region north of Maroantsetra.
