= Maculonaclia tampoketsya =

Scientific classification
- Domain: Eukaryota
- Kingdom: Animalia
- Phylum: Arthropoda
- Class: Insecta
- Order: Lepidoptera
- Superfamily: Noctuoidea
- Family: Erebidae
- Subfamily: Arctiinae
- Genus: Maculonaclia
- Species: M. tampoketsya

Binomial name
- Maculonaclia tampoketsya Griveaud, 1969

Species of moth

Maculonaclia tampoketsya is a moth of the subfamily Arctiinae. It is found in the central Madagascar.

This species has a wingspan of 22mm. It has narrow, allongated forewings of darf brown colour with 5 straw-yellow spots. The genitalia of this species are close to Maculonaclia ankasoka. The holotype provides from the region of Ankazobe.
