= Dubianaclia =

Scientific classification
- Domain: Eukaryota
- Kingdom: Animalia
- Phylum: Arthropoda
- Class: Insecta
- Order: Lepidoptera
- Superfamily: Noctuoidea
- Family: Erebidae
- Subfamily: Arctiinae
- Tribe: Syntomini
- Genus: Dubianaclia; Griveaud, 1964

Genus of moths

Dubianaclia is a genus of moths in the subfamily Arctiinae.

== Species ==
- Dubianaclia amplificata Saalm., 1879-80
- Dubianaclia butleri Mabille, 1884
- Dubianaclia robinsoni Griveaud, 1964
- Dubianaclia quinquimacula Mabille, 1882

== Former species ==
- Dubianaclia contigua Saalmüller, 1884
