= Micronaclia simplex =

Scientific classification
- Kingdom: Animalia
- Phylum: Arthropoda
- Class: Insecta
- Order: Lepidoptera
- Superfamily: Noctuoidea
- Family: Erebidae
- Subfamily: Arctiinae
- Genus: Micronaclia
- Species: M. simplex

Binomial name
- Micronaclia simplex (Butler, 1879)

Synonyms
- Pseudonaclia simplex Butler, 1879

Species of moth

Micronaclia simplex is a moth of the subfamily Arctiinae. It was described by Arthur Gardiner Butler in 1879. It is found in Madagascar.
