= Thyrosticta octopunctata =

Scientific classification
- Domain: Eukaryota
- Kingdom: Animalia
- Phylum: Arthropoda
- Class: Insecta
- Order: Lepidoptera
- Superfamily: Noctuoidea
- Family: Erebidae
- Subfamily: Arctiinae
- Genus: Thyrosticta
- Species: T. octopunctata

Binomial name
- Thyrosticta octopunctata Rothschild, 1924

Species of moth

Thyrosticta octopunctata is a moth in the subfamily Arctiinae. It was described by Rothschild in 1924. It is found in Madagascar.
