= Thyrosticta dujardini =

Scientific classification
- Domain: Eukaryota
- Kingdom: Animalia
- Phylum: Arthropoda
- Class: Insecta
- Order: Lepidoptera
- Superfamily: Noctuoidea
- Family: Erebidae
- Subfamily: Arctiinae
- Genus: Thyrosticta
- Species: T. dujardini

Binomial name
- Thyrosticta dujardini Griveaud, 1969

Species of moth

Thyrosticta dujardini is a moth of the subfamily Arctiinae first described by Paul Griveaud in 1969. It is native to Madagascar.

This species has a wingspan of 32 mm. The forewings are dark brown, almost black, with four straw-yellow spots. Hindwings are orange yellow with a brown-black edge.
