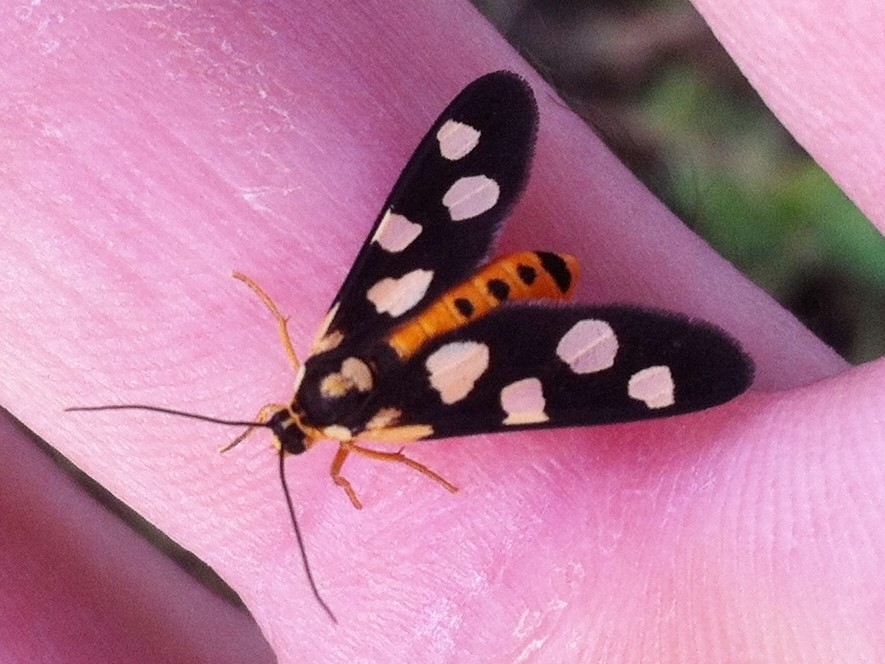

Scientific classification
- Domain: Eukaryota
- Kingdom: Animalia
- Phylum: Arthropoda
- Class: Insecta
- Order: Lepidoptera
- Superfamily: Noctuoidea
- Family: Erebidae
- Subfamily: Arctiinae
- Genus: Thyrosticta
- Species: T. minuta

Binomial name
- Thyrosticta minuta (Boisduval, 1833)

Synonyms
- Syntomis minuta Boisduval, 1833

= Thyrosticta minuta =

Species of moth

Thyrosticta minuta is a species of moth in the subfamily Arctiinae. It was described by Jean Baptiste Boisduval in 1833. It is found in Madagascar.
