= Thyrosticta triangulifera =

Scientific classification
- Domain: Eukaryota
- Kingdom: Animalia
- Phylum: Arthropoda
- Class: Insecta
- Order: Lepidoptera
- Superfamily: Noctuoidea
- Family: Erebidae
- Subfamily: Arctiinae
- Genus: Thyrosticta
- Species: T. triangulifera

Binomial name
- Thyrosticta triangulifera Griveaud, 1964

Species of moth

Thyrosticta triangulifera is a moth in the subfamily Arctiinae. It was described by Paul Griveaud in 1964. It is found on Madagascar.
