= Micronaclia rubrivittata =

Scientific classification
- Kingdom: Animalia
- Phylum: Arthropoda
- Class: Insecta
- Order: Lepidoptera
- Superfamily: Noctuoidea
- Family: Erebidae
- Subfamily: Arctiinae
- Genus: Micronaclia
- Species: M. rubrivittata

Binomial name
- Micronaclia rubrivittata Gaede, 1926

Species of moth

Micronaclia rubrivittata is a moth of the subfamily Arctiinae. It was described by Max Gaede in 1926. It is found in Cameroon.
