= Thyrosticta bimacula =

Scientific classification
- Kingdom: Animalia
- Phylum: Arthropoda
- Class: Insecta
- Order: Lepidoptera
- Superfamily: Noctuoidea
- Family: Erebidae
- Subfamily: Arctiinae
- Genus: Thyrosticta
- Species: T. bimacula

Binomial name
- Thyrosticta bimacula Griveaud, 1964

Species of moth

Thyrosticta bimacula is a moth belonging to the subfamily Arctiinae. It was described by Paul Griveaud in 1964. It is found on Madagascar.
