= Dubianaclia amplificata =

Scientific classification
- Kingdom: Animalia
- Phylum: Arthropoda
- Clade: Pancrustacea
- Class: Insecta
- Order: Lepidoptera
- Superfamily: Noctuoidea
- Family: Erebidae
- Subfamily: Arctiinae
- Genus: Dubianaclia
- Species: D. amplificata

Binomial name
- Dubianaclia amplificata (Saalmüller, 1880)

Synonyms
- Naclia amplificata Saalmüller, 1880; Stictonaclia amplificata; Dubianaclia ampificata

Species of moth

Dubianaclia amplificata is a moth of the subfamily Arctiinae. It was described by Saalmüller in 1880. It is found in Madagascar.
