= Thyrosticta bruneata =

Scientific classification
- Kingdom: Animalia
- Phylum: Arthropoda
- Clade: Pancrustacea
- Class: Insecta
- Order: Lepidoptera
- Superfamily: Noctuoidea
- Family: Erebidae
- Subfamily: Arctiinae
- Genus: Thyrosticta
- Species: T. bruneata

Binomial name
- Thyrosticta bruneata Griveaud, 1969

Species of moth

Thyrosticta bruneata is a moth of the subfamily Arctiinae first described by Paul Griveaud in 1969. It is native to Madagascar.

The male of this species has a wingspan of 18 mm, while the female has a wingspan of 22 mm. The forewings are dark brown, with one ochreous-yellow post basal spot, another whitish spot and two small whitish antemarginal spots. The hindwings are uniformly ochreous yellow and lack an external border.
