= Micronaclia imaitsia =

Scientific classification
- Kingdom: Animalia
- Phylum: Arthropoda
- Class: Insecta
- Order: Lepidoptera
- Superfamily: Noctuoidea
- Family: Erebidae
- Subfamily: Arctiinae
- Genus: Micronaclia
- Species: M. imaitsia

Binomial name
- Micronaclia imaitsia Griveaud, 1964

Species of moth

Micronaclia imaitsia is a moth of the subfamily Arctiinae. It was described by Paul Griveaud in 1964. It is found on Madagascar.
