= Thyrosticta tollini =

Scientific classification
- Kingdom: Animalia
- Phylum: Arthropoda
- Clade: Pancrustacea
- Class: Insecta
- Order: Lepidoptera
- Superfamily: Noctuoidea
- Family: Erebidae
- Subfamily: Arctiinae
- Genus: Thyrosticta
- Species: T. tollini

Binomial name
- Thyrosticta tollini (Keferstein, 1870)

Synonyms
- Glaucopis tollini Keferstein, 1870; Thyrosticta tollinii (Keferstein, 1870)

Species of moth

Thyrosticta tollini is a moth of the subfamily Arctiinae first described by Georg Adolf Keferstein in 1870. It is native to Madagascar.

This species has a wingspan of 32 mm.
