= Thyrosticta peyrierasi =

Scientific classification
- Domain: Eukaryota
- Kingdom: Animalia
- Phylum: Arthropoda
- Class: Insecta
- Order: Lepidoptera
- Superfamily: Noctuoidea
- Family: Erebidae
- Subfamily: Arctiinae
- Genus: Thyrosticta
- Species: T. peyrierasi

Binomial name
- Thyrosticta peyrierasi Griveaud, 1969

Species of moth

Thyrosticta peyrierasi is a moth in the subfamily Arctiinae. It was described by Paul Griveaud in 1969. It is found on Madagascar.
