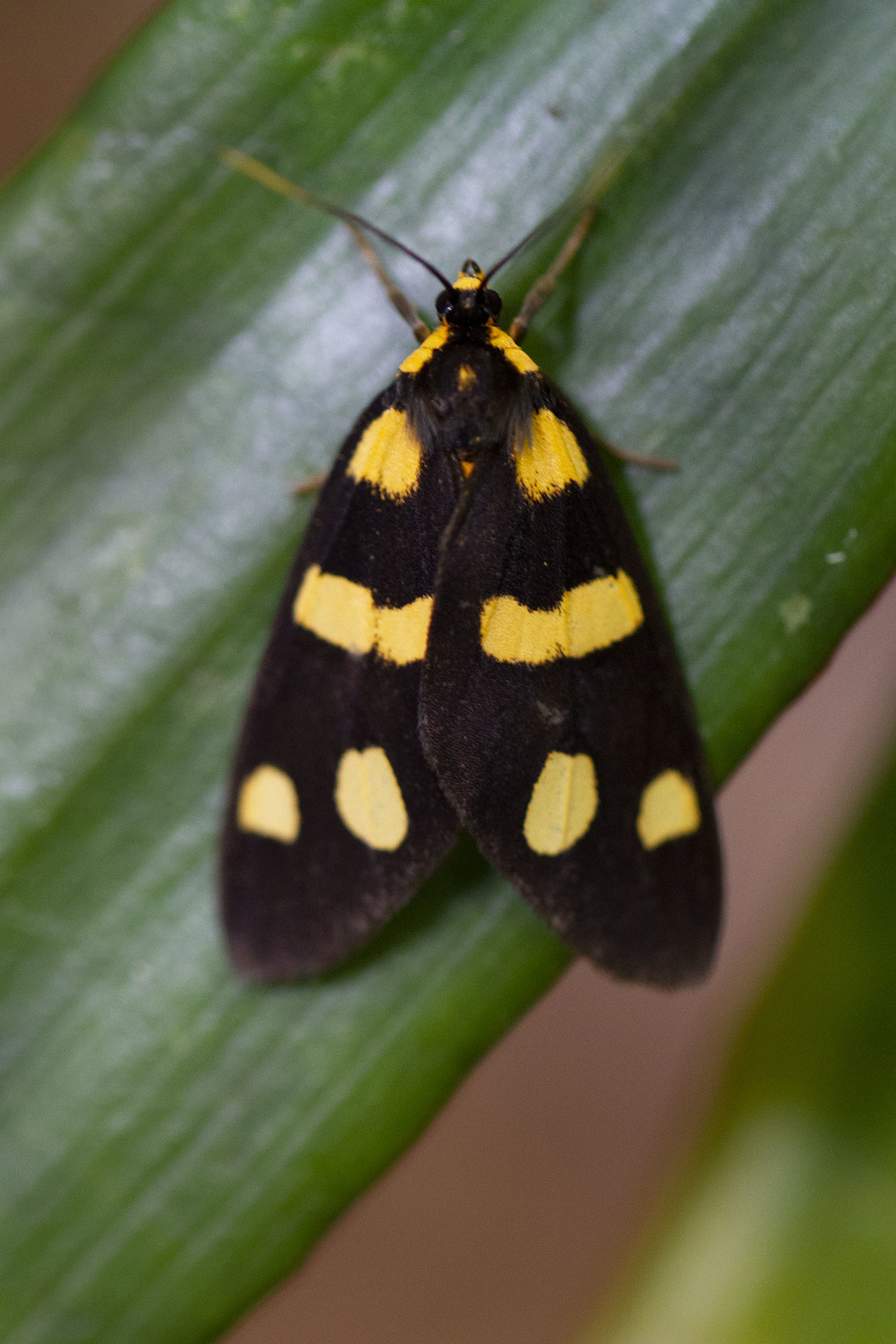

Scientific classification
- Kingdom: Animalia
- Phylum: Arthropoda
- Clade: Pancrustacea
- Class: Insecta
- Order: Lepidoptera
- Superfamily: Noctuoidea
- Family: Erebidae
- Subfamily: Arctiinae
- Genus: Thyrosticta
- Species: T. contigua

Binomial name
- Thyrosticta contigua (Saalmüller, 1884)

Synonyms
- Dysauxes contigua (Saalmüller, 1884); Dubianaclia contigua

= Thyrosticta contigua =

Species of moth

Thyrosticta contigua is a species of moth in the subfamily Arctiinae. It is native to Madagascar.

Its frontwings are black-brownish with 5 yellow spots, the wingspan is 26 mm.
