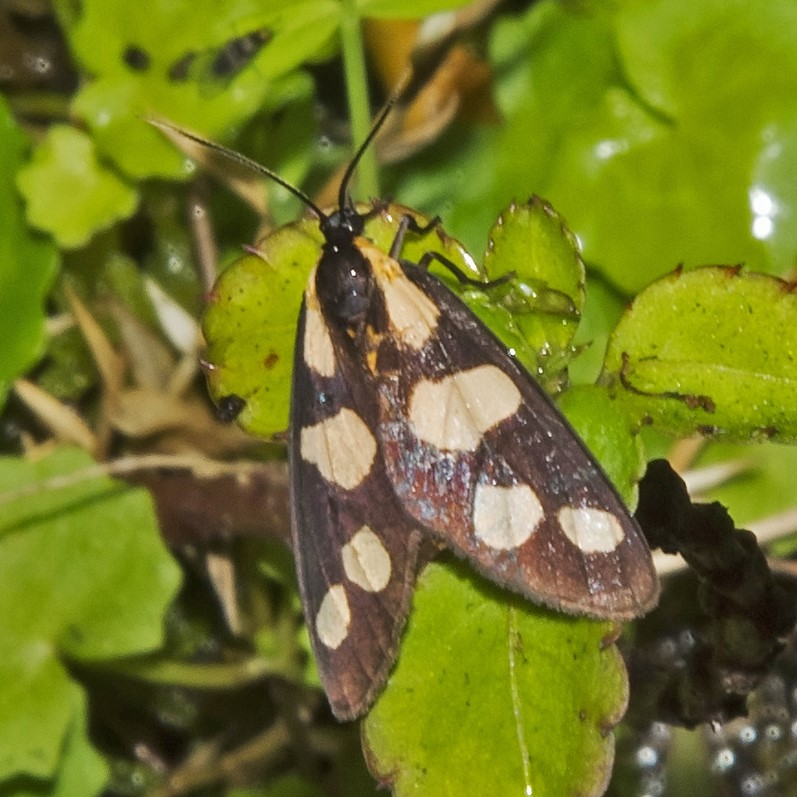

Scientific classification
- Kingdom: Animalia
- Phylum: Arthropoda
- Class: Insecta
- Order: Lepidoptera
- Superfamily: Noctuoidea
- Family: Erebidae
- Subfamily: Arctiinae
- Genus: Thyrosticta
- Species: T. sylvicolens

Binomial name
- Thyrosticta sylvicolens (Butler, 1878)

Synonyms
- List: Pseudonaclia sylvicolens (Butler, 1878); Thyrosticta confluens Oberthür, 1893; Thyrosticta holoxantha Zerny, 1912; Thyrosticta quadrimacula Hampson, 1898; Naclia perpetua Oberthür, 1893; Naclia quadrimacula (Mabille, 1879)

= Thyrosticta sylvicolens =

Species of moth

Thyrosticta sylvicolens is a species of moth in the subfamily Arctiinae. It was first described by Arthur Gardiner Butler in 1878 and is native to Madagascar.

Thyrosticta sylvicolens has a wingspan of 40–42 mm.
