= Maculonaclia bicolorata =

Scientific classification
- Domain: Eukaryota
- Kingdom: Animalia
- Phylum: Arthropoda
- Class: Insecta
- Order: Lepidoptera
- Superfamily: Noctuoidea
- Family: Erebidae
- Subfamily: Arctiinae
- Genus: Maculonaclia
- Species: M. bicolorata

Binomial name
- Maculonaclia bicolorata Griveaud, 1967

Species of moth

Maculonaclia bicolorata is a moth of the subfamily Arctiinae. It was described by Paul Griveaud in 1967. It is found on Madagascar.
