= Dubianaclia quinquemacula =

Scientific classification
- Kingdom: Animalia
- Phylum: Arthropoda
- Clade: Pancrustacea
- Class: Insecta
- Order: Lepidoptera
- Superfamily: Noctuoidea
- Family: Erebidae
- Subfamily: Arctiinae
- Genus: Dubianaclia
- Species: D. quinquemacula

Binomial name
- Dubianaclia quinquemacula (Mabille, 1882)

Synonyms
- Syntomis quinquemacula Mabille, 1882; Naclia cambouei Oberthür, 1893; Naclia perroteti Oberthür, 1893; Dubianaclia quinquimacula

Species of moth

Dubianaclia quinquemacula is a moth of the subfamily Arctiinae. It was described by Paul Mabille in 1882. It is found in Madagascar.

== Subspecies ==
- Dubianaclia quinquemacula quinquemacula
- Dubianaclia quinquemacula confusa Griveaud, 1969
