= Maculonaclia parvifenestrata =

Scientific classification
- Kingdom: Animalia
- Phylum: Arthropoda
- Clade: Pancrustacea
- Class: Insecta
- Order: Lepidoptera
- Superfamily: Noctuoidea
- Family: Erebidae
- Subfamily: Arctiinae
- Genus: Maculonaclia
- Species: M. parvifenestrata

Binomial name
- Maculonaclia parvifenestrata Griveaud, 1964

Species of moth

Maculonaclia parvifenestrata is a moth of the subfamily Arctiinae. It was described by Paul Griveaud in 1964. It is found on Madagascar.
