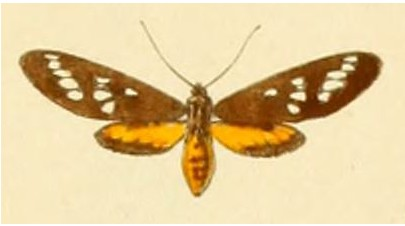

Scientific classification
- Domain: Eukaryota
- Kingdom: Animalia
- Phylum: Arthropoda
- Class: Insecta
- Order: Lepidoptera
- Superfamily: Noctuoidea
- Family: Erebidae
- Subfamily: Arctiinae
- Genus: Maculonaclia
- Species: M. florida

Binomial name
- Maculonaclia florida (de Joannis, 1906)

Synonyms
- Dysauxes florida de Joannis, 1906

= Maculonaclia florida =

Species of moth

Maculonaclia florida is a moth of the subfamily Arctiinae. It was described by Joseph de Joannis in 1906. It is found on Mauritius.
