= Thyrosticta trimacula =

Scientific classification
- Domain: Eukaryota
- Kingdom: Animalia
- Phylum: Arthropoda
- Class: Insecta
- Order: Lepidoptera
- Superfamily: Noctuoidea
- Family: Erebidae
- Subfamily: Arctiinae
- Genus: Thyrosticta
- Species: T. trimacula

Binomial name
- Thyrosticta trimacula (Mabille, 1875)

Synonyms
- Naclia trimacula Mabille, 1875

Species of moth

Thyrosticta trimacula is a moth in the subfamily Arctiinae. It was described by Paul Mabille in 1875. It is found on Madagascar.
