= Maculonaclia griveaudi =

Scientific classification
- Kingdom: Animalia
- Phylum: Arthropoda
- Class: Insecta
- Order: Lepidoptera
- Superfamily: Noctuoidea
- Family: Erebidae
- Subfamily: Arctiinae
- Genus: Maculonaclia
- Species: M. griveaudi

Binomial name
- Maculonaclia griveaudi Viette, 1987

Species of moth

Maculonaclia griveaudi is a moth of the subfamily Arctiinae. It was described by Viette in 1987. It is found in Madagascar.
