= Thyrosticta =

Scientific classification
- Kingdom: Animalia
- Phylum: Arthropoda
- Class: Insecta
- Order: Lepidoptera
- Superfamily: Noctuoidea
- Family: Erebidae
- Subfamily: Arctiinae
- Tribe: Syntomini
- Genus: Thyrosticta; Hampson, 1898

Genus of moths

Thyrosticta is a genus of moths in the subfamily Arctiinae. The genus was erected by George Hampson in 1898.

== Species ==
- Thyrosticta agatha (Oberthür, 1893)
- Thyrosticta angustipennis Le Cerf, 1924
- Thyrosticta ankaratta Griveaud
- Thyrosticta bimacula Griveaud, 1964
- Thyrosticta bruneata Griveaud, 1969
- Thyrosticta cowani Griveaud, 1964
- Thyrosticta dilata Griveaud, 1964
- Thyrosticta dujardini Griveaud, 1969
- Thyrosticta incerta Griveaud, 1964
- Thyrosticta lacrimata Griveaud, 1964
- Thyrosticta melanisa Griveaud, 1969
- Thyrosticta minuta Boisduval, 1833
- Thyrosticta octopunctata Rothschild, 1924
- Thyrosticta pauliani Griveaud, 1964
- Thyrosticta peyrierasi Griveaud, 1969
- Thyrosticta raharizonina Griveaud, 1964
- Thyrosticta ratovosoni Griveaud, 1964
- Thyrosticta rothschildi Griveaud, 1964
- Thyrosticta seguyi Griveaud, 1964
- Thyrosticta sylvicolens (Butler, 1878)
- Thyrosticta tollini (Keferstein, 1870)
- Thyrosticta triangulifera Griveaud, 1964
- Thyrosticta trimacula Mabille, 1875
- Thyrosticta vestigii Griveaud, 1964
- Thyrosticta vieui Griveaud, 1964
