= Maculonaclia leopardina =

Scientific classification
- Domain: Eukaryota
- Kingdom: Animalia
- Phylum: Arthropoda
- Class: Insecta
- Order: Lepidoptera
- Superfamily: Noctuoidea
- Family: Erebidae
- Subfamily: Arctiinae
- Genus: Maculonaclia
- Species: M. leopardina

Binomial name
- Maculonaclia leopardina (Rothschild, 1911)

Synonyms
- Micronaclia leopardina Rothschild, 1911

Species of moth

Maculonaclia leopardina is a moth of the subfamily Arctiinae. It was described by Rothschild in 1911. It is found in Madagascar.
