= Dubianaclia butleri =

Scientific classification
- Domain: Eukaryota
- Kingdom: Animalia
- Phylum: Arthropoda
- Class: Insecta
- Order: Lepidoptera
- Superfamily: Noctuoidea
- Family: Erebidae
- Subfamily: Arctiinae
- Genus: Dubianaclia
- Species: D. butleri

Binomial name
- Dubianaclia butleri (Mabille, 1884)

Synonyms
- Syntomis butleri Mabille 1882; Dysauxes distincta Saalmüller, 1884; Naclia eleonora Oberthür, 1923; Dysauxes expallescens Saalmüller, 1884; Dysauxes extensa Saalmüller, 1884; Naclia severina Oberthür, 1923

Species of moth

Dubianaclia butleri is a moth of the subfamily Arctiinae. It was described by Paul Mabille in 1884. It is found on Madagascar.
