= Maculonaclia tenera =

Scientific classification
- Domain: Eukaryota
- Kingdom: Animalia
- Phylum: Arthropoda
- Class: Insecta
- Order: Lepidoptera
- Superfamily: Noctuoidea
- Family: Erebidae
- Subfamily: Arctiinae
- Genus: Maculonaclia
- Species: M. tenera

Binomial name
- Maculonaclia tenera (Mabille, 1879)

Synonyms
- Naclia tenera Mabille, 1879

Species of moth

Maculonaclia tenera is a moth of the subfamily Arctiinae. It was described by Paul Mabille in 1879. It is found on Madagascar.
