= Maculonaclia muscella =

Scientific classification
- Domain: Eukaryota
- Kingdom: Animalia
- Phylum: Arthropoda
- Class: Insecta
- Order: Lepidoptera
- Superfamily: Noctuoidea
- Family: Erebidae
- Subfamily: Arctiinae
- Genus: Maculonaclia
- Species: M. muscella

Binomial name
- Maculonaclia muscella (Mabille, 1884)

Synonyms
- Syntomis muscella Mabille, 1884; Naclia flavia Oberthür, 1893; Dysauxes lucia Oberthür, 1893; Naclia marietta Oberthür, 1909; Dysauxes subfenestrata Aurivillius, 1900; Micronaclia muscella ab. muscellula Strand, 1916

Species of moth

Maculonaclia muscella is a moth of the subfamily Arctiinae. It was described by Paul Mabille in 1884. It is found on Madagascar.
