= Maculonaclia ankasoka =

Scientific classification
- Domain: Eukaryota
- Kingdom: Animalia
- Phylum: Arthropoda
- Class: Insecta
- Order: Lepidoptera
- Superfamily: Noctuoidea
- Family: Erebidae
- Subfamily: Arctiinae
- Genus: Maculonaclia
- Species: M. ankasoka

Binomial name
- Maculonaclia ankasoka Griveaud, 1964

Species of moth

Maculonaclia ankasoka is a moth of the subfamily Arctiinae. It was described by Paul Griveaud in 1964. It is found on Madagascar.
