= Thyrosticta agatha =

Scientific classification
- Domain: Eukaryota
- Kingdom: Animalia
- Phylum: Arthropoda
- Class: Insecta
- Order: Lepidoptera
- Superfamily: Noctuoidea
- Family: Erebidae
- Subfamily: Arctiinae
- Genus: Thyrosticta
- Species: T. agatha

Binomial name
- Thyrosticta agatha (Oberthür, 1893)

Synonyms
- Naclia agatha (Oberthür, 1893); Maculonaclia agatha (Oberthür, 1893)

Species of moth

Thyrosticta agatha is a moth of the subfamily Arctiinae first described by Oberthür in 1893. It is native to Madagascar.

It has a wingspan of 28 mm.
