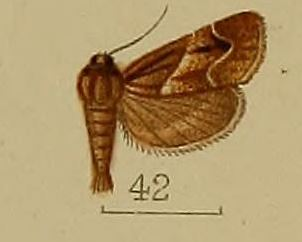
- Bostra mesoleucalis

Scientific classification
- Domain: Eukaryota
- Kingdom: Animalia
- Phylum: Arthropoda
- Class: Insecta
- Order: Lepidoptera
- Family: Pyralidae
- Tribe: Pyralini
- Genus: Bostra; Walker, 1863

Type species
- Bostra illusella Walker, 1863

Synonyms
- Therapne Ragonot, 1890

= Bostra (moth) =

Genus of moths

Bostra is a genus of snout moths. It was described by Francis Walker in 1863 and is known from Europe, Africa, and Asia.

== Species ==
These 114 species belong to the genus Bostra:

- Bostra albilineata Warren, 1891 (Africa)
- Bostra albistictalis de Joannis, 1930
- Bostra ambinanitalis Viette, 1960
- Bostra amphidissa Meyrick, 1933
- Bostra angulifascia Moore, 1888
- Bostra anhydropa Meyrick, 1933
- Bostra arida Butler, 1881
- Bostra asbenicola Rothschild, 1921 (Africa)
- Bostra astigma Hampson, 1893
- Bostra atomalis Amsel, 1949
- Bostra austautalis (Oberthür, 1881)
- Bostra balux Swinhoe, 1884
- Bostra bifascialis Amsel, 1950
- Bostra bradleyalis Viette, 1960
- Bostra buddhalis Caradja, 1927
- Bostra callispilalis Le Cerf, 1922 (Kenya)
- Bostra carnealis Hampson, 1896
- Bostra carnicolor Warren, 1914 (South Africa)
- Bostra castanoptera Moore, 1885
- Bostra catochrysalis Ragonot, 1891
- Bostra cervinalis Rebel, 1902
- Bostra chlorostoma Meyrick, 1934 (Congo)
- Bostra claveriei Rougeot, 1977
- Bostra coenochroa Hampson, 1917 (Africa)
- Bostra comealis Amsel, 1951
- Bostra conflualis Hampson, 1906 (South Africa)
- Bostra conspicualis Warren, 1911 (South Africa)
- Bostra denticulata Swinhoe, 1890
- Bostra dentilinealis Hampson, 1917 (Malawi)
- Bostra diffusalis Walker, 1863
- Bostra dipectinialis Hampson, 1906 (Africa)
- Bostra evillensis Ghesquière, 1942
- Bostra excelsa Rougeot, 1984 (Ethiopia)
- Bostra farsalis Amsel, 1950
- Bostra fascialis Warren, 1895
- Bostra ferrealis Hampson, 1906 (South Africa)
- Bostra ferrifusalis Hampson, 1899
- Bostra flammalis Hampson, 1906
- Bostra flavilinealis Hampson, 1906
- Bostra flavicostalis Warren, 1914 (South Africa)
- Bostra fracticornalis Snellen, 1895
- Bostra fumosa de Joannis, 1927 (Mozambique)
- Bostra fuscella Amsel, 1959
- Bostra fuscipennis Hampson, 1910 (Zambia)
- Bostra fuscolimbalis Ragonot, 1888
- Bostra glaucalis Hampson, 1906 (Tanzania)
- Bostra gnidusalis Walker, 1859
- Bostra homsalis Amsel, 1952
- Bostra igneusta Swinhoe, 1895
- Bostra ignirubralis Hampson, 1917
- Bostra illusella Walker, 1863
- Bostra imperatrix Warren, 1896
- Bostra indicator Walker, 1863
- Bostra kirmanialis Amsel, 1961
- Bostra kneuckeri Rebel, 1909
- Bostra laristanalis Amsel, 1961
- Bostra lateritialis Guenée, 1854 (Africa)
- Bostra legalis Meyrick, 1933 (Congo)
- Bostra leucostigmalis Hampson, 1906 (Tanzania)
- Bostra lignealis Hampson, 1917 (Kenya)
- Bostra linogramma Meyrick, 1933 (Congo)
- Bostra loxotona Meyrick, 1933
- Bostra luteocostalis Amsel, 1950
- Bostra maculilinea Hampson, 1917 (Malawi)
- Bostra marginalis Rothschild, 1921
- Bostra mesoleucalis Hampson, 1912
- Bostra metaxanthialis Hampson, 1906
- Bostra minimalis Amsel, 1949
- Bostra mirifica Inoue, 1985
- Bostra nanalis Wileman, 1911 (temperate Asia)
- Bostra nephelorthra Meyrick, 1933
- Bostra noctuina Butler, 1875 (South Africa)
- Bostra obsoletalis (Mann, 1884) (temperate Asia)
- Bostra ochrigrammalis Hampson, 1906 (Nigeria)
- Bostra ochrigraphalis Hampson, 1906 (Africa)
- Bostra orthocopa Meyrick, 1937
- Bostra pallidicolor Hampson, 1917 (South Africa)
- Bostra pallidicosta Hampson, 1893
- Bostra pallidifrons Hampson, 1917 (Africa)
- Bostra perrubida Hampson, 1910 (Zambia)
- Bostra phoenicocraspis Hampson, 1917 (Cameroon)
- Bostra phoenicoxantha Hampson, 1917 (Cameroon)
- Bostra pseudoexcelsa Rougeot, 1984 (Ethiopia)
- Bostra pseudospaniella Amsel, 1951
- Bostra puncticostalis Hampson, 1898 (South Africa)
- Bostra purpurealis Hampson, 1917 (Africa)
- Bostra pygmaea Hampson, 1906 (Kenya)
- Bostra pyrochroa Hampson, 1916
- Bostra pyrochroalis Hampson, 1916 (Somalia)
- Bostra pyroxantha Hampson, 1906 (Zimbabwe)
- Bostra ragonotalis Viette, 1960
- Bostra rhodophaea Ghesquière, 1942
- Bostra rigidalis Snellen, 1900
- Bostra rufimarginalis Hampson, 1906 (Africa)
- Bostra ruptilinealis Warren, 1895
- Bostra rusinalis Hampson, 1917 (Africa)
- Bostra salmo Hampson, 1891
- Bostra sarcosia Hampson, 1912
- Bostra scotalis Hampson, 1906 (Africa)
- Bostra semnodoxa Meyrick, 1934
- Bostra sentalis Hampson, 1906 (Africa)
- Bostra shirazalis Amsel, 1961
- Bostra sogalis Viette, 1960
- Bostra spaniella Amsel, 1935
- Bostra subviridescens Warren, 1895
- Bostra suffusalis Hampson, 1906 (Africa)
- Bostra tenebralis Hampson, 1906 (Africa)
- Bostra thermialis Hampson, 1910 (Africa)
- Bostra tripartita Warren, 1897 (Africa)
- Bostra tristis (Butler, 1881) (Africa)
- Bostra tyriocausta Meyrick, 1933
- Bostra vetustalis Zeller, 1852 (Africa)
- Bostra whalleyalis Viette, 1960
- Bostra xanthorhodalis Hampson, 1906 (Africa)
