= Loryma actenioides =

Scientific classification
- Domain: Eukaryota
- Kingdom: Animalia
- Phylum: Arthropoda
- Class: Insecta
- Order: Lepidoptera
- Family: Pyralidae
- Genus: Loryma
- Species: L. actenioides

Binomial name
- Loryma actenioides (Rebel, 1914)

Synonyms
- Actenia actenioides Rebel, 1914; Actenia geyri Rothschild, 1915; Aglossa harterti Rothschild, 1915

Species of moth

Loryma actenioides is a species of snout moth in the genus Loryma. It was described by Rebel in 1914, and is known from Algeria, the Sahara desert, and Egypt.
