= Loryma creperalis =

Scientific classification
- Domain: Eukaryota
- Kingdom: Animalia
- Phylum: Arthropoda
- Class: Insecta
- Order: Lepidoptera
- Family: Pyralidae
- Genus: Loryma
- Species: L. creperalis

Binomial name
- Loryma creperalis (C. Swinhoe, 1886)

Synonyms
- Nephopteryx creperalis C. Swinhoe, 1886

Species of moth

Loryma creperalis is a species of snout moth in the genus Loryma. It was described by Charles Swinhoe in 1886 and is known from India (including Pune, the type location).
