= Loryma sinuosalis =

Scientific classification
- Kingdom: Animalia
- Phylum: Arthropoda
- Class: Insecta
- Order: Lepidoptera
- Family: Pyralidae
- Genus: Loryma
- Species: L. sinuosalis

Binomial name
- Loryma sinuosalis P. Leraut, 2007

Species of moth

Loryma sinuosalis is a species of snout moth in the genus Loryma. It was described by Patrice J.A. Leraut in 2007 and is known from South Africa (the type location is Johannesburg).
