= Loryma discimaculla =

Scientific classification
- Kingdom: Animalia
- Phylum: Arthropoda
- Class: Insecta
- Order: Lepidoptera
- Family: Pyralidae
- Genus: Loryma
- Species: L. discimaculla

Binomial name
- Loryma discimaculla (Hampson, 1917)

Synonyms
- Anobostra discimaculla Hampson, 1917

Species of moth

Loryma discimaculla is a species of snout moth in the genus Loryma. It was described by George Hampson in 1917 and is known from Malawi (including Mount Mulanje, the type location).
