= Loryma bilinealis =

Scientific classification
- Domain: Eukaryota
- Kingdom: Animalia
- Phylum: Arthropoda
- Class: Insecta
- Order: Lepidoptera
- Family: Pyralidae
- Genus: Loryma
- Species: L. bilinealis

Binomial name
- Loryma bilinealis (Amsel, 1961)

Synonyms
- Iraniodes bilinealis Amsel, 1961

Species of moth

Loryma bilinealis is a species of snout moth in the genus Loryma. It was described by Hans Georg Amsel in 1961 and is known from Iran.
