= Loryma daganialis =

Scientific classification
- Domain: Eukaryota
- Kingdom: Animalia
- Phylum: Arthropoda
- Class: Insecta
- Order: Lepidoptera
- Family: Pyralidae
- Genus: Loryma
- Species: L. daganialis

Binomial name
- Loryma daganialis (Amsel, 1956)

Synonyms
- Anactenia daganialis Amsel, 1956

Species of moth

Loryma daganialis is a species of moth in the family Pyralidae. It was described by Hans Georg Amsel in 1956 and is found in Jordan.
