= Loryma callos =

Scientific classification
- Kingdom: Animalia
- Phylum: Arthropoda
- Class: Insecta
- Order: Lepidoptera
- Family: Pyralidae
- Genus: Loryma
- Species: L. callos

Binomial name
- Loryma callos (Viette, 1973)

Synonyms
- Philotis callos Viette, 1973

Species of moth

Loryma callos is a species of snout moth in the genus Loryma. It was described by Pierre Viette in 1973 and is known from Zimbabwe. It has also been found in Madagascar.
