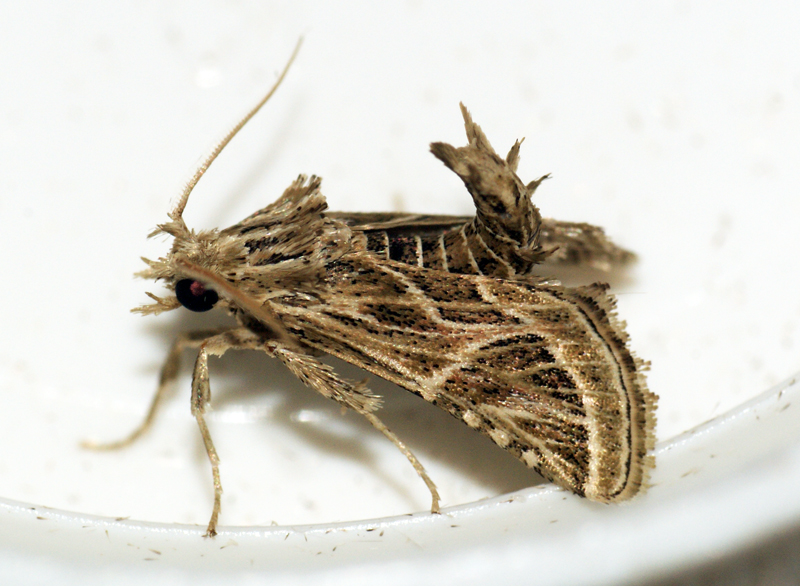

Scientific classification
- Kingdom: Animalia
- Phylum: Arthropoda
- Class: Insecta
- Order: Lepidoptera
- Family: Pyralidae
- Genus: Loryma
- Species: L. recusata

Binomial name
- Loryma recusata (Walker, 1863)

Synonyms
- Beria recusata Walker, 1863; Hypotia philornis Meyrick, 1937; Tauba venosella Walker, 1866

= Loryma recusata =

Species of moth

Loryma recusata is a species of snout moth in the genus Loryma. It was described by Francis Walker in 1863 and is known from Taiwan, Indonesia (including Sumatra, Borneo and Java), Sri Lanka, India, Thailand, western Malaysia and New Guinea. It has also been recorded from northern Australia and South Africa.
