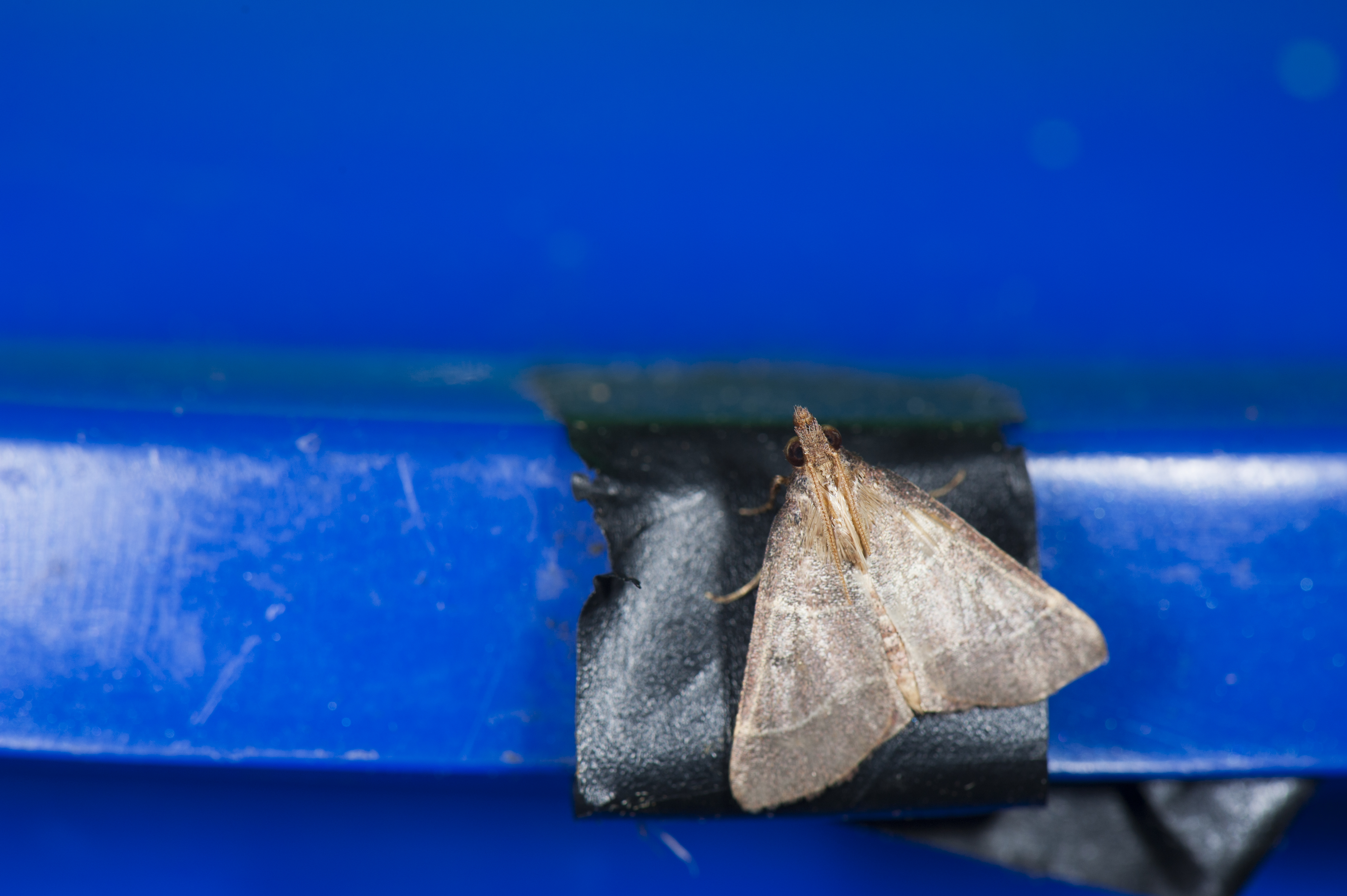

Scientific classification
- Kingdom: Animalia
- Phylum: Arthropoda
- Class: Insecta
- Order: Lepidoptera
- Family: Pyralidae
- Genus: Bostra
- Species: B. indicator

Binomial name
- Bostra indicator (Walker, 1864)

Synonyms
- Arippara indicator Walker, 1864; Paleca rufescens Butler, 1879; Arippara rufescens; Bostra rufescens

= Bostra indicator =

Species of moth

Bostra indicator is a species of snout moth in the genus Bostra. It was described by Francis Walker in 1864. It is found in China, Korea, Japan, Taiwan, Indonesia, Malaysia and India.

The wingspan is 24–31 mm. Adults are on wing in July.

The larvae feed on Cinnamomum camphora and Rhus species.
