= Loryma masamalis =

Scientific classification
- Domain: Eukaryota
- Kingdom: Animalia
- Phylum: Arthropoda
- Class: Insecta
- Order: Lepidoptera
- Family: Pyralidae
- Genus: Loryma
- Species: L. masamalis

Binomial name
- Loryma masamalis P. Leraut, 2009

Species of moth

Loryma masamalis is a species of snout moth in the genus Loryma. It was described by Patrice J.A. Leraut in 2009 and is known from Madagascar (the type location is Antsalova).
