= Bostra gnidusalis =

Scientific classification
- Kingdom: Animalia
- Phylum: Arthropoda
- Class: Insecta
- Order: Lepidoptera
- Family: Pyralidae
- Subfamily: Pyralinae
- Tribe: Pyralini
- Genus: Bostra
- Species: B. gnidusalis

Binomial name
- Bostra gnidusalis Walker, 1859

Species of moth

Bostra gnidusalis is a moth of the family Pyralidae.
