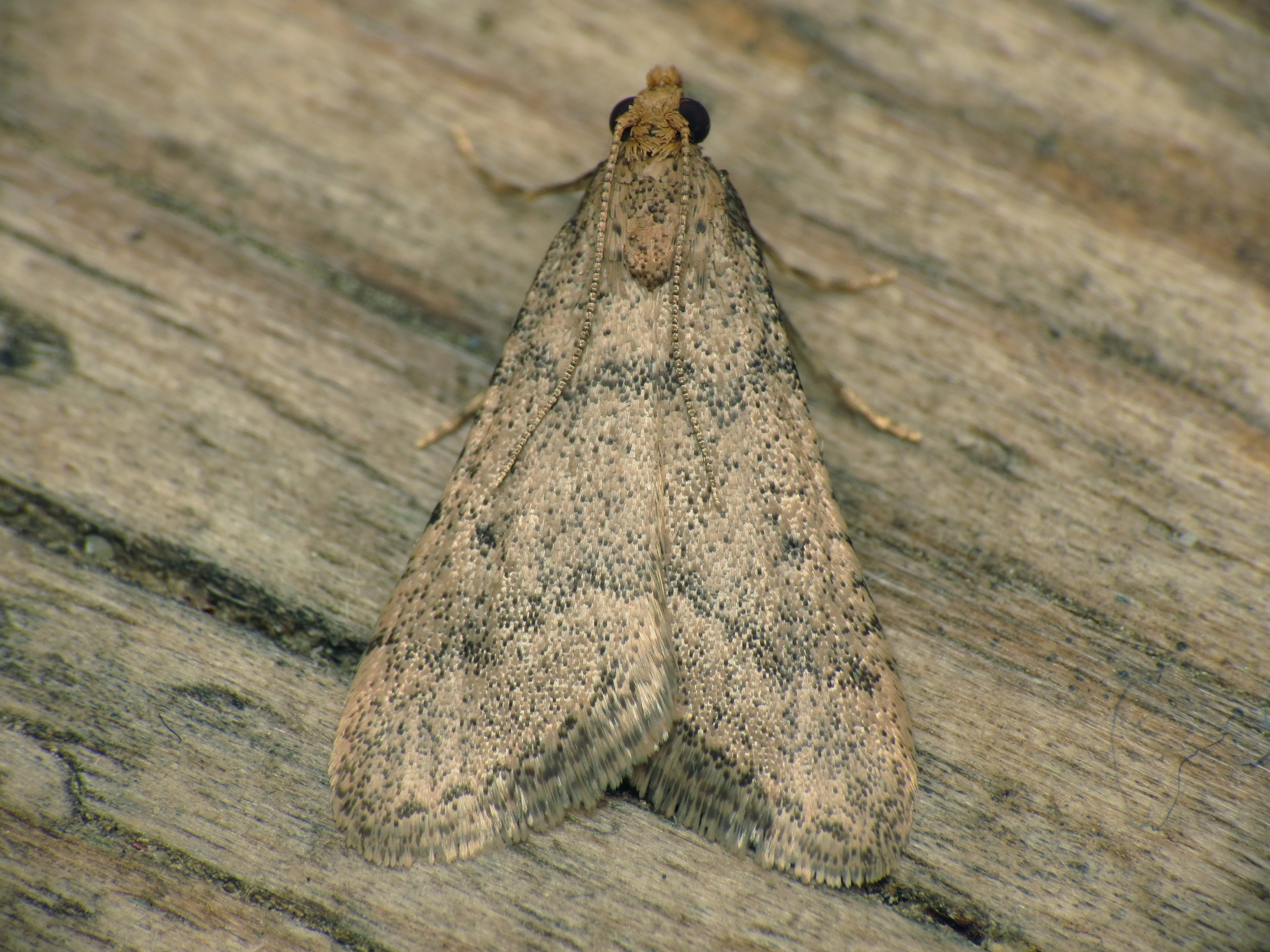

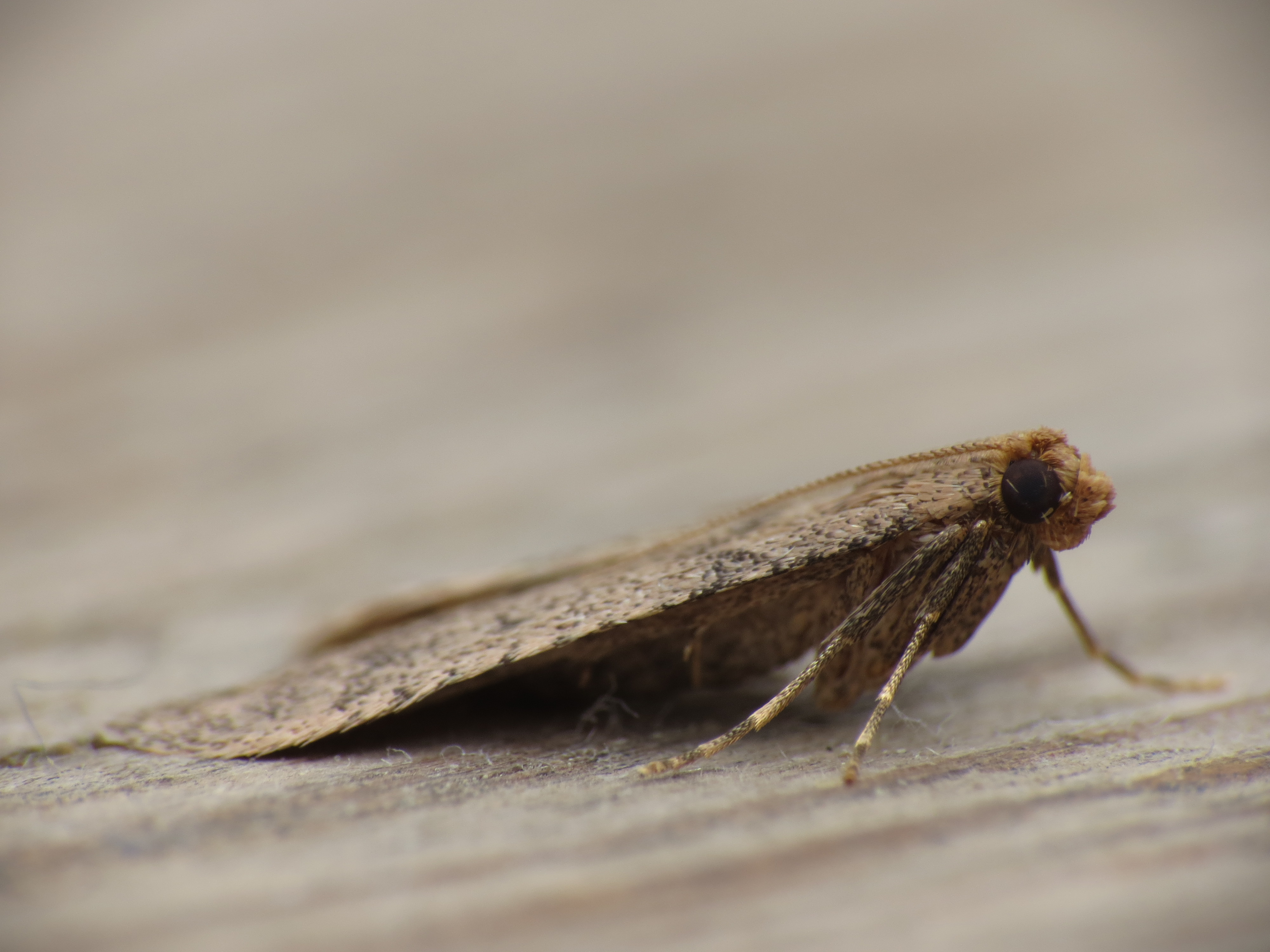

Scientific classification
- Domain: Eukaryota
- Kingdom: Animalia
- Phylum: Arthropoda
- Class: Insecta
- Order: Lepidoptera
- Family: Pyralidae
- Genus: Bostra
- Species: B. obsoletalis

Binomial name
- Bostra obsoletalis (Mann, 1864)

Synonyms
- Stemmatophora obsoletalis Mann, 1864; Cledeobia obsoletalis; Pyralis obsoletalis; Pyralis palaestinensis Amsel, 1935; Pyralis tunesialis Caradja, 1916; Pyrausta buckwelli D. Lucas, 1954

= Bostra obsoletalis =

Species of moth

Bostra obsoletalis is a species of moth in the family Pyralidae described by Josef Johann Mann in 1864. It is found in southern Europe, Yemen, Sudan, the Palestinian territories, Tunisia and Morocco.

The wingspan is 14–15 mm. Adults are on wing from June to August.
