= Loryma athalialis =

Scientific classification
- Kingdom: Animalia
- Phylum: Arthropoda
- Class: Insecta
- Order: Lepidoptera
- Family: Pyralidae
- Genus: Loryma
- Species: L. athalialis

Binomial name
- Loryma athalialis (Walker, 1859)

Synonyms
- Cynoeda athalialis Walker, 1859; Asopia cultralis Snellen, 1872; Ulotrichodes milloti Viette, 1949

Species of moth

Loryma athalialis is a species of snout moth in the genus Loryma. It was described by Francis Walker in 1859 and is known from the Democratic Republic of the Congo, South Africa (the type location is Cape Town) and Madagascar (including Tananarive).
