= Bostra nanalis =

Scientific classification
- Domain: Eukaryota
- Kingdom: Animalia
- Phylum: Arthropoda
- Class: Insecta
- Order: Lepidoptera
- Family: Pyralidae
- Genus: Bostra
- Species: B. nanalis

Binomial name
- Bostra nanalis (Wileman, 1911)

Synonyms
- Pyralis nanalis Wileman, 1911; Endotricha ruficosta Wileman & South, 1917

Species of moth

Bostra nanalis is a species of snout moth in the genus Bostra. It was described by Alfred Ernest Wileman in 1911, and is known from Japan and Taiwan.
