= Loryma aridalis =

Scientific classification
- Domain: Eukaryota
- Kingdom: Animalia
- Phylum: Arthropoda
- Class: Insecta
- Order: Lepidoptera
- Family: Pyralidae
- Genus: Loryma
- Species: L. aridalis

Binomial name
- Loryma aridalis (Rothschild, 1913)

Synonyms
- Constantis aridalis Rothschild, 1913; Actenia aridalis; Praekatja aridalis

Species of moth

Loryma aridalis is a species of snout moth in the genus Loryma. It was described by Rothschild in 1913. It is found in Algeria.
