= Loryma hypotialis =

Scientific classification
- Domain: Eukaryota
- Kingdom: Animalia
- Phylum: Arthropoda
- Class: Insecta
- Order: Lepidoptera
- Family: Pyralidae
- Genus: Loryma
- Species: L. hypotialis

Binomial name
- Loryma hypotialis (C. Swinhoe, 1886)

Synonyms
- Cledeobia hypotialis C. Swinhoe, 1886

Species of moth

Loryma hypotialis is a species of snout moth in the genus Loryma. It was described by Charles Swinhoe in 1886, and is known from India (including Pune, the type location).
