= Bostra illusella =

Scientific classification
- Kingdom: Animalia
- Phylum: Arthropoda
- Class: Insecta
- Order: Lepidoptera
- Family: Pyralidae
- Genus: Bostra
- Species: B. illusella

Binomial name
- Bostra illusella Walker, 1863

Species of moth

Bostra illusella is a species of snout moth in the genus Bostra. It was described by Francis Walker in 1863. It is found in Sri Lanka.
