= Bostra pyrochroalis =

Scientific classification
- Kingdom: Animalia
- Phylum: Arthropoda
- Class: Insecta
- Order: Lepidoptera
- Family: Pyralidae
- Genus: Bostra
- Species: B. pyrochroalis

Binomial name
- Bostra pyrochroalis Hampson, 1916

Species of snout moth

Bostra pyrochroalis is a species of snout moth in the genus Hypotia.

I it is known from Somalia and has a wingspan of 16mm.
