= Bostra fumosa =

Scientific classification
- Domain: Eukaryota
- Kingdom: Animalia
- Phylum: Arthropoda
- Class: Insecta
- Order: Lepidoptera
- Family: Pyralidae
- Genus: Bostra
- Species: B. fumosa

Binomial name
- Bostra fumosa de Joannis, 1927

Species of moth

Bostra fumosa is a species of snout moth in the genus Bostra. It was described by Joseph de Joannis in 1927 and is known from Mozambique.
