= Loryma martinae =

Scientific classification
- Domain: Eukaryota
- Kingdom: Animalia
- Phylum: Arthropoda
- Class: Insecta
- Order: Lepidoptera
- Family: Pyralidae
- Genus: Loryma
- Species: L. martinae

Binomial name
- Loryma martinae Leraut, 2002

Species of moth

Loryma martinae is a species of snout moth in the genus Loryma. It was described by Patrice J.A. Leraut in 2002 and is known from Morocco (type location Aït Melloul) and Algeria (type location Laghouat).

== Subspecies ==
- L. martinae martinae (Morocco)
- L. martinae dumonti (Algeria)
