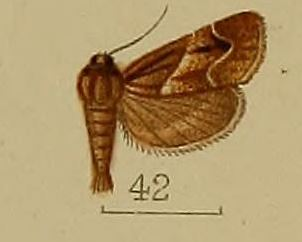

Scientific classification
- Kingdom: Animalia
- Phylum: Arthropoda
- Class: Insecta
- Order: Lepidoptera
- Family: Pyralidae
- Genus: Bostra
- Species: B. mesoleucalis

Binomial name
- Bostra mesoleucalis Hampson, 1912

= Bostra mesoleucalis =

Species of moth

Bostra mesoleucalis is a species of snout moth in the genus Bostra described by George Hampson in 1912.

It is found in Sri Lanka and India.

This species has a wingspan of 20 mm.
