= Loryma radamalis =

Scientific classification
- Domain: Eukaryota
- Kingdom: Animalia
- Phylum: Arthropoda
- Class: Insecta
- Order: Lepidoptera
- Family: Pyralidae
- Genus: Loryma
- Species: L. radamalis

Binomial name
- Loryma radamalis (Ragonot, 1891)

Synonyms
- Philotis radamalis Ragonot, 1891

Species of moth

Loryma radamalis is a species of snout moth in the genus Loryma. It was described by Ragonot in 1891, and is known from Madagascar.
