= Bostra claveriei =

Scientific classification
- Domain: Eukaryota
- Kingdom: Animalia
- Phylum: Arthropoda
- Class: Insecta
- Order: Lepidoptera
- Family: Pyralidae
- Genus: Bostra
- Species: B. claveriei

Binomial name
- Bostra claveriei Rougeot, 1977

Species of moth

Bostra claveriei is a species of snout moth in the genus Bostra. It was described by Rougeot in 1977, and is known from Ethiopia.
