= Bostra lateritialis =

Scientific classification
- Kingdom: Animalia
- Phylum: Arthropoda
- Class: Insecta
- Order: Lepidoptera
- Family: Pyralidae
- Genus: Bostra
- Species: B. lateritialis

Binomial name
- Bostra lateritialis (Guenée, 1854)

Synonyms
- Stemmatophora lateritialis Guenée, 1854

Species of moth

Bostra lateritialis is a species of snout moth in the genus Bostra. It was described by Achille Guenée in 1854. It is found in South Africa.
