= Loryma sentiusalis =

Scientific classification
- Kingdom: Animalia
- Phylum: Arthropoda
- Class: Insecta
- Order: Lepidoptera
- Family: Pyralidae
- Genus: Loryma
- Species: L. sentiusalis

Binomial name
- Loryma sentiusalis Walker, 1859

Synonyms
- Ulotrichodes monotaenialis Ragonot, 1891

Species of moth

Loryma sentiusalis is a species of snout moth in the genus Loryma. It was described by Francis Walker in 1859 and is known from South Africa.
