= Bostra pallidifrons =

Scientific classification
- Kingdom: Animalia
- Phylum: Arthropoda
- Class: Insecta
- Order: Lepidoptera
- Family: Pyralidae
- Genus: Bostra
- Species: B. pallidifrons

Binomial name
- Bostra pallidifrons Hampson, 1917

Species of moth

Bostra pallidifrons is a species of snout moth in the genus Bostra. It was described by George Hampson in 1917. It is found in South Africa.
