= Bostra fascialis =

Scientific classification
- Domain: Eukaryota
- Kingdom: Animalia
- Phylum: Arthropoda
- Class: Insecta
- Order: Lepidoptera
- Family: Pyralidae
- Genus: Bostra
- Species: B. fascialis

Binomial name
- Bostra fascialis Warren, 1895

Species of moth

Bostra fascialis is a species of snout moth in the genus Bostra. It was described by Warren in 1895. It is found in India (it was described from the Khasia Hills).
