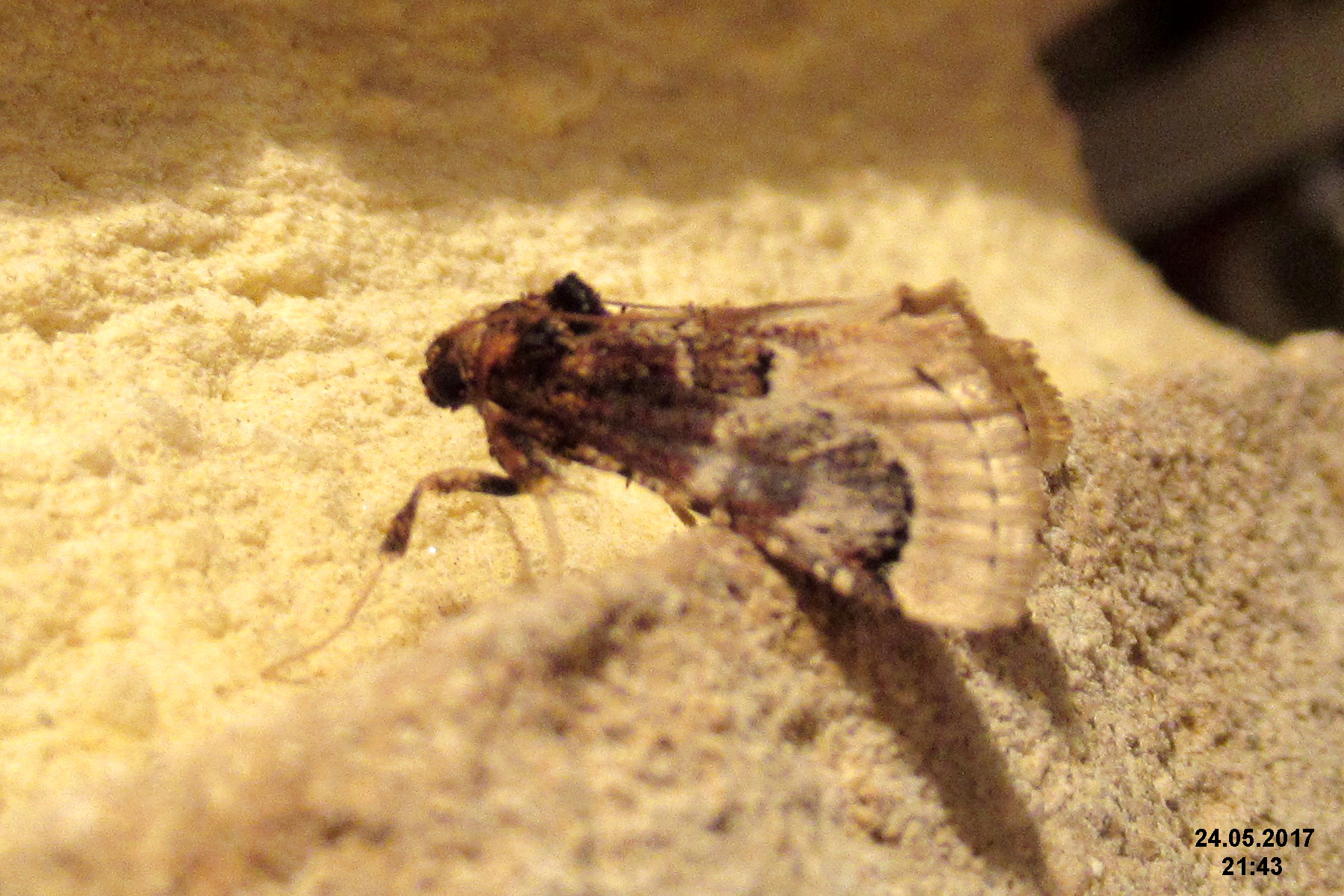

Scientific classification
- Domain: Eukaryota
- Kingdom: Animalia
- Phylum: Arthropoda
- Class: Insecta
- Order: Lepidoptera
- Family: Pyralidae
- Genus: Loryma
- Species: L. egregialis

Binomial name
- Loryma egregialis (Herrich-Schaffer, 1838)

Synonyms
- Aglossa egregialis Herrich-Schaffer, 1838; Ulotricha egregialis; Hypsopygia egregialis medusalis Millière, 1872; Ulotricha algerialis Hampson, 1900

= Loryma egregialis =

Species of moth

Loryma egregialis is a species of snout moth. It is found in Spain, Portugal, France, Italy, Greece, North Macedonia, Bulgaria, Turkey and North Africa including Algeria. The wingspan is about 18 mm.
