= Bostra pyrochroa =

Scientific classification
- Kingdom: Animalia
- Phylum: Arthropoda
- Class: Insecta
- Order: Lepidoptera
- Family: Pyralidae
- Genus: Bostra
- Species: B. pyrochroa

Binomial name
- Bostra pyrochroa (Hampson, 1916)

Synonyms
- Endotricha pyrochroa Hampson, 1916

Species of moth

Bostra pyrochroa is a species of snout moth in the genus Bostra. It was described by George Hampson in 1916, and is known from New Guinea.
