= Bostra igneusta =

Scientific classification
- Domain: Eukaryota
- Kingdom: Animalia
- Phylum: Arthropoda
- Class: Insecta
- Order: Lepidoptera
- Family: Pyralidae
- Genus: Bostra
- Species: B. igneusta

Binomial name
- Bostra igneusta C. Swinhoe, 1895

Species of moth

Bostra igneusta is a species of snout moth in the genus Bostra. It was described by Charles Swinhoe in 1895 and is known from India.
