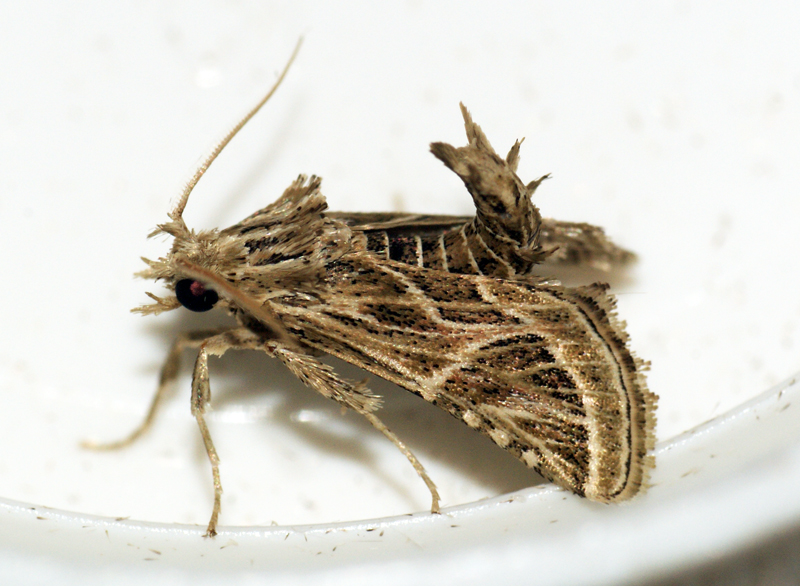
- Loryma recusata

Scientific classification
- Domain: Eukaryota
- Kingdom: Animalia
- Phylum: Arthropoda
- Class: Insecta
- Order: Lepidoptera
- Family: Pyralidae
- Subfamily: Pyralinae
- Tribe: Pyralini
- Genus: Loryma; Walker, 1859

Synonyms
- List: Beria Walker, [1863]; Essina Ragonot, 1891; Iraniodes Amsel, 1961; Tauba Walker, 1866; Philotis Ragonot, 1891; Ulotricha Lederer, 1863; Ulotrichodes Ragonot, 1891; Actenioides Warren, 1892; Anobostra Hampson, 1917; Anactenia Amsel, 1956

= Loryma (moth) =

Genus of moths

Loryma is a genus of snout moths described by Francis Walker in 1859.

== Species ==
- Loryma actenioides (Rebel, 1914)
- Loryma alluaudalis Leraut, 2009
- Loryma ambovombealis Leraut, 2009
- Loryma aridalis Rothschild, 1913
- Loryma athalialis (Walker, 1859)
- Loryma basalis (Walker, 1865)
- Loryma bilinealis (Amsel, 1961)
- Loryma callos (Viette, 1973)
- Loryma creperalis (Swinhoe, 1886)
- Loryma daganialis (Amsel, 1956)
- Loryma discimaculla (Hampson, 1917)
- Loryma egregialis (Herrich-Schäffer, 1838)
- Loryma hypotialis (Swinhoe, 1886)
- Loryma itremoalis Leraut, 2009
- Loryma marginalis Rothschild, 1921
- Loryma martinae Leraut, 2002
- Loryma masamalis Leraut, 2009
- Loryma radamalis (Ragonot, 1891)
- Loryma recusata (Walker, 1863)
- Loryma sentiusalis Walker, 1859
- Loryma sinuosalis Leraut, 2007
