= Loryma marginalis =

Scientific classification
- Domain: Eukaryota
- Kingdom: Animalia
- Phylum: Arthropoda
- Class: Insecta
- Order: Lepidoptera
- Family: Pyralidae
- Genus: Loryma
- Species: L. marginalis

Binomial name
- Loryma marginalis Rothschild, 1921

Synonyms
- Bostra marginalis Rothschild, 1921

Species of moth

Loryma marginalis is a species of snout moth in the genus Loryma. It was described by Rothschild in 1921. It is found in Iraq.
