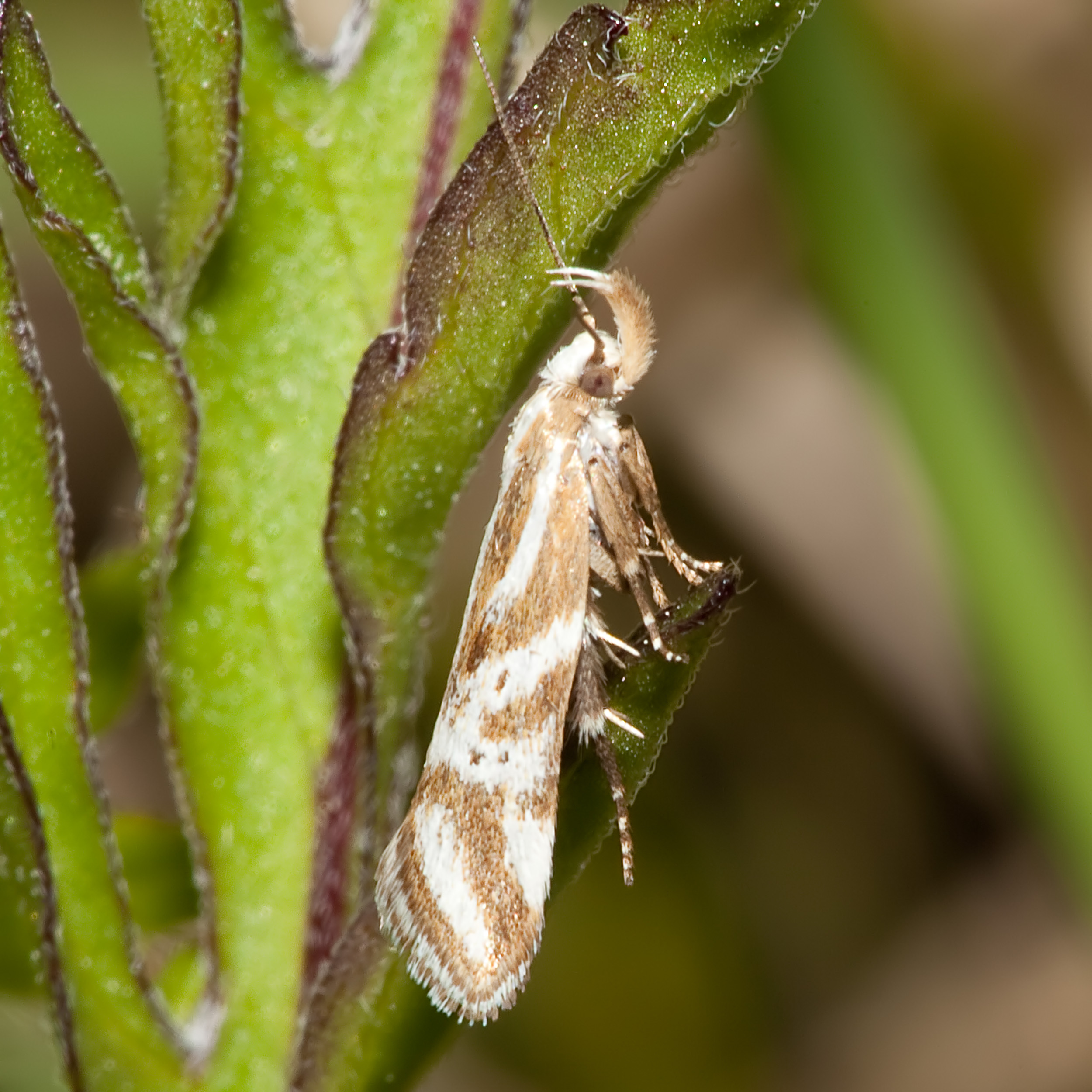
- Orophia denisella

Scientific classification
- Kingdom: Animalia
- Phylum: Arthropoda
- Clade: Pancrustacea
- Class: Insecta
- Order: Lepidoptera
- Family: Depressariidae
- Subfamily: Cryptolechiinae
- Genus: Orophia; Hubner, 1825

Type species
- Tinea denisella Denis & Schiffermüller, 1775

Synonyms
- Cephalispheira Bruand, 1851; Lamprus Agassiz, 1847; Lampros Kollar, 1832

= Orophia =

Genus of moths

Orophia is a moth genus of the superfamily Gelechioidea.

== Taxonomy ==
The systematic placement is problematic. It was often placed in tribe Orophiini of subfamily Oecophorinae, sometimes it was placed in the tribe Cryptolechiini and/or assigned to subfamily Depressariinae, which was alternatively treated as a subfamily of the Elachistidae, but today an independent family of Gelechioidea.

== Species ==
Species are:

- Orophia ammopleura (Meyrick, 1920)
- Orophia denisella (Denis & Schiffermuller, 1775)
- Orophia eariasella (Walker, 1864)
- Orophia ferrugella (Denis & Schiffermuller, 1775)
- Orophia hadromacha (Meyrick, 1937)
- Orophia haemorrhanta (Meyrick, 1924)
- Orophia haeresiella (Wallengren, 1875)
- Orophia imbutella (Christoph, 1888)
- Orophia languidula (Meyrick, 1921)
- Orophia madagascariensis (Viette, 1951)
- Orophia melicoma (Meyrick, 1931)
- Orophia mendosella (Zeller, 1868)
- Orophia ochroxyla (Meyrick, 1937)
- Orophia pachystoma (Meyrick, 1921)
- Orophia quadripunctella (Viette, 1955)
- Orophia roseoflavida (Walsingham, 1881)
- Orophia sordidella (Hübner, 1796)
- Orophia taurina (Meyrick, 1928)
- Orophia tetrasticta (Meyrick, 1917)
- Orophia thesmophila (Meyrick, 1930)
- Orophia toulgoetianum (Viette, 1954)
- Orophia tranquilla (Meyrick, 1927)
- Orophia transfuga (Meyrick, 1911)
- Orophia xanthosarca (Meyrick, 1917)
- Orophia zernyi (Szent-Ivany, 1942)
