= Orophia haeresiella =

Scientific classification
- Kingdom: Animalia
- Phylum: Arthropoda
- Class: Insecta
- Order: Lepidoptera
- Family: Depressariidae
- Genus: Orophia
- Species: O. haeresiella

Binomial name
- Orophia haeresiella (Wallengren, 1875)

Synonyms
- Idiopteryx haeresiella Wallengren, 1875; Cryptolechia haeresiella

Species of moth

Orophia haeresiella is a species of moth in the family Depressariidae. It was described by Wallengren in 1875, and is known from South Africa.
