= Orophia quadripunctella =

Scientific classification
- Kingdom: Animalia
- Phylum: Arthropoda
- Class: Insecta
- Order: Lepidoptera
- Family: Depressariidae
- Genus: Orophia
- Species: O. quadripunctella

Binomial name
- Orophia quadripunctella (Viette, 1955)

Synonyms
- Cryptolechia quadripunctella Viette, 1955

Species of moth

Orophia quadripunctella is a species of moth in the family Depressariidae. It was described by Viette in 1955, and is known from Madagascar.
