= Orophia madagascariensis =

Scientific classification
- Kingdom: Animalia
- Phylum: Arthropoda
- Class: Insecta
- Order: Lepidoptera
- Family: Depressariidae
- Genus: Orophia
- Species: O. madagascariensis

Binomial name
- Orophia madagascariensis (Viette, 1951)

Synonyms
- Cryptolechia madagascariensis Viette, 1951

Species of moth

Orophia madagascariensis is a species of moth in the family Depressariidae. It was described by Viette in 1951, and is known from Madagascar.

The larvae feed on fern species.
