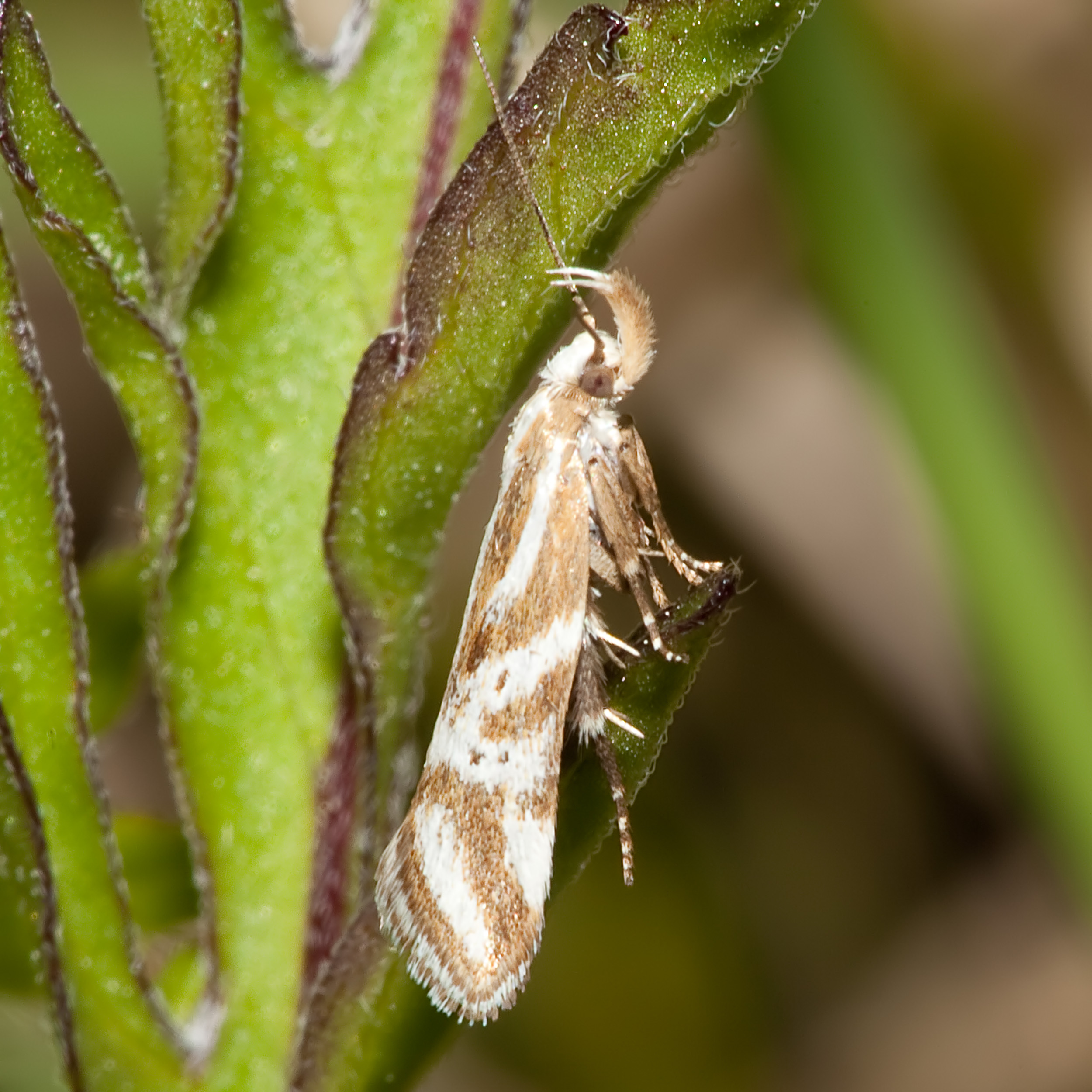

Scientific classification
- Domain: Eukaryota
- Kingdom: Animalia
- Phylum: Arthropoda
- Class: Insecta
- Order: Lepidoptera
- Family: Depressariidae
- Genus: Orophia
- Species: O. denisella

Binomial name
- Orophia denisella (Denis & Schiffermüller, 1775)

Synonyms
- Tinea denisella Denis & Schiffermüller, 1775; Cephalispheira denisella; Lampros monastricella Fischer von Röslerstamm, 1843

= Orophia denisella =

Species of moth

Orophia denisella is a species of moth in the family Depressariidae. It was described by Michael Denis and Ignaz Schiffermüller in 1775. It is found from Spain and France to Romania and Bulgaria and from Germany to Italy and North Macedonia. It has also been recorded from Russia.
