= Orophia eariasella =

Scientific classification
- Kingdom: Animalia
- Phylum: Arthropoda
- Class: Insecta
- Order: Lepidoptera
- Family: Depressariidae
- Genus: Orophia
- Species: O. eariasella

Binomial name
- Orophia eariasella (Walker, 1864)

Synonyms
- Cryptolechia eariasella Walker, 1864

Species of moth

Orophia eariasella is a species of moth in the family Depressariidae. It was described by Francis Walker in 1864, and is known from South Africa.
