= Orophia roseoflavida =

Scientific classification
- Kingdom: Animalia
- Phylum: Arthropoda
- Clade: Pancrustacea
- Class: Insecta
- Order: Lepidoptera
- Family: Depressariidae
- Genus: Orophia
- Species: O. roseoflavida

Binomial name
- Orophia roseoflavida (Walsingham, 1881)

Synonyms
- Cryptolechia roseoflavida Walsingham, 1881

Species of moth

Orophia roseoflavida is a species of moth in the family Depressariidae. It was described by Walsingham in 1881, and is known from South Africa.
