= Orophia ochroxyla =

Scientific classification
- Kingdom: Animalia
- Phylum: Arthropoda
- Class: Insecta
- Order: Lepidoptera
- Family: Depressariidae
- Genus: Orophia
- Species: O. ochroxyla

Binomial name
- Orophia ochroxyla (Meyrick, 1937)

Synonyms
- Cryptolechia ochroxyla Meyrick, 1937

Species of moth

Orophia ochroxyla is a species of moth in the family Depressariidae. It was described by Edward Meyrick in 1937, and is known from South Africa.
