= Orophia toulgoetianum =

Scientific classification
- Kingdom: Animalia
- Phylum: Arthropoda
- Class: Insecta
- Order: Lepidoptera
- Family: Depressariidae
- Genus: Orophia
- Species: O. toulgoetianum

Binomial name
- Orophia toulgoetianum (Viette, 1954)

Synonyms
- Cryptolechia toulgoetianum Viette, 1954

Species of moth

Orophia toulgoetianum is a species of moth in the family Depressariidae. It was described by Viette in 1954, and is known from Madagascar.
