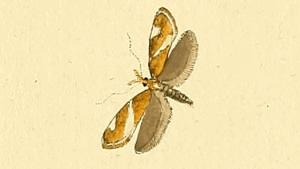

Scientific classification
- Kingdom: Animalia
- Phylum: Arthropoda
- Clade: Pancrustacea
- Class: Insecta
- Order: Lepidoptera
- Family: Depressariidae
- Genus: Orophia
- Species: O. sordidella

Binomial name
- Orophia sordidella (Hübner, 1796)

Synonyms
- Tinea sordidella Hübner, 1796; Cephalispheira sordidella

= Orophia sordidella =

Species of moth

Orophia sordidella is a species of univoltine, xerothermic moth in the family Depressariidae. It was described by Jacob Hübner in 1796. It is found in most of Europe, except Ireland, Great Britain, Fennoscandia, Portugal, the Baltic region, Poland, Ukraine and Bulgaria.

The wingspan is 13–17 mm. There is one generation per year with adults on wing from May to early September.

The larvae feed on Leguminosae species.
