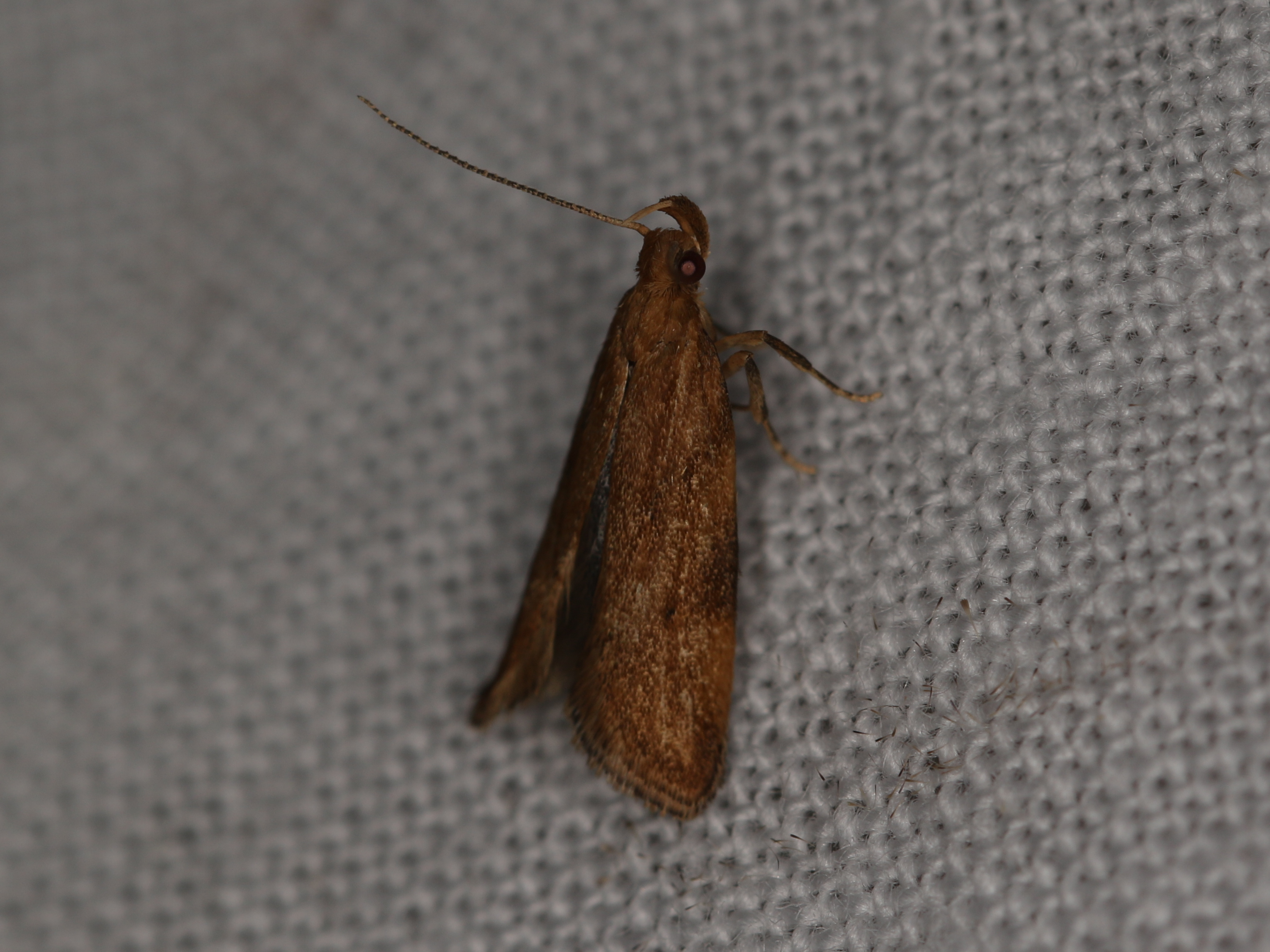

Scientific classification
- Domain: Eukaryota
- Kingdom: Animalia
- Phylum: Arthropoda
- Class: Insecta
- Order: Lepidoptera
- Family: Depressariidae
- Genus: Orophia
- Species: O. ferrugella

Binomial name
- Orophia ferrugella (Denis & Schiffermüller, 1775)

Synonyms
- Tinea ferrugella Denis & Schiffermüller, 1775; Cephalispheira ferrugella; Cryptolechia ferrugella; Rhinosia ferrugella

= Orophia ferrugella =

Species of moth

Orophia ferrugella is a species of moth in the family Depressariidae. It was described by Michael Denis and Ignaz Schiffermüller in 1775. It is found in most of Europe, except Ireland, Great Britain, the Netherlands, Portugal, Ukraine, Slovenia, and Greece.

The wingspan is 12–16 mm. Adults are on wing from May to August in one generation per year.

The larvae feed on Campanula persicifolia. The larvae mine the leaves of their host plant. Larvae are found in spring.
