= Orophia thesmophila =

Scientific classification
- Kingdom: Animalia
- Phylum: Arthropoda
- Class: Insecta
- Order: Lepidoptera
- Family: Depressariidae
- Genus: Orophia
- Species: O. thesmophila

Binomial name
- Orophia thesmophila (Meyrick, 1930)

Synonyms
- Cryptolechia thesmophila Meyrick, 1930

Species of moth

Orophia thesmophila is a species of moth in the family Depressariidae. It was described by Edward Meyrick in 1930, and is known from Mauritius.
