= Orophia pachystoma =

Scientific classification
- Kingdom: Animalia
- Phylum: Arthropoda
- Class: Insecta
- Order: Lepidoptera
- Family: Depressariidae
- Genus: Orophia
- Species: O. pachystoma

Binomial name
- Orophia pachystoma (Meyrick, 1921)

Synonyms
- Cryptolechia pachystoma Meyrick, 1921

Species of moth

Orophia pachystoma is a species of moth in the family Depressariidae. It was described by Edward Meyrick in 1921. It is found in Zimbabwe.
