= Orophia languidula =

Scientific classification
- Domain: Eukaryota
- Kingdom: Animalia
- Phylum: Arthropoda
- Class: Insecta
- Order: Lepidoptera
- Family: Depressariidae
- Genus: Orophia
- Species: O. languidula

Binomial name
- Orophia languidula (Meyrick, 1921)

Synonyms
- Cryptolechia languidula Meyrick, 1921

Species of moth

Orophia languidula is a species of moth in the family Depressariidae. It was described by Edward Meyrick in 1921, and is known from Mozambique.
