= Orophia taurina =

Scientific classification
- Kingdom: Animalia
- Phylum: Arthropoda
- Class: Insecta
- Order: Lepidoptera
- Family: Depressariidae
- Genus: Orophia
- Species: O. taurina

Binomial name
- Orophia taurina (Meyrick, 1928)

Synonyms
- Cryptolechia taurina Meyrick, 1928

Species of moth

Orophia taurina is a species of moth in the family Depressariidae. It was described by Edward Meyrick in 1928, and is known from Sierra Leone.
