= Orophia ammopleura =

Scientific classification
- Kingdom: Animalia
- Phylum: Arthropoda
- Class: Insecta
- Order: Lepidoptera
- Family: Depressariidae
- Genus: Orophia
- Species: O. ammopleura

Binomial name
- Orophia ammopleura (Meyrick, 1920)

Synonyms
- Cryptolechia ammopleura Meyrick, 1920

Species of moth

Orophia ammopleura is a species of moth in the family Depressariidae. It was described by Edward Meyrick in 1920, and is known from South Africa.
