= Orophia transfuga =

Scientific classification
- Kingdom: Animalia
- Phylum: Arthropoda
- Class: Insecta
- Order: Lepidoptera
- Family: Depressariidae
- Genus: Orophia
- Species: O. transfuga

Binomial name
- Orophia transfuga (Meyrick, 1911)

Synonyms
- Cryptolechia transfuga Meyrick, 1911

Species of moth

Orophia transfuga is a species of moth in the family Depressariidae. It was first described by Edward Meyrick in 1911, and is known from South Africa.
