= Orophia mendosella =

Scientific classification
- Kingdom: Animalia
- Phylum: Arthropoda
- Clade: Pancrustacea
- Class: Insecta
- Order: Lepidoptera
- Family: Depressariidae
- Genus: Orophia
- Species: O. mendosella

Binomial name
- Orophia mendosella (Zeller, 1868)

Synonyms
- Symmoca mendosella Zeller, 1868; Cephalispheira mendosella

Species of moth

Orophia mendosella is a species of moth in the family Depressariidae. It was described by Zeller in 1868. It is found in Italy, Austria and Slovenia.
