= Orophia zernyi =

Scientific classification
- Domain: Eukaryota
- Kingdom: Animalia
- Phylum: Arthropoda
- Class: Insecta
- Order: Lepidoptera
- Family: Depressariidae
- Genus: Orophia
- Species: O. zernyi

Binomial name
- Orophia zernyi (Szent-Ivány, 1942)

Synonyms
- Rhinosia zernyi Szent-Ivany, 1942; Cephalispheira zernyi; Rhinosia apicisignella Klimesch, 1942

Species of moth

Orophia zernyi is a species of moth in the family Depressariidae. It was described by Szent-Ivany in 1942. The species is found in Croatia.
