= Orophia melicoma =

Scientific classification
- Kingdom: Animalia
- Phylum: Arthropoda
- Class: Insecta
- Order: Lepidoptera
- Family: Depressariidae
- Genus: Orophia
- Species: O. melicoma

Binomial name
- Orophia melicoma (Meyrick, 1931)

Synonyms
- Cryptolechia melicoma Meyrick, 1931

Species of moth

Orophia melicoma is a species of moth in the family Depressariidae. It was described by Edward Meyrick in 1931, and is known from Sierra Leone.
