= Orophia haemorrhanta =

Scientific classification
- Kingdom: Animalia
- Phylum: Arthropoda
- Clade: Pancrustacea
- Class: Insecta
- Order: Lepidoptera
- Family: Depressariidae
- Genus: Orophia
- Species: O. haemorrhanta

Binomial name
- Orophia haemorrhanta (Meyrick, 1924)

Synonyms
- Cryptolechia haemorrhanta Meyrick, 1924

Species of moth

Orophia haemorrhanta is a species of moth in the family Depressariidae. It was described by Edward Meyrick in 1924 and is known from the Democratic Republic of the Congo.
