= Orophia imbutella =

Scientific classification
- Domain: Eukaryota
- Kingdom: Animalia
- Phylum: Arthropoda
- Class: Insecta
- Order: Lepidoptera
- Family: Depressariidae
- Genus: Orophia
- Species: O. imbutella

Binomial name
- Orophia imbutella (Christoph, 1888)

Synonyms
- Depressaria imbutella Christoph, 1888

Species of moth

Orophia imbutella is a moth in the family Depressariidae. It was described by Hugo Theodor Christoph in 1888. It is found in Georgia.
