= Orophia xanthosarca =

Scientific classification
- Kingdom: Animalia
- Phylum: Arthropoda
- Class: Insecta
- Order: Lepidoptera
- Family: Depressariidae
- Genus: Orophia
- Species: O. xanthosarca

Binomial name
- Orophia xanthosarca (Meyrick, 1917)

Synonyms
- Cryptolechia xanthosarca Meyrick, 1917

Species of moth

Orophia xanthosarca is a species of moth in the family Depressariidae. It was described by Edward Meyrick in 1917, and is known from South Africa.
