= Orophia tranquilla =

Scientific classification
- Kingdom: Animalia
- Phylum: Arthropoda
- Class: Insecta
- Order: Lepidoptera
- Family: Depressariidae
- Genus: Orophia
- Species: O. tranquilla

Binomial name
- Orophia tranquilla (Meyrick, 1927)

Synonyms
- Cryptolechia tranquilla Meyrick, 1927

Species of moth

Orophia tranquilla is a species of moth in the family Depressariidae. It was described by Edward Meyrick in 1927, and is known from South Africa. Tranquilla comes from the Latin tranquillō, meaning quiet, calm, or tranquil, often when referring to water.
