= Orophia tetrasticta =

Scientific classification
- Kingdom: Animalia
- Phylum: Arthropoda
- Class: Insecta
- Order: Lepidoptera
- Family: Depressariidae
- Genus: Orophia
- Species: O. tetrasticta

Binomial name
- Orophia tetrasticta (Meyrick, 1917)

Synonyms
- Cryptolechia tetrasticta Meyrick, 1917

Species of moth

Orophia tetrasticta is a species of moth in the family Depressariidae. It was described by Edward Meyrick in 1917, and is known from South Africa.
