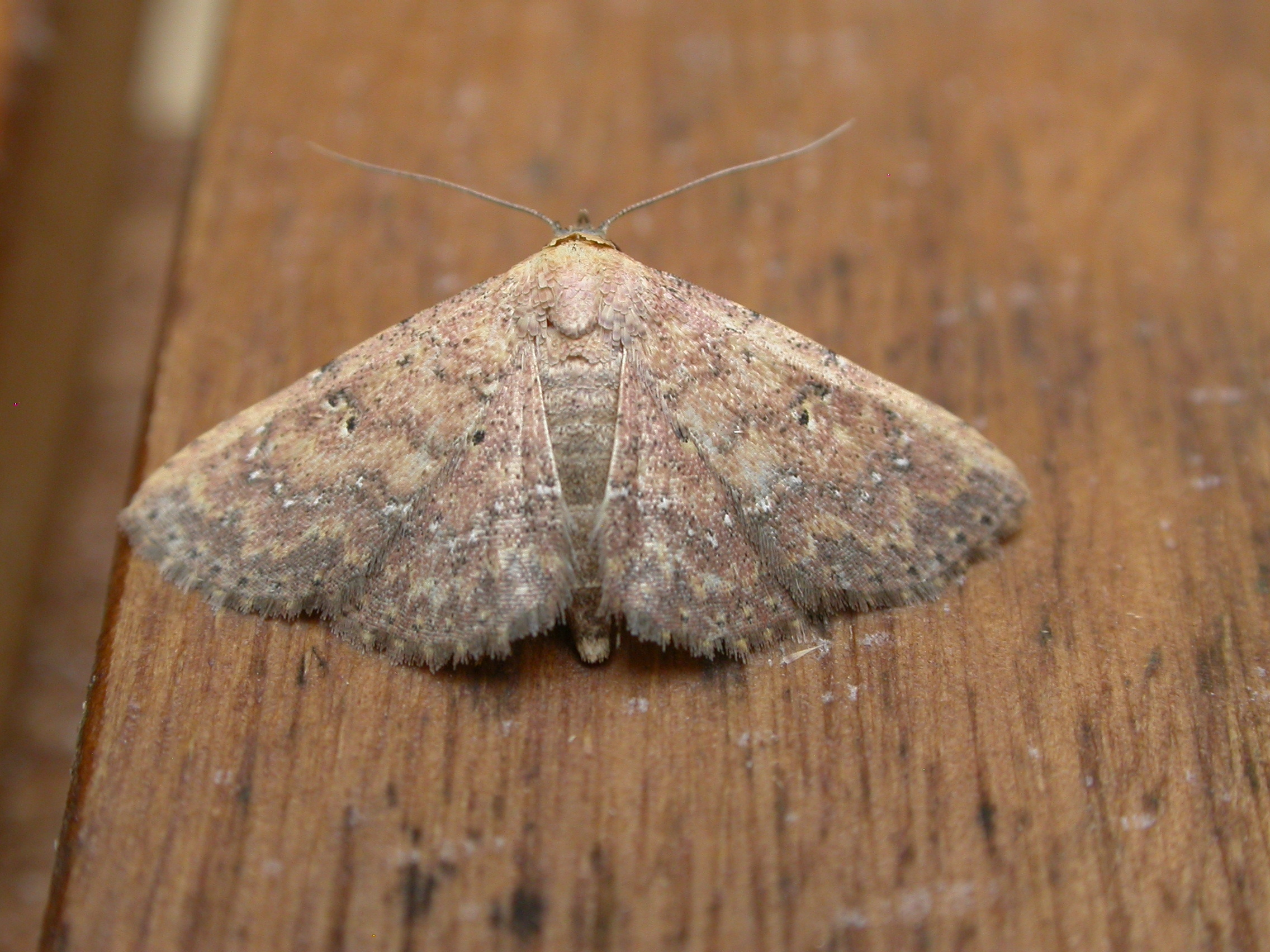
- Cerynea trogobasis

Scientific classification
- Kingdom: Animalia
- Phylum: Arthropoda
- Class: Insecta
- Order: Lepidoptera
- Superfamily: Noctuoidea
- Family: Erebidae
- Subfamily: Boletobiinae
- Genus: Cerynea; Walker, 1859

Synonyms
- Phanaspa Walker, [1866]; Busmadis Walker, 1866

= Cerynea =

Genus of moths

Cerynea is a genus of moths of the family Erebidae erected by Francis Walker in 1859.

== Etymology ==
Cerynea is possibly derived from the hills of Cerynea, where Hercules performed the third labour (the capturing of the Cerynean Hind).

== Species ==
- Cerynea acidalia Berio, 1960
- Cerynea albivitta Hampson, 1918
- Cerynea albocostata Berio, 1960
- Cerynea ampafana Viette, 1976
- Cerynea apicalis Berio, 1960
- Cerynea argentescens Hampson, 1910
- Cerynea bicolors Berio, 1960
- Cerynea cadoreli Viette, 1976
- Cerynea contentaria (Walker, 1861)
- Cerynea digonia Hampson, 1914
- Cerynea disjunctaria (Walker, 1861)
- Cerynea endotrichalis Hampson, 1910
- Cerynea falcigera Berio, 1960
- Cerynea fissilinea Hampson, 1910
- Cerynea flavibasalis Hampson, 1910
- Cerynea flavicostata (Holland, 1894)
- Cerynea homala Prout, 1925
- Cerynea ignealis Hampson, 1910
- Cerynea ignetincta Berio, 1960
- Cerynea igniaria (Hampson, 1898)
- Cerynea limbobrunnea D. S. Fletcher, 1961
- Cerynea minuta Berio, 1960
- Cerynea nigrapicata Berio, 1960
- Cerynea nigropuncta D. S. Fletcher, 1961
- Cerynea oblops Viette, 1961
- Cerynea ochreana (Bethune-Baker, 1908)
- Cerynea omphisalis Walker, 1859
- Cerynea ovata Berio, 1977
- Cerynea pallens Hampson, 1918
- Cerynea perrubra Hampson, 1910
- Cerynea pilipalpus Hulstaert, 1924
- Cerynea porphyrea Hampson, 1910
- Cerynea pseudovinosa Berio, 1960
- Cerynea punctulata Berio, 1960
- Cerynea ragazzii Berio, 1937
- Cerynea rubra Swinhoe, 1905
- Cerynea sepiata Warren, 1913
- Cerynea sumatrana Swinhoe, 1918
- Cerynea tetramelanosticta Berio, 1954
- Cerynea thermesialis (Walker, [1866])
- Cerynea trichobasis Hampson, 1910
- Cerynea trogobasis Hampson, 1910
- Cerynea ustula (Hampson, 1898)
- Cerynea veterata Viette, 1961
- Cerynea vinosa Berio, 1960
- Cerynea virescens Hampson, 1910
- Cerynea xenia Swinhoe, 1902
