= Cerynea tetramelanosticta =

Scientific classification
- Domain: Eukaryota
- Kingdom: Animalia
- Phylum: Arthropoda
- Class: Insecta
- Order: Lepidoptera
- Superfamily: Noctuoidea
- Family: Erebidae
- Genus: Cerynea
- Species: C. tetramelanosticta

Binomial name
- Cerynea tetramelanosticta Berio, 1954

Synonyms
- Rhesala tetramelanosticta (Berio, 1954)

Species of moth

Cerynea tetramelanosticta is a species of moth of the family Erebidae first described by Emilio Berio in 1954. It is found in Tanzania (on Zanzibar) and in Mauritius.
