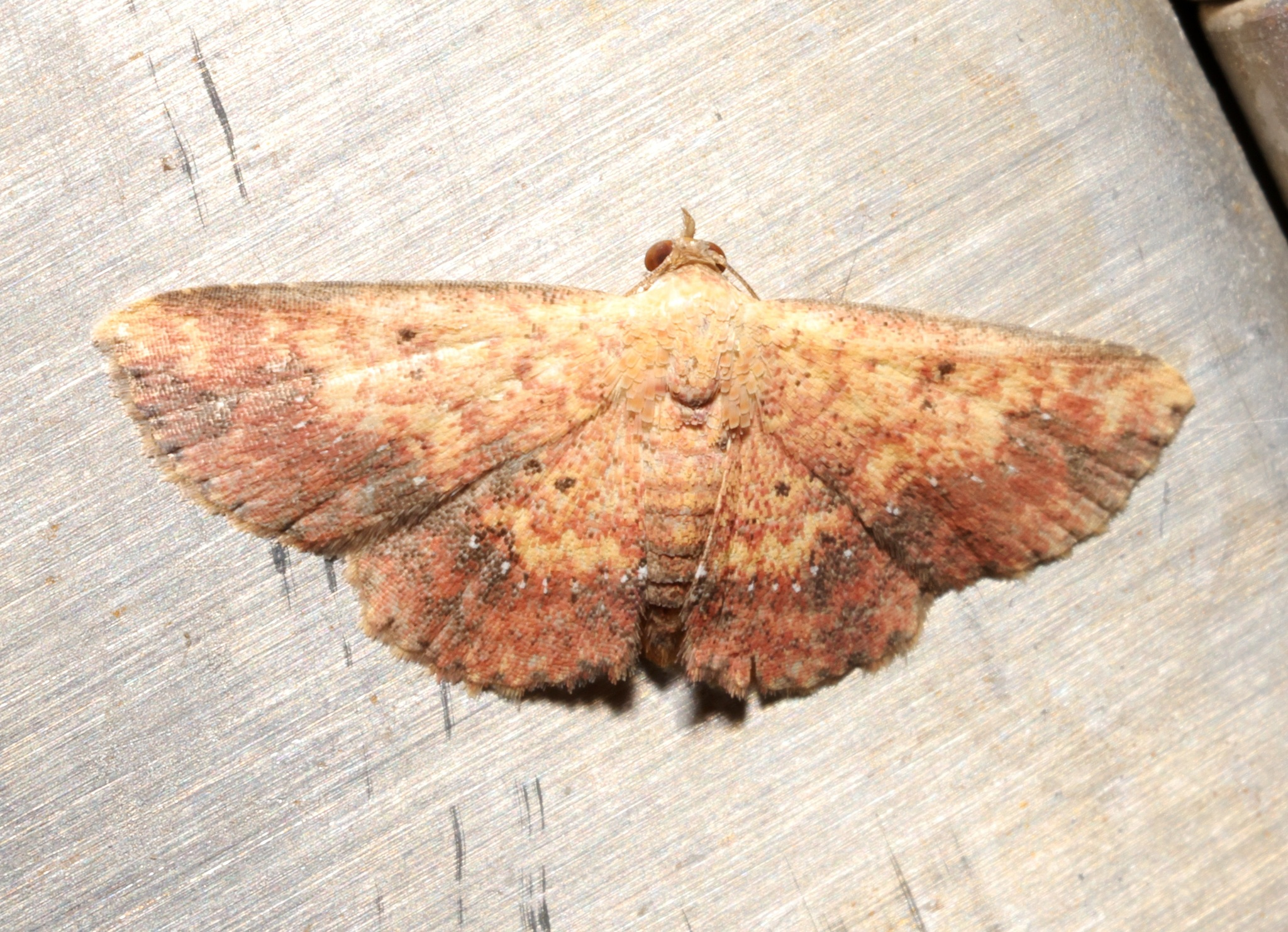

Scientific classification
- Kingdom: Animalia
- Phylum: Arthropoda
- Clade: Pancrustacea
- Class: Insecta
- Order: Lepidoptera
- Superfamily: Noctuoidea
- Family: Erebidae
- Genus: Cerynea
- Species: C. ustula

Binomial name
- Cerynea ustula (Hampson, 1897)

Synonyms
- Zurobata ustula Hampson, 1898

= Cerynea ustula =

Species of moth

Cerynea ustula is a moth of the family Erebidae first described by George Hampson in 1897. It is found in Sri Lanka and the Andaman Islands.
