= Cerynea fissilinea =

Scientific classification
- Kingdom: Animalia
- Phylum: Arthropoda
- Class: Insecta
- Order: Lepidoptera
- Superfamily: Noctuoidea
- Family: Erebidae
- Genus: Cerynea
- Species: C. fissilinea

Binomial name
- Cerynea fissilinea Hampson, 1910

Species of moth

Cerynea fissilinea is a species of moth in the family Erebidae first described by George Hampson in 1910. It is found in Madagascar.
