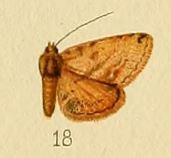

Scientific classification
- Domain: Eukaryota
- Kingdom: Animalia
- Phylum: Arthropoda
- Class: Insecta
- Order: Lepidoptera
- Superfamily: Noctuoidea
- Family: Erebidae
- Genus: Cerynea
- Species: C. ochreana

Binomial name
- Cerynea ochreana (Bethune-Baker, 1908)

Synonyms
- Dahlia ochreana Bethune-Baker, 1908

= Cerynea ochreana =

Species of moth

Cerynea ochreana is a species of moth in the family Erebidae first described by George Thomas Bethune-Baker in 1908. It is found in Papua New Guinea.
