= Cerynea contentaria =

Scientific classification
- Kingdom: Animalia
- Phylum: Arthropoda
- Class: Insecta
- Order: Lepidoptera
- Superfamily: Noctuoidea
- Family: Erebidae
- Genus: Cerynea
- Species: C. contentaria

Binomial name
- Cerynea contentaria (Walker, 1861)

Synonyms
- Ephyra contentaria Walker, 1861; Chusaris punctilinealis Walker, [1866]

Species of moth

Cerynea contentaria is a moth of the family Erebidae first described by Francis Walker in 1861.

This species is found in areas of Sri Lanka and Borneo.
