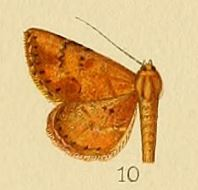

Scientific classification
- Kingdom: Animalia
- Phylum: Arthropoda
- Class: Insecta
- Order: Lepidoptera
- Superfamily: Noctuoidea
- Family: Erebidae
- Genus: Cerynea
- Species: C. ignealis

Binomial name
- Cerynea ignealis Hampson, 1910

= Cerynea ignealis =

Species of moth

Cerynea ignealis is a species of moth in the family Erebidae first described by George Hampson in 1910. It is found in Kenya, Madagascar, South Africa and in São Tomé and Príncipe.
