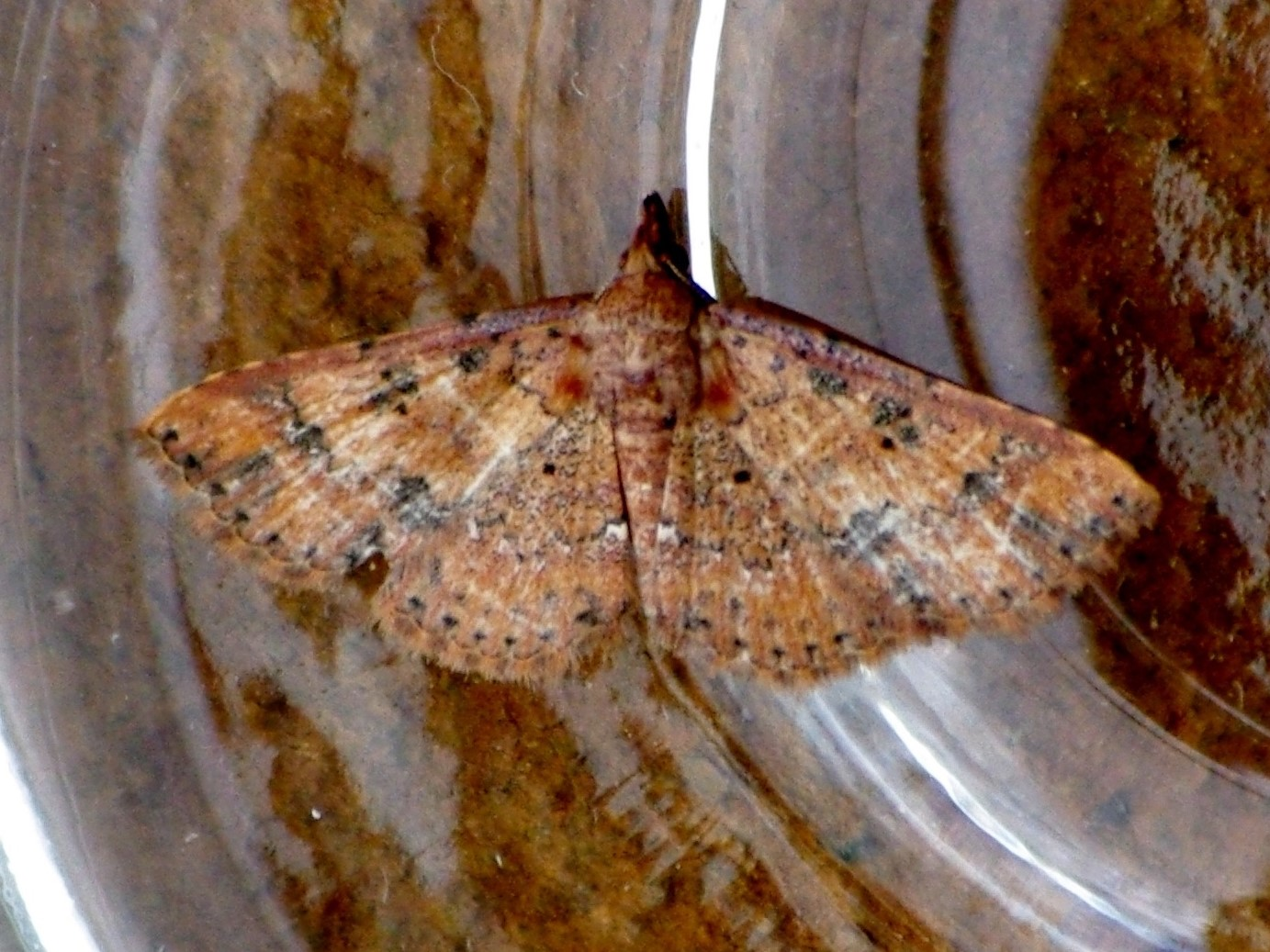

Scientific classification
- Kingdom: Animalia
- Phylum: Arthropoda
- Class: Insecta
- Order: Lepidoptera
- Superfamily: Noctuoidea
- Family: Erebidae
- Genus: Cerynea
- Species: C. porphyrea

Binomial name
- Cerynea porphyrea Hampson, 1910

= Cerynea porphyrea =

Species of moth

Cerynea porphyrea is a species of moth in the family Erebidae. It is found in Madagascar.
