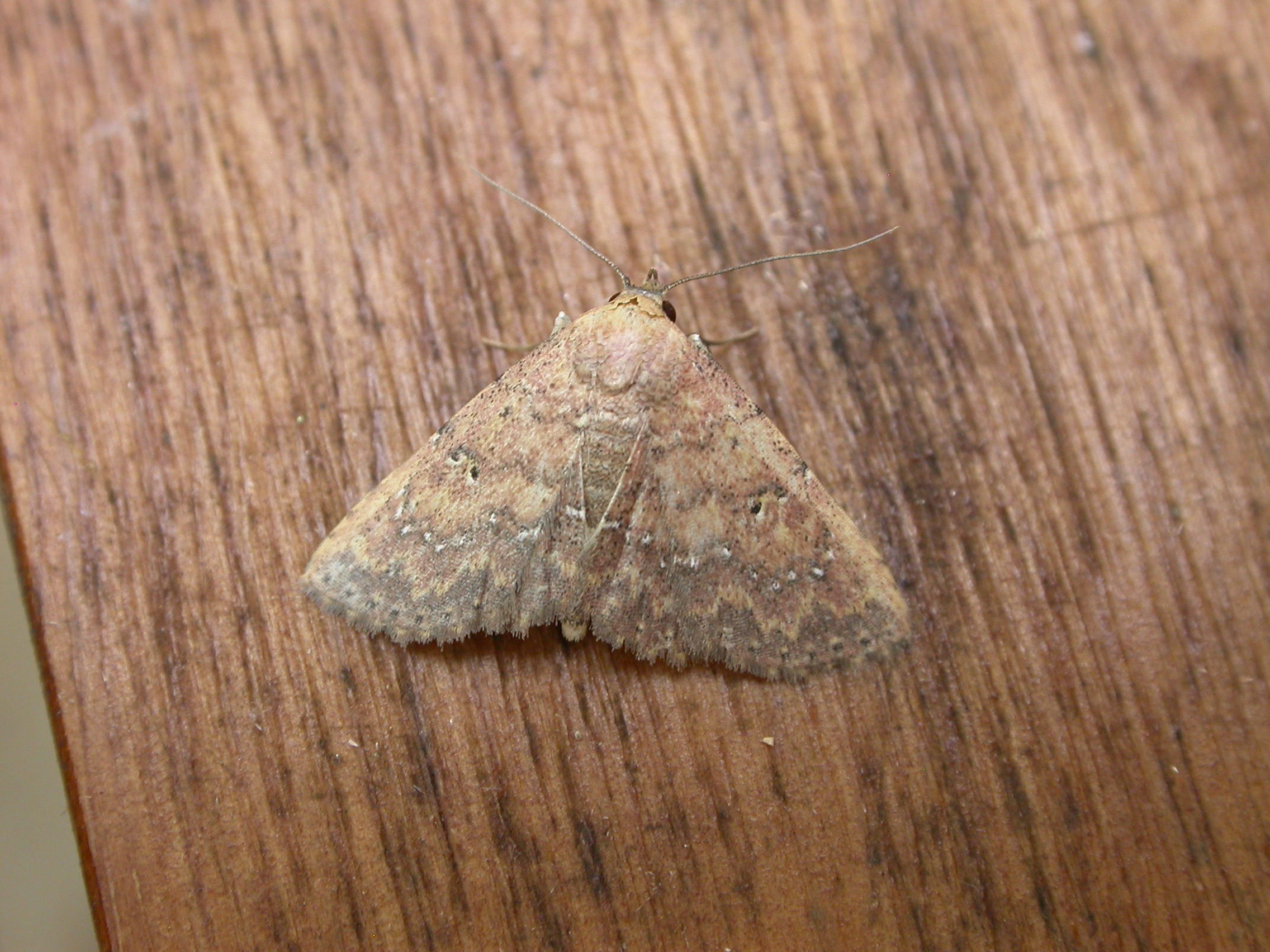

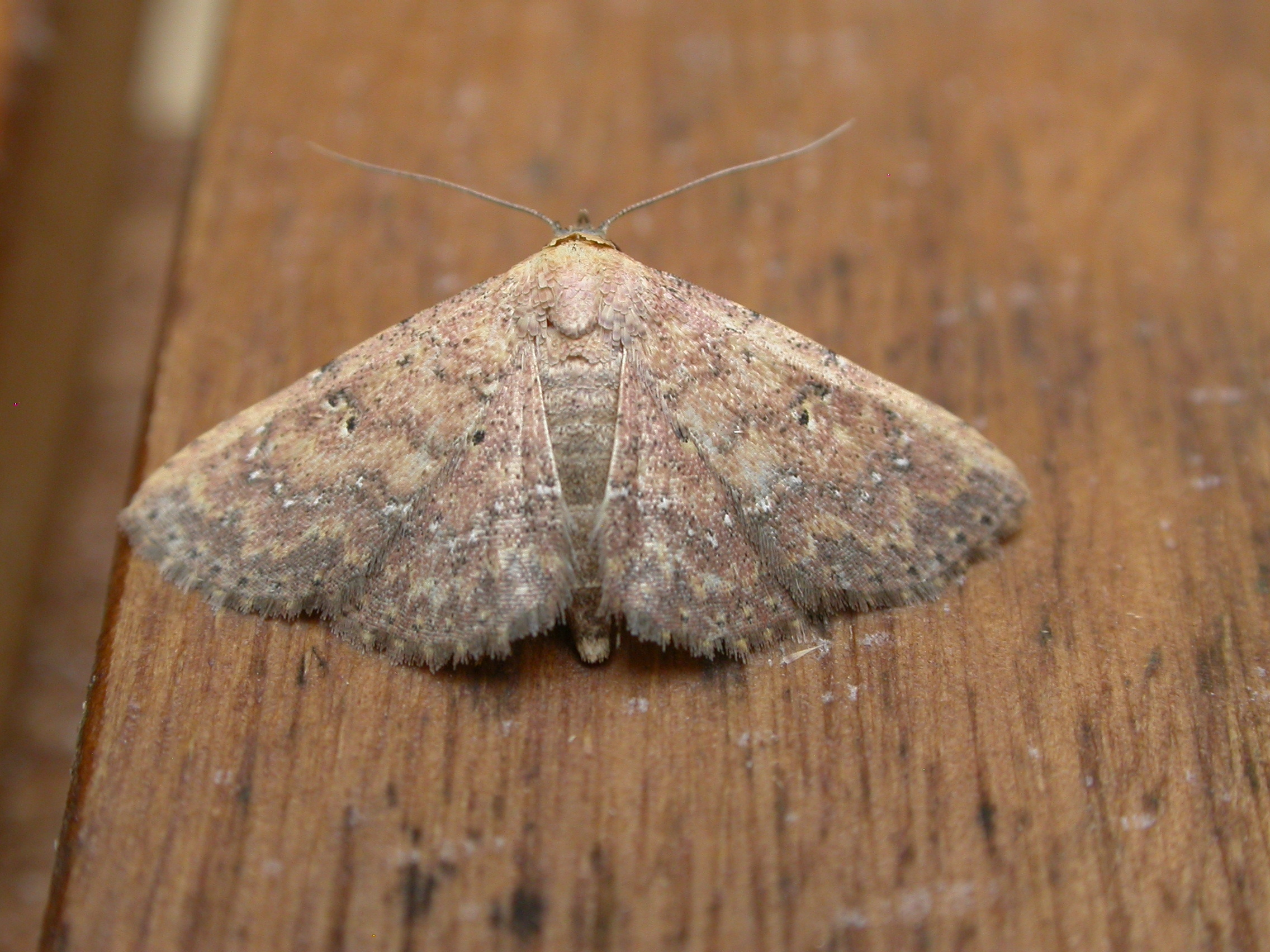

Scientific classification
- Kingdom: Animalia
- Phylum: Arthropoda
- Clade: Pancrustacea
- Class: Insecta
- Order: Lepidoptera
- Superfamily: Noctuoidea
- Family: Erebidae
- Genus: Cerynea
- Species: C. trogobasis

Binomial name
- Cerynea trogobasis Hampson, 1910

Synonyms
- Cerynea trogobasis kuhni Warren, 1913; Cerynea sobria Warren, 1913; Cerynea vivida Warren, 1913

= Cerynea trogobasis =

Species of moth

Cerynea trogobasis is a species of moth of the family Erebidae first described by George Hampson in 1910. It is found in Queensland in Australia and the Kai Islands of Indonesia.
