= Cerynea thermesialis =

Scientific classification
- Kingdom: Animalia
- Phylum: Arthropoda
- Class: Insecta
- Order: Lepidoptera
- Superfamily: Noctuoidea
- Family: Erebidae
- Genus: Cerynea
- Species: C. thermesialis

Binomial name
- Cerynea thermesialis (Walker, 1866)

Synonyms
- Phanaspa thermesialis Walker, 1866; Cerynea rhodotrichia Hampson, 1910

Species of moth

Cerynea thermesialis, the hot snout, is a species of moth in the family Erebidae first described by Francis Walker in 1866. It is found throughout subtropical Africa, from Sierra Leone to Madagascar; and from Kenya to South Africa.
