= Idiopteryx obitsyella =

Scientific classification
- Kingdom: Animalia
- Phylum: Arthropoda
- Class: Insecta
- Order: Lepidoptera
- Family: Lecithoceridae
- Genus: Idiopteryx
- Species: I. obitsyella

Binomial name
- Idiopteryx obitsyella Viette, 1986

Species of moth

Idiopteryx obitsyella is a moth in the family Lecithoceridae. It was described by Pierre Viette in 1986. It is known from Madagascar.
