= Idiopteryx tananaella =

Scientific classification
- Kingdom: Animalia
- Phylum: Arthropoda
- Class: Insecta
- Order: Lepidoptera
- Family: Lecithoceridae
- Genus: Idiopteryx
- Species: I. tananaella

Binomial name
- Idiopteryx tananaella Viette, 1985

Species of moth

Idiopteryx tananaella is a moth in the family Lecithoceridae. It was described by Pierre Viette in 1985. It is known from Madagascar.
