= Idiopteryx descarpentriesella =

Scientific classification
- Kingdom: Animalia
- Phylum: Arthropoda
- Class: Insecta
- Order: Lepidoptera
- Family: Lecithoceridae
- Genus: Idiopteryx
- Species: I. descarpentriesella

Binomial name
- Idiopteryx descarpentriesella Viette, 1954

Species of moth

Idiopteryx descarpentriesella is a moth in the family Lecithoceridae. It was described by Pierre Viette in 1954. It is known from Madagascar.
