= Idiopteryx =

Scientific classification
- Kingdom: Animalia
- Phylum: Arthropoda
- Class: Insecta
- Order: Lepidoptera
- Family: Lecithoceridae
- Genus: Idiopteryx; Walsingham, 1891

Type species
- *Cryptolechia obliquella Walsingham, 1881

Genus of moths

Idiopteryx is a genus of moth in the family Lecithoceridae.

== Species ==
- Idiopteryx adelella (Viette, 1955) (from Madagascar)
- Idiopteryx descarpentriesella Viette, 1954 (from Madagascar)
- Idiopteryx marionella Viette, 1954 (from Madagascar)
- Idiopteryx obitsyella Viette, 1986 (from Madagascar)
- Idiopteryx obliquella (Walsingham, 1881) (from South Africa)
- Idiopteryx tananaella Viette, 1985 (from Madagascar)
