= Idiopteryx obliquella =

Scientific classification
- Kingdom: Animalia
- Phylum: Arthropoda
- Class: Insecta
- Order: Lepidoptera
- Family: Lecithoceridae
- Genus: Idiopteryx
- Species: I. obliquella

Binomial name
- Idiopteryx obliquella (Walsingham, 1881)

Synonyms
- Cryptolechia obliquella Walsingham, 1881; Dragmatucha obsepta Meyrick, 1918

Species of moth

Idiopteryx obliquella is a moth in the family Lecithoceridae. It was described by Thomas de Grey, 6th Baron Walsingham, in 1881. It is known from South Africa.

The wingspan is about 15 mm. The forewings are creamy white, with a brown spot at the extreme base of the costa, a narrow brown fascia near the base slightly curved outwards. A wide reduplicated brown wedge-shaped fascia occupying two-thirds of the costal and one-half of the dorsal space beyond the middle of the wing, its central space showing the pale ground colour in more or less amalgamated longitudinal streaks. Its inner edge straight, its outer edge obliquely parallel to the apical margin. Before this, running from the apex to within the anal angle is another narrow brownish oblique fascia. The hindwings are whitish cinereous, with two subobsolete brownish costal streaks before the apex.
