= Tsirananaclia formosa =

Scientific classification
- Domain: Eukaryota
- Kingdom: Animalia
- Phylum: Arthropoda
- Class: Insecta
- Order: Lepidoptera
- Superfamily: Noctuoidea
- Family: Erebidae
- Subfamily: Arctiinae
- Genus: Tsirananaclia
- Species: T. formosa

Binomial name
- Tsirananaclia formosa Griveaud, 1973

Species of moth

Tsirananaclia formosa is a moth in the subfamily Arctiinae. It was described by Paul Griveaud in 1973. It is found on Madagascar.
