= Tsirananaclia =

Scientific classification
- Domain: Eukaryota
- Kingdom: Animalia
- Phylum: Arthropoda
- Class: Insecta
- Order: Lepidoptera
- Superfamily: Noctuoidea
- Family: Erebidae
- Subfamily: Arctiinae
- Genus: Tsirananaclia; Griveaud, 1964

Genus of moths

Tsirananaclia is a genus of moth in the subfamily Arctiinae.

== Species ==
- Tsirananaclia formosa Griveaud, 1973
- Tsirananaclia milloti Griveaud, 1964
- Tsirananaclia sucini Griveaud, 1964
- Tsirananaclia tripunctata Griveaud, 1964
