= Scopula roezaria =

Scientific classification
- Domain: Eukaryota
- Kingdom: Animalia
- Phylum: Arthropoda
- Class: Insecta
- Order: Lepidoptera
- Family: Geometridae
- Genus: Scopula
- Species: S. roezaria

Binomial name
- Scopula roezaria (C. Swinhoe, 1904)

Synonyms
- Emmiltis roezaria C. Swinhoe, 1904

Species of geometer moth in subfamily Sterrhinae

Scopula roezaria is a moth of the family Geometridae first described by Charles Swinhoe in 1904. It is found on Madagascar.

This species has a wingspan of 20 millimetres (0.79 in). Frons and palpi are chestnut red. The top of the head is white with a chestnut band behind. Body and wings are white, a costal line of the forewings is chestnut-red. A dentated grey discal line with black points across both wings, an indistinct submarginal line and black marginal points. The underside of both wings is white the forewings with the red costal line and some red suffusion on the costal space, discal line red and marginal line of both wings red.
