= Scopula leucoloma =

Scientific classification
- Kingdom: Animalia
- Phylum: Arthropoda
- Class: Insecta
- Order: Lepidoptera
- Family: Geometridae
- Genus: Scopula
- Species: S. leucoloma

Binomial name
- Scopula leucoloma Prout, 1932

Species of geometer moth in subfamily Sterrhinae

Scopula leucoloma is a moth of the family Geometridae. It was described by Prout in 1932. It is endemic to Madagascar.

== Subspecies ==
- Scopula leucoloma leucoloma
- Scopula leucoloma altimontana Herbulot, 1972
- Scopula leucoloma permutans Herbulot, 1972
