= Sphyrocosta =

Scientific classification
- Kingdom: Animalia
- Phylum: Arthropoda
- Class: Insecta
- Order: Lepidoptera
- Family: Geometridae
- Subfamily: Ennominae
- Genus: Sphyrocosta; Krüger, 2001

Type species
- Xenostega madecassa Viette, 1973

Genus of moths

Sphyrocosta is a monotypic genus of moth in the family of Geometridae.

There is only one species in this genus: Sphyrocosta madecassa Viette, 1973 from Madagascar.
