= Ethmia befasiella =

Scientific classification
- Kingdom: Animalia
- Phylum: Arthropoda
- Class: Insecta
- Order: Lepidoptera
- Family: Depressariidae
- Genus: Ethmia
- Species: E. befasiella

Binomial name
- Ethmia befasiella Viette, 1958

Species of moth

Ethmia befasiella is a moth in the family Depressariidae. It is found in Madagascar.
