= Lepidokirbyia venigera =

Scientific classification
- Kingdom: Animalia
- Phylum: Arthropoda
- Class: Insecta
- Order: Lepidoptera
- Superfamily: Noctuoidea
- Family: Erebidae
- Subfamily: Arctiinae
- Genus: Lepidokirbyia
- Species: L. venigera

Binomial name
- Lepidokirbyia venigera Toulgoët, 1982

Species of moth

Lepidokirbyia venigera is a moth of the family Erebidae first described by Hervé de Toulgoët in 1982. It is found in French Guiana, Brazil and Mexico.
