= Toulgarctia luteoradians =

Scientific classification
- Kingdom: Animalia
- Phylum: Arthropoda
- Class: Insecta
- Order: Lepidoptera
- Superfamily: Noctuoidea
- Family: Erebidae
- Subfamily: Arctiinae
- Genus: Toulgarctia
- Species: T. luteoradians

Binomial name
- Toulgarctia luteoradians (Toulgoët, 1954)

Synonyms
- Diacrisia luteoradians Toulgoët, 1954; Spilosoma luteoradians; Spilosoma jugicola Toulgoët, 1976; Spilosoma jugicola monochroma Goodger & Watson, 1995; Spilosoma monochroma Toulgoët, 1984; Spilosoma luteoradians monochroma Goodger & Watson, 1995; Estigmene madagascariensis Rothschild, 1933 (preocc. Butler, 1882)

Species of moth

Toulgarctia luteoradians is a moth in the family Erebidae. It was described by Hervé de Toulgoët in 1954. It is found on Madagascar.

== Subspecies ==
- Toulgarctia luteoradians luteoradians
- Toulgarctia luteoradians jugicola (Toulgoët, 1976)
- Toulgarctia luteoradians monochroma (Toulgoët, 1984)
