= Pseudopharus gibeauxi =

Scientific classification
- Kingdom: Animalia
- Phylum: Arthropoda
- Class: Insecta
- Order: Lepidoptera
- Superfamily: Noctuoidea
- Family: Erebidae
- Subfamily: Arctiinae
- Genus: Pseudopharus
- Species: P. gibeauxi

Binomial name
- Pseudopharus gibeauxi Toulgoët, 1990

Species of moth

Pseudopharus gibeauxi is a moth in the family Erebidae first described by Hervé de Toulgoët in 1990. It is found in Venezuela.
