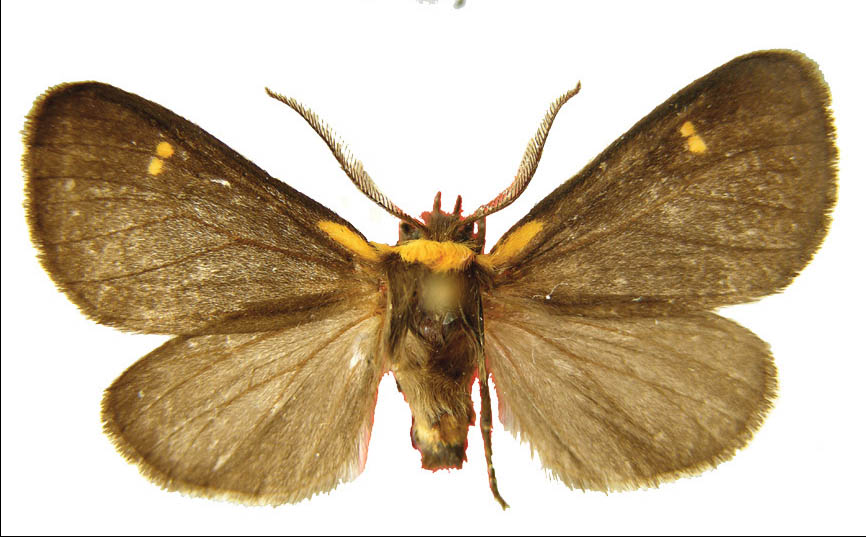
- Venedictoffia flavicollis

Scientific classification
- Kingdom: Animalia
- Phylum: Arthropoda
- Clade: Pancrustacea
- Class: Insecta
- Order: Lepidoptera
- Superfamily: Noctuoidea
- Family: Erebidae
- Subfamily: Arctiinae
- Genus: Venedictoffia
- Species: V. flavicollis

Binomial name
- Venedictoffia flavicollis Toulgoët, 1977

= Venedictoffia flavicollis =

Species of moth

Venedictoffia flavicollis is a moth in the subfamily Arctiinae. It was described by Hervé de Toulgoët in 1977. It is found in Ecuador.
