= Proxhyle vadoni =

Scientific classification
- Kingdom: Animalia
- Phylum: Arthropoda
- Class: Insecta
- Order: Lepidoptera
- Superfamily: Noctuoidea
- Family: Erebidae
- Subfamily: Arctiinae
- Genus: Proxhyle
- Species: P. vadoni

Binomial name
- Proxhyle vadoni (Toulgoët, 1953)

Synonyms
- Asura vadoni Toulgoët, 1953

Species of moth

Proxhyle vadoni is a moth in the family Erebidae. It was described by Hervé de Toulgoët in 1953. It is found on Madagascar.
