= Spatulosia malgassica =

Scientific classification
- Kingdom: Animalia
- Phylum: Arthropoda
- Class: Insecta
- Order: Lepidoptera
- Superfamily: Noctuoidea
- Family: Erebidae
- Subfamily: Arctiinae
- Genus: Spatulosia
- Species: S. malgassica

Binomial name
- Spatulosia malgassica Toulgoët, 1965

Species of moth

Spatulosia malgassica is a moth in the subfamily Arctiinae. It was described by Hervé de Toulgoët in 1965 and is found in Madagascar.
