= Spatulosia griveaudi =

Scientific classification
- Kingdom: Animalia
- Phylum: Arthropoda
- Class: Insecta
- Order: Lepidoptera
- Superfamily: Noctuoidea
- Family: Erebidae
- Subfamily: Arctiinae
- Genus: Spatulosia
- Species: S. griveaudi

Binomial name
- Spatulosia griveaudi Toulgoët, 1972

Species of moth

Spatulosia griveaudi is a moth in the subfamily Arctiinae. It was described by Hervé de Toulgoët in 1972. It is found on the Comoros.
