= Parexilisia bipunctoides =

Scientific classification
- Kingdom: Animalia
- Phylum: Arthropoda
- Clade: Pancrustacea
- Class: Insecta
- Order: Lepidoptera
- Superfamily: Noctuoidea
- Family: Erebidae
- Subfamily: Arctiinae
- Genus: Parexilisia
- Species: P. bipunctoides

Binomial name
- Parexilisia bipunctoides (Toulgoët, 1953)

Synonyms
- Philenora bipunctoides Toulgoët, 1953

Species of moth

Parexilisia bipunctoides is a moth of the subfamily Arctiinae. It was described by Hervé de Toulgoët in 1953. It is found on Madagascar.
