= Praemastus albicinctus =

Scientific classification
- Kingdom: Animalia
- Phylum: Arthropoda
- Class: Insecta
- Order: Lepidoptera
- Superfamily: Noctuoidea
- Family: Erebidae
- Subfamily: Arctiinae
- Genus: Praemastus
- Species: P. albicinctus

Binomial name
- Praemastus albicinctus (Toulgoët, 1990)

Synonyms
- Amastus albicinctus Toulgoët, 1990

Species of moth

Praemastus albicinctus is a moth in the subfamily Arctiinae. It was described by Hervé de Toulgoët in 1990. It is found in Costa Rica.
