= Toulgarctia milloti =

Scientific classification
- Kingdom: Animalia
- Phylum: Arthropoda
- Class: Insecta
- Order: Lepidoptera
- Superfamily: Noctuoidea
- Family: Erebidae
- Subfamily: Arctiinae
- Genus: Toulgarctia
- Species: T. milloti

Binomial name
- Toulgarctia milloti (Toulgoët, 1954)

Synonyms
- Diacrisia milloti Toulgoët, 1954; Spilosoma milloti

Species of moth

Toulgarctia milloti is a moth in the family Erebidae. It was described by Hervé de Toulgoët in 1954. It is found on Madagascar.
