= Hypomolis thiaucourti =

Scientific classification
- Kingdom: Animalia
- Phylum: Arthropoda
- Class: Insecta
- Order: Lepidoptera
- Superfamily: Noctuoidea
- Family: Erebidae
- Subfamily: Arctiinae
- Genus: Hypomolis
- Species: H. thiaucourti

Binomial name
- Hypomolis thiaucourti Toulgoët, 1977

Species of moth

Hypomolis thiaucourti is a moth of the family Erebidae. It was described by Hervé de Toulgoët in 1977. It is found in Ecuador.
