= Astralarctia venatorum =

Scientific classification
- Kingdom: Animalia
- Phylum: Arthropoda
- Class: Insecta
- Order: Lepidoptera
- Superfamily: Noctuoidea
- Family: Erebidae
- Subfamily: Arctiinae
- Genus: Astralarctia
- Species: A. venatorum

Binomial name
- Astralarctia venatorum Toulgoët, 1991

Species of moth

Astralarctia venatorum is a moth of the family Erebidae first described by Hervé de Toulgoët in 1991. It is found in Ecuador.
