= Parexilisia simulator =

Scientific classification
- Kingdom: Animalia
- Phylum: Arthropoda
- Class: Insecta
- Order: Lepidoptera
- Superfamily: Noctuoidea
- Family: Erebidae
- Subfamily: Arctiinae
- Genus: Parexilisia
- Species: P. simulator

Binomial name
- Parexilisia simulator Toulgoët, 1958

Species of moth

Parexilisia simulator is a moth of the subfamily Arctiinae. It was described by Hervé de Toulgoët in 1958. It is found on Madagascar.
