= Aldaba =

Aldaba may refer to:

- Hypomolis aldaba, a moth of the family Erebidae
- Estefania Aldaba-Lim (1917–2006), psychologist and secretary of the Philippine Department of Social Services and Development
- Herminio Aldaba Astorga (1929–2004), Filipino politician
