= Regobarrosia villiersi =

Scientific classification
- Kingdom: Animalia
- Phylum: Arthropoda
- Clade: Pancrustacea
- Class: Insecta
- Order: Lepidoptera
- Superfamily: Noctuoidea
- Family: Erebidae
- Subfamily: Arctiinae
- Genus: Regobarrosia
- Species: R. villiersi

Binomial name
- Regobarrosia villiersi Toulgoët, 1984

Species of moth

Regobarrosia villiersi is a moth in the family Erebidae. It was described by Hervé de Toulgoët in 1984. It is found in French Guiana.
