= Venedictoffia karsholti =

Scientific classification
- Kingdom: Animalia
- Phylum: Arthropoda
- Class: Insecta
- Order: Lepidoptera
- Superfamily: Noctuoidea
- Family: Erebidae
- Subfamily: Arctiinae
- Genus: Venedictoffia
- Species: V. karsholti

Binomial name
- Venedictoffia karsholti (Toulgoët, 1991)

Synonyms
- Phragmatobia karsholti Toulgoët, 1991

Species of moth

Venedictoffia karsholti is a species of moth of the subfamily Arctiinae first described by Hervé de Toulgoët in 1991. It is found in Peru.
