= Hypomolis agnes =

Scientific classification
- Kingdom: Animalia
- Phylum: Arthropoda
- Class: Insecta
- Order: Lepidoptera
- Superfamily: Noctuoidea
- Family: Erebidae
- Subfamily: Arctiinae
- Genus: Hypomolis
- Species: H. agnes

Binomial name
- Hypomolis agnes Toulgoët, 1982

Species of moth

Hypomolis agnes is a moth of the family Erebidae. It was described by Hervé de Toulgoët in 1982. It is found in Peru.
