= Proxhyle cinerascens =

Scientific classification
- Kingdom: Animalia
- Phylum: Arthropoda
- Class: Insecta
- Order: Lepidoptera
- Superfamily: Noctuoidea
- Family: Erebidae
- Subfamily: Arctiinae
- Genus: Proxhyle
- Species: P. cinerascens

Binomial name
- Proxhyle cinerascens Toulgoët, 1959

Species of moth

Proxhyle cinerascens is a moth in the family Erebidae. It was described by Hervé de Toulgoët in 1959.

It is found in Andasibe, Madagascar. This species has a wingspan of 14–15 mm, strongly bipectinated antennae in the male. The forewings are greyish with blackish spots, hindwings yellowish orange, bordered broadly with brown.
