= Coiffaitarctia groisonae =

Scientific classification
- Kingdom: Animalia
- Phylum: Arthropoda
- Class: Insecta
- Order: Lepidoptera
- Superfamily: Noctuoidea
- Family: Erebidae
- Subfamily: Arctiinae
- Genus: Coiffaitarctia
- Species: C. groisonae

Binomial name
- Coiffaitarctia groisonae Toulgoët, 1991

Species of moth

Coiffaitarctia groisonae is a moth of the family Erebidae first described by Hervé de Toulgoët in 1991. It is found in French Guiana.
