= Parexilisia indecisa =

Scientific classification
- Kingdom: Animalia
- Phylum: Arthropoda
- Class: Insecta
- Order: Lepidoptera
- Superfamily: Noctuoidea
- Family: Erebidae
- Subfamily: Arctiinae
- Genus: Parexilisia
- Species: P. indecisa

Binomial name
- Parexilisia indecisa (Toulgoët, 1956)

Synonyms
- Philenora indecisa Toulgoët, 1956

Species of moth

Parexilisia indecisa is a moth of the subfamily Arctiinae. It was described by Hervé de Toulgoët in 1956. It is found on Madagascar.
