= Watsonidia navatteae =

Scientific classification
- Kingdom: Animalia
- Phylum: Arthropoda
- Class: Insecta
- Order: Lepidoptera
- Superfamily: Noctuoidea
- Family: Erebidae
- Subfamily: Arctiinae
- Genus: Watsonidia
- Species: W. navatteae

Binomial name
- Watsonidia navatteae Toulgoët, 1986

Species of moth

Watsonidia navatteae is a moth in the family Erebidae. It was described by Hervé de Toulgoët in 1986 and is found in Bolivia.
