= Scoparia pusillula =

Scientific classification
- Kingdom: Animalia
- Phylum: Arthropoda
- Class: Insecta
- Order: Lepidoptera
- Family: Crambidae
- Genus: Scoparia
- Species: S. pusillula

Binomial name
- Scoparia pusillula Munroe, 1995

Synonyms
- Scoparia pusilla Dyar, 1914 (preocc.)

Species of moth

Scoparia pusillula is a moth in the family Crambidae. It was described by Eugene G. Munroe in 1995 and is found in Panama, where it is common on the Atlantic side of the country.

Adults are small and narrow winged, with a pattern similar to that of Toulgoetodes tersella.
