= Gorgonidia vulcania =

Scientific classification
- Kingdom: Animalia
- Phylum: Arthropoda
- Class: Insecta
- Order: Lepidoptera
- Superfamily: Noctuoidea
- Family: Erebidae
- Subfamily: Arctiinae
- Genus: Gorgonidia
- Species: G. vulcania

Binomial name
- Gorgonidia vulcania Toulgoët, 1987

Species of moth

Gorgonidia vulcania is a moth of the family Erebidae first described by Hervé de Toulgoët in 1987. It is found in French Guiana and Suriname.
