= Isorropus lateritea =

Scientific classification
- Kingdom: Animalia
- Phylum: Arthropoda
- Class: Insecta
- Order: Lepidoptera
- Superfamily: Noctuoidea
- Family: Erebidae
- Subfamily: Arctiinae
- Genus: Isorropus
- Species: I. lateritea

Binomial name
- Isorropus lateritea Toulgoët, 1957

Species of moth

Isorropus lateritea is a moth of the subfamily Arctiinae. It was described by Hervé de Toulgoët in 1957. It is found on Madagascar.
