= Proxhyle comoreana =

Scientific classification
- Kingdom: Animalia
- Phylum: Arthropoda
- Class: Insecta
- Order: Lepidoptera
- Superfamily: Noctuoidea
- Family: Erebidae
- Subfamily: Arctiinae
- Genus: Proxhyle
- Species: P. comoreana

Binomial name
- Proxhyle comoreana Toulgoët, 1959

Species of moth

Proxhyle comoreana is a moth in the subfamily Arctiinae. It was described by Hervé de Toulgoët in 1959. It is found on Mayotte in the Indian Ocean off the coast of southeast Africa.
