= Hyalarctia bertrandi =

Scientific classification
- Kingdom: Animalia
- Phylum: Arthropoda
- Class: Insecta
- Order: Lepidoptera
- Superfamily: Noctuoidea
- Family: Erebidae
- Subfamily: Arctiinae
- Genus: Hyalarctia
- Species: H. bertrandi

Binomial name
- Hyalarctia bertrandi Toulgoët, 2000

Species of moth

Hyalarctia bertrandi is a moth of the family Erebidae first described by Hervé de Toulgoët in 2000. It is found in Brazil.
