= Watsonidia porioni =

Scientific classification
- Kingdom: Animalia
- Phylum: Arthropoda
- Clade: Pancrustacea
- Class: Insecta
- Order: Lepidoptera
- Superfamily: Noctuoidea
- Family: Erebidae
- Subfamily: Arctiinae
- Genus: Watsonidia
- Species: W. porioni

Binomial name
- Watsonidia porioni Toulgoët, 1981

Species of moth

Watsonidia porioni is a moth in the family Erebidae first described by Hervé de Toulgoët in 1981. It is found in Panama.
