= Astacosia lineata =

Scientific classification
- Kingdom: Animalia
- Phylum: Arthropoda
- Class: Insecta
- Order: Lepidoptera
- Superfamily: Noctuoidea
- Family: Erebidae
- Subfamily: Arctiinae
- Genus: Astacosia
- Species: A. lineata

Binomial name
- Astacosia lineata Toulgoët, 1965

Species of moth

Astacosia lineata is a species of moth in the subfamily Arctiinae of the family Erebidae. It was described by Hervé de Toulgoët in 1965.

The species is endemic to Madagascar.

== Distribution ==
Astacosia lineata is recorded from Madagascar, where it appears to be restricted to the island’s endemic fauna.

== Taxonomy ==
The species was first described in 1965 by the French entomologist Hervé de Toulgoët.
