= Kiriakoffalia lemairei =

Scientific classification
- Kingdom: Animalia
- Phylum: Arthropoda
- Class: Insecta
- Order: Lepidoptera
- Superfamily: Noctuoidea
- Family: Erebidae
- Subfamily: Arctiinae
- Genus: Kiriakoffalia
- Species: K. lemairei

Binomial name
- Kiriakoffalia lemairei (Toulgoët, 1976)

Synonyms
- Pericallia lemeirei Toulgoët, 1976; Kiriakoffia lemairei paleacea Toulgoët, 1978

Species of moth

Kiriakoffalia lemairei is a moth of the family Erebidae. It was described by Hervé de Toulgoët in 1976. It is found in Cameroon, the Democratic Republic of the Congo and Gabon.

== Subspecies ==
- Kiriakoffalia lemairei lemairei (Cameroon)
- Kiriakoffalia lemairei paleacea (Toulgoët, 1978) (Cameroon, the Democratic Republic of the Congo, Gabon)
