= Dipaenae zygaenoides =

Scientific classification
- Kingdom: Animalia
- Phylum: Arthropoda
- Class: Insecta
- Order: Lepidoptera
- Superfamily: Noctuoidea
- Family: Erebidae
- Subfamily: Arctiinae
- Genus: Dipaenae
- Species: D. zygaenoides

Binomial name
- Dipaenae zygaenoides (Toulgoët, 1983)

Synonyms
- Dipaena zygaenoides Toulgoët, 1983

Species of moth

Dipaenae zygaenoides is a moth of the subfamily Arctiinae first described by Hervé de Toulgoët in 1983. It is found in French Guiana.
