= Spatulosia legrandi =

Scientific classification
- Kingdom: Animalia
- Phylum: Arthropoda
- Class: Insecta
- Order: Lepidoptera
- Superfamily: Noctuoidea
- Family: Erebidae
- Subfamily: Arctiinae
- Genus: Spatulosia
- Species: S. legrandi

Binomial name
- Spatulosia legrandi Toulgoët, 1965

Species of moth

Spatulosia legrandi is a moth in the subfamily Arctiinae. It was described by Hervé de Toulgoët in 1965. It is found on Madagascar and the Seychelles.
