= Astacosia oblonga =

Scientific classification
- Kingdom: Animalia
- Phylum: Arthropoda
- Class: Insecta
- Order: Lepidoptera
- Superfamily: Noctuoidea
- Family: Erebidae
- Subfamily: Arctiinae
- Genus: Astacosia
- Species: A. oblonga

Binomial name
- Astacosia oblonga (Toulgoët, 1955)

Synonyms
- Philenora oblonga Toulgoët, 1955

Species of moth

Astacosia oblonga is a moth of the subfamily Arctiinae. It was described by Hervé de Toulgoët in 1955. It is found on Madagascar.
