= Toulgarctia viettei =

Scientific classification
- Kingdom: Animalia
- Phylum: Arthropoda
- Class: Insecta
- Order: Lepidoptera
- Superfamily: Noctuoidea
- Family: Erebidae
- Subfamily: Arctiinae
- Genus: Toulgarctia
- Species: T. viettei

Binomial name
- Toulgarctia viettei (Toulgoët, 1954)

Synonyms
- Diacrisia viettei Toulgoët, 1954; Spilosoma viettei

Species of moth

Toulgarctia viettei is a moth in the family Erebidae. It was described by Hervé de Toulgoët in 1954. It is found on Madagascar.
