= Toulgarctia vieui =

Scientific classification
- Kingdom: Animalia
- Phylum: Arthropoda
- Class: Insecta
- Order: Lepidoptera
- Superfamily: Noctuoidea
- Family: Erebidae
- Subfamily: Arctiinae
- Genus: Toulgarctia
- Species: T. vieui

Binomial name
- Toulgarctia vieui (Toulgoët, 1957)

Synonyms
- Spilarctia vieui Toulgoët, 1957; Spilosoma vieui

Species of moth

Toulgarctia vieui is a moth in the family Erebidae. It was described by Hervé de Toulgoët in 1957. It is found on Madagascar.
