= Astralarctia =

Scientific classification
- Domain: Eukaryota
- Kingdom: Animalia
- Phylum: Arthropoda
- Class: Insecta
- Order: Lepidoptera
- Superfamily: Noctuoidea
- Family: Erebidae
- Subfamily: Arctiinae
- Subtribe: Phaegopterina
- Genus: Astralarctia; Watson, 1975

Genus of moths

Astralarctia is a genus of moths in the family Erebidae.

== Species ==
- Astralarctia canalis
- Astralarctia pulverosa
- Astralarctia venatorum
