= Isorropus sanguinolenta =

Scientific classification
- Domain: Eukaryota
- Kingdom: Animalia
- Phylum: Arthropoda
- Class: Insecta
- Order: Lepidoptera
- Superfamily: Noctuoidea
- Family: Erebidae
- Subfamily: Arctiinae
- Genus: Isorropus
- Species: I. sanguinolenta

Binomial name
- Isorropus sanguinolenta (Mabille, 1878)

Synonyms
- Lithosia sanguinolenta Mabille, 1879

Species of moth

Isorropus sanguinolenta is a moth of the subfamily Arctiinae. It was described by Paul Mabille in 1878. It is found on Madagascar.
