= Hypomolis sanguinipectus =

Scientific classification
- Kingdom: Animalia
- Phylum: Arthropoda
- Class: Insecta
- Order: Lepidoptera
- Superfamily: Noctuoidea
- Family: Erebidae
- Subfamily: Arctiinae
- Genus: Hypomolis
- Species: H. sanguinipectus

Binomial name
- Hypomolis sanguinipectus Seitz, 1919

Synonyms
- Turuptiana sanguinipectus Seitz, 1919

Species of moth

Hypomolis sanguinipectus is a moth of the family Erebidae. It was described by Adalbert Seitz in 1919. It is found in Colombia and Peru.

== Subspecies ==
- Hypomolis sanguinipectus sanguinipectus (Colombia)
- Hypomolis sanguinipectus peruvianus Toulgoët, 1982 (Peru)
