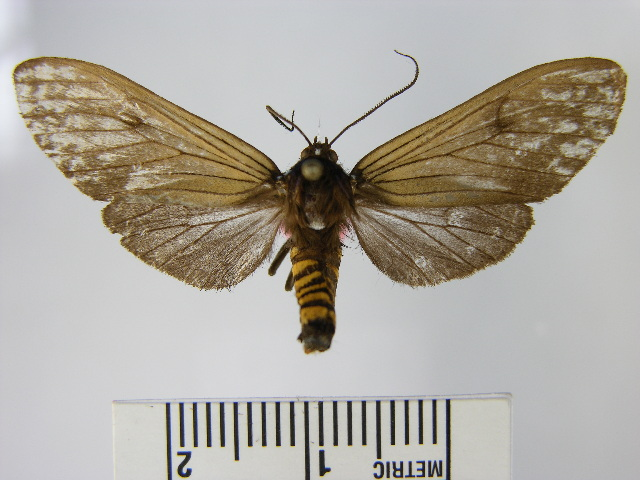

Scientific classification
- Domain: Eukaryota
- Kingdom: Animalia
- Phylum: Arthropoda
- Class: Insecta
- Order: Lepidoptera
- Superfamily: Noctuoidea
- Family: Erebidae
- Subfamily: Arctiinae
- Genus: Pseudopharus
- Species: P. hades

Binomial name
- Pseudopharus hades Dognin, 1909

= Pseudopharus hades =

Species of moth

Pseudopharus hades is a moth in the family Erebidae first described by Paul Dognin in 1909. It is found in Colombia.
