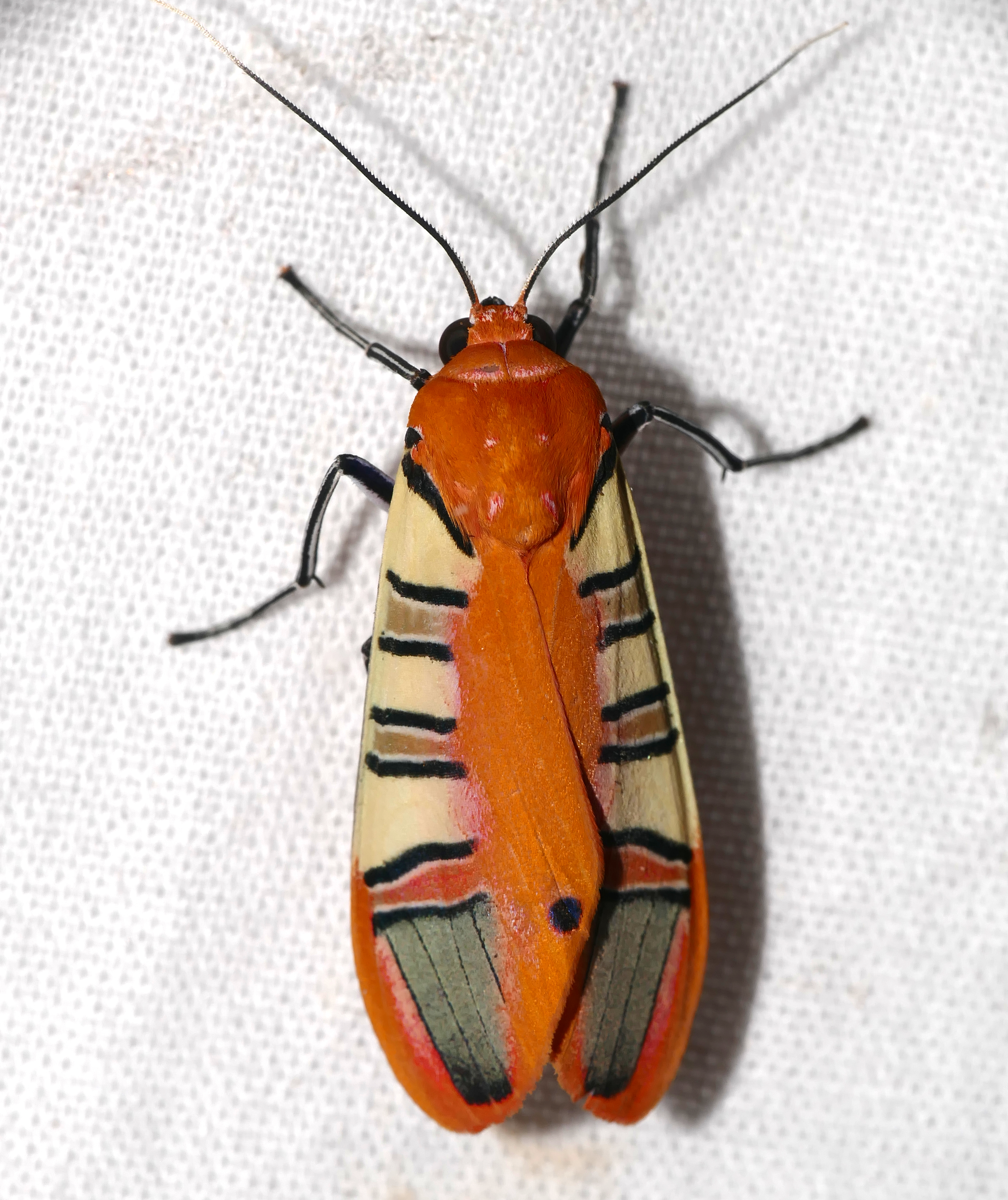

Scientific classification
- Domain: Eukaryota
- Kingdom: Animalia
- Phylum: Arthropoda
- Class: Insecta
- Order: Lepidoptera
- Superfamily: Noctuoidea
- Family: Erebidae
- Subfamily: Arctiinae
- Genus: Gorgonidia
- Species: G. withfordi

Binomial name
- Gorgonidia withfordi (Rothschild, 1910)

Synonyms
- Automolis buckleyi whitfordi Rothschild, 1910

= Gorgonidia withfordi =

Species of moth

Gorgonidia withfordi is a moth of the family Erebidae first described by Walter Rothschild in 1910. It is found in Brazil, French Guiana, Guyana, Ecuador, Peru, Bolivia and Honduras.
