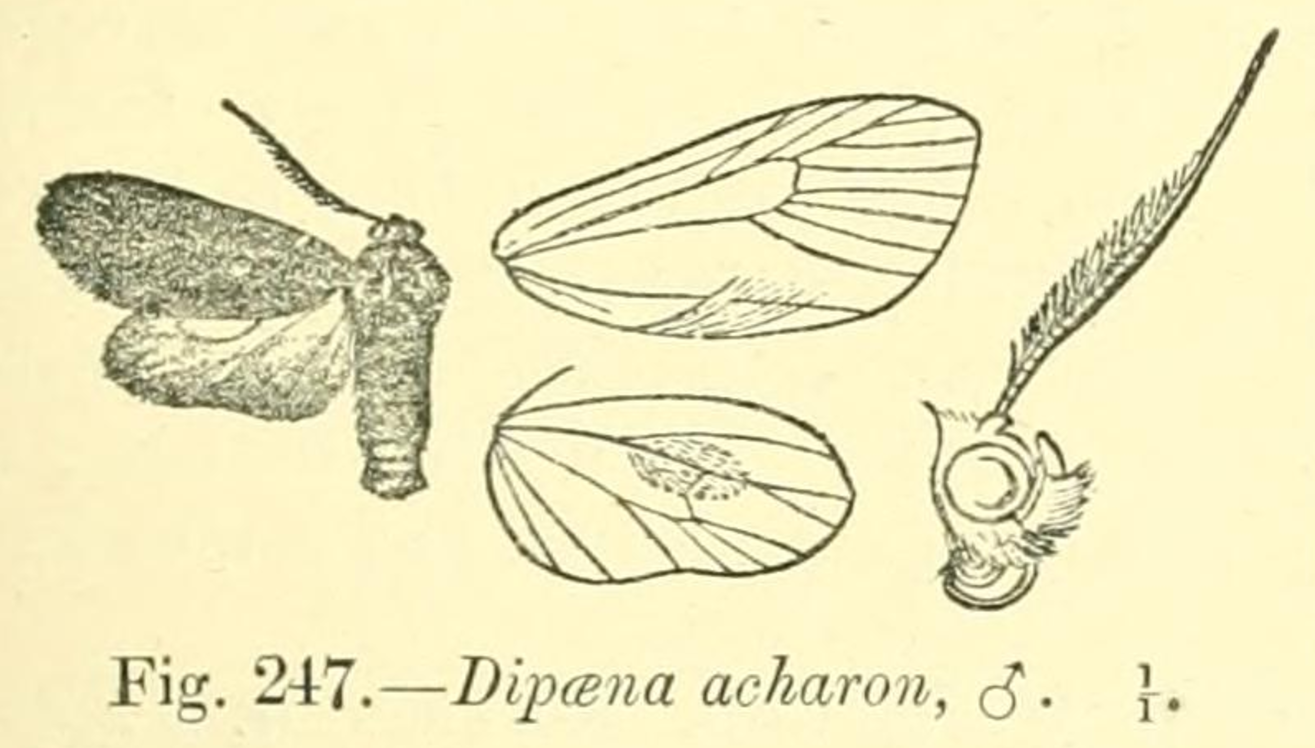

Scientific classification
- Kingdom: Animalia
- Phylum: Arthropoda
- Class: Insecta
- Order: Lepidoptera
- Superfamily: Noctuoidea
- Family: Erebidae
- Subfamily: Arctiinae
- Genus: Dipaenae
- Species: D. ferruginosa

Binomial name
- Dipaenae ferruginosa (Walker, 1854)

Synonyms
- Euchromia ferruginosa Walker, 1854; Anycles rhodura Butler, 1876; Dipaenae acheron Hampson, 1900

= Dipaenae ferruginosa =

Species of moth

Dipaenae ferruginosa is a moth of the subfamily Arctiinae first described by Francis Walker in 1854. It is found in the Amazon region.
