= Hypomolis lymphasea =

Scientific classification
- Kingdom: Animalia
- Phylum: Arthropoda
- Class: Insecta
- Order: Lepidoptera
- Superfamily: Noctuoidea
- Family: Erebidae
- Subfamily: Arctiinae
- Genus: Hypomolis
- Species: H. lymphasea

Binomial name
- Hypomolis lymphasea Dognin, 1892

Synonyms
- Phragmatobia lymphasea Dognin, 1892; Diacrisia lymphasea

Species of moth

Hypomolis lymphasea is a moth of the family Erebidae. It was described by Paul Dognin in 1892. It is found in Ecuador.
