= Watsonidia pardea =

Scientific classification
- Domain: Eukaryota
- Kingdom: Animalia
- Phylum: Arthropoda
- Class: Insecta
- Order: Lepidoptera
- Superfamily: Noctuoidea
- Family: Erebidae
- Subfamily: Arctiinae
- Genus: Watsonidia
- Species: W. pardea

Binomial name
- Watsonidia pardea (Schaus, 1933)

Synonyms
- Glaucostola pardea Schaus, 1933

Species of moth

Watsonidia pardea is a moth in the family Erebidae first described by William Schaus in 1933. It is found in Colombia.
