= Hypomolis virescens =

Scientific classification
- Kingdom: Animalia
- Phylum: Arthropoda
- Class: Insecta
- Order: Lepidoptera
- Superfamily: Noctuoidea
- Family: Erebidae
- Subfamily: Arctiinae
- Genus: Hypomolis
- Species: H. virescens

Binomial name
- Hypomolis virescens (Rothschild, 1909)

Synonyms
- Automolis virescens Rothschild, 1909

Species of moth

Hypomolis virescens is a moth of the family Erebidae. It was described by Walter Rothschild in 1909. It is found in Peru.
