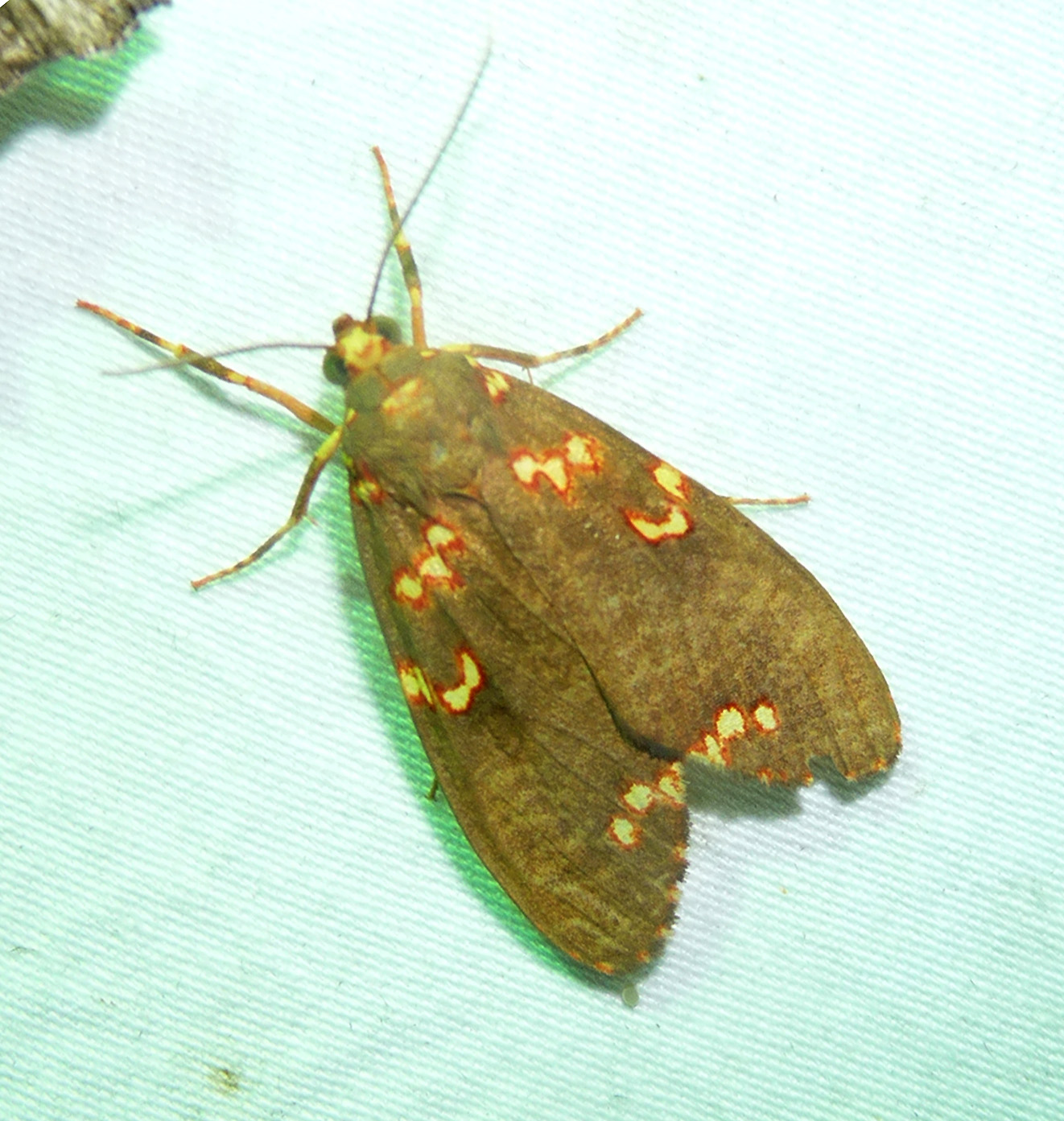

Scientific classification
- Kingdom: Animalia
- Phylum: Arthropoda
- Class: Insecta
- Order: Lepidoptera
- Superfamily: Noctuoidea
- Family: Erebidae
- Subfamily: Arctiinae
- Genus: Coiffaitarctia
- Species: C. steniptera

Binomial name
- Coiffaitarctia steniptera (Hampson, 1905)

Synonyms
- Neritos steniptera Hampson, 1905; Araeomolis basalis Rothschild, 1909

= Coiffaitarctia steniptera =

Species of moth

Coiffaitarctia steniptera is a moth of the family Erebidae first described by George Hampson in 1905. It is found in Costa Rica, French Guiana, Suriname and the Amazon region.
