= Gorgonidia garleppi =

Scientific classification
- Domain: Eukaryota
- Kingdom: Animalia
- Phylum: Arthropoda
- Class: Insecta
- Order: Lepidoptera
- Superfamily: Noctuoidea
- Family: Erebidae
- Subfamily: Arctiinae
- Genus: Gorgonidia
- Species: G. garleppi

Binomial name
- Gorgonidia garleppi (H. Druce, 1898)

Synonyms
- Zatrephes garleppi H. Druce, 1898; Gorgonidia mirabilior Dyar, 1898; Automolis garleppi pallidipennis Rothschild, 1910; Gorgonidia garleppi f. martinezi Toulgoët, 1988

Species of moth

Gorgonidia garleppi is a moth of the family Erebidae first described by Herbert Druce in 1898. It is found in Bolivia and Peru.
