= Hyalarctia tepica =

Scientific classification
- Domain: Eukaryota
- Kingdom: Animalia
- Phylum: Arthropoda
- Class: Insecta
- Order: Lepidoptera
- Superfamily: Noctuoidea
- Family: Erebidae
- Subfamily: Arctiinae
- Genus: Hyalarctia
- Species: H. tepica

Binomial name
- Hyalarctia tepica Dyar, 1914

Species of moth

Hyalarctia tepica is a moth of the family Erebidae first described by Harrison Gray Dyar Jr. in 1914. It is found in Mexico.
