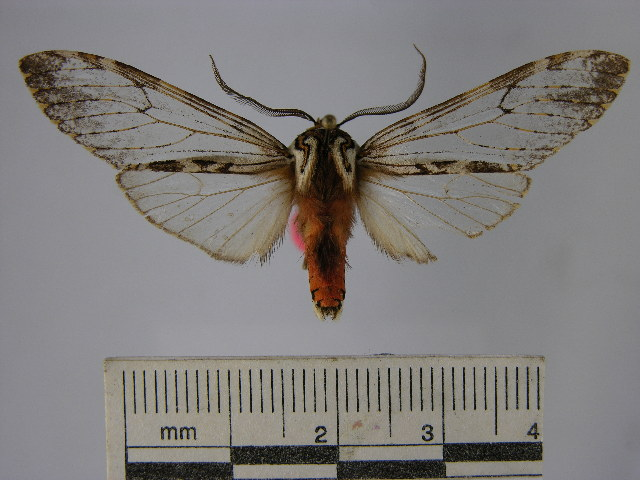

Scientific classification
- Kingdom: Animalia
- Phylum: Arthropoda
- Class: Insecta
- Order: Lepidoptera
- Superfamily: Noctuoidea
- Family: Erebidae
- Subfamily: Arctiinae
- Genus: Praemastus
- Species: P. fulvizonata

Binomial name
- Praemastus fulvizonata (Hampson, 1909)

Synonyms
- Amastus fulvizonata Hampson, 1909; Hemihyalea fulvizonata; Pseudohemihyalea fulvizonata

= Praemastus fulvizonata =

Species of moth

Praemastus fulvizonata is a moth in the subfamily Arctiinae. It was described by George Hampson in 1909. It is found in Peru.
