= Microhyle fadella =

Scientific classification
- Domain: Eukaryota
- Kingdom: Animalia
- Phylum: Arthropoda
- Class: Insecta
- Order: Lepidoptera
- Superfamily: Noctuoidea
- Family: Erebidae
- Subfamily: Arctiinae
- Genus: Microhyle
- Species: M. fadella

Binomial name
- Microhyle fadella (Mabille, 1882)

Synonyms
- Hylemera fadella Mabille, 1882

Species of moth

Microhyle fadella is a moth of the subfamily Arctiinae. It was described by Paul Mabille in 1882. It is found on Madagascar.
