= Kiriakoffalia guineae =

Scientific classification
- Domain: Eukaryota
- Kingdom: Animalia
- Phylum: Arthropoda
- Class: Insecta
- Order: Lepidoptera
- Superfamily: Noctuoidea
- Family: Erebidae
- Subfamily: Arctiinae
- Genus: Kiriakoffalia
- Species: K. guineae

Binomial name
- Kiriakoffalia guineae (Strand, 1912)

Synonyms
- Acantharctia guineae Strand, 1912

Species of moth

Kiriakoffalia guineae is a moth of the family Erebidae. It was described by Strand in 1912. It is found in Equatorial Guinea and Gabon.
