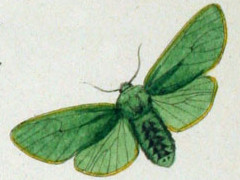

Scientific classification
- Kingdom: Animalia
- Phylum: Arthropoda
- Class: Insecta
- Order: Lepidoptera
- Superfamily: Noctuoidea
- Family: Erebidae
- Subfamily: Arctiinae
- Genus: Hypomolis
- Species: H. aeruginosa

Binomial name
- Hypomolis aeruginosa (Felder & Rogenhofer, 1874)

Synonyms
- Arctia aeruginosa Felder, 1874; Diacrisia aeruginosa

= Hypomolis aeruginosa =

Species of moth

Hypomolis aeruginosa is a moth of the family Erebidae. It was described by Felder and Rogenhofer in 1874. It is found in Colombia and Peru.

== Subspecies ==
- Hypomolis aeruginosa aeruginosa (Colombia)
- Hypomolis aeruginosa roseiventris Toulgoët, 1982 (Peru)
