= Dipaenae moesta =

Scientific classification
- Kingdom: Animalia
- Phylum: Arthropoda
- Class: Insecta
- Order: Lepidoptera
- Superfamily: Noctuoidea
- Family: Erebidae
- Subfamily: Arctiinae
- Genus: Dipaenae
- Species: D. moesta

Binomial name
- Dipaenae moesta (Walker, 1854)

Synonyms
- Euchromia moesta Walker, 1854

Species of moth

Dipaenae moesta is a moth of the subfamily Arctiinae.
