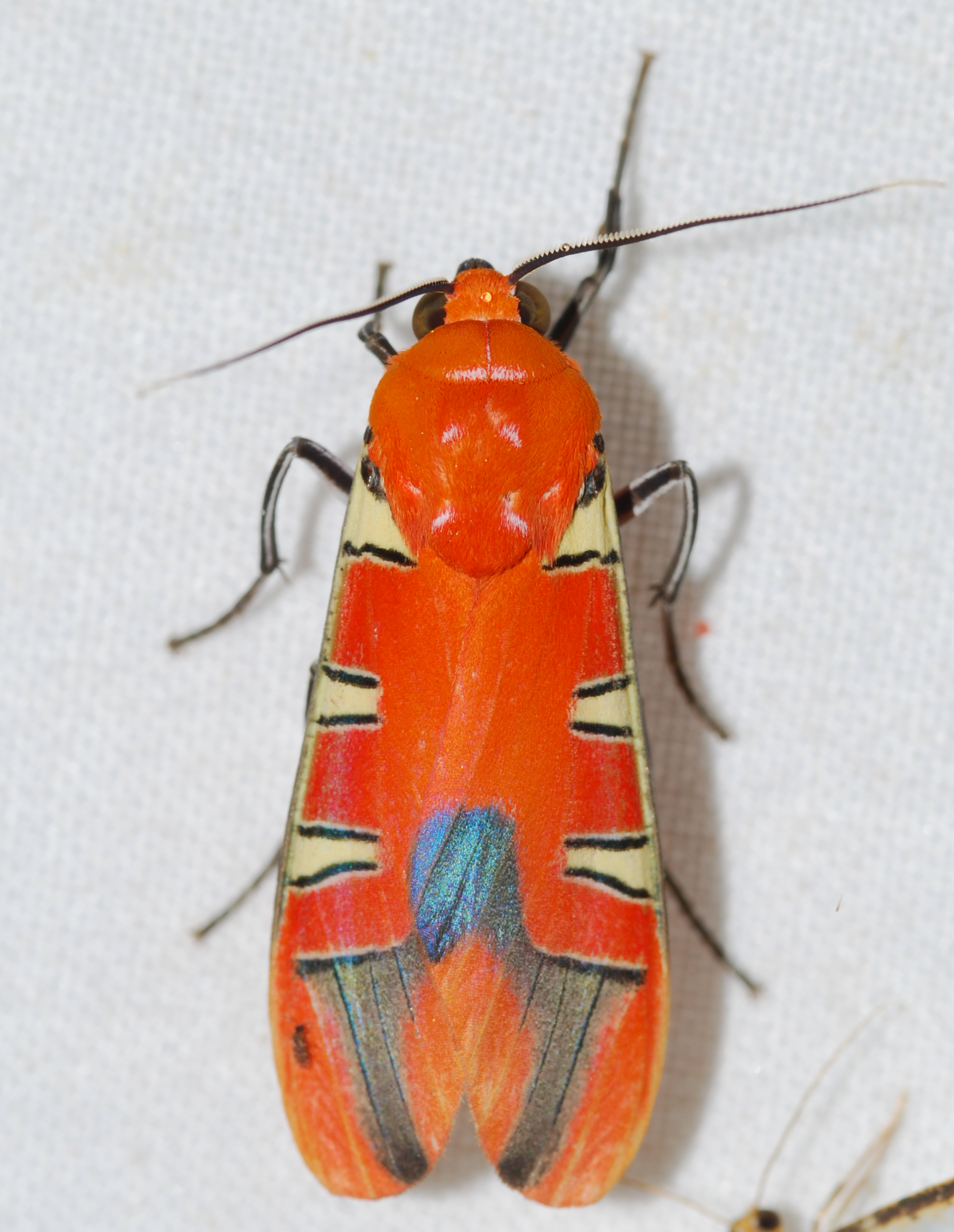

Scientific classification
- Domain: Eukaryota
- Kingdom: Animalia
- Phylum: Arthropoda
- Class: Insecta
- Order: Lepidoptera
- Superfamily: Noctuoidea
- Family: Erebidae
- Subfamily: Arctiinae
- Genus: Gorgonidia
- Species: G. maronensis

Binomial name
- Gorgonidia maronensis (Rothschild, 1917)

Synonyms
- Automolis garleppi maronensis Rothschild, 1910

= Gorgonidia maronensis =

Species of moth

Gorgonidia maronensis is a moth of the family Erebidae first described by Walter Rothschild in 1917. It is found in French Guiana, Ecuador, Peru and Bolivia.
