= Pseudogaltara =

Scientific classification
- Kingdom: Animalia
- Phylum: Arthropoda
- Class: Insecta
- Order: Lepidoptera
- Superfamily: Noctuoidea
- Family: Erebidae
- Subfamily: Arctiinae
- Genus: Pseudogaltara; Toulgoët, 1978
- Species: P. inexpectata

Binomial name
- Pseudogaltara inexpectata Toulgoët, 1978

Genus of moths

Pseudogaltara is a monotypic tiger moth genus in the family Erebidae. Its only species, Pseudogaltara inexpectata, can be found in Rwanda. Both the genus and species were first described by Hervé de Toulgoët in 1978.
