= Agaltara =

Scientific classification
- Kingdom: Animalia
- Phylum: Arthropoda
- Class: Insecta
- Order: Lepidoptera
- Superfamily: Noctuoidea
- Family: Erebidae
- Subfamily: Arctiinae
- Genus: Agaltara; Toulgoët, 1979
- Species: A. nebulosa

Binomial name
- Agaltara nebulosa Toulgoët, 1979

Genus of moths

Agaltara is a genus of tiger moths in the family Erebidae. It contains the single species Agaltara nebulosa, which is found in Malawi and Rwanda. Both the genus and species were first described by Hervé de Toulgoët in 1979.
