= Spatulosia =

Scientific classification
- Kingdom: Animalia
- Phylum: Arthropoda
- Class: Insecta
- Order: Lepidoptera
- Superfamily: Noctuoidea
- Family: Erebidae
- Subfamily: Arctiinae
- Tribe: Lithosiini
- Genus: Spatulosia; Toulgoët, 1966

Genus of moths

Spatulosia is a genus of moths in the subfamily Arctiinae. The genus was erected by Hervé de Toulgoët in 1966.

== Species ==
- Spatulosia griveaudi Toulgoët, 1972
- Spatulosia legrandi Toulgoët, 1965
- Spatulosia malgassica Toulgoët, 1965
