= Hypomolis fassli =

Scientific classification
- Kingdom: Animalia
- Phylum: Arthropoda
- Class: Insecta
- Order: Lepidoptera
- Superfamily: Noctuoidea
- Family: Erebidae
- Subfamily: Arctiinae
- Genus: Hypomolis
- Species: H. fassli

Binomial name
- Hypomolis fassli Rothschild, 1911

Species of moth

Hypomolis fassli is a moth of the family Erebidae. It was described by Walter Rothschild in 1911. It is found in Colombia.
