= Pseudopharus nigra =

Scientific classification
- Domain: Eukaryota
- Kingdom: Animalia
- Phylum: Arthropoda
- Class: Insecta
- Order: Lepidoptera
- Superfamily: Noctuoidea
- Family: Erebidae
- Subfamily: Arctiinae
- Genus: Pseudopharus
- Species: P. nigra

Binomial name
- Pseudopharus nigra (Schaus, 1904)

Synonyms
- Neacerea nigra Schaus, 1904; Delphyre nigra

Species of moth

Pseudopharus nigra is a moth of the family Erebidae. It is found in Panama.
