= Hypomolis =

Scientific classification
- Kingdom: Animalia
- Phylum: Arthropoda
- Class: Insecta
- Order: Lepidoptera
- Superfamily: Noctuoidea
- Family: Erebidae
- Subfamily: Arctiinae
- Subtribe: Arctiina
- Genus: Hypomolis; Hampson, 1901

Genus of moths

Hypomolis is a genus of moths in the subfamily Arctiinae erected by George Hampson in 1901.

== Species ==
- Hypomolis aeruginosa Felder, 1874
- Hypomolis agnes Toulgoët, 1982
- Hypomolis aldaba Dognin, 1894
- Hypomolis evippus Druce, 1898
- Hypomolis fassli Rothschild, 1911
- Hypomolis lachaumei Toulgoët, 1982
- Hypomolis lymphasea Dognin, 1892
- Hypomolis ockendeni Rothschild, 1910
- Hypomolis roseicincta Dognin, 1913
- Hypomolis sanguinipectus Seitz, 1919
- Hypomolis thiaucourti Toulgoët, 1977
- Hypomolis venedictoffae Toulgoët, 1977
- Hypomolis virescens Rothschild, 1909
- Hypomolis viridella Strand, 1919
- Hypomolis viridis Druce, 1903
- Hypomolis viridoides Toulgoët, 1982
