= Astacosia =

Scientific classification
- Kingdom: Animalia
- Phylum: Arthropoda
- Class: Insecta
- Order: Lepidoptera
- Superfamily: Noctuoidea
- Family: Erebidae
- Subfamily: Arctiinae
- Tribe: Lithosiini
- Genus: Astacosia; Toulgoët, 1958

Type species
- Philenora oblonga (Toulgoët, 1955)

Genus of moths

Astacosia is a genus of moths in the subfamily Arctiinae. The genus was erected by Hervé de Toulgoët in 1958.

== Species ==
- Astacosia lineata Toulgoët, 1966
- Astacosia oblonga (Toulgoët, 1955)
- Astacosia ornatrix Toulgoët, 1958
