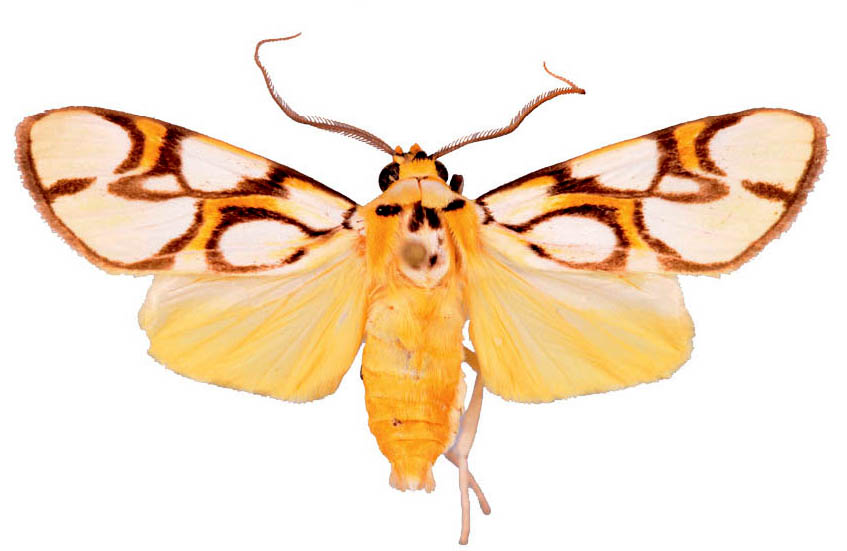
- Watsonidia

Scientific classification
- Kingdom: Animalia
- Phylum: Arthropoda
- Class: Insecta
- Order: Lepidoptera
- Superfamily: Noctuoidea
- Family: Erebidae
- Subfamily: Arctiinae
- Genus: Watsonidia
- Species: W. reimona

Binomial name
- Watsonidia reimona (Schaus, 1933)

Synonyms
- Glaucostola reimona Schaus, 1933

= Watsonidia reimona =

Species of moth

Watsonidia reimona is a moth in the family Erebidae first described by William Schaus in 1933. It is found in Colombia.
