= Astralarctia pulverosa =

Scientific classification
- Domain: Eukaryota
- Kingdom: Animalia
- Phylum: Arthropoda
- Class: Insecta
- Order: Lepidoptera
- Superfamily: Noctuoidea
- Family: Erebidae
- Subfamily: Arctiinae
- Genus: Astralarctia
- Species: A. pulverosa

Binomial name
- Astralarctia pulverosa (Schaus, 1905)

Synonyms
- Automolis pulverosa Schaus, 1905; Automolis amazonica Reich, 1933

Species of moth

Astralarctia pulverosa is a moth of the family Erebidae first described by William Schaus in 1905. It is found in French Guiana, Suriname, Guyana, Amazonas, Peru and Bolivia.
