= Kiriakoffalia costimacula =

Scientific classification
- Domain: Eukaryota
- Kingdom: Animalia
- Phylum: Arthropoda
- Class: Insecta
- Order: Lepidoptera
- Superfamily: Noctuoidea
- Family: Erebidae
- Subfamily: Arctiinae
- Genus: Kiriakoffalia
- Species: K. costimacula

Binomial name
- Kiriakoffalia costimacula (Joicey & Talbot, 1924)

Synonyms
- Pericallia costimacula Joicey & Talbot, 1924

Species of moth

Kiriakoffalia costimacula is a moth of the family Erebidae. It was described by James John Joicey and George Talbot in 1924. It is found in the Democratic Republic of the Congo, Kenya, Rwanda and Uganda.
