= Alepista =

Scientific classification
- Kingdom: Animalia
- Phylum: Arthropoda
- Clade: Pancrustacea
- Class: Insecta
- Order: Lepidoptera
- Superfamily: Noctuoidea
- Family: Erebidae
- Subfamily: Arctiinae
- Tribe: Lithosiini
- Genus: Alepista; Toulgoët, 1976
- Species: A. irregularis

Binomial name
- Alepista irregularis Toulgoët, 1976

Genus of moths

Alepista is a genus of moths in the subfamily Arctiinae. It contains the single species Alepista irregularis, which is found on Madagascar. Both the genus and species were first described by Hervé de Toulgoët in 1976.
