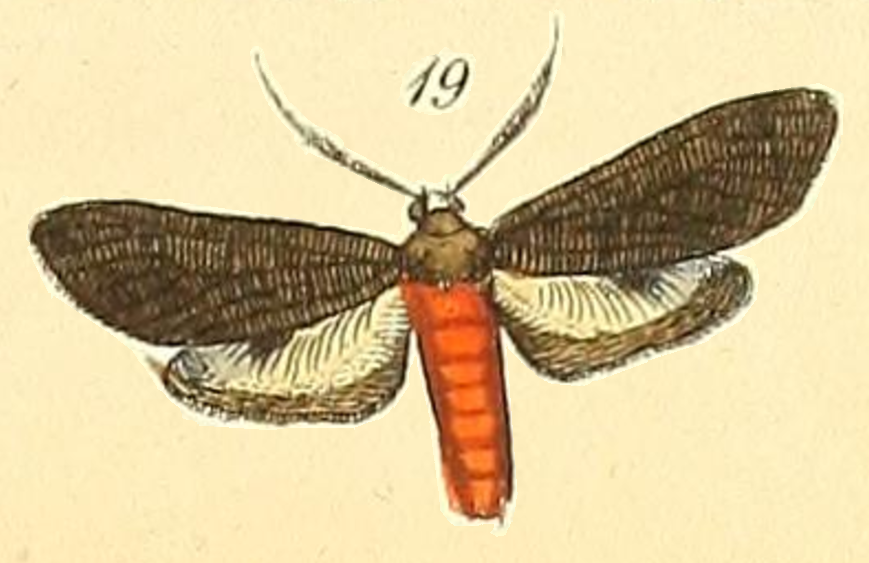

Scientific classification
- Kingdom: Animalia
- Phylum: Arthropoda
- Class: Insecta
- Order: Lepidoptera
- Superfamily: Noctuoidea
- Family: Erebidae
- Subfamily: Arctiinae
- Genus: Dipaenae
- Species: D. contenta

Binomial name
- Dipaenae contenta (Walker, 1854)

Synonyms
- Euchromia contenta Walker, 1854; Dipaena lateralis Walker, 1856; Zygaenopsis squamicornis R. Felder, 1874

= Dipaenae contenta =

Species of moth

Dipaenae contenta is a moth of the subfamily Arctiinae first described by Francis Walker in 1854. It is found in the Amazon region.
