= Toulgoetodes pallida =

Scientific classification
- Domain: Eukaryota
- Kingdom: Animalia
- Phylum: Arthropoda
- Class: Insecta
- Order: Lepidoptera
- Family: Crambidae
- Genus: Toulgoetodes
- Species: T. pallida

Binomial name
- Toulgoetodes pallida Leraut, 1988

Species of moth

Toulgoetodes pallida is a moth in the family Crambidae. It was described by Patrice J.A. Leraut in 1988. It is found in French Guiana.
