= Novosia =

Scientific classification
- Kingdom: Animalia
- Phylum: Arthropoda
- Class: Insecta
- Order: Lepidoptera
- Superfamily: Noctuoidea
- Family: Erebidae
- Subfamily: Arctiinae
- Tribe: Lithosiini
- Genus: Novosia; Toulgoët, 1958
- Species: N. herbuloti

Binomial name
- Novosia herbuloti (Toulgoët, 1954)

Synonyms
- Philenora herbuloti Toulgoët, 1954

Genus of moths

Novosia is a monotypic moth genus in the subfamily Arctiinae. Its single species, Novosia herbuloti, is found on Madagascar. Both the genus and species were first described by Hervé de Toulgoët, the genus in 1958 and the species in 1954.
