= Regobarrosia pseudoflavescens =

Scientific classification
- Domain: Eukaryota
- Kingdom: Animalia
- Phylum: Arthropoda
- Class: Insecta
- Order: Lepidoptera
- Superfamily: Noctuoidea
- Family: Erebidae
- Subfamily: Arctiinae
- Genus: Regobarrosia
- Species: R. pseudoflavescens

Binomial name
- Regobarrosia pseudoflavescens (Rothschild, 1910)

Synonyms
- Automolis pseudoflavescens Rothschild, 1910

Species of moth

Regobarrosia pseudoflavescens is a moth in the family Erebidae. It was described by Walter Rothschild in 1910. It is found in the Brazilian state of Minas Gerais.
