= Coiffaitarctia ockendeni =

Scientific classification
- Domain: Eukaryota
- Kingdom: Animalia
- Phylum: Arthropoda
- Class: Insecta
- Order: Lepidoptera
- Superfamily: Noctuoidea
- Family: Erebidae
- Subfamily: Arctiinae
- Genus: Coiffaitarctia
- Species: C. ockendeni

Binomial name
- Coiffaitarctia ockendeni (Rothschild, 1909)

Synonyms
- Araeomolis ockendeni Rothschild, 1909; Neritos ockendeni parvimacula Rothschild, 1922

Species of moth

Coiffaitarctia ockendeni is a moth of the family Erebidae first described by Walter Rothschild in 1909. It is found in French Guiana, Suriname, the Amazon region, Peru and Bolivia.
