= Hypomolis viridis =

Scientific classification
- Kingdom: Animalia
- Phylum: Arthropoda
- Class: Insecta
- Order: Lepidoptera
- Superfamily: Noctuoidea
- Family: Erebidae
- Subfamily: Arctiinae
- Genus: Hypomolis
- Species: H. viridis

Binomial name
- Hypomolis viridis (H. Druce, 1903)

Synonyms
- Phragmatobia viridis H. Druce, 1903

Species of moth

Hypomolis viridis is a moth of the family Erebidae. It was described by Herbert Druce in 1903. It is found in Peru.
