= Lepidokirbyia vittipes =

Scientific classification
- Kingdom: Animalia
- Phylum: Arthropoda
- Class: Insecta
- Order: Lepidoptera
- Superfamily: Noctuoidea
- Family: Erebidae
- Subfamily: Arctiinae
- Genus: Lepidokirbyia
- Species: L. vittipes

Binomial name
- Lepidokirbyia vittipes (Walker, 1855)

Synonyms
- Arara vittipes Walker, 1855; Arara vittipes vitellina Seitz, 1921; Automolis vitellina Seitz, 1921

Species of moth

Lepidokirbyia vittipes is a moth of the family Erebidae first described by Francis Walker in 1855. It is found in Panama, Brazil, Suriname, Paraguay, Ecuador, Peru and Colombia.

== Subspecies ==
- Lepidokirbyia vittipes vittipes (Brazil)
- Lepidokirbyia vittipes vitellina (Seitz, 1921) (Colombia)
