= Isorropus tricolor =

Scientific classification
- Domain: Eukaryota
- Kingdom: Animalia
- Phylum: Arthropoda
- Class: Insecta
- Order: Lepidoptera
- Superfamily: Noctuoidea
- Family: Erebidae
- Subfamily: Arctiinae
- Genus: Isorropus
- Species: I. tricolor

Binomial name
- Isorropus tricolor Butler, 1880

Synonyms
- Isorropus nigrodorsalis Le Cerf, 1921; Isorropus rectiscissa Rothschild, 1924

Species of moth

Isorropus tricolor is a moth of the subfamily Arctiinae. It was described by Arthur Gardiner Butler in 1880. It is found in Madagascar.
