= Micralarctia semipura =

Scientific classification
- Kingdom: Animalia
- Phylum: Arthropoda
- Class: Insecta
- Order: Lepidoptera
- Superfamily: Noctuoidea
- Family: Erebidae
- Subfamily: Arctiinae
- Genus: Micralarctia
- Species: M. semipura

Binomial name
- Micralarctia semipura (Bartel, 1903)

Synonyms
- Spilosoma semipura Bartel, 1903; Spilosoma nigripunctata Bartel, 1903

Species of moth

Micralarctia semipura is a moth of the family Erebidae. It was described by Max Bartel in 1903. It is found in Tanzania.
