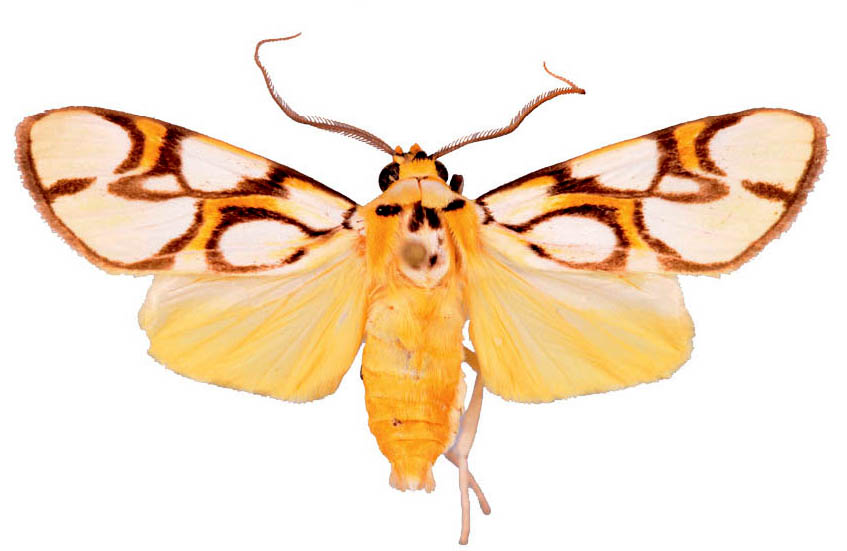
- Watsonidia sp.

Scientific classification
- Kingdom: Animalia
- Phylum: Arthropoda
- Class: Insecta
- Order: Lepidoptera
- Superfamily: Noctuoidea
- Family: Erebidae
- Subfamily: Arctiinae
- Subtribe: Phaegopterina
- Genus: Watsonidia; Toulgoët, 1981

= Watsonidia =

Genus of moths

Watsonidia is a genus of moths in the family Erebidae. The genus was erected by Hervé de Toulgoët in 1981.

== Species ==
- Watsonidia navatteae
- Watsonidia pardea
- Watsonidia porioni
- Watsonidia reimona
