= Senecauxia =

Scientific classification
- Domain: Eukaryota
- Kingdom: Animalia
- Phylum: Arthropoda
- Class: Insecta
- Order: Lepidoptera
- Superfamily: Noctuoidea
- Family: Erebidae
- Subfamily: Arctiinae
- Genus: Senecauxia; Toulgoët, 1989
- Species: S. coraliae

Binomial name
- Senecauxia coraliae Toulgoët, 1989

Genus of insects

Senecauxia is a monotypic moth genus in the family Erebidae. Its only species, Senecauxia coraliae, is found in French Guiana. Both the genus and the species were first described by Hervé de Toulgoët in 1989.
