= Dipaenae =

Scientific classification
- Kingdom: Animalia
- Phylum: Arthropoda
- Class: Insecta
- Order: Lepidoptera
- Superfamily: Noctuoidea
- Family: Erebidae
- Subfamily: Arctiinae
- Tribe: Lithosiini
- Genus: Dipaenae; Walker, 1854

Type species
- Euchromia ferruginosa Walker, 1854

Synonyms
- Zygaenopsis Felder, 1874; Dipaena Kirby, 1892

Genus of moths

Dipaenae is a genus of moths in the subfamily Arctiinae. The genus was erected by Francis Walker in 1854.

== Species ==
- Dipaenae contenta
- Dipaenae eucera
- Dipaenae ferruginosa
- Dipaenae incontenta
- Dipaenae moesta
- Dipaenae romani
- Dipaenae salcedo
- Dipaenae zygaenoides
