= Parexilisia =

Scientific classification
- Kingdom: Animalia
- Phylum: Arthropoda
- Class: Insecta
- Order: Lepidoptera
- Superfamily: Noctuoidea
- Family: Erebidae
- Subfamily: Arctiinae
- Tribe: Lithosiini
- Genus: Parexilisia; Toulgoët, 1958

Genus of moths

Parexilisia is a genus of moths in the family Erebidae. The genus was erected by Hervé de Toulgoët in 1958.

== Species ==
- Parexilisia bipunctoides Toulgoët, 1953
- Parexilisia diehli Toulgoët, 1958
- Parexilisia indecisa Toulgoët, 1956
- Parexilisia simulator Toulgoët, 1958
- Parexilisia submarginalis Toulgoët, 1958
