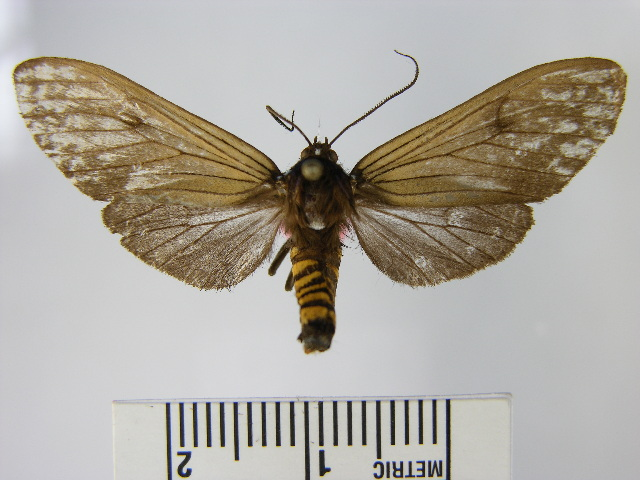
- Pseudopharus hades

Scientific classification
- Kingdom: Animalia
- Phylum: Arthropoda
- Class: Insecta
- Order: Lepidoptera
- Superfamily: Noctuoidea
- Family: Erebidae
- Subfamily: Arctiinae
- Subtribe: Phaegopterina
- Genus: Pseudopharus; Hampson, 1901

= Pseudopharus =

Genus of moths

Pseudopharus is a genus of moths in the family Erebidae. The genus was erected by George Hampson in 1901.

== Species ==
- Pseudopharus amata (Druce, 1900)
- Pseudopharus cornelia (Druce, 1906)
- Pseudopharus domingona (Druce, 1906)
- Pseudopharus hades Dognin, 1909
- Pseudopharus gibeauxi Toulgoët, 1990
- Pseudopharus nigra (Schaus, 1904)
