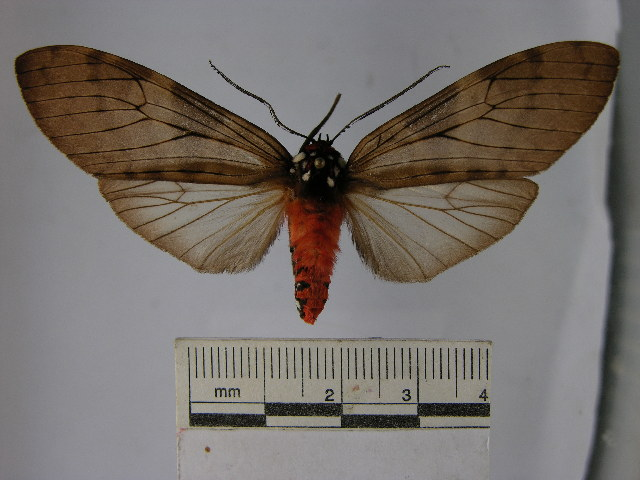

Scientific classification
- Kingdom: Animalia
- Phylum: Arthropoda
- Class: Insecta
- Order: Lepidoptera
- Superfamily: Noctuoidea
- Family: Erebidae
- Subfamily: Arctiinae
- Genus: Praemastus
- Species: P. albipuncta

Binomial name
- Praemastus albipuncta (Hampson, 1901)

Synonyms
- Amastus albipuncta Hampson, 1901

= Praemastus albipuncta =

Species of moth

Praemastus albipuncta is a moth in the subfamily Arctiinae. It was described by George Hampson in 1901. It is found in Venezuela.
