= Toulgarctia =

Scientific classification
- Kingdom: Animalia
- Phylum: Arthropoda
- Clade: Pancrustacea
- Class: Insecta
- Order: Lepidoptera
- Superfamily: Noctuoidea
- Family: Erebidae
- Subfamily: Arctiinae
- Subtribe: Spilosomina
- Genus: Toulgarctia; Dubatolov & Haynes, 2008

Type species
- Diacrisia madagascariensis luteoradians Toulgoët, 1954

Genus of moths

Toulgarctia is a genus of moths in the subfamily Arctiinae from Madagascar. The genus was erected by Vladimir Viktorovitch Dubatolov and Patrick G. Haynes in 2008.

== Species ==
- Toulgarctia griveaudi (Toulgoët, 1956)
- Toulgarctia luteoradians (Toulgoët, 1954)
  - Toulgarctia luteoradians jugicola (Toulgoët, 1976)
  - Toulgarctia luteoradians monochroma (Toulgoët, 1984)
- Toulgarctia milloti (Toulgoët, 1954)
- Toulgarctia viettei (Toulgoët, 1954)
- Toulgarctia vieui (Toulgoët, 1956)
