= Praemastus roseicorpus =

Scientific classification
- Domain: Eukaryota
- Kingdom: Animalia
- Phylum: Arthropoda
- Class: Insecta
- Order: Lepidoptera
- Superfamily: Noctuoidea
- Family: Erebidae
- Subfamily: Arctiinae
- Genus: Praemastus
- Species: P. roseicorpus

Binomial name
- Praemastus roseicorpus (Rothschild, 1935)

Synonyms
- Amastus roseicorpus Rothschild, 1935; Hemihyalea roseicorpus; Pseudohemihyalea roseicorpus

Species of moth

Praemastus roseicorpus is a moth in the subfamily Arctiinae. It was described by Rothschild in 1935. It is found in Venezuela.
