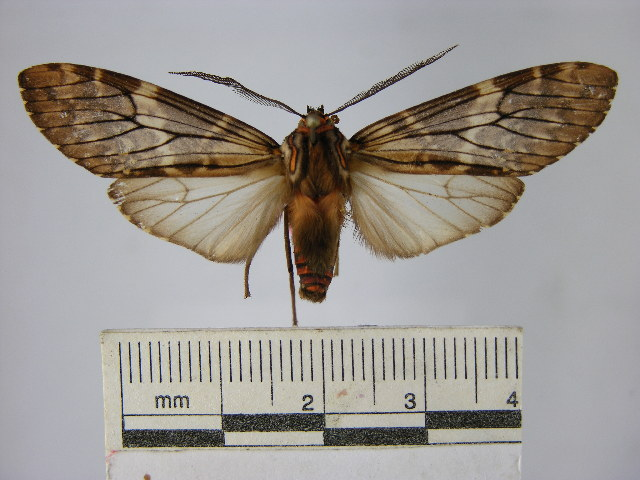
- Praemastus minerva minerva
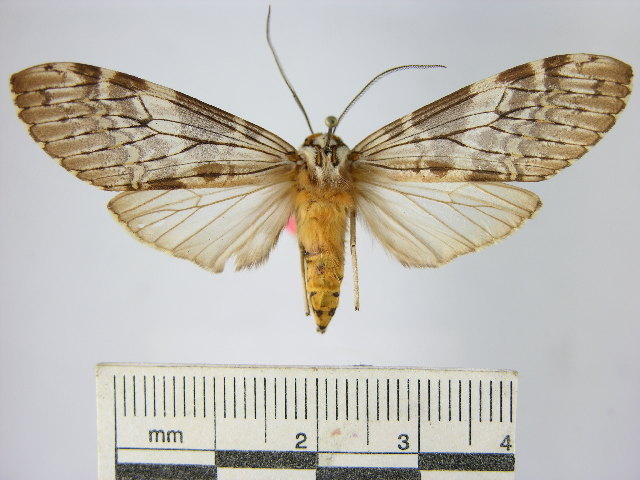
- Praemastus minerva watkinsi

Scientific classification
- Domain: Eukaryota
- Kingdom: Animalia
- Phylum: Arthropoda
- Class: Insecta
- Order: Lepidoptera
- Superfamily: Noctuoidea
- Family: Erebidae
- Subfamily: Arctiinae
- Genus: Praemastus
- Species: P. minerva

Binomial name
- Praemastus minerva (Dognin, 1891)

Synonyms
- Phaegoptera minerva Dognin, 1891; Amastus minerva; Hemihyalea minerva; Pseudohemihyalea minerva; Amastus watkinsi Rothschild, 1916; Hemihyalea watkinsi

= Praemastus minerva =

Species of moth

Praemastus minerva is a moth in the subfamily Arctiinae. It was described by Paul Dognin in 1891. It is found in Colombia, Ecuador, Bolivia and Peru.

== Subspecies ==
- Praemastus minerva minerva
- Praemastus minerva watkinsi (Rothschild, 1916) (Peru)
