= Astralarctia canalis =

Scientific classification
- Domain: Eukaryota
- Kingdom: Animalia
- Phylum: Arthropoda
- Class: Insecta
- Order: Lepidoptera
- Superfamily: Noctuoidea
- Family: Erebidae
- Subfamily: Arctiinae
- Genus: Astralarctia
- Species: A. canalis

Binomial name
- Astralarctia canalis (Schaus, 1921)

Synonyms
- Araeomolis canalis Schaus, 1921

Species of moth

Astralarctia canalis is a moth of the family Erebidae first described by William Schaus in 1921. It is found in Panama.
