= Venedictoffia =

Scientific classification
- Kingdom: Animalia
- Phylum: Arthropoda
- Class: Insecta
- Order: Lepidoptera
- Superfamily: Noctuoidea
- Family: Erebidae
- Subfamily: Arctiinae
- Tribe: Arctiini
- Genus: Venedictoffia; Toulgoët, 1977

Genus of moths

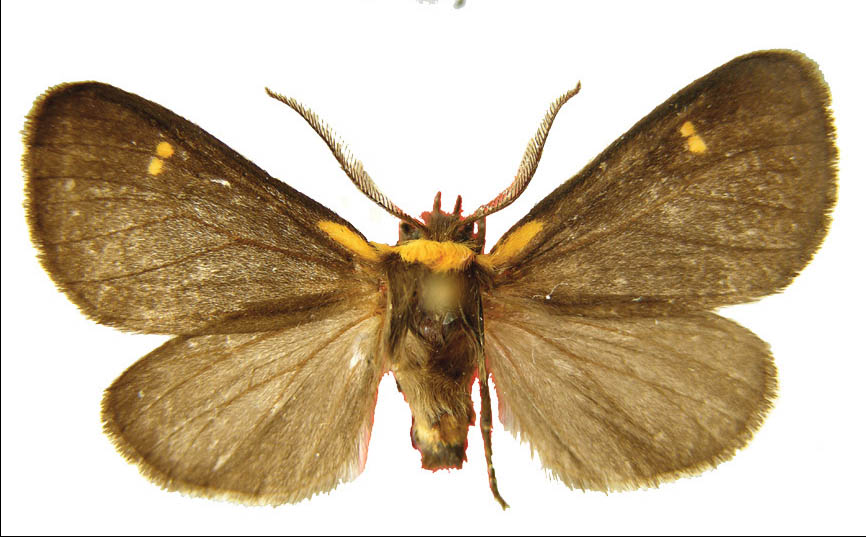
Venedictoffia flavicollis

Venedictoffia is a genus of moths in the subfamily Arctiinae. The genus was erected by Hervé de Toulgoët in 1977.

== Species ==
- Venedictoffia flavicollis Toulgoët, 1977
- Venedictoffia karsholti (Toulgoët, 1991)
