= Praemastus cymothoe =

Scientific classification
- Domain: Eukaryota
- Kingdom: Animalia
- Phylum: Arthropoda
- Class: Insecta
- Order: Lepidoptera
- Superfamily: Noctuoidea
- Family: Erebidae
- Subfamily: Arctiinae
- Genus: Praemastus
- Species: P. cymothoe

Binomial name
- Praemastus cymothoe (H. Druce, 1895)

Synonyms
- Amastus cymothoe H. Druce, 1895; Hemihyalea cymothoe; Pseudohemihyalea cymothoe; Praeamastus cymothoe H. Druce, 1895

Species of moth

Praemastus cymothoe is a moth in the subfamily Arctiinae. It was described by Herbert Druce in 1895. It is found in Bolivia and Colombia.
