= Micralarctia =

Scientific classification
- Kingdom: Animalia
- Phylum: Arthropoda
- Class: Insecta
- Order: Lepidoptera
- Superfamily: Noctuoidea
- Family: Erebidae
- Subfamily: Arctiinae
- Subtribe: Spilosomina
- Genus: Micralarctia; Watson, [1989]

Type species
- Spilosoma punctulatum Wallengren, 1860

Genus of moths

Micralarctia is a genus of moth in the family Erebidae from the Afrotropics.

== Species ==
- Micralarctia australis Watson, 1988 [1889]
- Micralarctia punctulatum (Wallengren, 1860)
  - Micralarctia punctulatum auricinctum (Butler, 1897)
  - Micralarctia punctulatum euproctina (Aurivillius, 1899 [1900])
  - Micralarctia punctulatum pura (Butler, 1878)
- Micralarctia semipura (Bartel, 1903)
- Micralarctia toulgoeti Watson, 1988 [1889]
