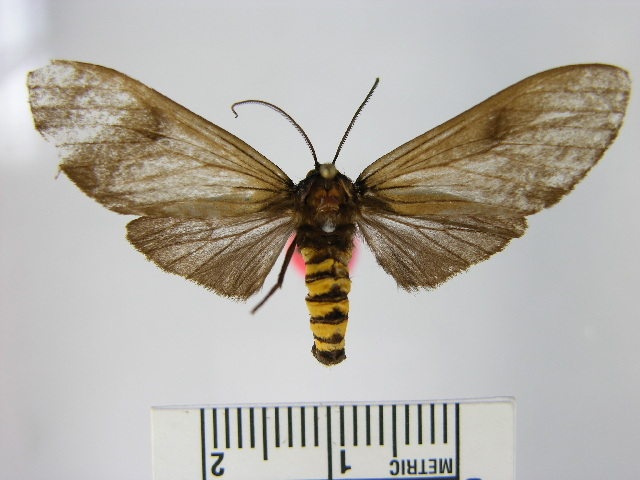

Scientific classification
- Kingdom: Animalia
- Phylum: Arthropoda
- Clade: Pancrustacea
- Class: Insecta
- Order: Lepidoptera
- Superfamily: Noctuoidea
- Family: Erebidae
- Subfamily: Arctiinae
- Genus: Pseudopharus
- Species: P. amata

Binomial name
- Pseudopharus amata (H. Druce, 1900)

Synonyms
- Opharus amata H. Druce, 1900

= Pseudopharus amata =

Species of moth

Pseudopharus amata is a species of moth in the family Erebidae. It was first described by Herbert Druce in 1900 and is found in Venezuela and Peru.
