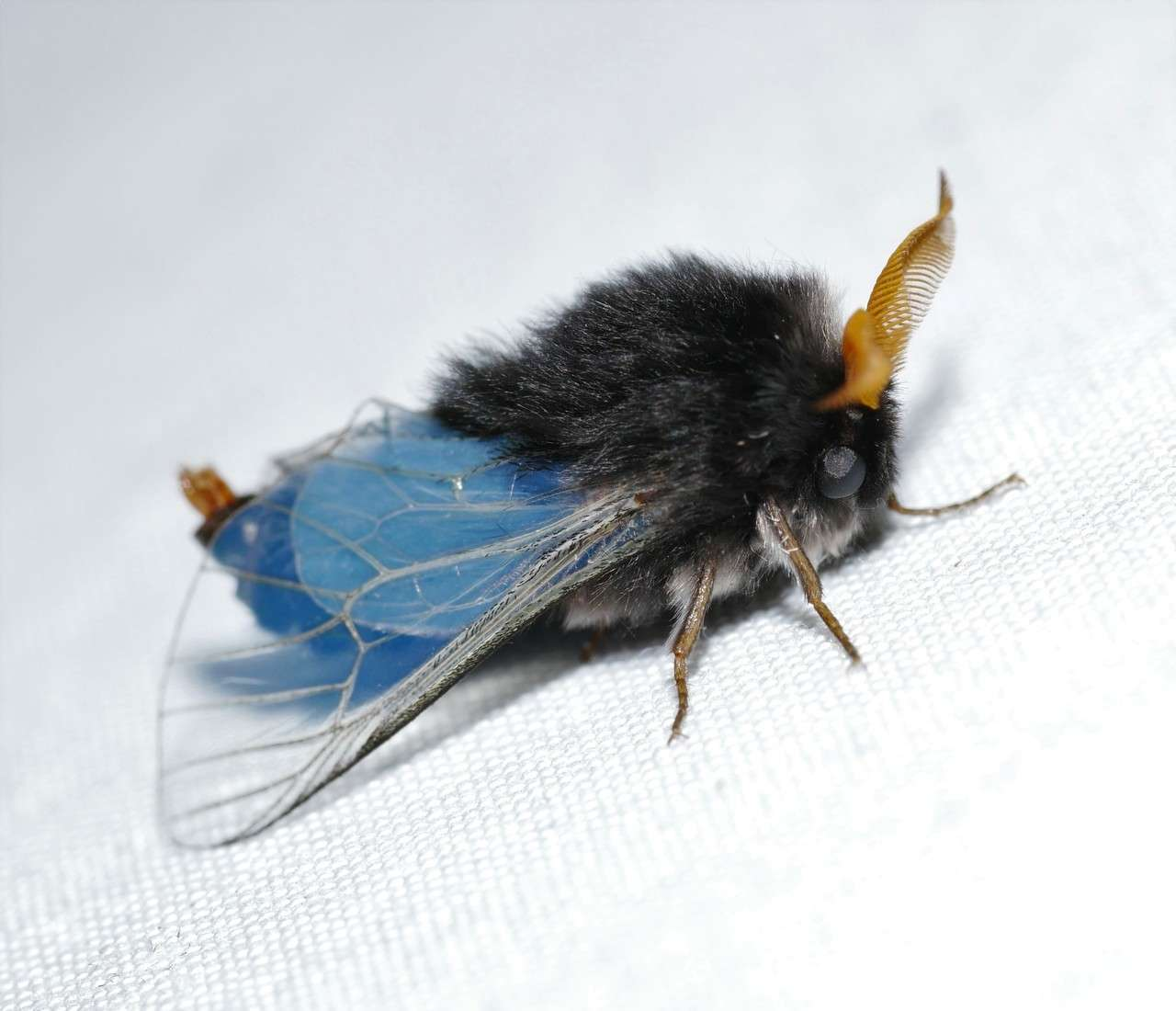
- Hyalarcta huebneri

Scientific classification
- Domain: Eukaryota
- Kingdom: Animalia
- Phylum: Arthropoda
- Class: Insecta
- Order: Lepidoptera
- Superfamily: Noctuoidea
- Family: Erebidae
- Subfamily: Arctiinae
- Subtribe: Phaegopterina
- Genus: Hyalarctia; Schaus, 1901

Synonyms
- Hyalarctia Hampson, 1901

= Hyalarctia =

Genus of moths

Hyalarctia is a genus of moths in the family Erebidae. The genus was erected by William Schaus in 1901.

== Species ==
- Hyalarctia bertrandi
- Hyalarctia sericea
- Hyalarctia tepica
