= Lepidokirbyia =

Scientific classification
- Domain: Eukaryota
- Kingdom: Animalia
- Phylum: Arthropoda
- Class: Insecta
- Order: Lepidoptera
- Superfamily: Noctuoidea
- Family: Erebidae
- Subfamily: Arctiinae
- Subtribe: Phaegopterina
- Genus: Lepidokirbyia; Travassos, 1943

Synonyms
- Arara Walker, 1855 (preocc. Spix, 1844)

Genus of moths

Lepidokirbyia is a genus of moths in the family Erebidae. The genus was described by Travassos in 1943.

== Species ==
- Lepidokirbyia venigera
- Lepidokirbyia vittipes
