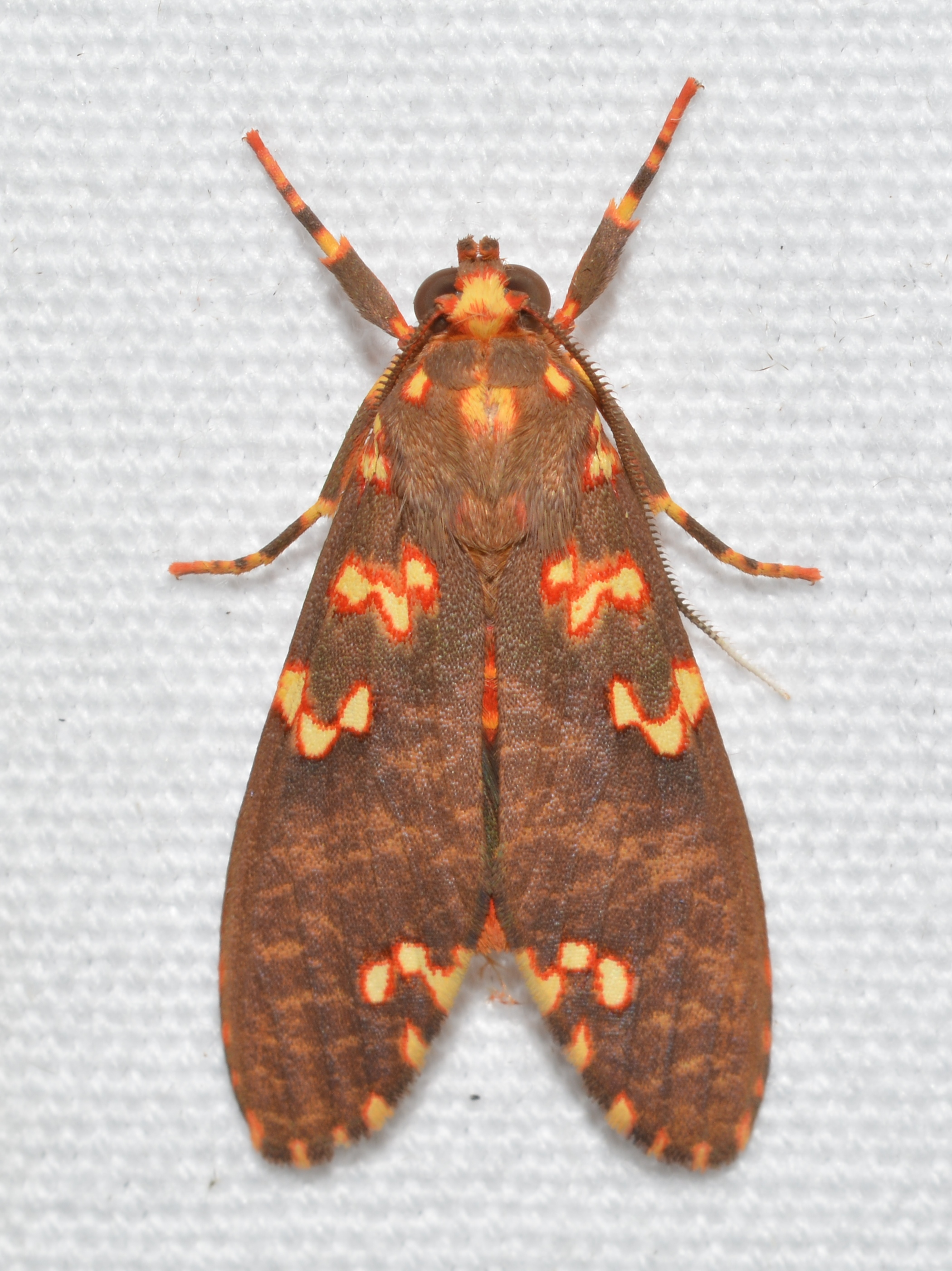
- Coiffaitarctia steniptera

Scientific classification
- Kingdom: Animalia
- Phylum: Arthropoda
- Class: Insecta
- Order: Lepidoptera
- Superfamily: Noctuoidea
- Family: Erebidae
- Subfamily: Arctiinae
- Subtribe: Phaegopterina
- Genus: Coiffaitarctia; Toulgoët, 1990

= Coiffaitarctia =

Genus of moths

Coiffaitarctia is a genus of moths in the family Erebidae. The genus was erected by Hervé de Toulgoët in 1990.

== Species ==
- Coiffaitarctia groisonae
- Coiffaitarctia henrici
- Coiffaitarctia ockendeni
- Coiffaitarctia steniptera
