= Praemastus steinbachi =

Scientific classification
- Domain: Eukaryota
- Kingdom: Animalia
- Phylum: Arthropoda
- Class: Insecta
- Order: Lepidoptera
- Superfamily: Noctuoidea
- Family: Erebidae
- Subfamily: Arctiinae
- Genus: Praemastus
- Species: P. steinbachi

Binomial name
- Praemastus steinbachi (Rothschild, 1909)

Synonyms
- Amastus steinbachi Rothschild, 1909

Species of moth

Praemastus steinbachi is a moth in the subfamily Arctiinae. It was described by Rothschild in 1909. It is found in Argentina.
