= Microhyle =

Scientific classification
- Kingdom: Animalia
- Phylum: Arthropoda
- Class: Insecta
- Order: Lepidoptera
- Superfamily: Noctuoidea
- Family: Erebidae
- Subfamily: Arctiinae
- Tribe: Lithosiini
- Genus: Microhyle; Hampson, 1905

Genus of moths

Microhyle is a genus of moths in the subfamily Arctiinae. The genus was erected by George Hampson in 1905.

== Species ==
- Microhyle fadella (Mabille, 1882)
- Microhyle leopardella Toulgoët, 1972
- Microhyle macularia Toulgoët, 1976
- Microhyle viettei Toulgoët, 1976
