= Dipaenae eucera =

Scientific classification
- Domain: Eukaryota
- Kingdom: Animalia
- Phylum: Arthropoda
- Class: Insecta
- Order: Lepidoptera
- Superfamily: Noctuoidea
- Family: Erebidae
- Subfamily: Arctiinae
- Genus: Dipaenae
- Species: D. eucera

Binomial name
- Dipaenae eucera (Felder, 1875)

Synonyms
- Cisthene eucera Felder, 1875

Species of insect

Dipaenae eucera is a moth of the subfamily Arctiinae, first described by Felder in 1875. It is found in Colombia.
