= Kiriakoffalia =

Scientific classification
- Kingdom: Animalia
- Phylum: Arthropoda
- Class: Insecta
- Order: Lepidoptera
- Superfamily: Noctuoidea
- Family: Erebidae
- Subfamily: Arctiinae
- Subtribe: Spilosomina
- Genus: Kiriakoffalia; Toulgoët, 1978

Type species
- Pericallia costimacula Joicey & Talbot, 1924

Synonyms
- Kiriakoffia Toulgoët, 1978

Genus of moths

Kiriakoffalia is a genus of tiger moths in the family Erebidae. The genus was erected by Hervé de Toulgoët in 1978. The moths in the genus are found in central Africa.

== Species ==
- Kiriakoffalia costimacula (Joicey & Talbot, 1924)
- Kiriakoffalia guineae (Strand, 1912)
- Kiriakoffalia lemairei (Toulgoët, 1976)
  - Kiriakoffalia lemairei paleacea (Toulgoët, 1978)
