= Micralarctia punctulatum =

Scientific classification
- Kingdom: Animalia
- Phylum: Arthropoda
- Class: Insecta
- Order: Lepidoptera
- Superfamily: Noctuoidea
- Family: Erebidae
- Subfamily: Arctiinae
- Genus: Micralarctia
- Species: M. punctulatum

Binomial name
- Micralarctia punctulatum (Wallengren, 1860)

Synonyms
- Spilosoma punctulatum Wallengren, 1860; Micralarctia punctulata; Diacrisia albescens Rothschild, 1910; Spilosoma edlingeri Bartel, 1903; Estigmene schraderi Rothschild, 1910; Spilosoma auricinctum Butler, 1897; Pais nyassana f. haplocraspis Hulstaert, 1923; Amsacta evadne Fawcett, 1915; Spilosoma nivaria Bartel, 1903; Spilosoma nyassana Bartel, 1903; Alpenus purus Butler, 1878; Spilosoma euproctina Aurivillius, 1900

Species of moth

Micralarctia punctulatum is a moth of the family Erebidae. It was described by Hans Daniel Johan Wallengren in 1860. It is found in Angola, Botswana, Cameroon, the Democratic Republic of the Congo, Eritrea, Ethiopia, Ghana, Kenya, Malawi, Mozambique, Namibia, Niger, Nigeria, Senegal, South Africa, Tanzania, Gambia, Uganda, Zambia and Zimbabwe.

The larvae have been recorded feeding on Ipomoea batates.

== Subspecies ==
- Micralarctia punctulatum punctulatum (Botswana, Malawi, Namibia, Zimbabwe)
- Micralarctia punctulatum auricinctum (Butler, 1897) (Angola, Democratic Republic of the Congo, Kenya, Malawi, Mozambique, Tanzania, Uganda, Zambia)
- Micralarctia punctulatum euproctina (Aurivillius, 1899 [1900]) (Angola, Cameroon, Ghana, Niger, Nigeria, Senegal, South Africa, Tanzania)
- Micralarctia punctulatum pura (Butler, 1878) (Democratic Republic of the Congo, Eritrea, Ethiopia, Kenya, Tanzania, Uganda)
