= Pseudamastus =

Scientific classification
- Kingdom: Animalia
- Phylum: Arthropoda
- Clade: Pancrustacea
- Class: Insecta
- Order: Lepidoptera
- Superfamily: Noctuoidea
- Family: Erebidae
- Subfamily: Arctiinae
- Genus: Pseudamastus; Toulgoët, 1985
- Species: P. alsa

Binomial name
- Pseudamastus alsa (H. Druce, 1890)

Synonyms
- Phaegoptera alsa H. Druce, 1890

Genus of moths

Pseudamastus is a monotypic moth genus in the family Erebidae described by Hervé de Toulgoët in 1985. The genus contains only one species, Pseudamastus alsa, first described by Herbert Druce in 1890. It is found on Dominica, Guadeloupe and Martinique.

== Subspecies ==
- Pseudamastus alsa alsa (Guadeloupe, Dominica)
- Pseudamastus alsa lalannei Toulgoët, 1985 (Martinique)
