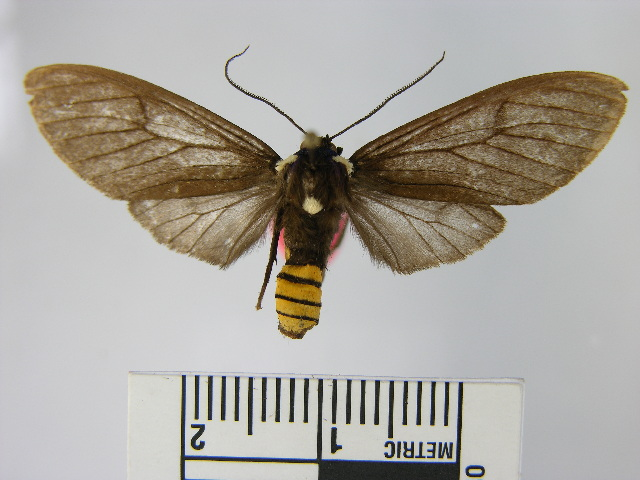

Scientific classification
- Domain: Eukaryota
- Kingdom: Animalia
- Phylum: Arthropoda
- Class: Insecta
- Order: Lepidoptera
- Superfamily: Noctuoidea
- Family: Erebidae
- Subfamily: Arctiinae
- Genus: Pseudopharus
- Species: P. domingona

Binomial name
- Pseudopharus domingona (H. Druce, 1906)

Synonyms
- Opharus domingona H. Druce, 1906

= Pseudopharus domingona =

Species of moth

Pseudopharus domingona is a moth in the family Erebidae first described by Herbert Druce in 1916. It is found in Peru.
