= Hypomolis ockendeni =

Scientific classification
- Kingdom: Animalia
- Phylum: Arthropoda
- Class: Insecta
- Order: Lepidoptera
- Superfamily: Noctuoidea
- Family: Erebidae
- Subfamily: Arctiinae
- Genus: Hypomolis
- Species: H. ockendeni

Binomial name
- Hypomolis ockendeni (Rothschild, 1910)

Synonyms
- Diacrisia ockendeni Rothschild, 1910

Species of moth

Hypomolis ockendeni is a moth of the family Erebidae. It was described by Walter Rothschild in 1910. It is found in Peru.
