= Gorgonidia helenae =

Scientific classification
- Domain: Eukaryota
- Kingdom: Animalia
- Phylum: Arthropoda
- Class: Insecta
- Order: Lepidoptera
- Superfamily: Noctuoidea
- Family: Erebidae
- Subfamily: Arctiinae
- Genus: Gorgonidia
- Species: G. helenae

Binomial name
- Gorgonidia helenae Vincent, 2012

Species of moth

Gorgonidia helenae is a moth of the family Erebidae. It is found in Guatemala.
