= Praemastus rhodator =

Scientific classification
- Kingdom: Animalia
- Phylum: Arthropoda
- Class: Insecta
- Order: Lepidoptera
- Superfamily: Noctuoidea
- Family: Erebidae
- Subfamily: Arctiinae
- Genus: Praemastus
- Species: P. rhodator

Binomial name
- Praemastus rhodator (Hampson, 1901)

Synonyms
- Amastus rhodator Hampson, 1901; Pseudohemihyalea rhodator; Hemihyalea rhodator

Species of moth

Praemastus rhodator is a moth in the subfamily Arctiinae. It was described by George Hampson in 1901. It is found in Bolivia.
