= Paulianosia =

Scientific classification
- Kingdom: Animalia
- Phylum: Arthropoda
- Class: Insecta
- Order: Lepidoptera
- Superfamily: Noctuoidea
- Family: Erebidae
- Subfamily: Arctiinae
- Tribe: Lithosiini
- Genus: Paulianosia; Toulgoët, 1958
- Species: P. clathrata

Binomial name
- Paulianosia clathrata Toulgoët, 1958

Genus of moths

Paulianosia is a monotypic moth genus in the subfamily Arctiinae. Its single species, Paulianosia clathrata, is found on Madagascar. Both the genus and species were first described by Hervé de Toulgoët in 1958.
