= Proxhyle =

Scientific classification
- Kingdom: Animalia
- Phylum: Arthropoda
- Class: Insecta
- Order: Lepidoptera
- Superfamily: Noctuoidea
- Family: Erebidae
- Subfamily: Arctiinae
- Tribe: Lithosiini
- Genus: Proxhyle; Toulgoët, 1959

Genus of moths

Proxhyle is a genus of moths in the subfamily Arctiinae. The genus was erected by Hervé de Toulgoët in 1959.

== Species ==
- Proxhyle cinerascens Toulgoët, 1959
- Proxhyle comoreana Toulgoët, 1959
- Proxhyle vadoni Toulgoët, 1953
