= Dipaenae romani =

Scientific classification
- Kingdom: Animalia
- Phylum: Arthropoda
- Class: Insecta
- Order: Lepidoptera
- Superfamily: Noctuoidea
- Family: Erebidae
- Subfamily: Arctiinae
- Genus: Dipaenae
- Species: D. romani

Binomial name
- Dipaenae romani Bryk, 1953

Species of moth

Dipaenae romani is a moth of the subfamily Arctiinae. It was described from San Gabriel.
