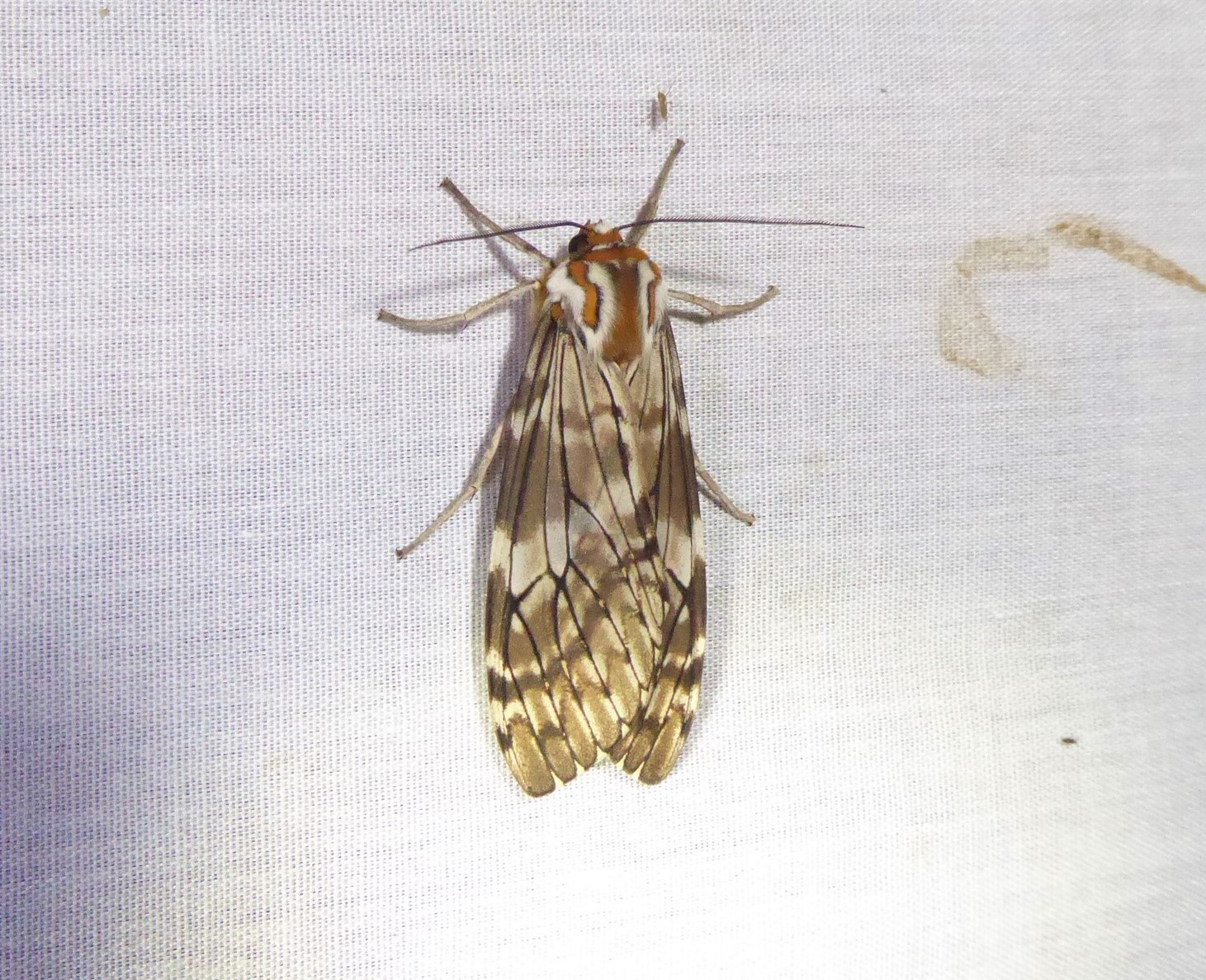
- Praeamastus spp.

Scientific classification
- Kingdom: Animalia
- Phylum: Arthropoda
- Class: Insecta
- Order: Lepidoptera
- Superfamily: Noctuoidea
- Family: Erebidae
- Subfamily: Arctiinae
- Genus: Praemastus; Toulgoët, 1991

= Praemastus =

Genus of moths

Praemastus is a genus of moths in the subfamily Arctiinae. The genus was erected by Hervé de Toulgoët in 1991.

== Species ==
- Praemastus albicinctus Toulgoët, 1990
- Praemastus albipuncta Hampson, 1901
- Praemastus cymothoe Druce, 1895
- Praemastus flavidus Dognin, 1912
- Praemastus fulvizonata Hampson, 1909
- Praemastus minerva Dognin, 1891
- Praemastus rhodator Hampson, 1901
- Praemastus roseicorpus Rothschild, 1935
- Praemastus steinbachi Rothschild, 1909
