= Dipaenae incontenta =

Scientific classification
- Kingdom: Animalia
- Phylum: Arthropoda
- Class: Insecta
- Order: Lepidoptera
- Superfamily: Noctuoidea
- Family: Erebidae
- Subfamily: Arctiinae
- Genus: Dipaenae
- Species: D. incontenta

Binomial name
- Dipaenae incontenta (Schaus, 1905)

Synonyms
- Dipaena incontenta Schaus, 1905

Species of moth

Dipaenae incontenta is a moth of the subfamily Arctiinae. It is found in French Guiana.
