= Micralarctia australis =

Scientific classification
- Domain: Eukaryota
- Kingdom: Animalia
- Phylum: Arthropoda
- Class: Insecta
- Order: Lepidoptera
- Superfamily: Noctuoidea
- Family: Erebidae
- Subfamily: Arctiinae
- Genus: Micralarctia
- Species: M. australis

Binomial name
- Micralarctia australis Watson, 1988

Species of moth

Micralarctia australis is a moth of the family Erebidae. It was described by Watson in 1988. It is found in Namibia.
