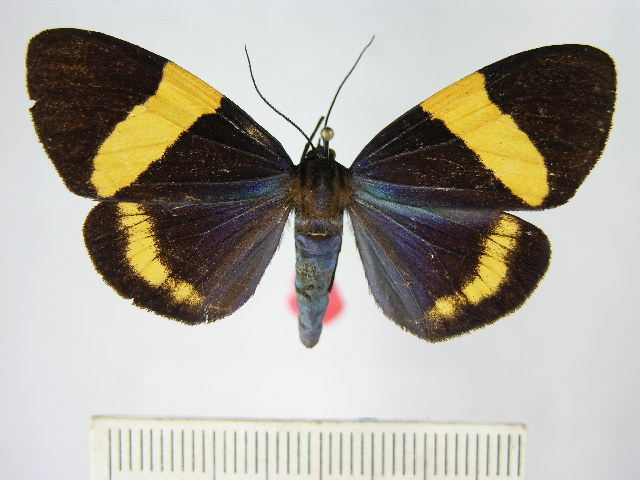

Scientific classification
- Kingdom: Animalia
- Phylum: Arthropoda
- Class: Insecta
- Order: Lepidoptera
- Superfamily: Noctuoidea
- Family: Erebidae
- Subfamily: Arctiinae
- Genus: Eucyanoides; Toulgoët, 1988
- Species: E. investigatorum

Binomial name
- Eucyanoides investigatorum Toulgoët, 1988

= Eucyanoides =

Genus of moths

Eucyanoides is a monotypic moth genus in the subfamily Arctiinae. Its single species, Eucyanoides investigatorum, is found in Panama. Both the genus and species were first described by Hervé de Toulgoët in 1988.
