= Galtarodes =

Scientific classification
- Kingdom: Animalia
- Phylum: Arthropoda
- Class: Insecta
- Order: Lepidoptera
- Superfamily: Noctuoidea
- Family: Erebidae
- Subfamily: Arctiinae
- Genus: Galtarodes; Toulgoët, 1980
- Species: G. ragonoti

Binomial name
- Galtarodes ragonoti (Mabille, 1880)

Synonyms
- Euchelia ragonoti Mabille, 1880; Galtara viettei Toulgoët, 1971

Genus of moths

Galtarodes is a monotypic moth genus in the family Noctuidae erected by Hervé de Toulgoët in 1980. Its single species, Galtarodes ragonoti, was first described by Paul Mabille in 1880. It is found on Madagascar.
