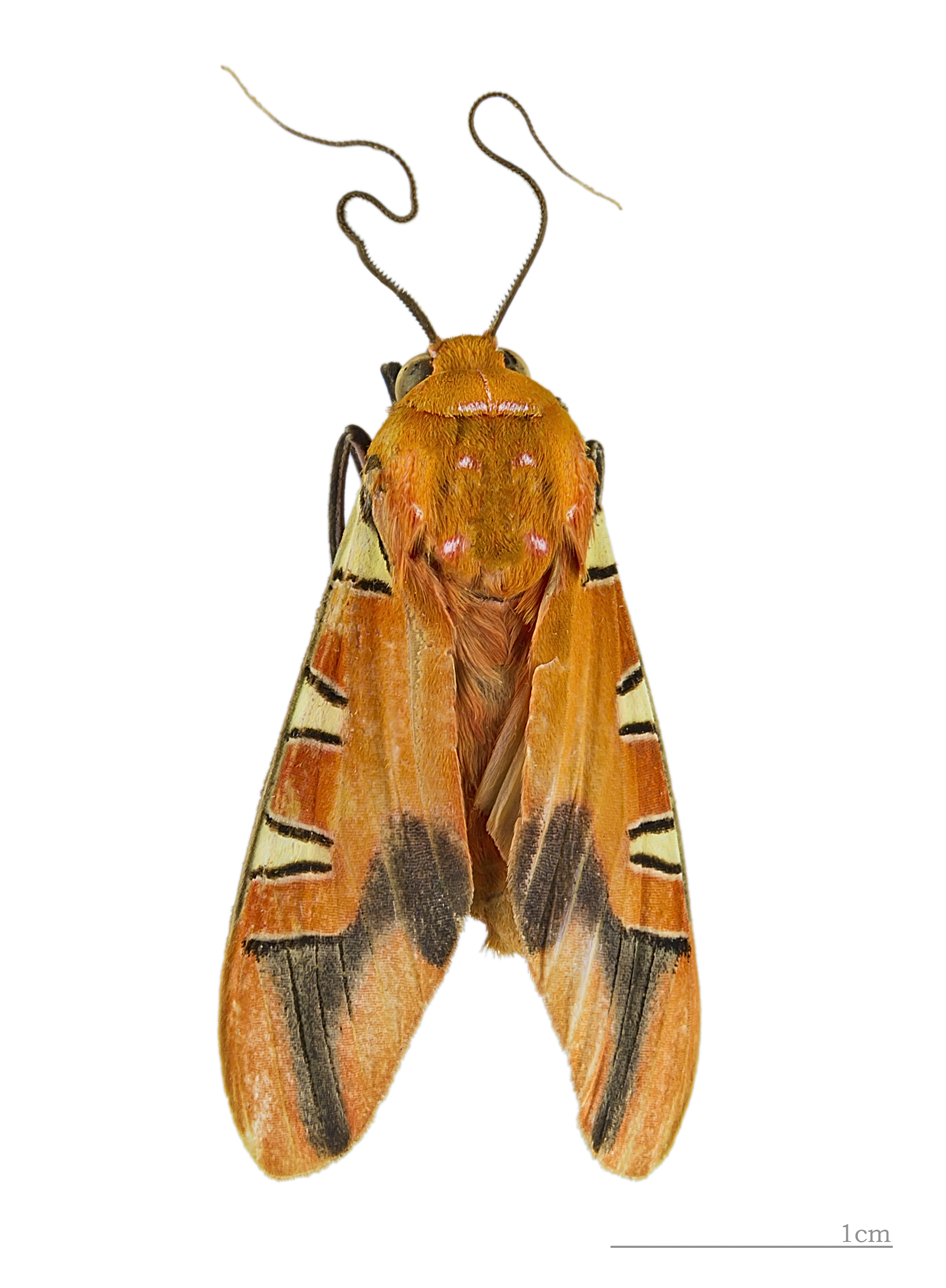
- Gorgonidia maronensis

Scientific classification
- Kingdom: Animalia
- Phylum: Arthropoda
- Class: Insecta
- Order: Lepidoptera
- Superfamily: Noctuoidea
- Family: Erebidae
- Subfamily: Arctiinae
- Subtribe: Phaegopterina
- Genus: Gorgonidia; Dyar, 1898

Type species
- Zatrephes garleppi Druce, 1898

= Gorgonidia =

Genus of moths

Gorgonidia is a genus of moths in the family Erebidae. The genus was erected by Harrison Gray Dyar Jr. in 1898.

== Species ==
- Gorgonidia buckleyi
- Gorgonidia cubotaensis
- Gorgonidia garleppi
- Gorgonidia harterti
- Gorgonidia helenae Vincent, 2012
- Gorgonidia inversa
- Gorgonidia maronensis
- Gorgonidia vulcania
- Gorgonidia withfordi
