= Hypomolis viridella =

Scientific classification
- Kingdom: Animalia
- Phylum: Arthropoda
- Class: Insecta
- Order: Lepidoptera
- Superfamily: Noctuoidea
- Family: Erebidae
- Subfamily: Arctiinae
- Genus: Hypomolis
- Species: H. viridella

Binomial name
- Hypomolis viridella (Strand, 1919)

Synonyms
- Diacrisia viridella Strand, 1919; Diacrisia viridis Dognin, 1903 (preocc. Druce, 1903)

Species of moth

Hypomolis viridella is a moth of the family Erebidae. It was described by Embrik Strand in 1919. It is found in Peru.
