= Isorropus celena =

Scientific classification
- Kingdom: Animalia
- Phylum: Arthropoda
- Class: Insecta
- Order: Lepidoptera
- Superfamily: Noctuoidea
- Family: Erebidae
- Subfamily: Arctiinae
- Tribe: Lithosiini
- Genus: Isorropus
- Species: I. celena

Binomial name
- Isorropus celena Walker, 1854

Synonyms
- Antona celena (Walker, 1854); Isorropus purpurata Butler, 1897; Isorropus romani Bryk, 1953; Isorropus trajecta Walker, 1864

Species of moths

Isorropus celena is a species in the moth family Erebidae, found in South America.
