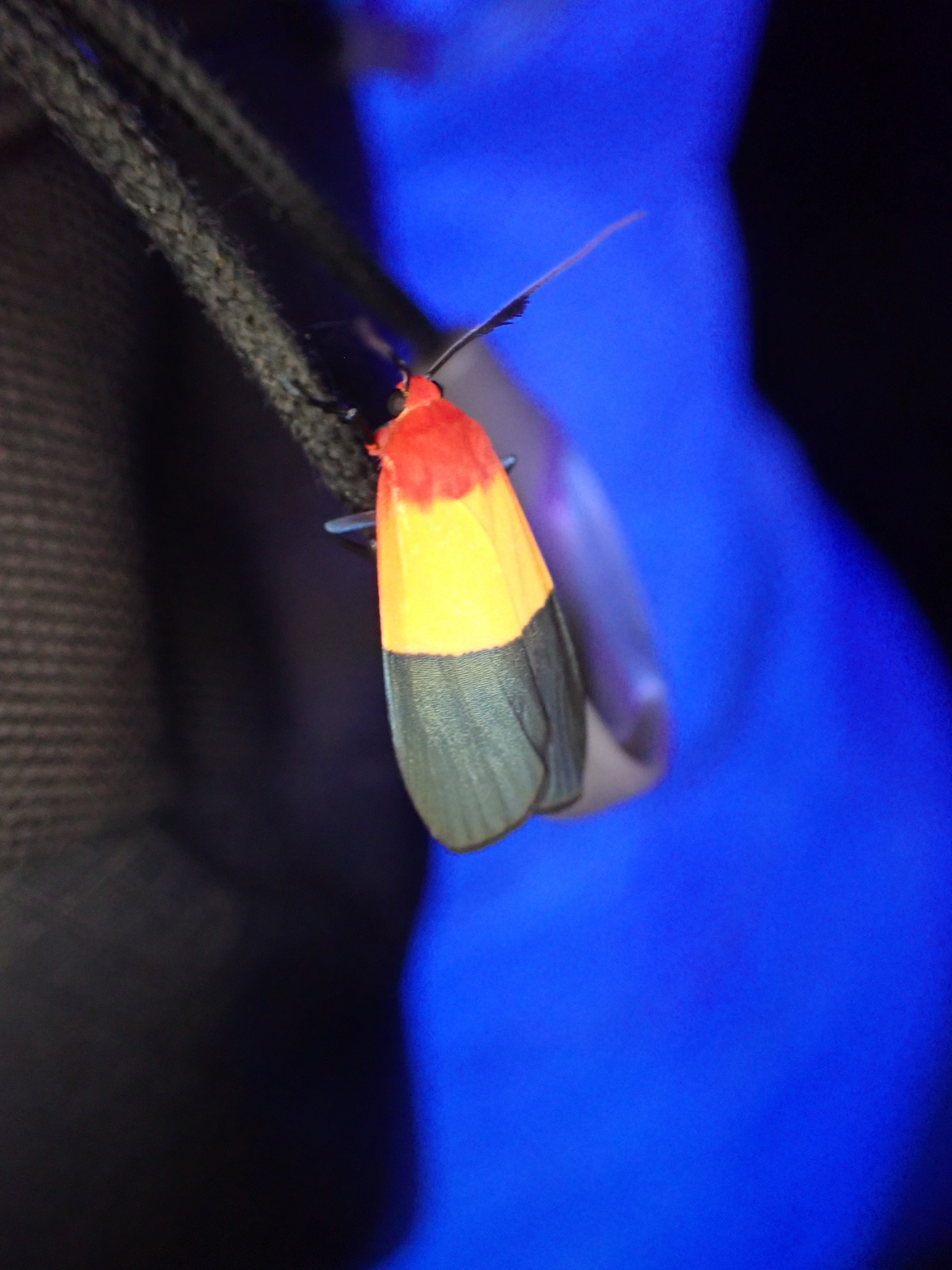
- Isorropus tricolor, Madagascar

Scientific classification
- Domain: Eukaryota
- Kingdom: Animalia
- Phylum: Arthropoda
- Class: Insecta
- Order: Lepidoptera
- Superfamily: Noctuoidea
- Family: Erebidae
- Subfamily: Arctiinae
- Tribe: Lithosiini
- Genus: Isorropus; Butler, 1880

= Isorropus =

Genus of moths

Isorropus is a genus of lichen moths in the family Erebidae. There are about 11 described species in Isorropus, found in Madagascar and South America.

== Species ==
These 11 species belong to the genus Isorropus:

- Isorropus aureomaculata Reich, 1935 (South America)
- Isorropus celena Walker, 1854 (South America)
- Isorropus fasciata Rothschild, 1912
- Isorropus funeralis Kenrick, 1914 (Madagascar)
- Isorropus lateritea de Toulgoët, 1956 (Madagascar)
- Isorropus pseudocelena Bryk, 1953 (South America)
- Isorropus sanguinolenta Mabille, 1878 (Madagascar)
- Isorropus sibyllae Druce, 1885
- Isorropus splendidus de Toulgoët, 1956 (Madagascar)
- Isorropus tricolor Butler, 1880 (Madagascar)
