= Gorgonidia inversa =

Scientific classification
- Domain: Eukaryota
- Kingdom: Animalia
- Phylum: Arthropoda
- Class: Insecta
- Order: Lepidoptera
- Superfamily: Noctuoidea
- Family: Erebidae
- Subfamily: Arctiinae
- Genus: Gorgonidia
- Species: G. inversa

Binomial name
- Gorgonidia inversa (Rothschild, 1910)

Synonyms
- Automolis garleppi inversa Rothschild, 1910

Species of moth

Gorgonidia inversa is a moth of the family Erebidae first described by Walter Rothschild in 1910. It is found in Peru.
