= Metexilisia =

Scientific classification
- Kingdom: Animalia
- Phylum: Arthropoda
- Class: Insecta
- Order: Lepidoptera
- Superfamily: Noctuoidea
- Family: Erebidae
- Subfamily: Arctiinae
- Tribe: Lithosiini
- Genus: Metexilisia; Toulgoët, 1958
- Species: M. citrago

Binomial name
- Metexilisia citrago Toulgoët, 1958

Genus of moths

Metexilisia is a monotypic moth genus in the subfamily Arctiinae. Its single species, Metexilisia citrago, is found in Madagascar. Both the genus and species were first described by Hervé de Toulgoët in 1958.
