= Toulgoetodes boudinoti =

Scientific classification
- Domain: Eukaryota
- Kingdom: Animalia
- Phylum: Arthropoda
- Class: Insecta
- Order: Lepidoptera
- Family: Crambidae
- Genus: Toulgoetodes
- Species: T. boudinoti

Binomial name
- Toulgoetodes boudinoti Leraut, 1988

Species of moth

Toulgoetodes boudinoti is a moth in the family Crambidae. It was described by Patrice J.A. Leraut in 1988. It is found on Guadeloupe.
