= Regobarrosia =

Scientific classification
- Domain: Eukaryota
- Kingdom: Animalia
- Phylum: Arthropoda
- Class: Insecta
- Order: Lepidoptera
- Superfamily: Noctuoidea
- Family: Erebidae
- Subfamily: Arctiinae
- Subtribe: Phaegopterina
- Genus: Regobarrosia; Watson, 1975

Genus of moths

Regobarrosia is a genus of moths in the family Erebidae described by Watson in 1975.

== Species ==
- Regobarrosia aureogrisea Rothschild, 1909
- Regobarrosia flavescens Walker, 1856
- Regobarrosia pseudoflavescens Rothschild, 1910
- Regobarrosia villiersi Toulgoët, 1984
