= Dipaenae salcedo =

Scientific classification
- Domain: Eukaryota
- Kingdom: Animalia
- Phylum: Arthropoda
- Class: Insecta
- Order: Lepidoptera
- Superfamily: Noctuoidea
- Family: Erebidae
- Subfamily: Arctiinae
- Genus: Dipaenae
- Species: D. salcedo

Binomial name
- Dipaenae salcedo (Dognin, 1898)

Synonyms
- Anycles salcedo Dognin, 1898

Species of moth

Dipaenae salcedo is a moth of the subfamily Arctiinae first described by Paul Dognin in 1898. It is found in Panama and Ecuador.
