= Cristulosia =

Scientific classification
- Kingdom: Animalia
- Phylum: Arthropoda
- Class: Insecta
- Order: Lepidoptera
- Superfamily: Noctuoidea
- Family: Erebidae
- Subfamily: Arctiinae
- Tribe: Lithosiini
- Genus: Cristulosia; Toulgoët, 1958

Genus of moths

Cristulosia is a genus of moths in the subfamily Arctiinae. The genus was erected by Hervé de Toulgoët in 1958.

== Species ==
- Cristulosia bilunata Toulgoët, 1958
- Cristulosia deceptans Toulgoët, 1956
