= Hyalarctia sericea =

Scientific classification
- Domain: Eukaryota
- Kingdom: Animalia
- Phylum: Arthropoda
- Class: Insecta
- Order: Lepidoptera
- Superfamily: Noctuoidea
- Family: Erebidae
- Subfamily: Arctiinae
- Genus: Hyalarctia
- Species: H. sericea

Binomial name
- Hyalarctia sericea Schaus, 1901

Species of moth

Hyalarctia sericea is a moth of the family Erebidae first described by William Schaus in 1901. It is found in Brazil, Paraguay and Argentina.
