= Regobarrosia aureogrisea =

Scientific classification
- Domain: Eukaryota
- Kingdom: Animalia
- Phylum: Arthropoda
- Class: Insecta
- Order: Lepidoptera
- Superfamily: Noctuoidea
- Family: Erebidae
- Subfamily: Arctiinae
- Genus: Regobarrosia
- Species: R. aureogrisea

Binomial name
- Regobarrosia aureogrisea (Rothschild, 1909)

Synonyms
- Automolis aureogrisea Rothschild, 1909

Species of moth

Regobarrosia aureogrisea is a moth in the family Erebidae. It was described by Walter Rothschild in 1909. It is found in French Guiana, Peru and Bolivia.
