= Hypomolis roseicincta =

Scientific classification
- Kingdom: Animalia
- Phylum: Arthropoda
- Clade: Pancrustacea
- Class: Insecta
- Order: Lepidoptera
- Superfamily: Noctuoidea
- Family: Erebidae
- Subfamily: Arctiinae
- Genus: Hypomolis
- Species: H. roseicincta

Binomial name
- Hypomolis roseicincta (Dognin, 1913)

Synonyms
- Diacrisia roseicincta Dognin, 1913

Species of moth

Hypomolis roseicincta is a moth of the family Erebidae. It was described by Paul Dognin in 1913. It is found in Colombia.
