= Isorropus funeralis =

Scientific classification
- Domain: Eukaryota
- Kingdom: Animalia
- Phylum: Arthropoda
- Class: Insecta
- Order: Lepidoptera
- Superfamily: Noctuoidea
- Family: Erebidae
- Subfamily: Arctiinae
- Genus: Isorropus
- Species: I. funeralis

Binomial name
- Isorropus funeralis (Kenrick, 1914)

Synonyms
- Ilema funeralis Kenrick, 1914; Eilema funeralis

Species of moth

Isorropus funeralis is a moth of the subfamily Arctiinae. It was described by George Hamilton Kenrick in 1914. It is found on Madagascar.
