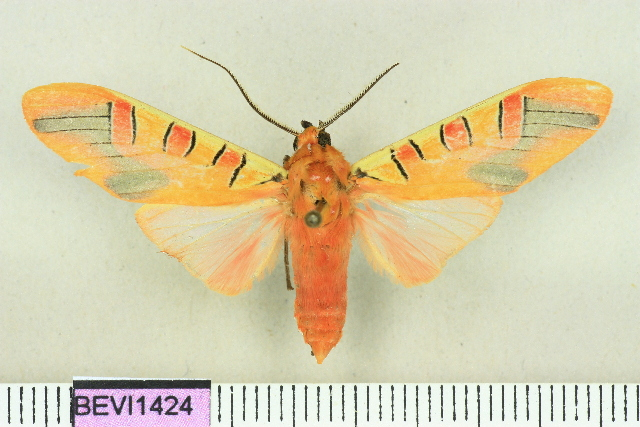

Scientific classification
- Domain: Eukaryota
- Kingdom: Animalia
- Phylum: Arthropoda
- Class: Insecta
- Order: Lepidoptera
- Superfamily: Noctuoidea
- Family: Erebidae
- Subfamily: Arctiinae
- Genus: Gorgonidia
- Species: G. cubotaensis

Binomial name
- Gorgonidia cubotaensis (Reich, 1938)

Synonyms
- Automolis garleppi cubotaensis Reich, 1938

= Gorgonidia cubotaensis =

Species of moth

Gorgonidia cubotaensis is a moth of the family Erebidae first described by Reich in 1938. It is found in Brazil.
