= Gorgonidia buckleyi =

Scientific classification
- Domain: Eukaryota
- Kingdom: Animalia
- Phylum: Arthropoda
- Class: Insecta
- Order: Lepidoptera
- Superfamily: Noctuoidea
- Family: Erebidae
- Subfamily: Arctiinae
- Genus: Gorgonidia
- Species: G. buckleyi

Binomial name
- Gorgonidia buckleyi (H. Druce, 1898)

Synonyms
- Zatrephes buckleyi H. Druce, 1883

Species of moth

Gorgonidia buckleyi is a moth of the family Erebidae first described by Herbert Druce in 1898. It is found in Napo Province, Ecuador.
