= Hypomolis evippus =

Scientific classification
- Kingdom: Animalia
- Phylum: Arthropoda
- Class: Insecta
- Order: Lepidoptera
- Superfamily: Noctuoidea
- Family: Erebidae
- Subfamily: Arctiinae
- Genus: Hypomolis
- Species: H. evippus

Binomial name
- Hypomolis evippus (H. Druce, 1898)

Synonyms
- Idalus evippus H. Druce, 1898

Species of moth

Hypomolis evippus is a moth of the family Erebidae. It was described by Herbert Druce in 1898. It is found in Bolivia.
