= Turlinia =

Scientific classification
- Kingdom: Animalia
- Phylum: Arthropoda
- Class: Insecta
- Order: Lepidoptera
- Superfamily: Noctuoidea
- Family: Erebidae
- Subfamily: Arctiinae
- Tribe: Lithosiini
- Genus: Turlinia; Toulgoët, 1976
- Species: T. phalaenoides

Binomial name
- Turlinia phalaenoides Toulgoët, 1976

Genus of moths

Turlinia is a monotypic moth genus in the subfamily Arctiinae. Its single species, Turlinia phalaenoides, is found on Madagascar. Both the genus and authority were first described by Hervé de Toulgoët in 1976.
