= Regobarrosia flavescens =

Scientific classification
- Kingdom: Animalia
- Phylum: Arthropoda
- Class: Insecta
- Order: Lepidoptera
- Superfamily: Noctuoidea
- Family: Erebidae
- Subfamily: Arctiinae
- Genus: Regobarrosia
- Species: R. flavescens

Binomial name
- Regobarrosia flavescens (Walker, 1856)

Synonyms
- Halysidota flavescens Walker, 1856; Automolis asara H. Druce, 1883

Species of moth

Regobarrosia flavescens is a moth in the family Erebidae. It was described by Francis Walker in 1856. It is found in French Guiana, Brazil, Amazonas, Ecuador and Bolivia.
