= Toulgoetodes =

Scientific classification
- Domain: Eukaryota
- Kingdom: Animalia
- Phylum: Arthropoda
- Class: Insecta
- Order: Lepidoptera
- Family: Crambidae
- Subfamily: Scopariinae
- Genus: Toulgoetodes; Leraut, 1988

Genus of moths

Toulgoetodes is a genus of moths of the family Crambidae.

== Species ==
- Toulgoetodes boudinoti Leraut, 1988
- Toulgoetodes pallida Leraut, 1988
- Toulgoetodes tersella (Zeller, 1872)
- Toulgoetodes toulgoeti Leraut, 1988
