= Hypomolis aldaba =

Scientific classification
- Kingdom: Animalia
- Phylum: Arthropoda
- Class: Insecta
- Order: Lepidoptera
- Superfamily: Noctuoidea
- Family: Erebidae
- Subfamily: Arctiinae
- Genus: Hypomolis
- Species: H. aldaba

Binomial name
- Hypomolis aldaba (Dognin, 1894)

Synonyms
- Rosema aldaba Dognin, 1894; Diacrisia aldaba

Species of moth

Hypomolis aldaba is a moth of the family Erebidae. It was described by Paul Dognin in 1894. It is found in Ecuador.
