= Toulgoetodes tersella =

Scientific classification
- Kingdom: Animalia
- Phylum: Arthropoda
- Clade: Pancrustacea
- Class: Insecta
- Order: Lepidoptera
- Family: Crambidae
- Genus: Toulgoetodes
- Species: T. tersella

Binomial name
- Toulgoetodes tersella (Zeller, 1872)

Synonyms
- Scoparia tersella Zeller, 1872

Species of moth

Toulgoetodes tersella is a moth in the family Crambidae. It was described by Zeller in 1872. It is found in Colombia.
