= Micralarctia toulgoeti =

Scientific classification
- Kingdom: Animalia
- Phylum: Arthropoda
- Clade: Pancrustacea
- Class: Insecta
- Order: Lepidoptera
- Superfamily: Noctuoidea
- Family: Erebidae
- Subfamily: Arctiinae
- Genus: Micralarctia
- Species: M. toulgoeti

Binomial name
- Micralarctia toulgoeti Watson, 1988

Species of moth

Micralarctia toulgoeti is a moth of the family Erebidae. It was described by Allan Watson in 1988. It is found in Somalia.
