= Eupithecia toulgoeti =

Scientific classification
- Domain: Eukaryota
- Kingdom: Animalia
- Phylum: Arthropoda
- Class: Insecta
- Order: Lepidoptera
- Family: Geometridae
- Genus: Eupithecia
- Species: E. toulgoeti

Binomial name
- Eupithecia toulgoeti Herbulot, 1993

Species of moth

Eupithecia toulgoeti is a moth in the family Geometridae. It is found in the high Andes of Ecuador.
