= Hervé de Toulgoët =

French entomologist (1911–2009)

Hervé de Toulgoët (28 March 1911 – 14 September 2009) was a French entomologist. He specialised in moths of the families Arctiidae and Zygaenidae. He also studied the beetle genus Carabus. He was written about by Paul Thiaucourt and Jocelyne Navatte.

According to Navatte's note, Toulgoët published 179 works. On the genus Carabus, he published a catalogue of the types of the Paris National Museum of Natural History collection. On the Zygaenidae he published a note on some Moroccan species. His other works are mainly on Arctiidae.

== Taxa ==
Hervé de Toulgoët described 432 new species, and the following 31 genera:

- Afroarctia Toulgoët, 1978
- Agaltara Toulgoët, 1979
- Alepista Toulgoët, 1976
- Astacosia Toulgoët, 1958
- Axiopaenella Toulgoët, 1956
- Bryonola Toulgoët, 1955
- Coiffaitarctia Toulgoët, 1990
- Cristulosia Toulgoët, 1958
- Disparctia Toulgoët, 1978
- Ennomomima Toulgoët, 1990 (Note: Now considered synonymous to Zatrephes.)
- Eucyanoides Toulgoët, 1988
- Exilisia Toulgoët, 1958
- Galtarodes Toulgoët, 1980
- Kiriakoffalia Toulgoët, 1978
- Kiriakoffia Toulgoët, 1978
- Lalanneia Toulgoët, 1989
- Metexilisia Toulgoët, 1958
- Mimulosia Toulgoët, 1958
- Novosia Toulgoët, 1958
- Parexilisia Toulgoët, 1958
- Paulianosia Toulgoët, 1958
- Praemastus Toulgoët, 1991
- Proxhyle Toulgoët, 1959
- Pseudamastus Toulgoët, 1985
- Pseudogaltara Toulgoët, 1979
- Senecauxia Toulgoët, 1989
- Spatulosia Toulgoët, 1965
- Turlinia Toulgoët, 1976
- Venedictoffia Toulgoët, 1977
- Viettesia Toulgoët, 1959
- Watsonidia Toulgoët, 1981

Many taxa have also been named in honour of Toulgoët:

- Anticleora toulgoeti Viette, 1979
- Blechroneromia toulgoeti Viette, 1976
- Boloria aquilonaris toulgoeti Crosson du Cormier & Guérin, 1959
- Carabus toulgoeti Deuve, 1989
- Cabera toulgoeti Herbulot, 1956
- Cargolia toulgoeti Herbulot, 1988
- Chorenta toulgoeti Dalens, Touroult & tavakilian, 2010
- Chrysochroa toulgoeti Descarpentries, 1982
- Clemensia toulgoeti Gibeaux, 1983
- Cleora toulgoetae Herbulot, 1961
- Coscinia toulgoeti Rungs, 1957
- Cyclocephala toulgoeti Dechambre, 1992
- Detoulgoetia Dubatolov, 2006
- Digama sagittata toulgoeti Viette, 1970
- Echeta toulgoeti Navatte, 2005
- Ethioterpia toulgoeti Viette, 1961
- Eucamptognathus toulgoeti Deuve, 1986
- Eucyane toulgoetae Gibeaux, 1982
- Eupithecia toulgoeti Herbulot, 1993
- Fodina toulgoeti Viette, 1979
- Formozotroctes toulgoeti Tavakilian & Néouze, 2007
- Goniotropis toulgoeti Deuve, 2005
- Gymnogramma toulgoeti Gibeaux, 1982
- Homoeocera toulgoeti Lesieur, 1984
- Lemairegisa toulgoeti Thiaucourt, 1987
- Maliattha toulgoeti Viette, 1965
- Mallocampa toulgoeti Rougeot, 1977
- Micralarctia toulgoeti Watson, 1988
- Neothysanis toulgoeti Herbulot, 1993
- Odontoptera toulgoeti Bourgoin & O'Brien, 1994
- Olepa toulgoeti Ohrant, 1986
- Pachyteles toulgoeti Deuve, 2005
- Paracles toulgoeti Watson & Goodger, 1986
- Pheia toulgoeti Cerda, 2008
- Phileurus toulgoeti Dechambre, 1996
- Pseudautomeris toulgoeti Lemaire, 2002
- Ptenomela toulgoeti Soula, 2002
- Rifargia toulgoeti Thiaucourt, 1980
- Schausiella toulgoeti Lemaire, 1969
- Synalamis toulgoeti Lalanne-Cassou, 1992
- Toulgarctia Dubatolov et Haynes, 2008
- Toulgoetia Herbulot, 1946
- Toulgoetodes Leraut, 1988
- Toulgoetodes toulgoeti Herbulot, 1988
- Zamarada toulgoeti Herbulot, 1979
