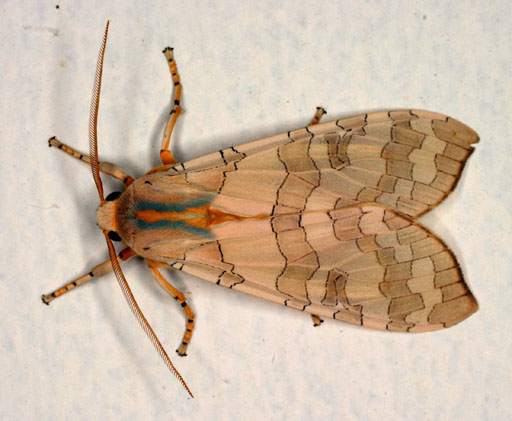
- Pale tiger moth (Halysidota tessellaris)

Scientific classification
- Kingdom: Animalia
- Phylum: Arthropoda
- Clade: Pancrustacea
- Class: Insecta
- Order: Lepidoptera
- Superfamily: Noctuoidea
- Family: Erebidae
- Subfamily: Arctiinae
- Tribe: Arctiini
- Subtribe: Phaegopterina; Kirby, 1892

= Phaegopterina =

Subtribe of moths

The Phaegopterina are a subtribe of tiger moths in the tribe Arctiini, which is part of the family Erebidae. The subtribe was described by William Forsell Kirby in 1892. 469 species of Phaegopterina are present and 52 that are recently discovered in Brazil.

== Taxonomic history ==
The subtribe was previously classified as the tribe Phaegopterini of the family Arctiidae.

In 2002, Jacobson & Weller proposed a clade Euchaetes within Arctiini. In 2010, V. V. Dubatolov proposed that this clade should be classified as subtribe Euchaetina, containing eight arctiini genera, including Euchaetes. However, the name Euchaetina does not appear in the comprehensive 2010 checklist assembled by J. Donald Lafontaine and B. Christian Schmidt, nor its later updated versions, which place those genera under Phaegopterina.

== Genera ==
The following genera are included in the subtribe. Numerous arctiine genera have not yet been assigned to a subtribe, so this genus list may be incomplete.

- Aemilia
- Agaraea
- Amastus
- Amaxia
- Ammalo
- Anaxita
- Amphelarctia
- Aphyarctia
- Aphyle
- Apiconoma
- Apocrisias
- Apyre
- Araeomolis
- Arctagyrta
- Arctiarpia
- Astralarctia
- Azatrephes
- Baritius
- Bernathonomus
- Bertholdia
- Biturix
- Calidota
- Carales
- Carathis
- Castrica
- Cissura
- Coiffaitarctia
- Cratoplastis
- Cresera
- Cycnia
- Demolis
- Dialeucias
- Diaphanophora
- Disconeura
- Echeta
- Ectypia
- Elysius
- Emurena
- Epicrisias
- Epimolis
- Eriostepta
- Ernassa
- Euchaetes
- Eucyrta
- Euerythra (formerly in Arctiina)
- Eupseudosoma
- Evius
- Fasslia
- Glaucostola
- Gonotrephes
- Gorgonidia
- Graphea
- Haemanota
- Haemaphlebiella
- Halysidota
- Haplonerita
- Hemihyalea (may belong in Amastus)
- Himerarctia
- Hyalarctia
- Hyperandra
- Hyperthaema
- Hypidalia
- Hypidota
- Hypocrisias
- Hyponerita
- Idalus
- Ischnocampa
- Ischnognatha
- Kodiosoma (formerly in Arctiina)
- Laguerreia (tentatively placed here)
- Lalanneia (tentatively placed here)
- Lampruna
- Lepidojulia
- Lepidokirbyia
- Lepidolutzia
- Lepidozikania
- Lepypiranga
- Lerina (tentatively placed here)
- Leucanopsis
- Lophocampa
- Machadoia
- Machaeraptenus
- Mazaeras
- Melanarctia
- Melese
- Mellamastus
- Metacrisia
- Metaxanthia
- Munona
- Nannodota
- Neidalia
- Neonerita
- Neoplynes
- Neozatrephes
- Nezula
- Nyearctia
- Ochrodota
- Onythes
- Opharus
- Ordishia
- Ormetica
- Pachydota
- Pagara
- Parathyris
- Pareuchaetes
- Parevia
- Pelochyta
- Phaegoptera
- Phaeomolis
- Pitane
- Pithea
- Premolis
- Pryteria
- Pseudamastus
- Pseudapistosia
- Pseudepimolis
- Pseudischnocampa
- Pseudohemihyalea (formerly in Hemihyalea)
- Pseudopharus
- Pseudotessellarctia
- Psychophasma
- Purius
- Pydnaodes
- Pygarctia
- Pygoctenucha
- Regobarrosia
- Rhipha
- Robinsonia
- Romualdia
- Scaptius
- Schalotomis
- Selenarctia
- Senecauxia (tentatively placed here)
- Soritena
- Stidzaeras
- Sutonocrea
- Sychesia
- Symphlebia
- Syntomostola
- Tessella
- Tessellarctia
- Tessellota
- Thyromolis
- Thysanoprymna
- Trichromia
- Tricypha
- Trocodima
- Turuptiana
- Viviennea
- Wanderbiltia
- Watsonidia
- Xanthoarctia
- Xanthophaeina
- Zaevius
- Zatrephes
