= Pseudapistosia leucocorypha =

Scientific classification
- Domain: Eukaryota
- Kingdom: Animalia
- Phylum: Arthropoda
- Class: Insecta
- Order: Lepidoptera
- Superfamily: Noctuoidea
- Family: Erebidae
- Subfamily: Arctiinae
- Genus: Pseudapistosia
- Species: P. leucocorypha

Binomial name
- Pseudapistosia leucocorypha Dognin, 1914

Synonyms
- Calidota leucocorypha Dognin, 1914

Species of moth

Pseudapistosia leucocorypha is a moth in the family Erebidae. It was described by Paul Dognin in 1914. It is found in Peru.
