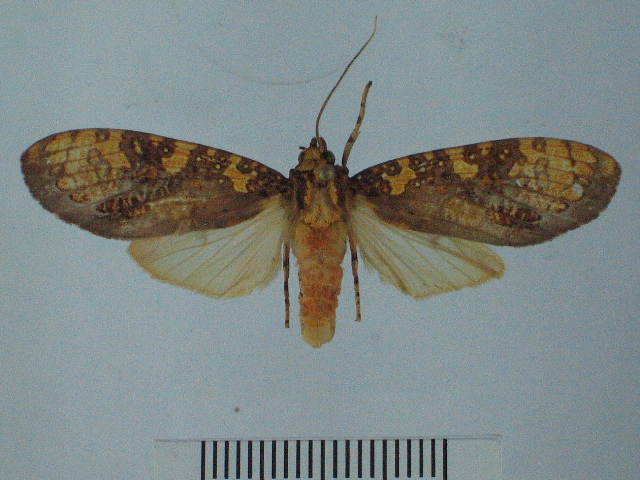

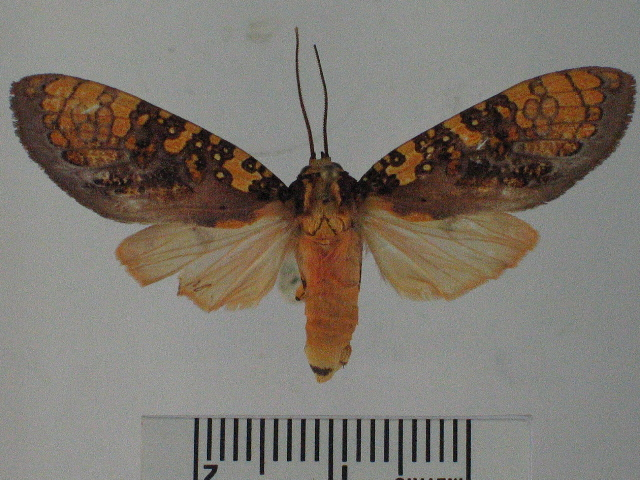

Scientific classification
- Domain: Eukaryota
- Kingdom: Animalia
- Phylum: Arthropoda
- Class: Insecta
- Order: Lepidoptera
- Superfamily: Noctuoidea
- Family: Erebidae
- Subfamily: Arctiinae
- Genus: Cresera
- Species: C. annulata

Binomial name
- Cresera annulata Schaus, 1894

= Cresera annulata =

Species of moth

Cresera annulata is a moth of the family Erebidae first described by William Schaus in 1894. It is found in Brazil, Bolivia, Costa Rica and Panama.
