= Tessellarctia =

Scientific classification
- Kingdom: Animalia
- Phylum: Arthropoda
- Class: Insecta
- Order: Lepidoptera
- Superfamily: Noctuoidea
- Family: Erebidae
- Subfamily: Arctiinae
- Subtribe: Phaegopterina
- Genus: Tessellarctia; Hampson, 1901

Synonyms
- Tesselarctia

Genus of moths

Tessellarctia is a genus of moths in the family Erebidae.

== Species ==
- Tessellarctia semivaria Walker, 1856
- Tessellarctia walterei Beutelspacher, 1984
