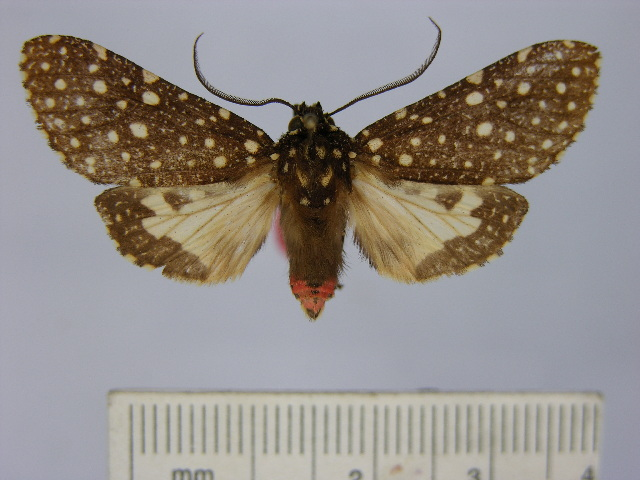

Scientific classification
- Domain: Eukaryota
- Kingdom: Animalia
- Phylum: Arthropoda
- Class: Insecta
- Order: Lepidoptera
- Superfamily: Noctuoidea
- Family: Erebidae
- Subfamily: Arctiinae
- Genus: Bernathonomus
- Species: B. aureopuncta

Binomial name
- Bernathonomus aureopuncta (Rothschild, 1916)

Synonyms
- Opharus aureopuncta Rothschild, 1916

= Bernathonomus aureopuncta =

Species of moth

Bernathonomus aureopuncta is a moth of the family Erebidae. It is found in Colombia, Ecuador, Bolivia, Costa Rica and Panama.
