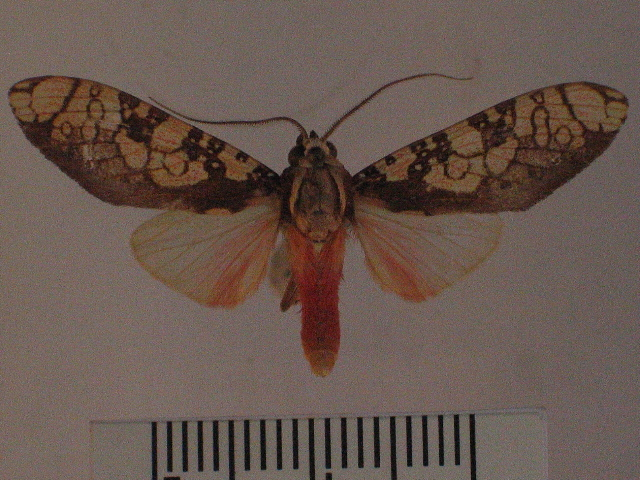

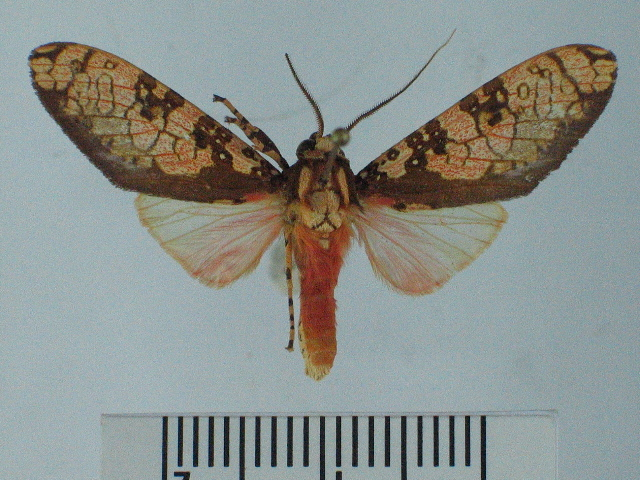

Scientific classification
- Domain: Eukaryota
- Kingdom: Animalia
- Phylum: Arthropoda
- Class: Insecta
- Order: Lepidoptera
- Superfamily: Noctuoidea
- Family: Erebidae
- Subfamily: Arctiinae
- Genus: Cresera
- Species: C. ilioides

Binomial name
- Cresera ilioides (Schaus, 1905)

Synonyms
- Automolis ilioides Schaus, 1905

= Cresera ilioides =

Species of moth

Cresera ilioides is a moth of the family Erebidae first described by William Schaus in 1905. It is found in French Guiana, Guyana, Venezuela, Peru and Bolivia.
