= Machaeraptenus =

Scientific classification
- Domain: Eukaryota
- Kingdom: Animalia
- Phylum: Arthropoda
- Class: Insecta
- Order: Lepidoptera
- Superfamily: Noctuoidea
- Family: Erebidae
- Subfamily: Arctiinae
- Subtribe: Phaegopterina
- Genus: Machaeraptenus; Schaus, 1894

Genus of moths

Machaeraptenus is a genus of moths in the family Erebidae. The genus was erected by William Schaus in 1894.

== Species ==
- Machaeraptenus crocopera (Schaus, 1905)
- Machaeraptenus ventralis Schaus, 1894
- Machaeraptenus yepezi Toulgoët & Watson, [1985]
