= Pseudapistosia similis =

Scientific classification
- Kingdom: Animalia
- Phylum: Arthropoda
- Class: Insecta
- Order: Lepidoptera
- Superfamily: Noctuoidea
- Family: Erebidae
- Subfamily: Arctiinae
- Genus: Pseudapistosia
- Species: P. similis

Binomial name
- Pseudapistosia similis Hampson, 1901

Synonyms
- Calidota similis Hampson, 1901

Species of moth

Pseudapistosia similis is a moth in the family Erebidae. It was described by George Hampson in 1901. It is found in Bolivia.
