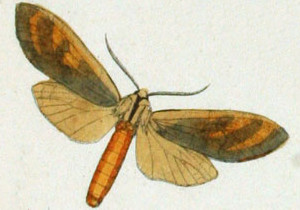

Scientific classification
- Domain: Eukaryota
- Kingdom: Animalia
- Phylum: Arthropoda
- Class: Insecta
- Order: Lepidoptera
- Superfamily: Noctuoidea
- Family: Erebidae
- Subfamily: Arctiinae
- Genus: Romualdia
- Species: R. elongata

Binomial name
- Romualdia elongata (Felder & Rogenhofer, 1874)

Synonyms
- Lophocampa elongata Felder, 1874; Amastus elongata

= Romualdia elongata =

Species of moth

Romualdia elongata is a moth in the family Erebidae first described by Felder and Rogenhofer in 1874. It is found in French Guiana and Brazil.
