= Sychesia melini =

Scientific classification
- Kingdom: Animalia
- Phylum: Arthropoda
- Class: Insecta
- Order: Lepidoptera
- Superfamily: Noctuoidea
- Family: Erebidae
- Subfamily: Arctiinae
- Genus: Sychesia
- Species: S. melini

Binomial name
- Sychesia melini Bryk, 1953

Species of moth

Sychesia melini is a moth in the family Erebidae. It was described by Felix Bryk in 1953. It is found in Brazil.
