= Machaeraptenus yepezi =

Scientific classification
- Kingdom: Animalia
- Phylum: Arthropoda
- Class: Insecta
- Order: Lepidoptera
- Superfamily: Noctuoidea
- Family: Erebidae
- Subfamily: Arctiinae
- Genus: Machaeraptenus
- Species: M. yepezi

Binomial name
- Machaeraptenus yepezi Toulgoët, 1984

Species of moth

Machaeraptenus yepezi is a moth of the family Erebidae first described by Hervé de Toulgoët in 1984. It is found in Venezuela.
