= Sychesia =

Scientific classification
- Domain: Eukaryota
- Kingdom: Animalia
- Phylum: Arthropoda
- Class: Insecta
- Order: Lepidoptera
- Superfamily: Noctuoidea
- Family: Erebidae
- Subfamily: Arctiinae
- Subtribe: Phaegopterina
- Genus: Sychesia; Möschler, 1878

Genus of moths

Sychesia is a genus of moths in the family Erebidae.

== Species ==
- Sychesia coccina Jordan, 1916
- Sychesia dimidiata Jordan, 1916
- Sychesia dryas Cramer, 1775
- Sychesia erubescens Jordan, 1916
- Sychesia hora Jordan, 1916
- Sychesia melini Bryk, 1953
- Sychesia naias Jordan, 1916
- Sychesia omissus Rothschild, 1910
- Sychesia pseudodryas Rothschild, 1909
- Sychesia subtilis Butler, 1878
- Sychesia terranea Rothschild, 1909
