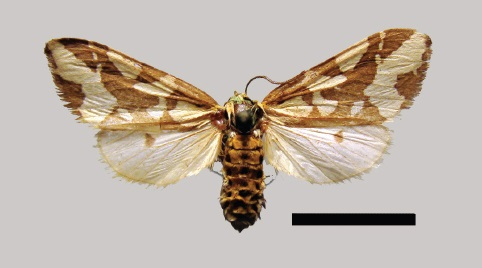

Scientific classification
- Domain: Eukaryota
- Kingdom: Animalia
- Phylum: Arthropoda
- Class: Insecta
- Order: Lepidoptera
- Superfamily: Noctuoidea
- Family: Erebidae
- Subfamily: Arctiinae
- Genus: Tessellota
- Species: T. cancellata

Binomial name
- Tessellota cancellata (Burmeister, 1878)

Synonyms
- Halysidota cancellata Burmeister, 1878

= Tessellota cancellata =

Species of moth

Tessellota cancellata is a moth in the family Erebidae. It was described by Hermann Burmeister in 1878. It is found in Argentina and Paraguay.
