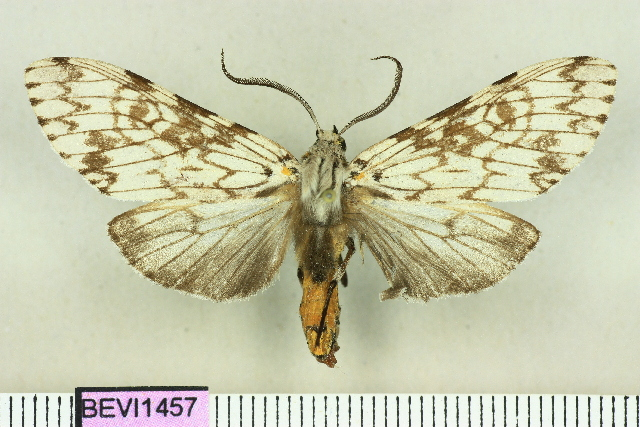

Scientific classification
- Domain: Eukaryota
- Kingdom: Animalia
- Phylum: Arthropoda
- Class: Insecta
- Order: Lepidoptera
- Superfamily: Noctuoidea
- Family: Erebidae
- Subfamily: Arctiinae
- Genus: Lepidozikania
- Species: L. similis

Binomial name
- Lepidozikania similis Travassos, 1949

= Lepidozikania similis =

Species of moth

Lepidozikania similis is a moth of the family Erebidae first described by Travassos in 1949. It is found in Brazil.
