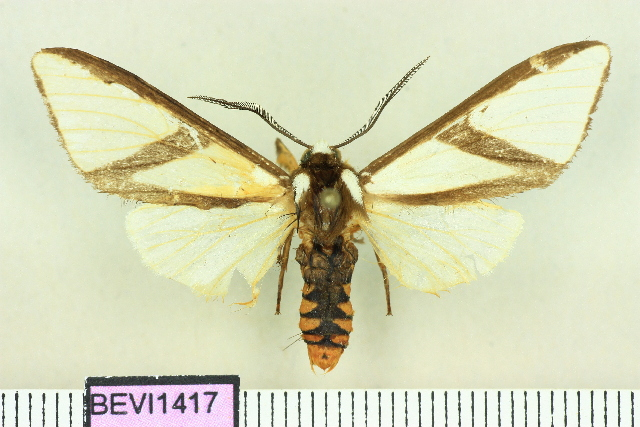

Scientific classification
- Domain: Eukaryota
- Kingdom: Animalia
- Phylum: Arthropoda
- Class: Insecta
- Order: Lepidoptera
- Superfamily: Noctuoidea
- Family: Erebidae
- Subfamily: Arctiinae
- Genus: Turuptiana
- Species: T. affinis

Binomial name
- Turuptiana affinis Rothschild, 1909

= Turuptiana affinis =

Species of moth

Turuptiana affinis is a moth in the family Erebidae. It was described by Walter Rothschild in 1909. It is found in Venezuela and Peru.
