= Metacrisia woolfsonae =

Scientific classification
- Kingdom: Animalia
- Phylum: Arthropoda
- Class: Insecta
- Order: Lepidoptera
- Superfamily: Noctuoidea
- Family: Erebidae
- Subfamily: Arctiinae
- Genus: Metacrisia
- Species: M. woolfsonae

Binomial name
- Metacrisia woolfsonae Toulgoët, 1988

Species of moth

Metacrisia woolfsonae is a moth of the family Erebidae first described by Hervé de Toulgoët in 1988. It is found in Ecuador.
