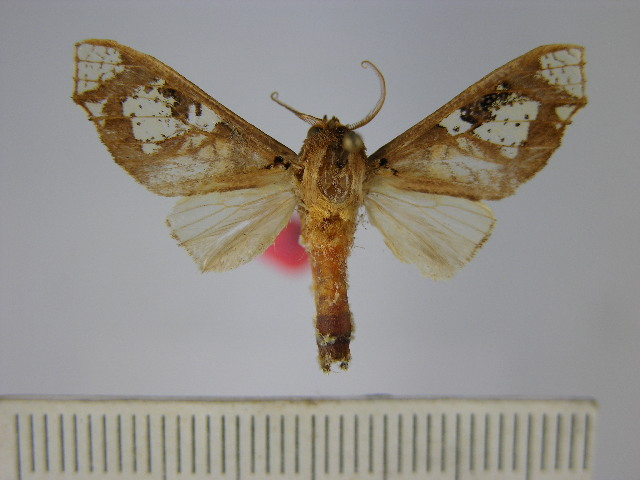

Scientific classification
- Kingdom: Animalia
- Phylum: Arthropoda
- Class: Insecta
- Order: Lepidoptera
- Superfamily: Noctuoidea
- Family: Erebidae
- Subfamily: Arctiinae
- Genus: Gonotrephes; Hampson, 1909
- Species: G. friga

Binomial name
- Gonotrephes friga (H. Druce, 1906)

Synonyms
- Thyrarctia friga H. Druce, 1906

= Gonotrephes =

Genus of moths

Gonotrephes is a monotypic moth genus erected by George Hampson in 1909 in subtribe Phaegopterina and family Erebidae. Its only species, Gonotrephes friga, was first described by Herbert Druce in 1909. It is found in Peru.
