= Cresera espiritosantensis =

Scientific classification
- Domain: Eukaryota
- Kingdom: Animalia
- Phylum: Arthropoda
- Class: Insecta
- Order: Lepidoptera
- Superfamily: Noctuoidea
- Family: Erebidae
- Subfamily: Arctiinae
- Genus: Cresera
- Species: C. espiritosantensis

Binomial name
- Cresera espiritosantensis Rego Barros, 1958

Species of insect

Cresera espiritosantensis is a moth of the family Erebidae. It was described by Rego Barros in 1958. It is found in southern Brazil.
