= Apyre =

Scientific classification
- Kingdom: Animalia
- Phylum: Arthropoda
- Class: Insecta
- Order: Lepidoptera
- Superfamily: Noctuoidea
- Family: Erebidae
- Subfamily: Arctiinae
- Tribe: Arctiini
- Subtribe: Phaegopterina
- Genus: Apyre; Walker, 1854

Genus of moths

Apyre is a genus of moths in the family Erebidae. It was described by Francis Walker in 1854.

== Species ==
- Apyre separata Walker, 1854
- Apyre lucia Pinas & Manzano, 2000
