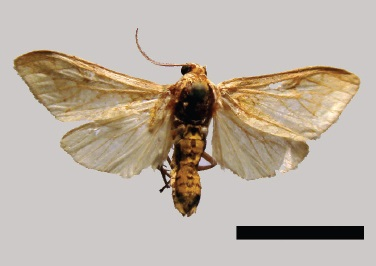

Scientific classification
- Kingdom: Animalia
- Phylum: Arthropoda
- Class: Insecta
- Order: Lepidoptera
- Superfamily: Noctuoidea
- Family: Erebidae
- Subfamily: Arctiinae
- Genus: Tessellota
- Species: T. trifasciata

Binomial name
- Tessellota trifasciata (Burmeister, 1878)

Synonyms
- Halysidota trifasciata Burmeister, 1878; Sellota trifasciata bruchi Breyer, 1957

= Tessellota trifasciata =

Species of moth

Tessellota trifasciata is a moth in the family Erebidae. It was described by Hermann Burmeister in 1878. It is found in Argentina and Bolivia.

== Subspecies ==
- Tessellota trifasciata trifasciata (Argentina)
- Tessellota trifasciata bruchi (Breyer, 1957)
