= Emurena tripunctata =

Scientific classification
- Domain: Eukaryota
- Kingdom: Animalia
- Phylum: Arthropoda
- Class: Insecta
- Order: Lepidoptera
- Superfamily: Noctuoidea
- Family: Erebidae
- Subfamily: Arctiinae
- Genus: Emurena
- Species: E. tripunctata

Binomial name
- Emurena tripunctata (H. Druce, 1884)

Synonyms
- Sutonocrea tripunctata H. Druce, 1884; Automolis tripunctata

Species of moth

Emurena tripunctata is a moth of the family Erebidae first described by Herbert Druce in 1884. It is found in Panama.
