= Hypidalia sanguirena =

Scientific classification
- Kingdom: Animalia
- Phylum: Arthropoda
- Clade: Pancrustacea
- Class: Insecta
- Order: Lepidoptera
- Superfamily: Noctuoidea
- Family: Erebidae
- Subfamily: Arctiinae
- Genus: Hypidalia
- Species: H. sanguirena

Binomial name
- Hypidalia sanguirena Schaus, 1905

Species of moth

Hypidalia sanguirena is a moth of the subfamily Arctiinae first described by William Schaus in 1905. It is found in Brazil, French Guiana, Venezuela, Ecuador and Bolivia.

== Subspecies ==
- Hypidalia sanguirena sanguirena (French Guiana)
- Hypidalia sanguirena rubrivena Rothschild, 1935 (Brazil)
