= Melanarctia =

Scientific classification
- Domain: Eukaryota
- Kingdom: Animalia
- Phylum: Arthropoda
- Class: Insecta
- Order: Lepidoptera
- Superfamily: Noctuoidea
- Family: Erebidae
- Subfamily: Arctiinae
- Subtribe: Phaegopterina
- Genus: Melanarctia; Watson, 1975

Genus of moths

Melanarctia is a genus of moths in the family Erebidae. The genus was described by Watson in 1975.

== Species ==
- Melanarctia lativitta (Rothschild, 1909)
- Melanarctia ockendeni (Rothschild, 1909)
