= Hypidalia =

Scientific classification
- Kingdom: Animalia
- Phylum: Arthropoda
- Class: Insecta
- Order: Lepidoptera
- Superfamily: Noctuoidea
- Family: Erebidae
- Subfamily: Arctiinae
- Tribe: Arctiini
- Subtribe: Phaegopterina
- Genus: Hypidalia; Hampson, 1901

Genus of moths

Hypidalia is a genus of moths in the family Erebidae erected by George Hampson in 1901.

== Species ==
- Hypidalia enervis
- Hypidalia luteoalba
- Hypidalia sanguirena
