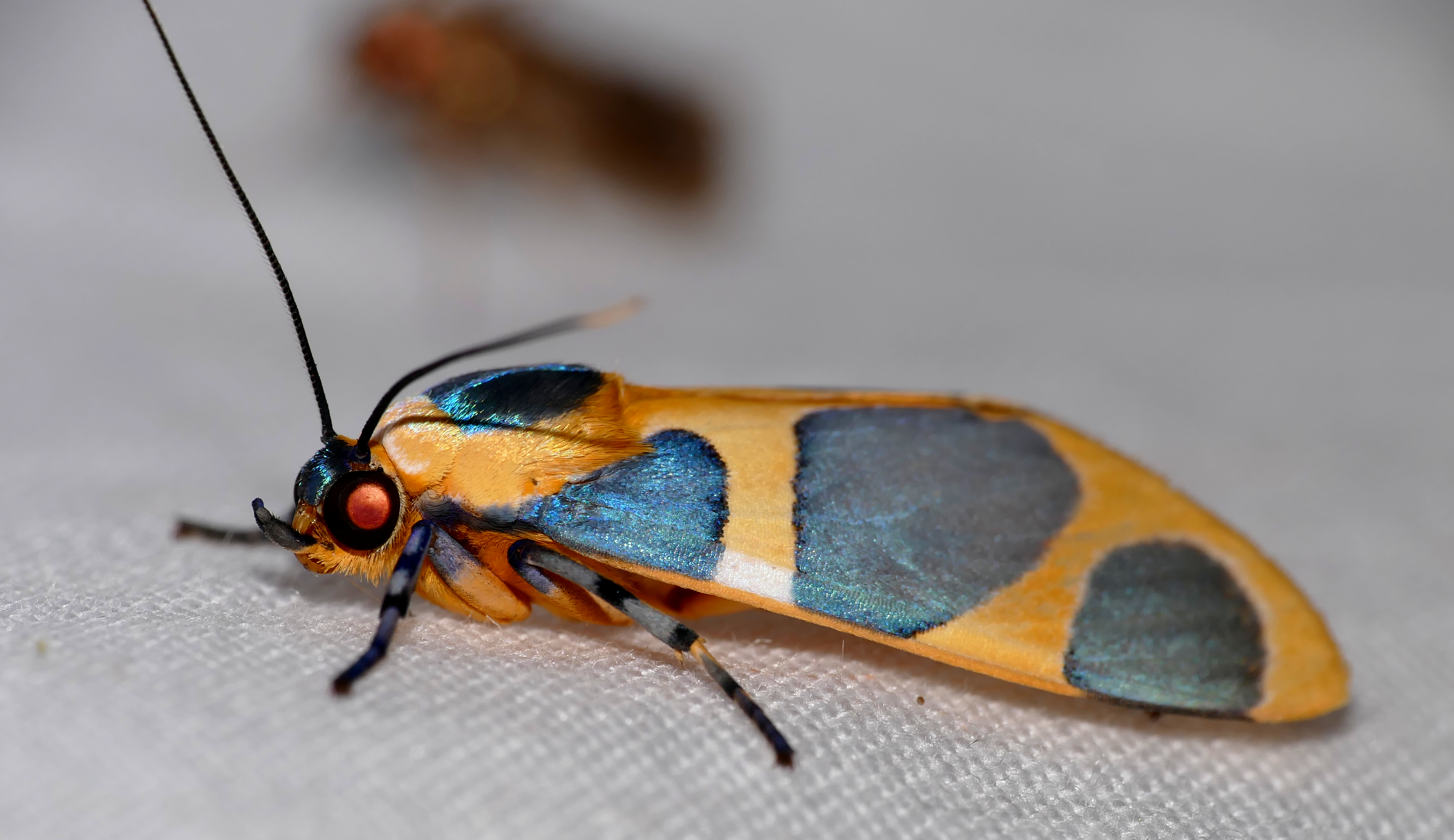

Scientific classification
- Domain: Eukaryota
- Kingdom: Animalia
- Phylum: Arthropoda
- Class: Insecta
- Order: Lepidoptera
- Superfamily: Noctuoidea
- Family: Erebidae
- Subfamily: Arctiinae
- Genus: Emurena
- Species: E. fernandezi

Binomial name
- Emurena fernandezi Watson, 1975

= Emurena fernandezi =

Species of moth

Emurena fernandezi is a moth of the family Erebidae first described by Allan Watson in 1975. It is found in Guyana.
