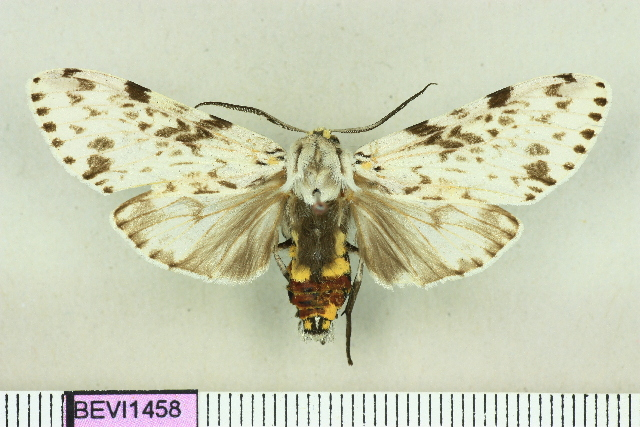

Scientific classification
- Domain: Eukaryota
- Kingdom: Animalia
- Phylum: Arthropoda
- Class: Insecta
- Order: Lepidoptera
- Superfamily: Noctuoidea
- Family: Erebidae
- Subfamily: Arctiinae
- Subtribe: Phaegopterina
- Genus: Lepidozikania; Travassos, 1949

= Lepidozikania =

Genus of moths

Lepidozikania is a genus of moths in the family Erebidae. The genus was described by Travassos in 1949.

== Species ==
- Lepidozikania cinerascens
- Lepidozikania similis
