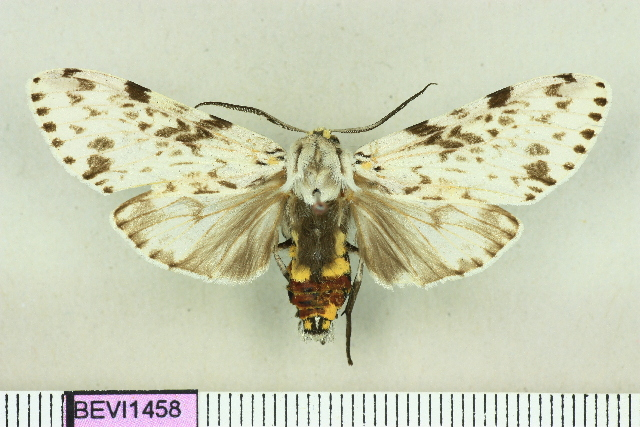

Scientific classification
- Kingdom: Animalia
- Phylum: Arthropoda
- Class: Insecta
- Order: Lepidoptera
- Superfamily: Noctuoidea
- Family: Erebidae
- Subfamily: Arctiinae
- Genus: Lepidozikania
- Species: L. cinerascens

Binomial name
- Lepidozikania cinerascens (Walker, 1855)

Synonyms
- Halesidota cinerascens Walker, 1855; Tesselarctia cinerascens

= Lepidozikania cinerascens =

Species of moth

Lepidozikania cinerascens is a moth of the family Erebidae first described by Francis Walker in 1855. It is found in Brazil.
