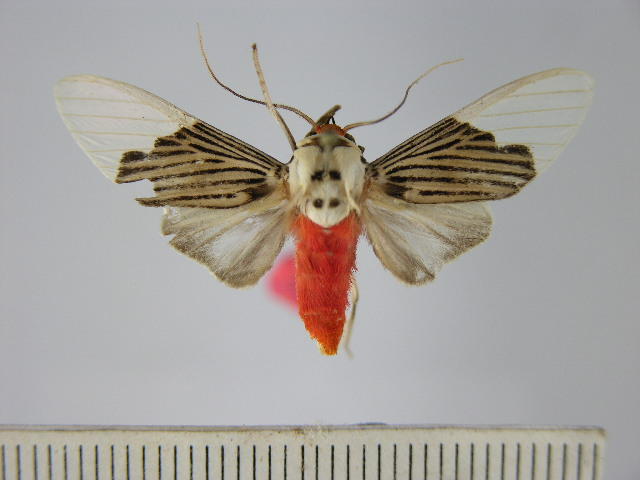

Scientific classification
- Domain: Eukaryota
- Kingdom: Animalia
- Phylum: Arthropoda
- Class: Insecta
- Order: Lepidoptera
- Superfamily: Noctuoidea
- Family: Erebidae
- Subfamily: Arctiinae
- Genus: Ischnognatha
- Species: I. leucapera

Binomial name
- Ischnognatha leucapera (Dognin, 1914)

Synonyms
- Automolis leucapera Dognin, 1914

= Ischnognatha leucapera =

Species of moth

Ischnognatha leucapera is a moth of the family Erebidae first described by Paul Dognin in 1914. It is found in Colombia.
