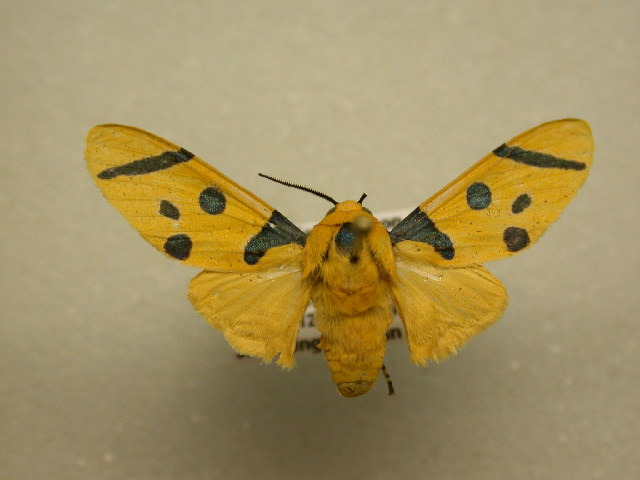

Scientific classification
- Domain: Eukaryota
- Kingdom: Animalia
- Phylum: Arthropoda
- Class: Insecta
- Order: Lepidoptera
- Superfamily: Noctuoidea
- Family: Erebidae
- Subfamily: Arctiinae
- Genus: Emurena
- Species: E. quinquepunctata

Binomial name
- Emurena quinquepunctata (Gaede, 1928)

Synonyms
- Automolis quinquepunctata Gaede, 1928; Automolis quinquepunctata Schaus, 1933 (preocc. Gaede, 1828)

= Emurena quinquepunctata =

Species of moth

Emurena quinquepunctata is a moth of the family Erebidae first described by Max Gaede in 1928. It is found in Colombia.
