= Machaeraptenus ventralis =

Scientific classification
- Domain: Eukaryota
- Kingdom: Animalia
- Phylum: Arthropoda
- Class: Insecta
- Order: Lepidoptera
- Superfamily: Noctuoidea
- Family: Erebidae
- Subfamily: Arctiinae
- Genus: Machaeraptenus
- Species: M. ventralis

Binomial name
- Machaeraptenus ventralis Schaus, 1894

Synonyms
- Automolis sordidipennis Rothschild, 1916

Species of moth

Machaeraptenus ventralis is a moth of the family Erebidae first described by William Schaus in 1894. It is found in Venezuela, French Guiana and Bolivia.
