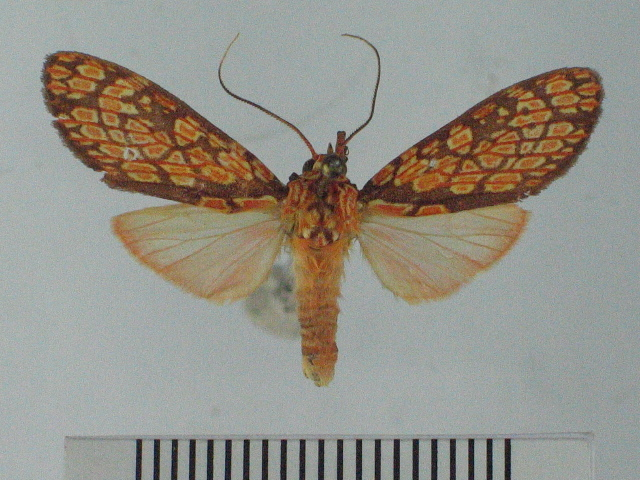
- Cresera affinis

Scientific classification
- Kingdom: Animalia
- Phylum: Arthropoda
- Clade: Pancrustacea
- Class: Insecta
- Order: Lepidoptera
- Superfamily: Noctuoidea
- Family: Erebidae
- Subfamily: Arctiinae
- Subtribe: Phaegopterina
- Genus: Cresera; Schaus, 1894

= Cresera =

Genus of moths

Cresera is a genus of moths in the family Erebidae. The genus was described by William Schaus in 1894.

== Species ==
- Cresera affinis (Rothschild, 1909)
- Cresera annulata Schaus, 1894
- Cresera espiritosantensis Rego Barros, 1958
- Cresera hieroglyphica (Schaus, 1905)
- Cresera ilioides (Schaus, 1905)
- Cresera ilus (Cramer, [1776])
- Cresera intensa (Rothschild, 1909)
- Cresera ockendeni (Rothschild, 1909)
- Cresera optima (Butler, 1877)
- Cresera silvestrii Travassos, 1956
- Cresera similis (Rothschild, 1909)
- Cresera tinguaensis Rego Barros, 1957
