= Onythes pallidicosta =

Scientific classification
- Kingdom: Animalia
- Phylum: Arthropoda
- Class: Insecta
- Order: Lepidoptera
- Superfamily: Noctuoidea
- Family: Erebidae
- Subfamily: Arctiinae
- Genus: Onythes
- Species: O. pallidicosta

Binomial name
- Onythes pallidicosta Walker, 1855

Species of moth

Onythes pallidicosta is a moth of the subfamily Arctiinae first described by Francis Walker in 1855. It is found in Venezuela, Bolivia and Peru.
