= Onythes flavicosta =

Scientific classification
- Domain: Eukaryota
- Kingdom: Animalia
- Phylum: Arthropoda
- Class: Insecta
- Order: Lepidoptera
- Superfamily: Noctuoidea
- Family: Erebidae
- Subfamily: Arctiinae
- Genus: Onythes
- Species: O. flavicosta

Binomial name
- Onythes flavicosta (H. Druce, 1905)

Synonyms
- Ischnocampa flavicosta H. Druce, 1905; Elysius flavicosta

Species of moth

Onythes flavicosta is a moth of the family Erebidae first described by Herbert Druce in 1905. It is found in Peru.
