= Onythes colombiana =

Scientific classification
- Domain: Eukaryota
- Kingdom: Animalia
- Phylum: Arthropoda
- Class: Insecta
- Order: Lepidoptera
- Superfamily: Noctuoidea
- Family: Erebidae
- Subfamily: Arctiinae
- Genus: Onythes
- Species: O. colombiana

Binomial name
- Onythes colombiana (Rothschild, 1911)

Synonyms
- Halysidota colombiana Rothschild, 1911; Elysius sarcochroa Dognin, 1912

Species of moth

Onythes colombiana is a moth of the family Erebidae first described by Walter Rothschild in 1911. It is found in Colombia.
