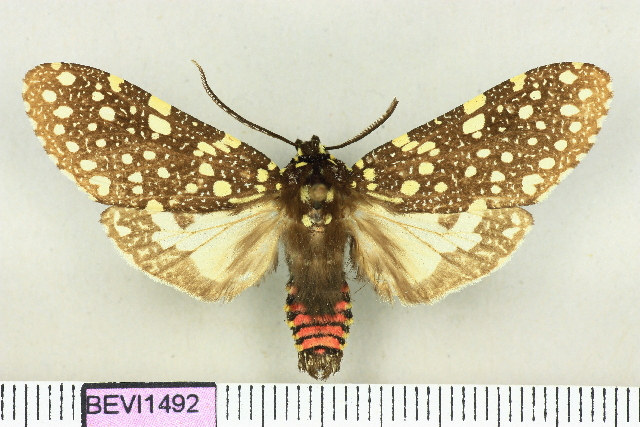

Scientific classification
- Domain: Eukaryota
- Kingdom: Animalia
- Phylum: Arthropoda
- Class: Insecta
- Order: Lepidoptera
- Superfamily: Noctuoidea
- Family: Erebidae
- Subfamily: Arctiinae
- Genus: Bernathonomus
- Species: B. piperita

Binomial name
- Bernathonomus piperita (Herrich-Schäffer, [1855])

Synonyms
- Phegoptera piperita Herrich-Schäffer, [1855]

= Bernathonomus piperita =

Species of moth

Bernathonomus piperita is a moth of the family Erebidae. It is found in Costa Rica, Panama and Brazil.
