= Cresera silvestrii =

Scientific classification
- Domain: Eukaryota
- Kingdom: Animalia
- Phylum: Arthropoda
- Class: Insecta
- Order: Lepidoptera
- Superfamily: Noctuoidea
- Family: Erebidae
- Subfamily: Arctiinae
- Genus: Cresera
- Species: C. silvestrii

Binomial name
- Cresera silvestrii Travassos, 1956

Species of moth

Cresera silvestrii is a moth of the family Erebidae. It was described by Travassos in 1956. It is found in Brazil.
