= Arctagyrta =

Scientific classification
- Kingdom: Animalia
- Phylum: Arthropoda
- Class: Insecta
- Order: Lepidoptera
- Superfamily: Noctuoidea
- Family: Erebidae
- Subfamily: Arctiinae
- Subtribe: Phaegopterina
- Genus: Arctagyrta; Hampson, 1901
- Species: A. nana

Binomial name
- Arctagyrta nana (Walker, 1856)

Synonyms
- Agyrta nana Walker, 1856

Genus of moths

Arctagyrta is a monotypic moth genus in the family Erebidae erected by George Hampson in 1901. Its single species, Arctagyrta nana, was first described by Francis Walker in 1856. It is found in the Brazilian state of Amazonas.
