= Pitane napravniki =

Scientific classification
- Domain: Eukaryota
- Kingdom: Animalia
- Phylum: Arthropoda
- Class: Insecta
- Order: Lepidoptera
- Superfamily: Noctuoidea
- Family: Erebidae
- Subfamily: Arctiinae
- Genus: Pitane
- Species: P. napravniki

Binomial name
- Pitane napravniki Grados, 2004

Species of moth

Pitane napravniki is a moth in the family Erebidae first described by Juan Grados in 2004. It is found in southern Peru.
