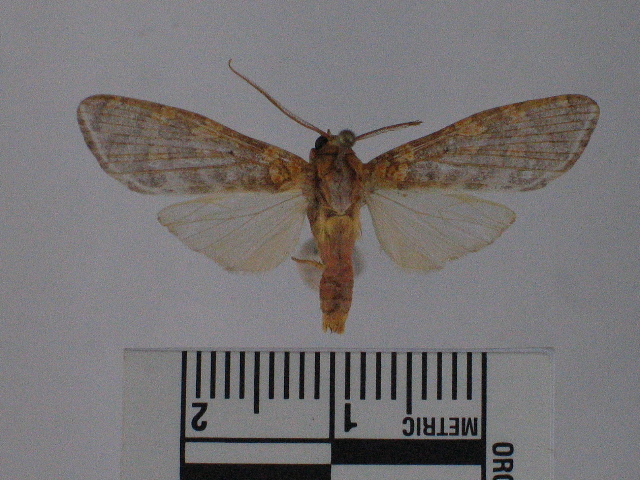
- Graphea pseudomarmorea

Scientific classification
- Domain: Eukaryota
- Kingdom: Animalia
- Phylum: Arthropoda
- Class: Insecta
- Order: Lepidoptera
- Superfamily: Noctuoidea
- Family: Erebidae
- Subfamily: Arctiinae
- Subtribe: Phaegopterina
- Genus: Graphea; Schaus, 1894

Type species
- Graphea marmorea Schaus, 1894

= Graphea =

Genus of moths

Graphea is a genus of moths in the family Erebidae. The genus was described by William Schaus in 1894.

== Species ==
- Graphea marmorea
- Graphea paramarmorea
- Graphea pseudomarmorea
