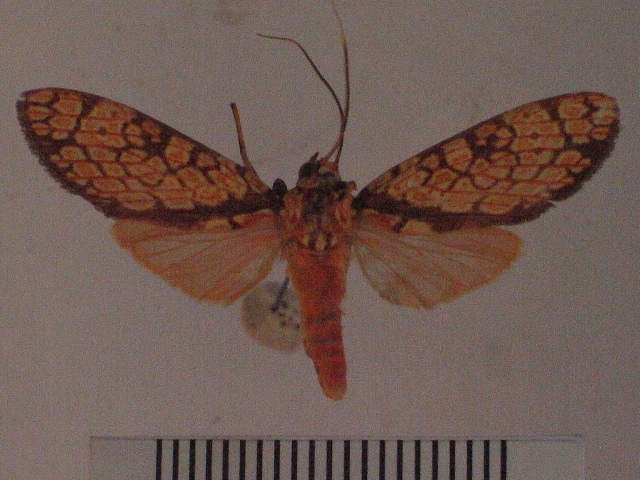

Scientific classification
- Kingdom: Animalia
- Phylum: Arthropoda
- Clade: Pancrustacea
- Class: Insecta
- Order: Lepidoptera
- Superfamily: Noctuoidea
- Family: Erebidae
- Subfamily: Arctiinae
- Genus: Cresera
- Species: C. optima

Binomial name
- Cresera optima (Butler, 1877)

Synonyms
- Elysius optimus Butler, 1877; Cresera optimus; Prumala simillima Rothschild, 1933; Cresera simillima; Cresera similina

= Cresera optima =

Species of moth

Cresera optima is a moth of the family Erebidae first described by Arthur Gardiner Butler in 1877. It is found in French Guiana, Guyana, Amazonas, Ecuador and Colombia.
