= Graphea paramarmorea =

Scientific classification
- Domain: Eukaryota
- Kingdom: Animalia
- Phylum: Arthropoda
- Class: Insecta
- Order: Lepidoptera
- Superfamily: Noctuoidea
- Family: Erebidae
- Subfamily: Arctiinae
- Genus: Graphea
- Species: G. paramarmorea

Binomial name
- Graphea paramarmorea Travassos, 1956

Species of moth

Graphea paramarmorea is a moth of the family Erebidae first described by Travassos in 1956. It is found in Brazil.
