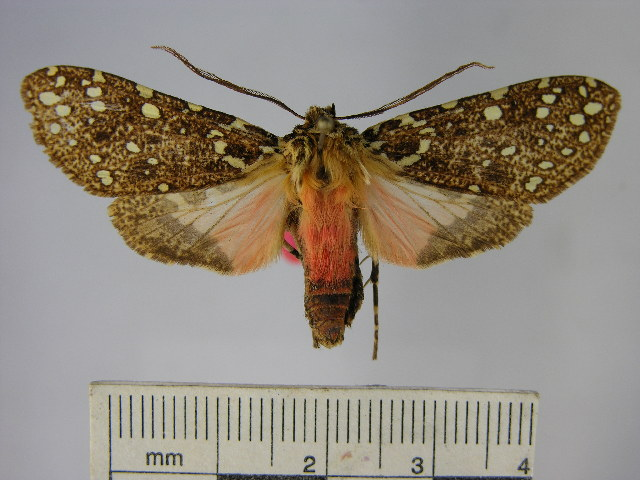

Scientific classification
- Kingdom: Animalia
- Phylum: Arthropoda
- Clade: Pancrustacea
- Class: Insecta
- Order: Lepidoptera
- Superfamily: Noctuoidea
- Family: Erebidae
- Subfamily: Arctiinae
- Genus: Bernathonomus
- Species: B. postrosea

Binomial name
- Bernathonomus postrosea Vincent, 2011

= Bernathonomus postrosea =

Species of moth

Bernathonomus postrosea is a moth of the family Erebidae. It is found in Peru.
