= Tessellota pura =

Scientific classification
- Kingdom: Animalia
- Phylum: Arthropoda
- Clade: Pancrustacea
- Class: Insecta
- Order: Lepidoptera
- Superfamily: Noctuoidea
- Family: Erebidae
- Subfamily: Arctiinae
- Genus: Tessellota
- Species: T. pura

Binomial name
- Tessellota pura Breyer, 1957

Species of moth

Tessellota pura is a moth in the family Erebidae. It was first described by A. Breyer in 1957. It is found in Argentina and Bolivia.
