= Syntomostola =

Scientific classification
- Domain: Eukaryota
- Kingdom: Animalia
- Phylum: Arthropoda
- Class: Insecta
- Order: Lepidoptera
- Superfamily: Noctuoidea
- Family: Erebidae
- Subfamily: Arctiinae
- Subtribe: Phaegopterina
- Genus: Syntomostola; Dognin, 1912

Genus of moths

Syntomostola is a genus of moths in the family Erebidae.

== Species ==
- Syntomostola semiflava Dognin, 1923
- Syntomostola xanthosoma Dognin, 1912
