= Dialeucias violascens =

Scientific classification
- Domain: Eukaryota
- Kingdom: Animalia
- Phylum: Arthropoda
- Class: Insecta
- Order: Lepidoptera
- Superfamily: Noctuoidea
- Family: Erebidae
- Subfamily: Arctiinae
- Genus: Dialeucias
- Species: D. violascens

Binomial name
- Dialeucias violascens Schaus, 1905

Species of moth

Dialeucias violascens is a moth of the family Erebidae first described by William Schaus in 1905. It is found in French Guiana and Ecuador.
