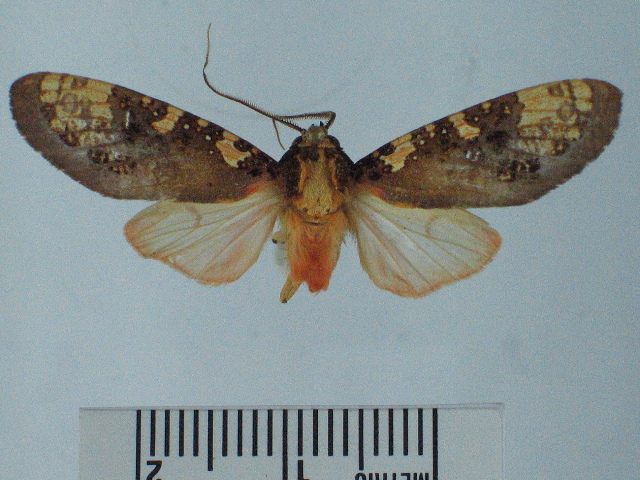

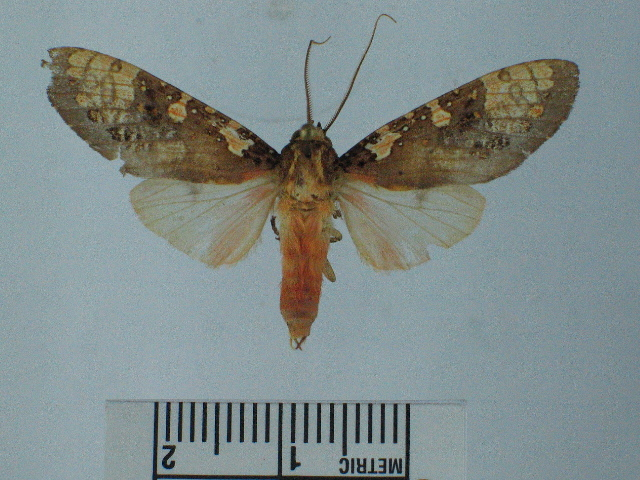

Scientific classification
- Domain: Eukaryota
- Kingdom: Animalia
- Phylum: Arthropoda
- Class: Insecta
- Order: Lepidoptera
- Superfamily: Noctuoidea
- Family: Erebidae
- Subfamily: Arctiinae
- Genus: Cresera
- Species: C. ilus

Binomial name
- Cresera ilus (Cramer, [1776])

Synonyms
- Phalaena ilus Cramer, [1776]; Prumala ilus

= Cresera ilus =

Species of moth

Cresera ilus is a moth of the family Erebidae first described by Pieter Cramer in 1776. It is found in French Guiana, Suriname, Guyana, Ecuador, Peru and the Brazilian state of Amazonas.
