= Metaxanthia vespiformis =

Scientific classification
- Domain: Eukaryota
- Kingdom: Animalia
- Phylum: Arthropoda
- Class: Insecta
- Order: Lepidoptera
- Superfamily: Noctuoidea
- Family: Erebidae
- Subfamily: Arctiinae
- Genus: Metaxanthia
- Species: M. vespiformis

Binomial name
- Metaxanthia vespiformis H. Druce, 1899

Synonyms
- Sciopsyche aurantiocauda Klages, 1906

Species of moth

Metaxanthia vespiformis is a moth of the family Erebidae first described by Herbert Druce in 1899. It is found in Brazil, Peru, Colombia, Ecuador, French Guiana, Guyana and Costa Rica.
