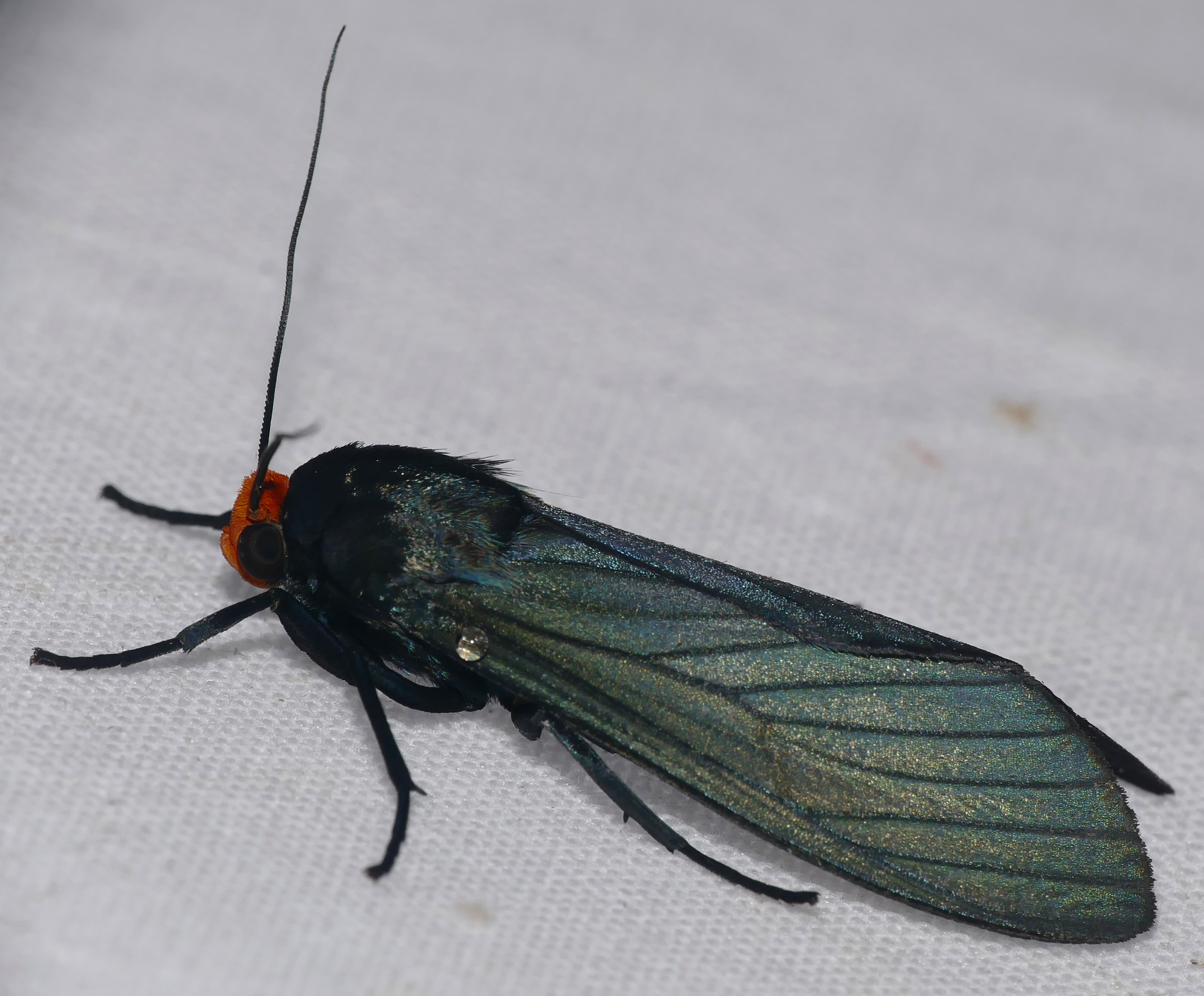
- Image of Machaeraptenus crocopera

Scientific classification
- Kingdom: Animalia
- Phylum: Arthropoda
- Class: Insecta
- Order: Lepidoptera
- Superfamily: Noctuoidea
- Family: Erebidae
- Subfamily: Arctiinae
- Genus: Machaeraptenus
- Species: M. crocopera

Binomial name
- Machaeraptenus crocopera (Schaus, 1905)

Synonyms
- Automolis crocopera Schaus, 1905

= Machaeraptenus crocopera =

Species of moth

Machaeraptenus crocopera is a moth of the family Erebidae first described by William Schaus in 1905. It is found in Guyana, French Guiana and Venezuela.
