= Palaeotype =

Scientific classification
- Kingdom: Animalia
- Phylum: Arthropoda
- Class: Insecta
- Order: Lepidoptera
- Superfamily: Noctuoidea
- Family: Erebidae
- Subfamily: Arctiinae
- Tribe: Lithosiini
- Genus: Palaeotype; Hampson, 1918
- Species: P. submarginata

Binomial name
- Palaeotype submarginata (Rothschild, 1915)

Synonyms
- Trischalis submarginata Rothschild, 1915

Genus of moths

Palaeotype is a monotypic moth genus in the family Erebidae erected by George Hampson in 1918. Its single species, Palaeotype submarginata, was first described by Walter Rothschild in 1915. It is found in Papua New Guinea.
