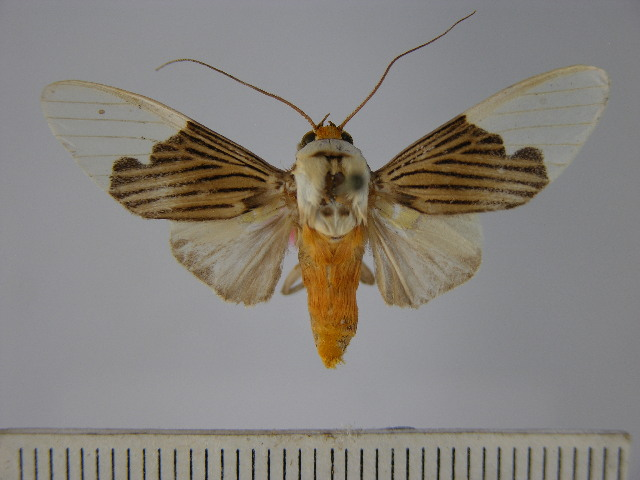

Scientific classification
- Domain: Eukaryota
- Kingdom: Animalia
- Phylum: Arthropoda
- Class: Insecta
- Order: Lepidoptera
- Superfamily: Noctuoidea
- Family: Erebidae
- Subfamily: Arctiinae
- Genus: Ischnognatha
- Species: I. semiopalina

Binomial name
- Ischnognatha semiopalina Felder, 1874

Synonyms
- Trichromia semiopalina; Automolis semiopalina

= Ischnognatha semiopalina =

Species of moth

Ischnognatha semiopalina is a moth of the family Erebidae first described by Felder in 1874. It is found in Nicaragua, Brazil and Guyana, French Guiana, Ecuador, Peru and Bolivia.
