= Neozatrephes telesilla =

Scientific classification
- Domain: Eukaryota
- Kingdom: Animalia
- Phylum: Arthropoda
- Class: Insecta
- Order: Lepidoptera
- Superfamily: Noctuoidea
- Family: Erebidae
- Subfamily: Arctiinae
- Genus: Neozatrephes
- Species: N. telesilla

Binomial name
- Neozatrephes telesilla H. Druce, 1893

Species of moth

Neozatrephes telesilla is a moth of the family Erebidae. It was described by Herbert Druce in 1893. It is found in Ecuador.
