= Hypidalia luteoalba =

Scientific classification
- Domain: Eukaryota
- Kingdom: Animalia
- Phylum: Arthropoda
- Class: Insecta
- Order: Lepidoptera
- Superfamily: Noctuoidea
- Family: Erebidae
- Subfamily: Arctiinae
- Genus: Hypidalia
- Species: H. luteoalba

Binomial name
- Hypidalia luteoalba Rothschild, 1935

Species of moth

Hypidalia luteoalba is a moth of the subfamily Arctiinae first described by Rothschild in 1935. It is found in Brazil.
