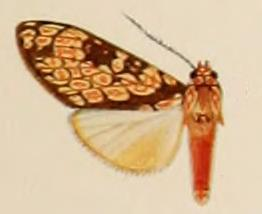

Scientific classification
- Domain: Eukaryota
- Kingdom: Animalia
- Phylum: Arthropoda
- Class: Insecta
- Order: Lepidoptera
- Superfamily: Noctuoidea
- Family: Erebidae
- Subfamily: Arctiinae
- Genus: Cresera
- Species: C. ockendeni

Binomial name
- Cresera ockendeni (Rothschild, 1909)

Synonyms
- Prumala ockendeni Rothschild, 1909

= Cresera ockendeni =

Species of moth

Cresera ockendeni is a moth of the family Erebidae first described by Walter Rothschild in 1909. It is found in Peru.
