= Diaphanophora albiscripta =

Scientific classification
- Domain: Eukaryota
- Kingdom: Animalia
- Phylum: Arthropoda
- Class: Insecta
- Order: Lepidoptera
- Superfamily: Noctuoidea
- Family: Erebidae
- Subfamily: Arctiinae
- Genus: Diaphanophora
- Species: D. albiscripta

Binomial name
- Diaphanophora albiscripta (Schaus, 1905)

Synonyms
- Evius albiscripta Schaus, 1905; Eriostepta albiscripta (Schaus, 1905)

Species of moth

Diaphanophora albiscripta is a moth of the family Erebidae. It was described by William Schaus in 1905. It is found in French Guiana.
