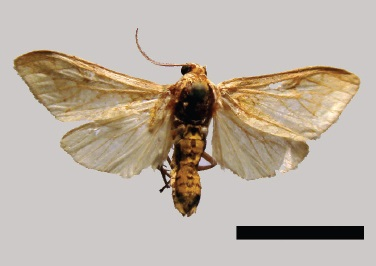
- Tessellota trifasciata

Scientific classification
- Kingdom: Animalia
- Phylum: Arthropoda
- Class: Insecta
- Order: Lepidoptera
- Superfamily: Noctuoidea
- Family: Erebidae
- Subfamily: Arctiinae
- Subtribe: Phaegopterina
- Genus: Tessellota; Hampson, 1901

Synonyms
- Sellota Breyer, 1957

= Tessellota =

Genus of moths

Tessellota is a genus of moths in the family Erebidae.

== Species ==
- Tessellota cancellata Burmeister, 1878
- Tessellota pura Breyer, 1957
- Tessellota trifasciata Burmeister, 1878
