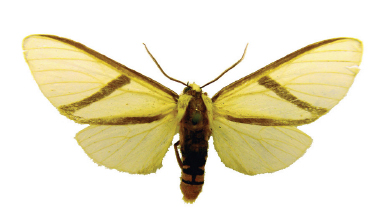

Scientific classification
- Kingdom: Animalia
- Phylum: Arthropoda
- Clade: Pancrustacea
- Class: Insecta
- Order: Lepidoptera
- Superfamily: Noctuoidea
- Family: Erebidae
- Subfamily: Arctiinae
- Genus: Turuptiana
- Species: T. obliqua

Binomial name
- Turuptiana obliqua Walker, 1869

Synonyms
- Sallaea ochrosterna Felder, 1874; Robinsonia perfecta H. Edwards, 1884

= Turuptiana obliqua =

Species of moth

Turuptiana obliqua is a moth in the family Erebidae. It was described by Francis Walker in 1869. It is found in Mexico, Costa Rica, and Panama.
