= Pitane (moth) =

Scientific classification
- Kingdom: Animalia
- Phylum: Arthropoda
- Class: Insecta
- Order: Lepidoptera
- Superfamily: Noctuoidea
- Family: Erebidae
- Subfamily: Arctiinae
- Subtribe: Phaegopterina
- Genus: Pitane; Walker, 1854

Genus of moths

Pitane is a genus of moths in the family Erebidae.

== Species ==
- Pitane fervens Walker, 1854
- Pitane napravniki Grados, 2004
