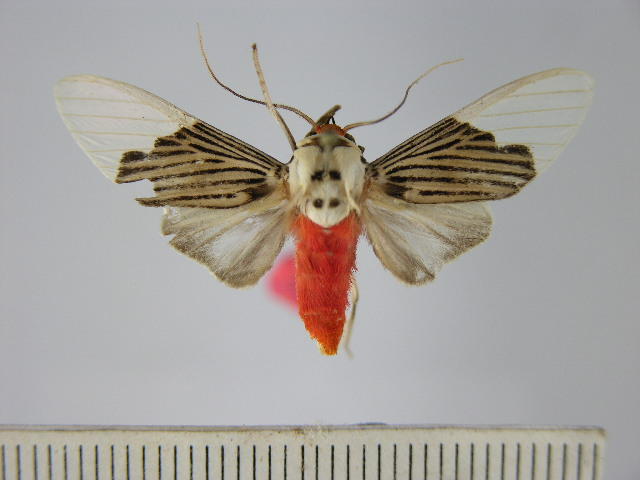
- Ischnognatha leucapera

Scientific classification
- Domain: Eukaryota
- Kingdom: Animalia
- Phylum: Arthropoda
- Class: Insecta
- Order: Lepidoptera
- Superfamily: Noctuoidea
- Family: Erebidae
- Subfamily: Arctiinae
- Subtribe: Phaegopterina
- Genus: Ischnognatha; Felder, 1874

= Ischnognatha =

Genus of moths

Ischnognatha is a genus of moths in the family Erebidae. The genus was described by Felder in 1874.

== Species ==
- Ischnognatha leucapera
- Ischnognatha semiopalina
