= Tessellarctia walterei =

Scientific classification
- Domain: Eukaryota
- Kingdom: Animalia
- Phylum: Arthropoda
- Class: Insecta
- Order: Lepidoptera
- Superfamily: Noctuoidea
- Family: Erebidae
- Subfamily: Arctiinae
- Genus: Tessellarctia
- Species: T. walterei

Binomial name
- Tessellarctia walterei Beutelspacher, 1984

Species of moth

Tessellarctia walterei is a moth in the family Erebidae. It was described by Carlos Rommel Beutelspacher in 1984. It is found in Mexico.
