= Bernathonomus ovuliger =

Scientific classification
- Domain: Eukaryota
- Kingdom: Animalia
- Phylum: Arthropoda
- Class: Insecta
- Order: Lepidoptera
- Superfamily: Noctuoidea
- Family: Erebidae
- Subfamily: Arctiinae
- Genus: Bernathonomus
- Species: B. ovuliger

Binomial name
- Bernathonomus ovuliger (Seitz, 1922)

Synonyms
- Opharus ovuliger Seitz, 1922

Species of moth

Bernathonomus ovuliger is a moth of the family Erebidae. It is found in Colombia.
