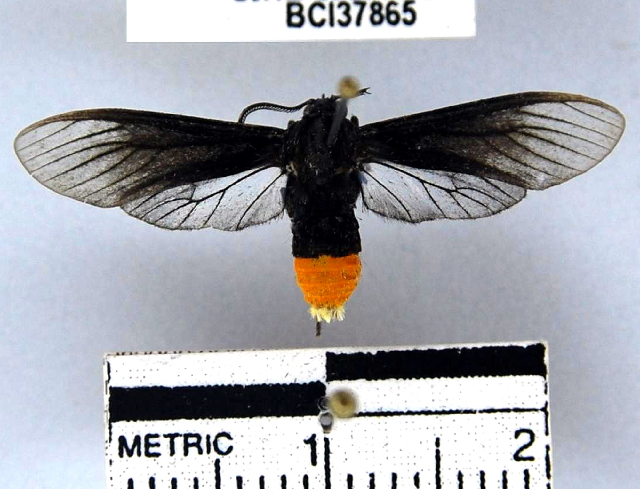

Scientific classification
- Domain: Eukaryota
- Kingdom: Animalia
- Phylum: Arthropoda
- Class: Insecta
- Order: Lepidoptera
- Superfamily: Noctuoidea
- Family: Erebidae
- Subfamily: Arctiinae
- Genus: Metaxanthia
- Species: M. atribasis

Binomial name
- Metaxanthia atribasis Rothschild, 1913

Synonyms
- Metaxanthia aureiventris Rothschild, 1913

= Metaxanthia atribasis =

Species of moth

Metaxanthia atribasis is a moth of the family Erebidae first described by Walter Rothschild in 1913. It is found in Ecuador, Costa Rica and Panama.
