= Bernathonomus minuta =

Scientific classification
- Domain: Eukaryota
- Kingdom: Animalia
- Phylum: Arthropoda
- Class: Insecta
- Order: Lepidoptera
- Superfamily: Noctuoidea
- Family: Erebidae
- Subfamily: Arctiinae
- Genus: Bernathonomus
- Species: B. minuta

Binomial name
- Bernathonomus minuta Fragoso, 1953

Species of moth

Bernathonomus minuta is a moth of the family Erebidae first described by Fragoso in 1953. It is found in Brazil.
