= Sychesia pseudodryas =

Scientific classification
- Domain: Eukaryota
- Kingdom: Animalia
- Phylum: Arthropoda
- Class: Insecta
- Order: Lepidoptera
- Superfamily: Noctuoidea
- Family: Erebidae
- Subfamily: Arctiinae
- Genus: Sychesia
- Species: S. pseudodryas

Binomial name
- Sychesia pseudodryas (Rothschild, 1909)

Synonyms
- Elysius pseudodryas Rothschild, 1909

Species of moth

Sychesia pseudodryas is a moth in the family Erebidae. It was described by Walter Rothschild in 1909. It is found in Peru.
