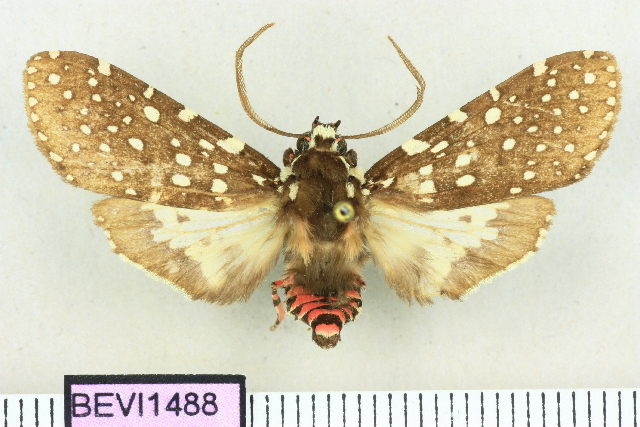

Scientific classification
- Domain: Eukaryota
- Kingdom: Animalia
- Phylum: Arthropoda
- Class: Insecta
- Order: Lepidoptera
- Superfamily: Noctuoidea
- Family: Erebidae
- Subfamily: Arctiinae
- Genus: Bernathonomus
- Species: B. punktata

Binomial name
- Bernathonomus punktata (Reich, 1933)

Synonyms
- Opharus punktata Reich, 1933

= Bernathonomus punktata =

Species of moth

Bernathonomus punktata is a moth of the family Erebidae. It is found in Brazil.
