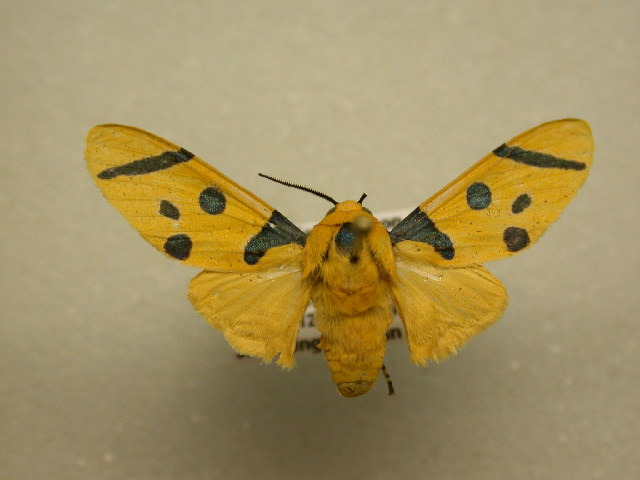
- Emurena quinquepunctata

Scientific classification
- Domain: Eukaryota
- Kingdom: Animalia
- Phylum: Arthropoda
- Class: Insecta
- Order: Lepidoptera
- Superfamily: Noctuoidea
- Family: Erebidae
- Subfamily: Arctiinae
- Subtribe: Phaegopterina
- Genus: Emurena; Watson, 1975

= Emurena =

Genus of moths

Emurena is a genus of moths in the family Erebidae.

== Species ==
- Emurena fernandezi
- Emurena lurida
- Emurena luridoides
- Emurena quinquepunctata
- Emurena tripunctata
