= Onythes =

Scientific classification
- Kingdom: Animalia
- Phylum: Arthropoda
- Class: Insecta
- Order: Lepidoptera
- Superfamily: Noctuoidea
- Family: Erebidae
- Subfamily: Arctiinae
- Tribe: Arctiini
- Subtribe: Phaegopterina
- Genus: Onythes; Walker, 1855

Genus of moths

Onythes is a genus of moths in the family Erebidae.

== Species ==
- Onythes colombiana
- Onythes flavicosta
- Onythes pallidicosta
