= Neozatrephes =

Scientific classification
- Domain: Eukaryota
- Kingdom: Animalia
- Phylum: Arthropoda
- Class: Insecta
- Order: Lepidoptera
- Superfamily: Noctuoidea
- Family: Erebidae
- Subfamily: Arctiinae
- Subtribe: Phaegopterina
- Genus: Neozatrephes; H. Druce, 1893

Genus of moths

Neozatrephes is a genus of moths in the family Erebidae. The genus was erected by Herbert Druce in 1893.

== Species ==
- Neozatrephes schausi Rothschild, 1909
- Neozatrephes telesilla H. Druce, 1893
