= Tessellarctia semivaria =

Scientific classification
- Kingdom: Animalia
- Phylum: Arthropoda
- Class: Insecta
- Order: Lepidoptera
- Superfamily: Noctuoidea
- Family: Erebidae
- Subfamily: Arctiinae
- Genus: Tessellarctia
- Species: T. semivaria

Binomial name
- Tessellarctia semivaria (Walker, 1856)

Synonyms
- Halysidota semivaria Walker, 1856; Tesselarctia semivaria

Species of moth

Tessellarctia semivaria is a moth in the family Erebidae. It was described by Francis Walker in 1856. It is found in Brazil.

== Bibliography ==
- Pitkin, Brian & Jenkins, Paul. "Search results Family: Arctiidae". Butterflies and Moths of the World. Natural History Museum, London.
