= Diaphanophora =

Scientific classification
- Kingdom: Animalia
- Phylum: Arthropoda
- Clade: Pancrustacea
- Class: Insecta
- Order: Lepidoptera
- Superfamily: Noctuoidea
- Family: Erebidae
- Subfamily: Arctiinae
- Subtribe: Phaegopterina
- Genus: Diaphanophora; Gibeaux & Coenen, 2014

Type species
- Evius albiscripta Schaus, 1905

Genus of moths

Diaphanophora is a genus of moths in the family Erebidae. It was erected by Christian Gibeaux and Francis Coenen in 2014.

== Species ==
- Diaphanophora albiscripta (Schaus, 1905)
- Diaphanophora kindlii Gibeaux & Coenen, 2014
