= Pitane fervens =

Scientific classification
- Kingdom: Animalia
- Phylum: Arthropoda
- Class: Insecta
- Order: Lepidoptera
- Superfamily: Noctuoidea
- Family: Erebidae
- Subfamily: Arctiinae
- Genus: Pitane
- Species: P. fervens

Binomial name
- Pitane fervens Walker, 1854

Species of moth

Pitane fervens is a moth in the family Erebidae first described by Francis Walker in 1854. It is found in South America.
