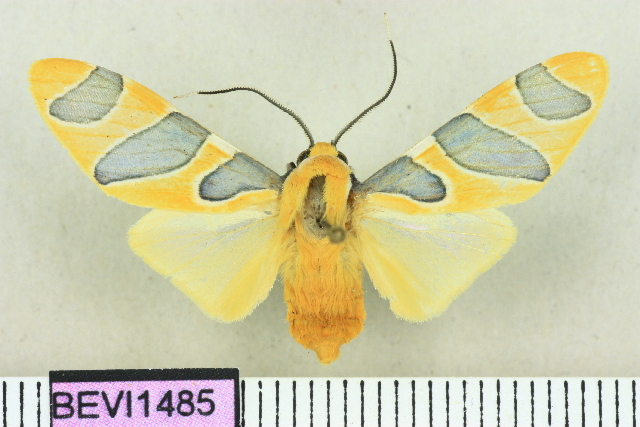

Scientific classification
- Domain: Eukaryota
- Kingdom: Animalia
- Phylum: Arthropoda
- Class: Insecta
- Order: Lepidoptera
- Superfamily: Noctuoidea
- Family: Erebidae
- Subfamily: Arctiinae
- Genus: Emurena
- Species: E. luridoides

Binomial name
- Emurena luridoides (Rothschild, 1910)

Synonyms
- Automolis luridoides Rothschild, 1910

= Emurena luridoides =

Species of moth

Emurena luridoides is a moth of the family Erebidae first described by Walter Rothschild in 1910. It is found in Brazil.
