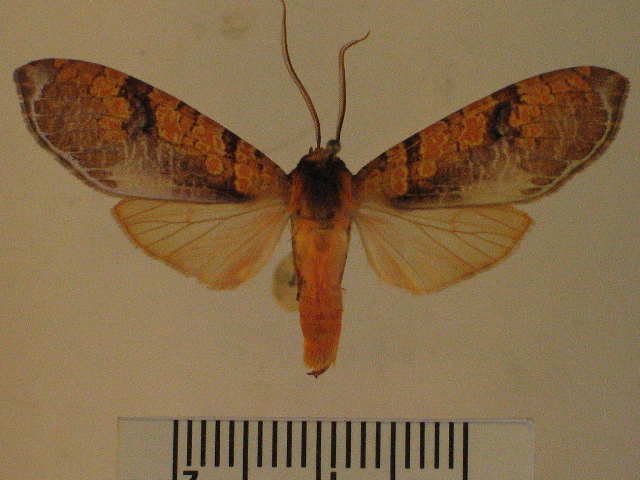

Scientific classification
- Domain: Eukaryota
- Kingdom: Animalia
- Phylum: Arthropoda
- Class: Insecta
- Order: Lepidoptera
- Superfamily: Noctuoidea
- Family: Erebidae
- Subfamily: Arctiinae
- Genus: Graphea
- Species: G. marmorea

Binomial name
- Graphea marmorea Schaus, 1894

= Graphea marmorea =

Species of moth

Graphea marmorea is a moth of the family Erebidae first described by William Schaus in 1894. It is found in Panama, Peru, Venezuela and Brazil.
