= Metaxanthia threnodes =

Scientific classification
- Domain: Eukaryota
- Kingdom: Animalia
- Phylum: Arthropoda
- Class: Insecta
- Order: Lepidoptera
- Superfamily: Noctuoidea
- Family: Erebidae
- Subfamily: Arctiinae
- Genus: Metaxanthia
- Species: M. threnodes

Binomial name
- Metaxanthia threnodes H. Druce, 1905

Species of moth

Metaxanthia threnodes is a moth of the family Erebidae first described by Herbert Druce in 1905. It is found in Suriname, Venezuela and French Guiana.
