= Metacrisia =

Scientific classification
- Kingdom: Animalia
- Phylum: Arthropoda
- Class: Insecta
- Order: Lepidoptera
- Superfamily: Noctuoidea
- Family: Erebidae
- Subfamily: Arctiinae
- Subtribe: Phaegopterina
- Genus: Metacrisia; Hampson, 1901

Genus of moths

Metacrisia is a genus of moths in the family Erebidae. The genus was erected by George Hampson in 1901.

== Species ==
- Metacrisia courregesi (Dognin, 1891)
- Metacrisia schausi Dognin, 1911
- Metacrisia woolfsonae Toulgoët, 1988
