= Dialeucias pallidistriata =

Scientific classification
- Kingdom: Animalia
- Phylum: Arthropoda
- Class: Insecta
- Order: Lepidoptera
- Superfamily: Noctuoidea
- Family: Erebidae
- Subfamily: Arctiinae
- Genus: Dialeucias
- Species: D. pallidistriata

Binomial name
- Dialeucias pallidistriata Hampson, 1901

Species of moth

Dialeucias pallidistriata is a moth of the family Erebidae first described by George Hampson in 1901. It is found in Brazil, Suriname, Ecuador, Peru and Venezuela.
