= Romualdia opharina =

Scientific classification
- Domain: Eukaryota
- Kingdom: Animalia
- Phylum: Arthropoda
- Class: Insecta
- Order: Lepidoptera
- Superfamily: Noctuoidea
- Family: Erebidae
- Subfamily: Arctiinae
- Genus: Romualdia
- Species: R. opharina

Binomial name
- Romualdia opharina (Schaus, 1921)

Synonyms
- Amastus opharina Schaus, 1921

Species of moth

Romualdia opharina is a moth in the family Erebidae first described by William Schaus in 1921. It is found in Brazil.
