= Melanarctia ockendeni =

Scientific classification
- Domain: Eukaryota
- Kingdom: Animalia
- Phylum: Arthropoda
- Class: Insecta
- Order: Lepidoptera
- Superfamily: Noctuoidea
- Family: Erebidae
- Subfamily: Arctiinae
- Genus: Melanarctia
- Species: M. ockendeni

Binomial name
- Melanarctia ockendeni (Rothschild, 1909)

Synonyms
- Automolis ockendeni Rothschild, 1909; Automolis occendeni Hampson, 1920

Species of moth

Melanarctia ockendeni is a moth in the family Erebidae. It was described by Walter Rothschild in 1909. It is found in Peru.
