= Sychesia erubescens =

Scientific classification
- Domain: Eukaryota
- Kingdom: Animalia
- Phylum: Arthropoda
- Class: Insecta
- Order: Lepidoptera
- Superfamily: Noctuoidea
- Family: Erebidae
- Subfamily: Arctiinae
- Genus: Sychesia
- Species: S. erubescens

Binomial name
- Sychesia erubescens Jordan, 1916

Species of moth

Sychesia erubescens is a moth in the family Erebidae. It was described by Karl Jordan in 1916. It is found in Brazil.
