= Sychesia subtilis =

Scientific classification
- Domain: Eukaryota
- Kingdom: Animalia
- Phylum: Arthropoda
- Class: Insecta
- Order: Lepidoptera
- Superfamily: Noctuoidea
- Family: Erebidae
- Subfamily: Arctiinae
- Genus: Sychesia
- Species: S. subtilis

Binomial name
- Sychesia subtilis (Butler, 1878)

Synonyms
- Phaegoptera subtilis Butler, 1878; Sychesia megalobus Jordan, 1916

Species of moth

Sychesia subtilis is a moth in the family Erebidae. It was described by Arthur Gardiner Butler in 1878. It is found in Brazil and Suriname.

== Subspecies ==
- Sychesia subtilis subtilis (Brazil: Amazons)
- Sychesia subtilis megalobus Jordan, 1916 (Suriname)
