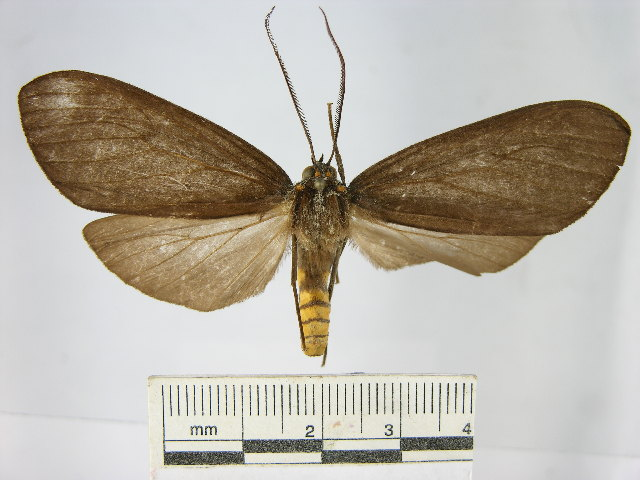

Scientific classification
- Domain: Eukaryota
- Kingdom: Animalia
- Phylum: Arthropoda
- Class: Insecta
- Order: Lepidoptera
- Superfamily: Noctuoidea
- Family: Erebidae
- Subfamily: Arctiinae
- Genus: Pseudapistosia
- Species: P. umber

Binomial name
- Pseudapistosia umber (Cramer, 1775)

Synonyms
- Phalaena umber Cramer, [1775]; Apistosia umber; Elysius umber; Calidota gigas; Opharus gigas Dognin, 1890

= Pseudapistosia umber =

Species of moth

Pseudapistosia umber is a moth in the family Erebidae. It was described by Pieter Cramer in 1775. It is found in Panama, Colombia, Suriname, Ecuador and Peru.
