= Romualdia =

Scientific classification
- Domain: Eukaryota
- Kingdom: Animalia
- Phylum: Arthropoda
- Class: Insecta
- Order: Lepidoptera
- Superfamily: Noctuoidea
- Family: Erebidae
- Subfamily: Arctiinae
- Subtribe: Phaegopterina
- Genus: Romualdia; Rego Barros, 1957

Genus of moths

Romualdia is a genus of moths in the family Erebidae.

== Species ==
- Romualdia opharina (Schaus, 1921)
- Romualdia chimaera (Rothschild, 1935)
- Romualdia elongata (Felder, 1874)
