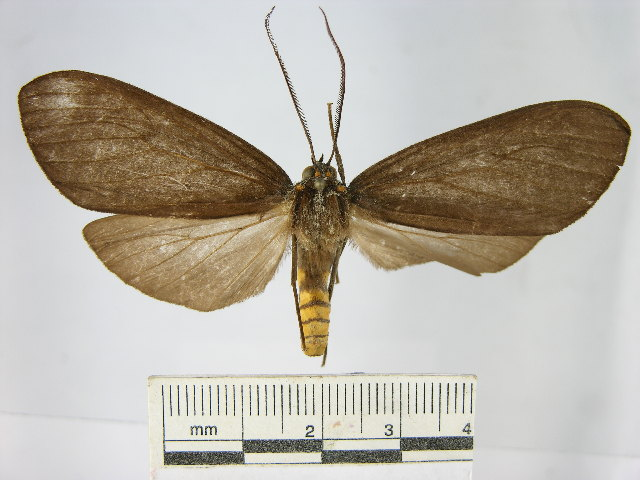
- Pseudapistosia gigas

Scientific classification
- Domain: Eukaryota
- Kingdom: Animalia
- Phylum: Arthropoda
- Class: Insecta
- Order: Lepidoptera
- Superfamily: Noctuoidea
- Family: Erebidae
- Subfamily: Arctiinae
- Subtribe: Phaegopterina
- Genus: Pseudapistosia; Möschler, 1878

= Pseudapistosia =

Genus of moths

Pseudapistosia is a genus of moths in the family Erebidae.

== Species ==
- Pseudapistosia leucocorypha Dognin, 1914
- Pseudapistosia similis Hampson, 1901
- Pseudapistosia umber Cramer, 1775
