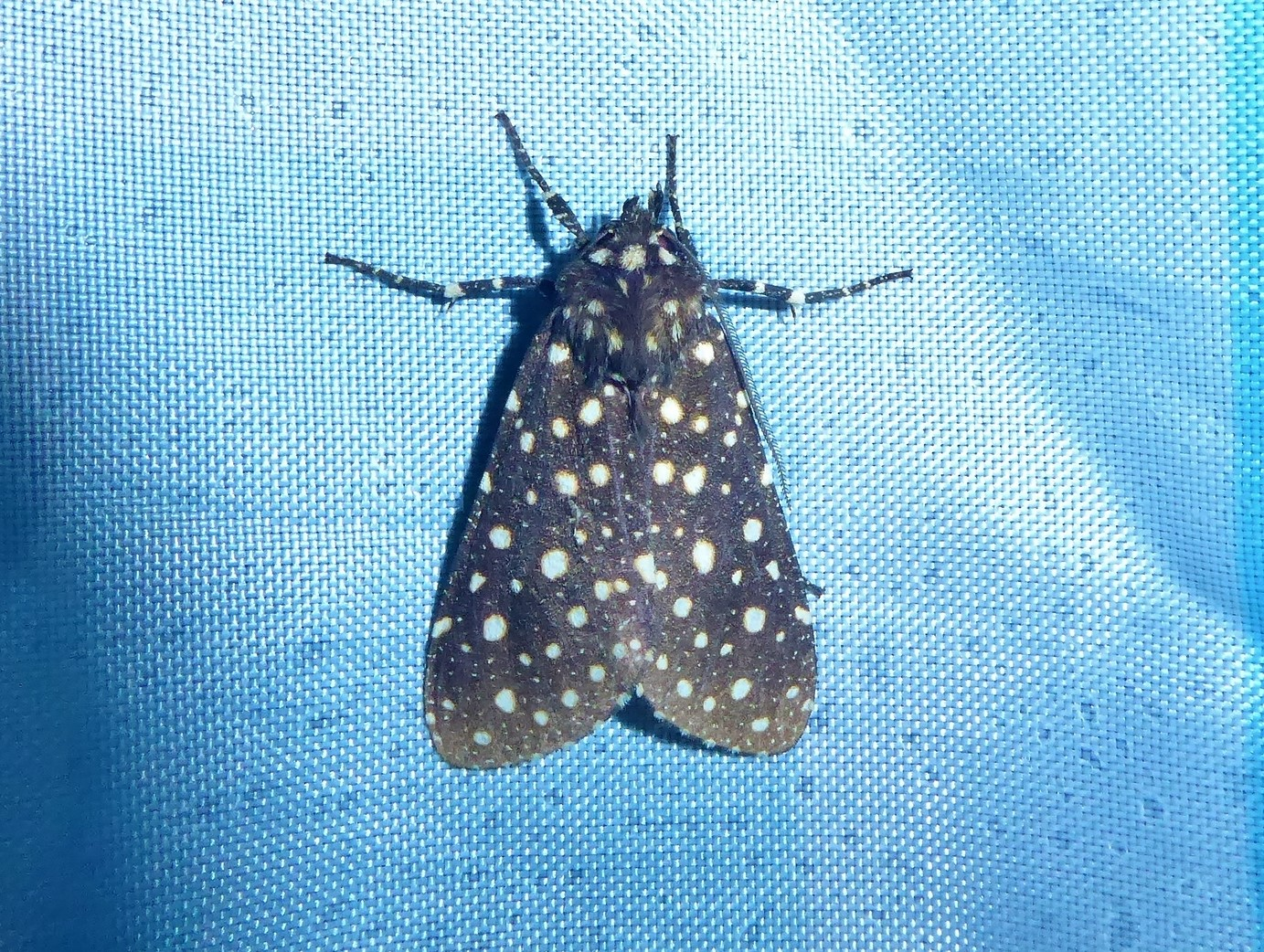
- Bernathonomus spp.

Scientific classification
- Domain: Eukaryota
- Kingdom: Animalia
- Phylum: Arthropoda
- Class: Insecta
- Order: Lepidoptera
- Superfamily: Noctuoidea
- Family: Erebidae
- Subfamily: Arctiinae
- Subtribe: Phaegopterina
- Genus: Bernathonomus; Fragoso, 1953

Synonyms
- Bernathomonus Vincent, 2011

= Bernathonomus =

Genus of moths

Bernathonomus is a genus of moths in the family Erebidae.

== Species ==
- Bernathonomus aureopuncta
- Bernathonomus minuta
- Bernathonomus ovuliger
- Bernathonomus piperita
- Bernathonomus postrosea
- Bernathonomus punktata
