= Dialeucias =

Scientific classification
- Kingdom: Animalia
- Phylum: Arthropoda
- Class: Insecta
- Order: Lepidoptera
- Superfamily: Noctuoidea
- Family: Erebidae
- Subfamily: Arctiinae
- Subtribe: Phaegopterina
- Genus: Dialeucias; Hampson, 1901

Genus of moths

Dialeucias is a genus of moths in the family Erebidae first described by George Hampson in 1901.

== Species ==
- Dialeucias pallidistriata
- Dialeucias variegata
- Dialeucias violascens
