= Dialeucias variegata =

Scientific classification
- Domain: Eukaryota
- Kingdom: Animalia
- Phylum: Arthropoda
- Class: Insecta
- Order: Lepidoptera
- Superfamily: Noctuoidea
- Family: Erebidae
- Subfamily: Arctiinae
- Genus: Dialeucias
- Species: D. variegata

Binomial name
- Dialeucias variegata Dognin, 1923

Species of moth

Dialeucias variegata is a moth of the family Erebidae first described by Paul Dognin in 1923. It is found in French Guiana.
