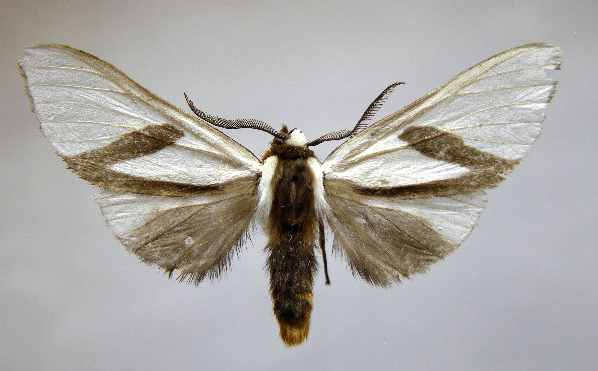

Scientific classification
- Kingdom: Animalia
- Phylum: Arthropoda
- Clade: Pancrustacea
- Class: Insecta
- Order: Lepidoptera
- Superfamily: Noctuoidea
- Family: Erebidae
- Subfamily: Arctiinae
- Genus: Turuptiana
- Species: T. lacipea

Binomial name
- Turuptiana lacipea (H. Druce, 1890)

Synonyms
- Sallaea lacipea H. Druce, 1890

= Turuptiana lacipea =

Species of moth

Turuptiana lacipea is a moth in the family Erebidae. It was described by Herbert Druce in 1890. It is found in Guatemala.
