= Phacusosia =

Scientific classification
- Kingdom: Animalia
- Phylum: Arthropoda
- Class: Insecta
- Order: Lepidoptera
- Superfamily: Noctuoidea
- Family: Erebidae
- Subfamily: Arctiinae
- Genus: Phacusosia; Hampson, 1911
- Species: P. xanthosoma

Binomial name
- Phacusosia xanthosoma Hampson, 1911

Synonyms
- Phacusosia grandis Rothschild, 1913

Genus of moths

Phacusosia is a monotypic moth genus of the family Erebidae. Its only species, Phacusosia xanthosoma, is found in Papua New Guinea. Both the genus and species were described by George Hampson in 1911.
