= Sychesia omissus =

Scientific classification
- Domain: Eukaryota
- Kingdom: Animalia
- Phylum: Arthropoda
- Class: Insecta
- Order: Lepidoptera
- Superfamily: Noctuoidea
- Family: Erebidae
- Subfamily: Arctiinae
- Genus: Sychesia
- Species: S. omissus

Binomial name
- Sychesia omissus (Rothschild, 1910)

Synonyms
- Elysius omissus Rothschild, 1910

Species of moth

Sychesia omissus is a moth in the family Erebidae. It was described by Walter Rothschild in 1910. It is found in Peru.
