= Cresera intensa =

Scientific classification
- Domain: Eukaryota
- Kingdom: Animalia
- Phylum: Arthropoda
- Class: Insecta
- Order: Lepidoptera
- Superfamily: Noctuoidea
- Family: Erebidae
- Subfamily: Arctiinae
- Genus: Cresera
- Species: C. intensa

Binomial name
- Cresera intensa (Rothschild, 1909)

Synonyms
- Prumala intensa Rothschild, 1909

Species of moth

Cresera intensa is a moth of the family Erebidae. It was described by Walter Rothschild in 1909. It is found in French Guiana, Brazil and the Amazon region.
