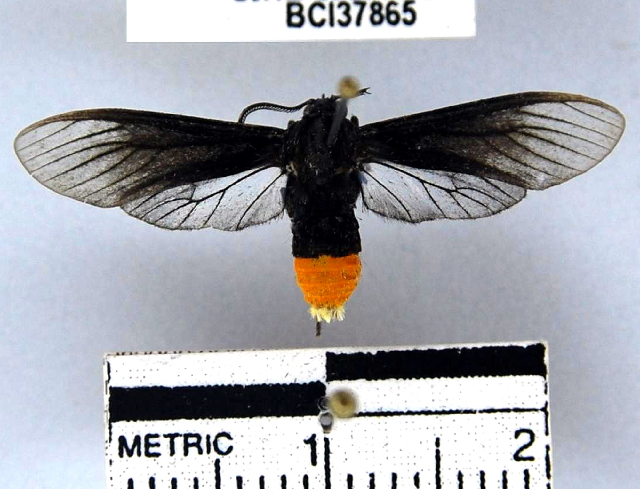
- Metaxanthia atribasis

Scientific classification
- Domain: Eukaryota
- Kingdom: Animalia
- Phylum: Arthropoda
- Class: Insecta
- Order: Lepidoptera
- Superfamily: Noctuoidea
- Family: Erebidae
- Subfamily: Arctiinae
- Subtribe: Phaegopterina
- Genus: Metaxanthia; H. Druce, 1899

Synonyms
- Metaxanthia Hampson, 1901

= Metaxanthia =

Genus of moths

Metaxanthia is a genus of moths in the family Erebidae. The genus was erected by Herbert Druce in 1899.

== Species ==
- Metaxanthia atribasis
- Metaxanthia threnodes
- Metaxanthia vespiformis
