= Emurena lurida =

Scientific classification
- Domain: Eukaryota
- Kingdom: Animalia
- Phylum: Arthropoda
- Class: Insecta
- Order: Lepidoptera
- Superfamily: Noctuoidea
- Family: Erebidae
- Subfamily: Arctiinae
- Genus: Emurena
- Species: E. lurida

Binomial name
- Emurena lurida (Felder, 1874)

Synonyms
- Eucyrta lurida Felder, 1874; Automolis lurida

Species of moth

Emurena lurida is a moth of the family Erebidae first described by Felder in 1874. It is found in French Guiana, Peru and Bolivia.
