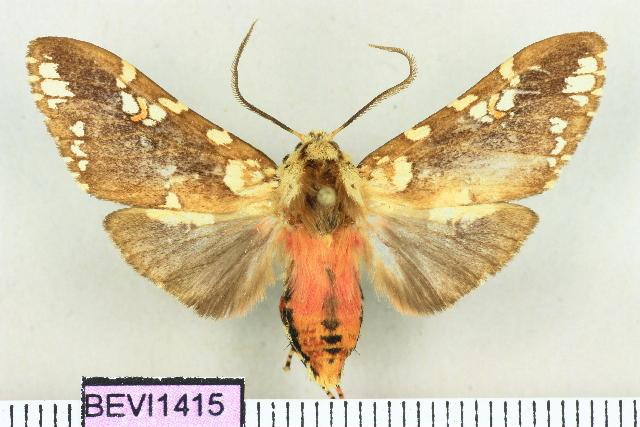

Scientific classification
- Domain: Eukaryota
- Kingdom: Animalia
- Phylum: Arthropoda
- Class: Insecta
- Order: Lepidoptera
- Superfamily: Noctuoidea
- Family: Erebidae
- Subfamily: Arctiinae
- Genus: Pseudotessellarctia
- Species: P. ursina

Binomial name
- Pseudotessellarctia ursina (Schaus, 1892)

Synonyms
- Phaegoptera ursina Schaus, 1892; Tessellarctia ursina

= Pseudotessellarctia ursina =

Species of moth

Pseudotessellarctia ursina is a moth in the family Erebidae. It was described by Schaus in 1892. It is found in Brazil.
