= Metacrisia courregesi =

Scientific classification
- Domain: Eukaryota
- Kingdom: Animalia
- Phylum: Arthropoda
- Class: Insecta
- Order: Lepidoptera
- Superfamily: Noctuoidea
- Family: Erebidae
- Subfamily: Arctiinae
- Genus: Metacrisia
- Species: M. courregesi

Binomial name
- Metacrisia courregesi (Dognin, 1891)

Synonyms
- Purius courregesi Dognin, 1891

Species of moth

Metacrisia courregesi is a moth of the family Erebidae first described by Paul Dognin in 1891. It is found in Ecuador.
