= Pseudotessellarctia brunneitincta =

Scientific classification
- Kingdom: Animalia
- Phylum: Arthropoda
- Class: Insecta
- Order: Lepidoptera
- Superfamily: Noctuoidea
- Family: Erebidae
- Subfamily: Arctiinae
- Genus: Pseudotessellarctia
- Species: P. brunneitincta

Binomial name
- Pseudotessellarctia brunneitincta (Hampson, 1901)

Synonyms
- Halysidota brunneitincta Hampson, 1901

Species of moth

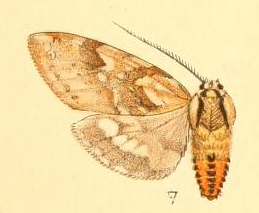

Pseudotessellarctia brunneitincta is a moth in the family Erebidae. It was described by George Hampson in 1901. It is found in Brazil.
