= Apyre separata =

Scientific classification
- Kingdom: Animalia
- Phylum: Arthropoda
- Class: Insecta
- Order: Lepidoptera
- Superfamily: Noctuoidea
- Family: Erebidae
- Subfamily: Arctiinae
- Genus: Apyre
- Species: A. separata

Binomial name
- Apyre separata Walker, 1854

Synonyms
- Automolis separata Hampson, 1901

Species of moth

Apyre separata is a moth of the family Erebidae. It was described by Francis Walker in 1854. It is found in Brazil, French Guiana, Suriname and Guyana.
