= Sychesia dryas =

Scientific classification
- Domain: Eukaryota
- Kingdom: Animalia
- Phylum: Arthropoda
- Class: Insecta
- Order: Lepidoptera
- Superfamily: Noctuoidea
- Family: Erebidae
- Subfamily: Arctiinae
- Genus: Sychesia
- Species: S. dryas

Binomial name
- Sychesia dryas (Cramer, 1775)

Synonyms
- Phalaena dryas Cramer, [1775]; Halesidota basipennis Walker, 1856; Sychesia fimbria Möschler, 1878; Elysius dryas var. erythrinovertex Strand, 1919; Sychesia tupus Jordan, 1916

Species of moth

Sychesia dryas is a moth in the family Erebidae. It was described by Pieter Cramer in 1775. It is found on the West Indies, Guatemala, Costa Rica, French Guiana, Brazil, Peru, Ecuador, Bolivia, Suriname, Venezuela and Trinidad.

== Subspecies ==
- Sychesia dryas dryas
- Sychesia dryas tupus Jordan, 1916
