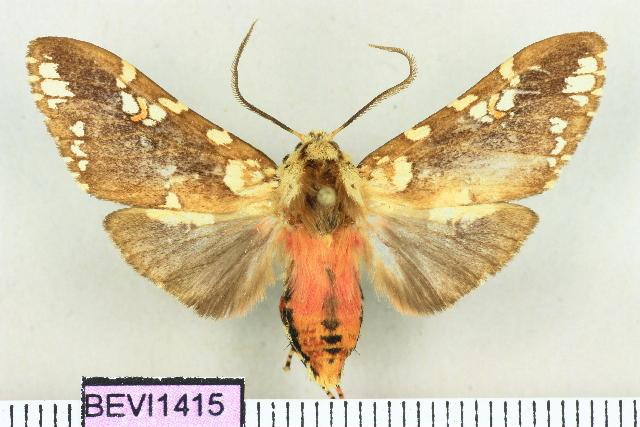
- Pseudotessellarctia ursina

Scientific classification
- Domain: Eukaryota
- Kingdom: Animalia
- Phylum: Arthropoda
- Class: Insecta
- Order: Lepidoptera
- Superfamily: Noctuoidea
- Family: Erebidae
- Subfamily: Arctiinae
- Subtribe: Phaegopterina
- Genus: Pseudotessellarctia; Travassos, 1949

Synonyms
- Pseudotesselarctia

= Pseudotessellarctia =

Genus of moths

Pseudotessellarctia is a genus of moths in the family Erebidae.

== Species ==
- Pseudotessellarctia brunneitincta Hampson, 1901
- Pseudotessellarctia ursina Schaus, 1892
