= Romualdia chimaera =

Scientific classification
- Domain: Eukaryota
- Kingdom: Animalia
- Phylum: Arthropoda
- Class: Insecta
- Order: Lepidoptera
- Superfamily: Noctuoidea
- Family: Erebidae
- Subfamily: Arctiinae
- Genus: Romualdia
- Species: R. chimaera

Binomial name
- Romualdia chimaera (Rothschild, 1935)

Synonyms
- Amastus chimaera Rothschild, 1935

Species of moth

Romualdia chimaera is a moth in the family Erebidae first described by Walter Rothschild in 1935. It is found in the Brazilian state of Santa Catarina.
