= Turuptiana =

Scientific classification
- Kingdom: Animalia
- Phylum: Arthropoda
- Class: Insecta
- Order: Lepidoptera
- Superfamily: Noctuoidea
- Family: Erebidae
- Subfamily: Arctiinae
- Subtribe: Phaegopterina
- Genus: Turuptiana; Walker, 1869

Synonyms
- Sallaea Felder, 1874

Genus of moths

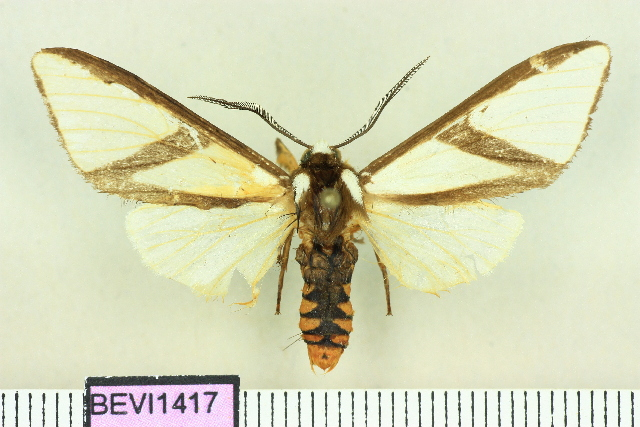
Turuptiana affinis

Turuptiana is a genus of moths in the family Erebidae.

== Species ==
- Turuptiana affinis Rothschild, 1909
- Turuptiana lacipea Druce, 1890
- Turuptiana obliqua Walker, 1869
