= Syntomostola semiflava =

Scientific classification
- Domain: Eukaryota
- Kingdom: Animalia
- Phylum: Arthropoda
- Class: Insecta
- Order: Lepidoptera
- Superfamily: Noctuoidea
- Family: Erebidae
- Subfamily: Arctiinae
- Genus: Syntomostola
- Species: S. semiflava

Binomial name
- Syntomostola semiflava Dognin, 1923

Species of moth

Syntomostola semiflava is a moth in the family Erebidae. It was described by Paul Dognin in 1923. It is found in Brazil.
