= Metacrisia schausi =

Scientific classification
- Domain: Eukaryota
- Kingdom: Animalia
- Phylum: Arthropoda
- Class: Insecta
- Order: Lepidoptera
- Superfamily: Noctuoidea
- Family: Erebidae
- Subfamily: Arctiinae
- Genus: Metacrisia
- Species: M. schausi

Binomial name
- Metacrisia schausi Dognin, 1911

Species of moth

Metacrisia schausi is a moth of the family Erebidae first described by Paul Dognin in 1911. It is found in Colombia.
