= Hypidalia enervis =

Scientific classification
- Kingdom: Animalia
- Phylum: Arthropoda
- Clade: Pancrustacea
- Class: Insecta
- Order: Lepidoptera
- Superfamily: Noctuoidea
- Family: Erebidae
- Subfamily: Arctiinae
- Genus: Hypidalia
- Species: H. enervis

Binomial name
- Hypidalia enervis (Schaus, 1894)

Synonyms
- Idalus enervis Schaus, 1894

Species of moth

Hypidalia enervis is a moth of the subfamily Arctiinae first described by Schaus in 1894. It is found in Brazil and Paraguay.
