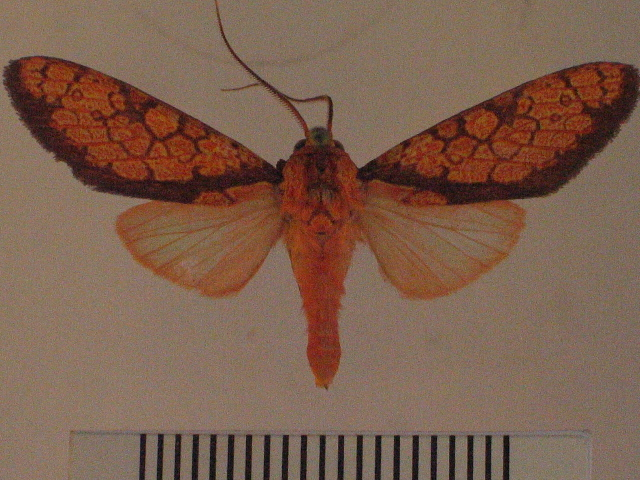

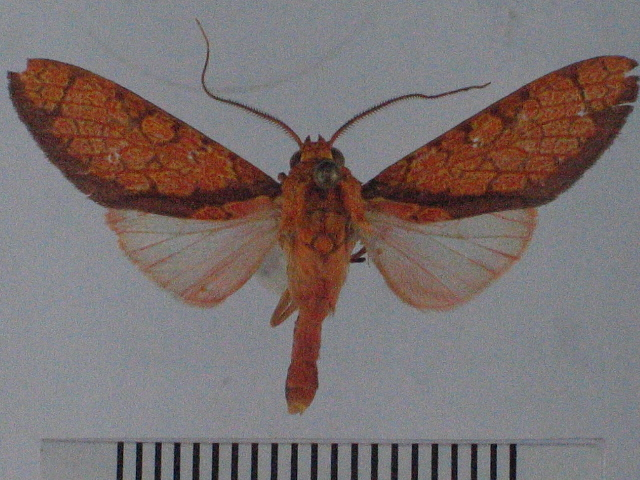

Scientific classification
- Kingdom: Animalia
- Phylum: Arthropoda
- Clade: Pancrustacea
- Class: Insecta
- Order: Lepidoptera
- Superfamily: Noctuoidea
- Family: Erebidae
- Subfamily: Arctiinae
- Genus: Cresera
- Species: C. hieroglyphica

Binomial name
- Cresera hieroglyphica (Schaus, 1905)

Synonyms
- Prumala hieroglyphica Schaus, 1905; Prumala intermedia Rothschild, 1922; Cresera intermedia

= Cresera hieroglyphica =

Species of moth

Cresera hieroglyphica is a moth of the family Erebidae. It is found in French Guiana, Brazil, Venezuela and Peru.
