= Amphelarctia =

Scientific classification
- Domain: Eukaryota
- Kingdom: Animalia
- Phylum: Arthropoda
- Class: Insecta
- Order: Lepidoptera
- Superfamily: Noctuoidea
- Family: Erebidae
- Subfamily: Arctiinae
- Genus: Amphelarctia; Watson, 1975
- Species: A. priscilla

Binomial name
- Amphelarctia priscilla (Schaus, 1911)

Synonyms
- Automolis priscilla Schaus, 1911

Genus of moths

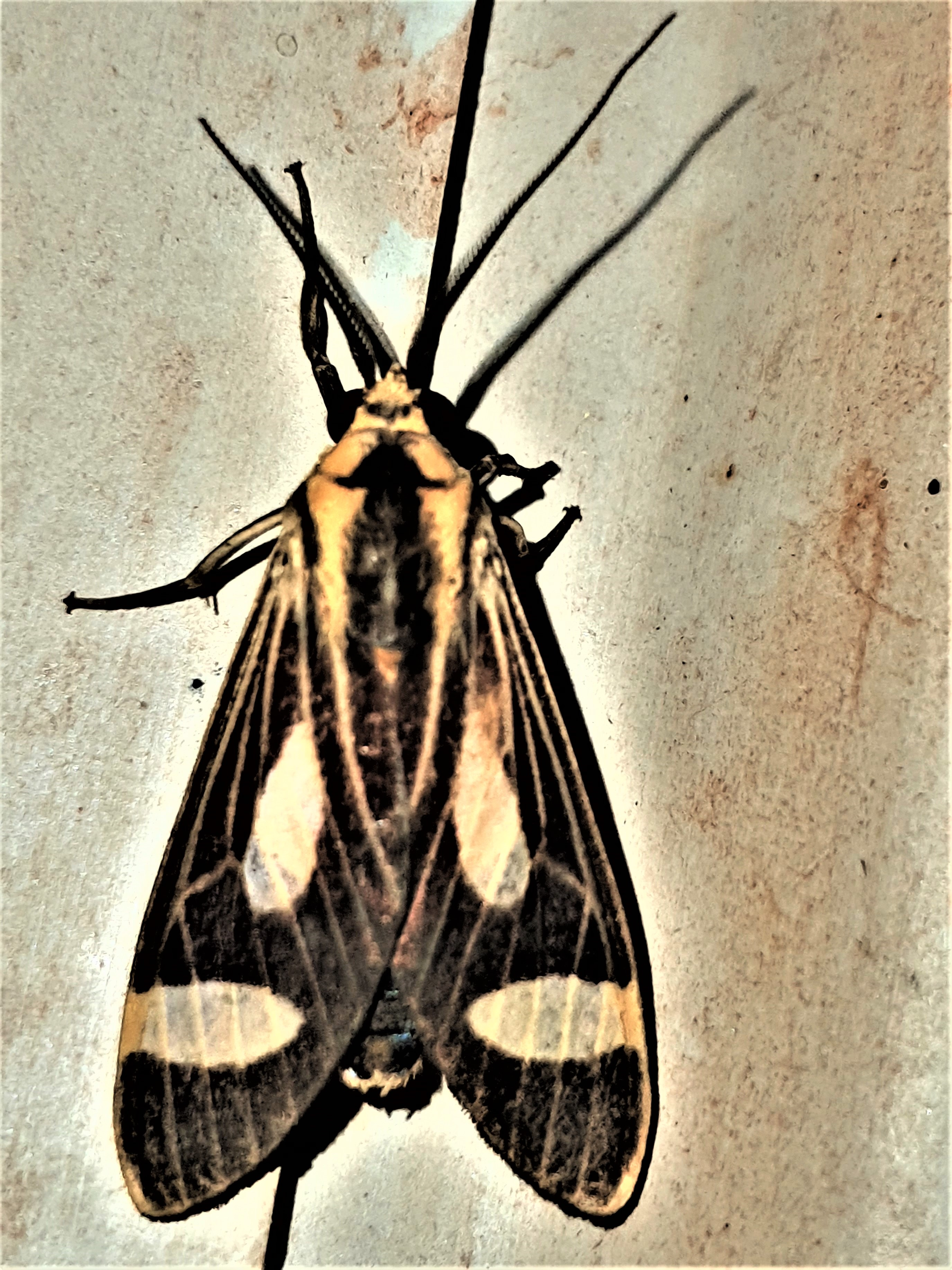

Amphelarctia is a monotypic moth genus in the family Erebidae described by Allan Watson in 1975. Its single species, Amphelarctia priscilla, was first described by William Schaus in 1911. It is found in French Guiana, Venezuela, Ecuador, Peru, Suriname and Costa Rica.
