= Schalotomis =

Scientific classification
- Kingdom: Animalia
- Phylum: Arthropoda
- Class: Insecta
- Order: Lepidoptera
- Superfamily: Noctuoidea
- Family: Erebidae
- Subfamily: Arctiinae
- Genus: Schalotomis; Hampson, 1920
- Species: S. roseothorax

Binomial name
- Schalotomis roseothorax (Rothschild, 1913)

Synonyms
- Diarhabdosia roseothorax Rothschild, 1913

Genus of moths

Schalotomis is a monotypic moth genus in the family Erebidae erected by George Hampson in 1920. Its only species, Schalotomis roseothorax, was first described by Walter Rothschild in 1913. It is found in Peru.
