= Pydnaodes =

Scientific classification
- Kingdom: Animalia
- Phylum: Arthropoda
- Class: Insecta
- Order: Lepidoptera
- Superfamily: Noctuoidea
- Family: Erebidae
- Subfamily: Arctiinae
- Genus: Pydnaodes; Hampson, 1911
- Species: P. distincta

Binomial name
- Pydnaodes distincta (Rothschild, 1909)

Synonyms
- Tesselarctia distincta Rothschild, 1909

Genus of moths

Pydnaodes is a monotypic moth genus in the family Erebidae erected by George Hampson in 1911. Its only species, Pydnaodes distincta, was first described by Walter Rothschild in 1909. It is found in the upper Amazon region.
