= Lepidolutzia =

Scientific classification
- Domain: Eukaryota
- Kingdom: Animalia
- Phylum: Arthropoda
- Class: Insecta
- Order: Lepidoptera
- Superfamily: Noctuoidea
- Family: Erebidae
- Subfamily: Arctiinae
- Genus: Lepidolutzia; Rego Barros, 1956
- Species: L. baucis

Binomial name
- Lepidolutzia baucis (Dalman, 1823)

Synonyms
- Charidea baucis Dalman, 1823; Glaucopis bombycina Perty, 1834; Pygoctenucha dukinfieldia Schaus, 1896; Halysidota costistrigata Schaus, 1921

Genus of moths

Lepidolutzia is a monotypic moth genus in the family Erebidae described by Rego Barros in 1956. Its only species, Lepidolutzia baucis, was first described by Johan Wilhelm Dalman in 1823. It is found on Cuba, Bolivia and the Brazilian state of Pará.
