= Wanderbiltia =

Scientific classification
- Domain: Eukaryota
- Kingdom: Animalia
- Phylum: Arthropoda
- Class: Insecta
- Order: Lepidoptera
- Superfamily: Noctuoidea
- Family: Erebidae
- Subfamily: Arctiinae
- Genus: Wanderbiltia; Régo Barros, 1958
- Species: W. wanderbilti

Binomial name
- Wanderbiltia wanderbilti Régo Barros, 1958

Genus of moths

Wanderbiltia is a monotypic moth genus in the family Erebidae. Its only species, Wanderbiltia wanderbilti, is found in Brazil. Both the genus and species were first described by Alfredo Rei do Régo Barros in 1958.
