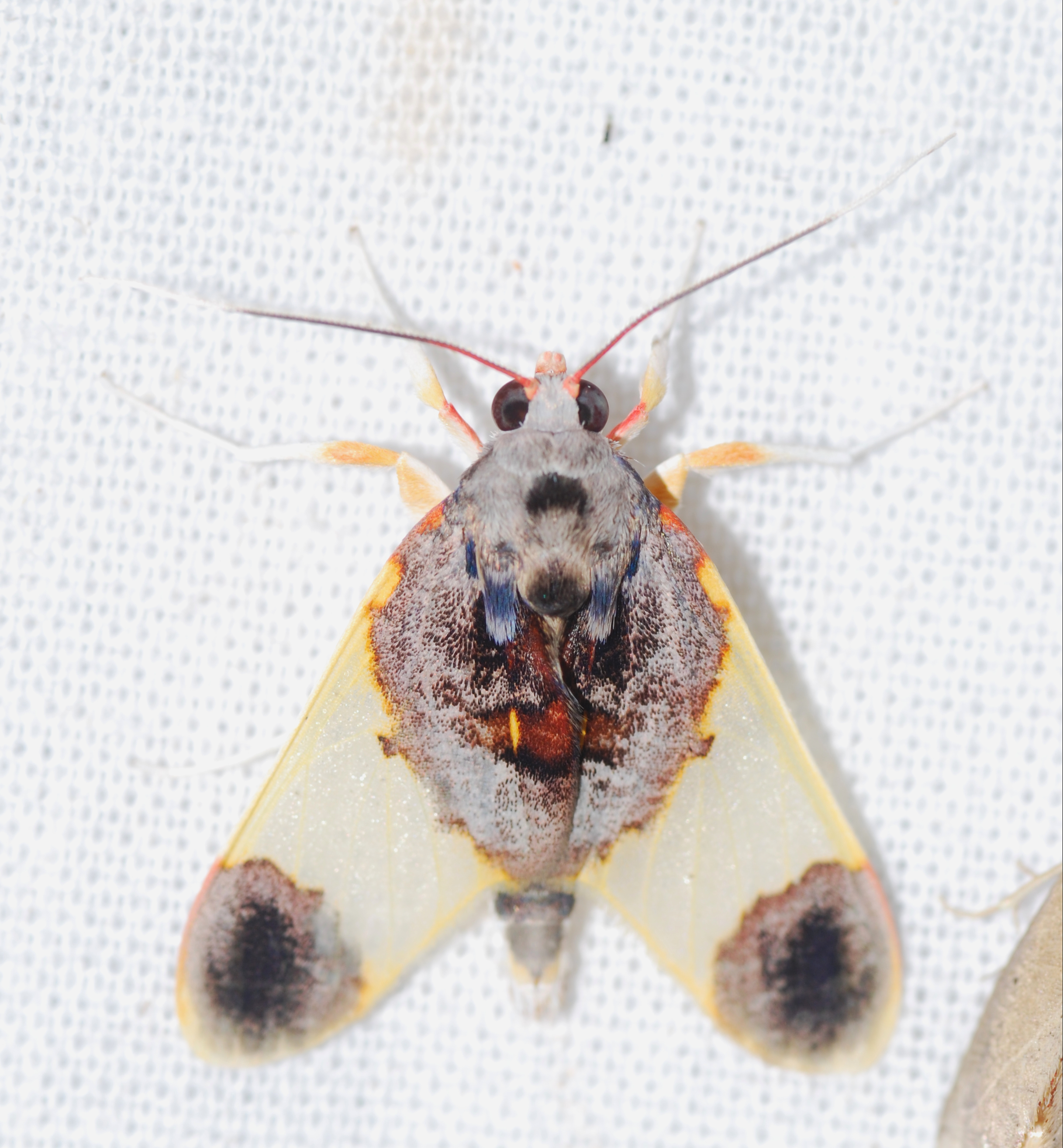

Scientific classification
- Kingdom: Animalia
- Phylum: Arthropoda
- Class: Insecta
- Order: Lepidoptera
- Superfamily: Noctuoidea
- Family: Erebidae
- Subfamily: Arctiinae
- Genus: Thyromolis; Hampson, 1901
- Species: T. pythia

Binomial name
- Thyromolis pythia (H. Druce, 1900)

Synonyms
- Idalus pythia H. Druce, 1900

= Thyromolis =

Genus of moths

Thyromolis is a monotypic moth genus in the family Erebidae erected by George Hampson in 1901. Its only species, Thyromolis pythia, was first described by Herbert Druce in 1900. It is found in French Guiana, Guyana, Bolivia and the Brazilian state of Amazonas.
