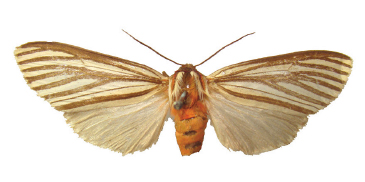

Scientific classification
- Domain: Eukaryota
- Kingdom: Animalia
- Phylum: Arthropoda
- Class: Insecta
- Order: Lepidoptera
- Superfamily: Noctuoidea
- Family: Erebidae
- Subfamily: Arctiinae
- Genus: Lepidojulia; Orfila, 1952
- Species: L. arnaui

Binomial name
- Lepidojulia arnaui Orfila, 1952

= Lepidojulia =

Genus of moths

Lepidojulia is a monotypic moth genus in the family Erebidae. Its only species, Lepidojulia arnaui, is found in the Tucumán Province of Argentina. Both the genus and species were first described by Orfila in 1952.
