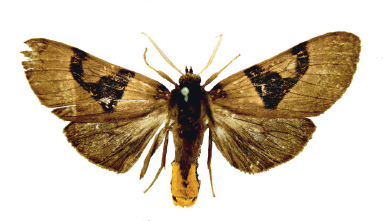
- A pinned specimen of Xanthophaeina levis

Scientific classification
- Kingdom: Animalia
- Phylum: Arthropoda
- Class: Insecta
- Order: Lepidoptera
- Superfamily: Noctuoidea
- Family: Erebidae
- Subfamily: Arctiinae
- Genus: Xanthophaeina; Hampson, 1901
- Species: X. levis

Binomial name
- Xanthophaeina levis (H. Druce, 1899)

Synonyms
- Phaegoptera levis H. Druce, 1899

= Xanthophaeina =

Genus of moths

Xanthophaeina is a monotypic moth genus in the family Erebidae erected by George Hampson. Its only species, Xanthophaeina levis, was first described by Herbert Druce in 1899. It is found in Colombia and Brazil.
