= Zaevius =

Scientific classification
- Kingdom: Animalia
- Phylum: Arthropoda
- Class: Insecta
- Order: Lepidoptera
- Superfamily: Noctuoidea
- Family: Erebidae
- Subfamily: Arctiinae
- Genus: Zaevius; Dyar, 1910
- Species: Z. calocore

Binomial name
- Zaevius calocore Dyar, 1910

Genus of moths

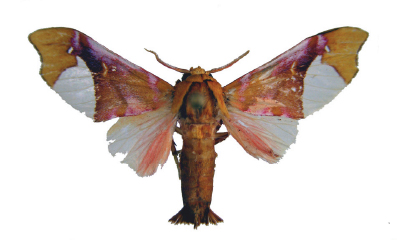
Zaevius calocore

Zaevius is a monotypic moth genus in the family Erebidae. Its only species, Zaevius calocore, is found in French Guiana, Guyana and Venezuela. Both the genus and species were first described by Harrison Gray Dyar Jr. in 1910.
