= Nannodota =

Scientific classification
- Kingdom: Animalia
- Phylum: Arthropoda
- Class: Insecta
- Order: Lepidoptera
- Superfamily: Noctuoidea
- Family: Erebidae
- Subfamily: Arctiinae
- Genus: Nannodota; Hampson, 1911
- Species: N. minuta

Binomial name
- Nannodota minuta (Rothschild, 1910)

Synonyms
- Halisidota minuta Rothschild, 1910

Genus of moths

Nannodota is a monotypic moth genus in the family Erebidae erected by George Hampson in 1911. Its only species, Nannodota minuta, was first described by Walter Rothschild in 1910. It is found in Peru.
