= Mellamastus =

Scientific classification
- Kingdom: Animalia
- Phylum: Arthropoda
- Clade: Pancrustacea
- Class: Insecta
- Order: Lepidoptera
- Superfamily: Noctuoidea
- Family: Erebidae
- Subfamily: Arctiinae
- Genus: Mellamastus; Rego Barros, 1959
- Species: M. nero

Binomial name
- Mellamastus nero (Weymer, 1907)

Synonyms
- Amastus nero Weymer, 1907; Halisidota nero

Genus of moths

The Mellamastus nero

Mellamastus is a monotypic moth genus in the family Erebidae described by Rego Barros in 1959. Its only species, Mellamastus nero, was first described by Gustav Weymer in 1907. It is found in Brazil.
