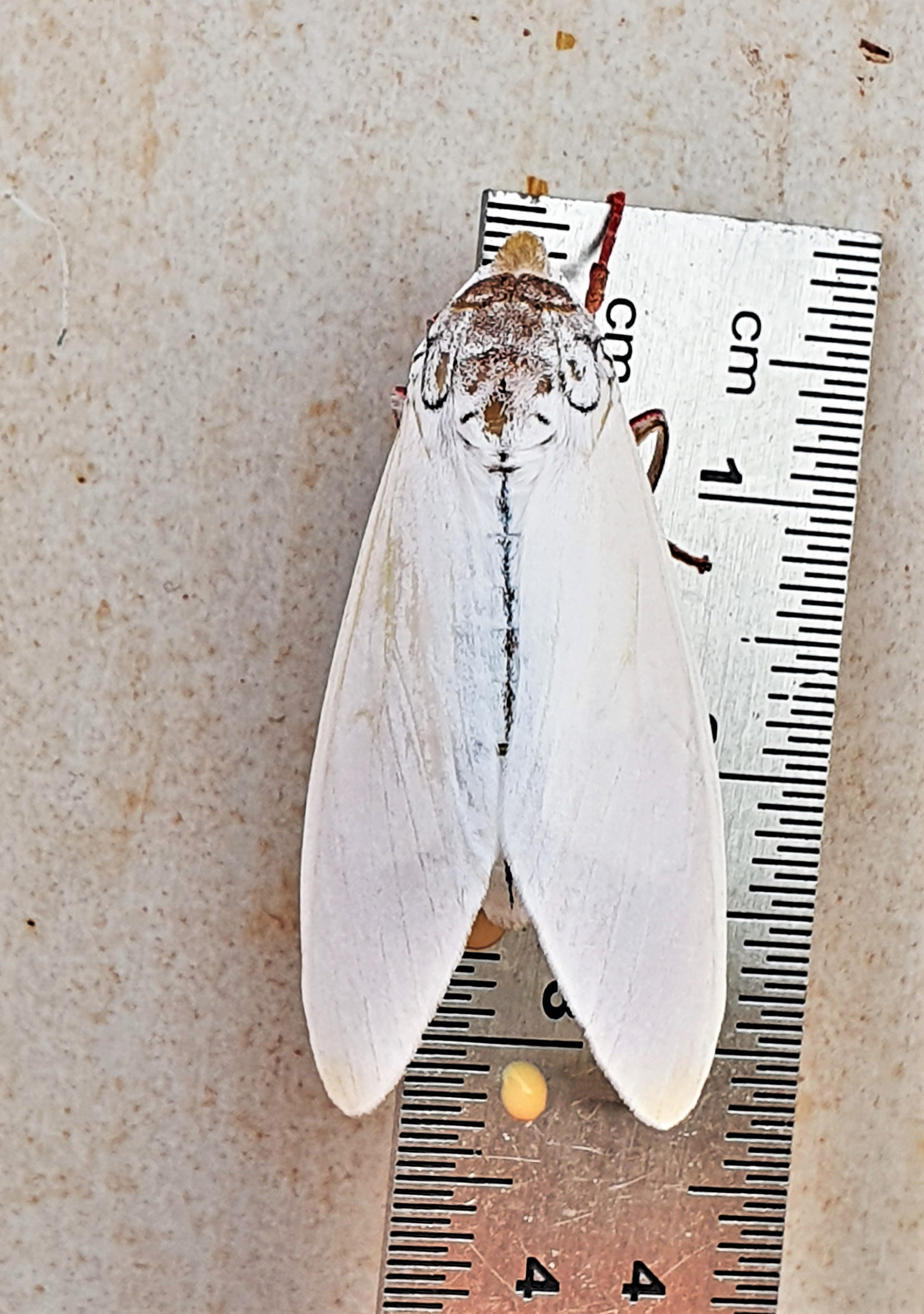

Scientific classification
- Domain: Eukaryota
- Kingdom: Animalia
- Phylum: Arthropoda
- Class: Insecta
- Order: Lepidoptera
- Superfamily: Noctuoidea
- Family: Erebidae
- Subfamily: Arctiinae
- Genus: Aphyarctia; Watson, 1975
- Species: A. surinamensis

Binomial name
- Aphyarctia surinamensis (Rothschild, 1911)

Synonyms
- Automolis surinamensis Rothschild, 1911

= Aphyarctia =

Aphyarctia surinamensis

Genus of moths

Aphyarctia is a monotypic moth genus in the family Erebidae. Its single species, Aphyarctia surinamensis, described by Walter Rothschild in 1911, is found in French Guiana, Suriname, Ecuador, and Bolivia.
