= Pithea =

Scientific classification
- Kingdom: Animalia
- Phylum: Arthropoda
- Class: Insecta
- Order: Lepidoptera
- Superfamily: Noctuoidea
- Family: Erebidae
- Subfamily: Arctiinae
- Genus: Pithea; Walker, 1856
- Species: P. ferruginea

Binomial name
- Pithea ferruginea Walker, 1856

Synonyms
- Opharus ferruginea

Genus of moths

Pithea is a monotypic moth genus in the family Erebidae. Its only species, Pithea ferruginea, is found in Colombia. Both the genus and species were first described by Francis Walker in 1856.
