= Hypidota =

Scientific classification
- Domain: Eukaryota
- Kingdom: Animalia
- Phylum: Arthropoda
- Class: Insecta
- Order: Lepidoptera
- Superfamily: Noctuoidea
- Family: Erebidae
- Subfamily: Arctiinae
- Genus: Hypidota; Schaus, 1904
- Species: H. neurias

Binomial name
- Hypidota neurias Schaus, 1904

Genus of moths

Hypidota is a monotypic moth genus in the family Erebidae. Its only species, Hypidota neurias, is found in Brazil. Both the genus and the species were first described by William Schaus in 1904.
