= Nyearctia =

Scientific classification
- Kingdom: Animalia
- Phylum: Arthropoda
- Class: Insecta
- Order: Lepidoptera
- Superfamily: Noctuoidea
- Family: Erebidae
- Subfamily: Arctiinae
- Genus: Nyearctia; Watson, 1975
- Species: N. leucoptera

Binomial name
- Nyearctia leucoptera (Hampson, 1920)

Synonyms
- Automolis leucoptera Hampson, 1920; Automolis albescens Rothschild, 1909 (preocc. Rothschild, 1910)

Genus of moths

Nyearctia is a monotypic moth genus in the family Erebidae described by Watson in 1975. Its only species, Nyearctia leucoptera, was first described by George Hampson in 1920. It is found in French Guiana, Suriname, Guyana and Venezuela.
