= Fasslia =

Scientific classification
- Domain: Eukaryota
- Kingdom: Animalia
- Phylum: Arthropoda
- Class: Insecta
- Order: Lepidoptera
- Superfamily: Noctuoidea
- Family: Erebidae
- Subfamily: Arctiinae
- Genus: Fasslia; Dognin, 1911
- Species: F. hampsoni

Binomial name
- Fasslia hampsoni Dognin, 1911

Genus of moths

Fasslia is a monotypic moth genus in the family Erebidae. Its only species, Fasslia hampsoni, is found in Colombia. Both the genus and the species were first described by Paul Dognin in 1911.
