= Nezula =

Scientific classification
- Domain: Eukaryota
- Kingdom: Animalia
- Phylum: Arthropoda
- Class: Insecta
- Order: Lepidoptera
- Superfamily: Noctuoidea
- Family: Erebidae
- Subfamily: Arctiinae
- Genus: Nezula; Schaus, 1896
- Species: N. grisea

Binomial name
- Nezula grisea Schaus, 1896

Genus of moths

Nezula is a monotypic moth genus in the family Erebidae. Its only species, Nezula grisea, is found in French Guiana, Venezuela, Suriname, Panama, Upper Amazonas and Ecuador. Both the genus and species were first described by William Schaus in 1896.
