= Laguerreia =

Scientific classification
- Kingdom: Animalia
- Phylum: Arthropoda
- Class: Insecta
- Order: Lepidoptera
- Superfamily: Noctuoidea
- Family: Erebidae
- Subfamily: Arctiinae
- Genus: Laguerreia; Toulgoët, 2000
- Species: L. inexpectata

Binomial name
- Laguerreia inexpectata Toulgoët, 2000

Genus of moths

Laguerreia is a monotypic moth genus in the family Erebidae. Its only species, Laguerreia inexpectata, is found in Bolivia. Both the genus and species were first described by Hervé de Toulgoët in 2000.
