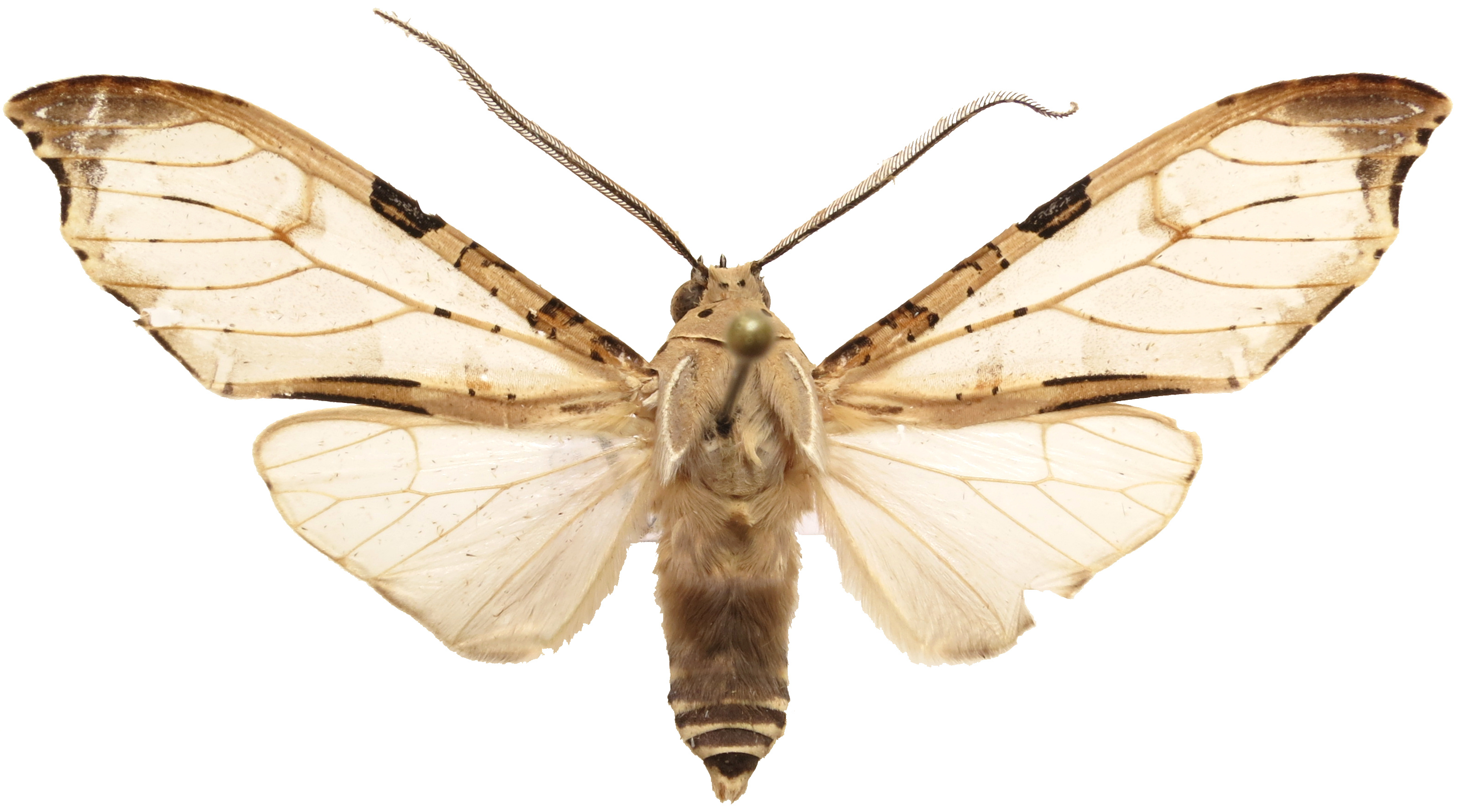
- Psychophasma erosa - French Guiana

Scientific classification
- Domain: Eukaryota
- Kingdom: Animalia
- Phylum: Arthropoda
- Class: Insecta
- Order: Lepidoptera
- Superfamily: Noctuoidea
- Family: Erebidae
- Subfamily: Arctiinae
- Genus: Psychophasma; Butler, 1878
- Species: P. erosa

Binomial name
- Psychophasma erosa (Herrich-Schäffer, [1858])

Synonyms
- Halysidota erosa Herrich-Schäffer, [1858]; Halesidota albidator Walker, [1865]; Halesidota vitripennis Walker, 1869

= Psychophasma =

Genus of moths

Psychophasma is a monotypic moth genus in the family Erebidae erected by Arthur Gardiner Butler in 1878. Its only species, Psychophasma erosa, was first described by Gottlieb August Wilhelm Herrich-Schäffer in 1858. It is found in Guatemala, Costa Rica, Mexico, Nicaragua, Panama, Ecuador, Venezuela, Suriname, French Guiana, Guyana, Brazil, Bolivia, Colombia and Peru.
