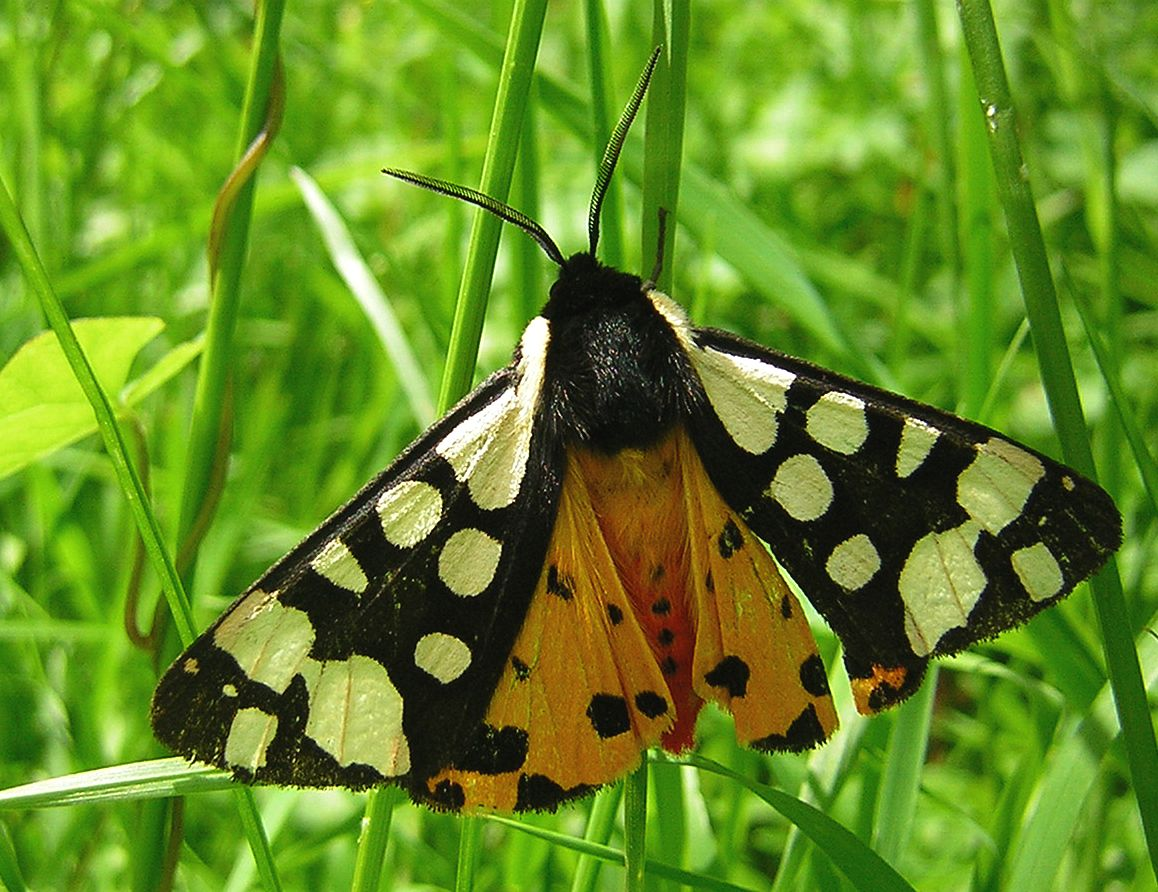
- Arctia villica

Scientific classification
- Kingdom: Animalia
- Phylum: Arthropoda
- Clade: Pancrustacea
- Class: Insecta
- Order: Lepidoptera
- Superfamily: Noctuoidea
- Family: Erebidae
- Subfamily: Arctiinae
- Tribe: Arctiini
- Subtribe: Arctiina; Leach, [1815]

= Arctiina =

Subtribe of moths

The Arctiina are a subtribe of moths in the family Erebidae.

== Taxonomy ==
The subtribe was previously treated as a higher-level taxon, the tribe Arctiini, within the lichen and tiger moth family Arctiidae. The ranks of the family and its subdivisions were lowered in a recent reclassification while keeping the contents of the family and its subdivisions largely unchanged. These changes in rank triggered changes in the suffixes in the names. The family Arctiidae as a whole was reclassified as the subfamily Arctiinae within the family Erebidae. The original subfamilies were lowered to tribes, and the original tribe Arctiini was lowered to subtribe status as Arctiina. Thus the name "Arctiini" used to refer to the subtribe that is the topic of this article, but now that name refers to the tribe that includes this subtribe.

== Genera ==
As a result of research published in 2016 by Rönkä et al., 33 genera of Arctiina were determined to be new taxonomic synonyms of 5 genera, leaving the following genera (in bold below) in the subtribe.

Apantesis Walker, 1855
= Grammia Rambur, 1866
= Holarctia Smith, 1938
= Mimarctia Neumoegen & Dyar, 1894
= Notarctia Smith, 1938
= Orodemnias Wallengren, 1885

Chelis Rambur, 1866
= Centrarctia Dubatolov, 1992
= Holoarctia Ferguson, 1984
= Hyperborea Grum-Grshimailo, 1900
= Neoarctia Neumoegen & Dyar, 1893
= Palearctia Ferguson, 1984
= Sibirarctia Dubatolov, 1987
= Tancrea Püngeler, 1898

Diacrisia Hübner, [1819] 1816
= Rhyparia Hübner [1820] 1816
= Rhyparioides Butler, 1877

Micrarctia Seitz, 1910

Arctia Schrank, 1802
= Acerbia Sotavalta, 1963
= Ammobiota Wallengren, 1855
= Atlantarctia Dubatolov, 1990
= Borearctia Dubatolov, 1984
= Callarctia Packard, 1864
= Chionophila Guenée 1865
= Epicallia Hübner, 1816
= Eucharia Hübner, 1816
= Eupsychoma Grote, 1865
= Eyprepia Ochsenheimer, 1810
= Gonerda Moore, 1879
= Hyphoraia Hübner, 1816
= Nemeophila Stephens, 1828
= Oroncus Seitz, 1910
= Pararctia Sotavalta, 1965
= Parasemia Hübner, 1816
= Pericallia Hübner 1816
= Platarctia Packard, 1864
= Platyprepia Dyar, 1897
= Preparctia Hampson, 1901
= Sinoarctia Dubatolov, 1987
= Zoote Hübner, 1816

== Other genera that might belong to another tribes ==
- Chlorhoda
- Chlorocrisia
- Hiera
- Hypomolis
- Lafajana
- Leichosila
- Mallocephala
- Metacrisiodes
- Palaeomolis
- Pseudalus
- Venedictoffia

Euerythra and Kodiosoma are now in Phaegopterina.
