= Zatrephes =

Scientific classification
- Kingdom: Animalia
- Phylum: Arthropoda
- Clade: Pancrustacea
- Class: Insecta
- Order: Lepidoptera
- Superfamily: Noctuoidea
- Family: Erebidae
- Subfamily: Arctiinae
- Subtribe: Phaegopterina
- Genus: Zatrephes; Hübner, [1819]

Synonyms
- Ennomomima Toulgoët, 1991

Genus of moths

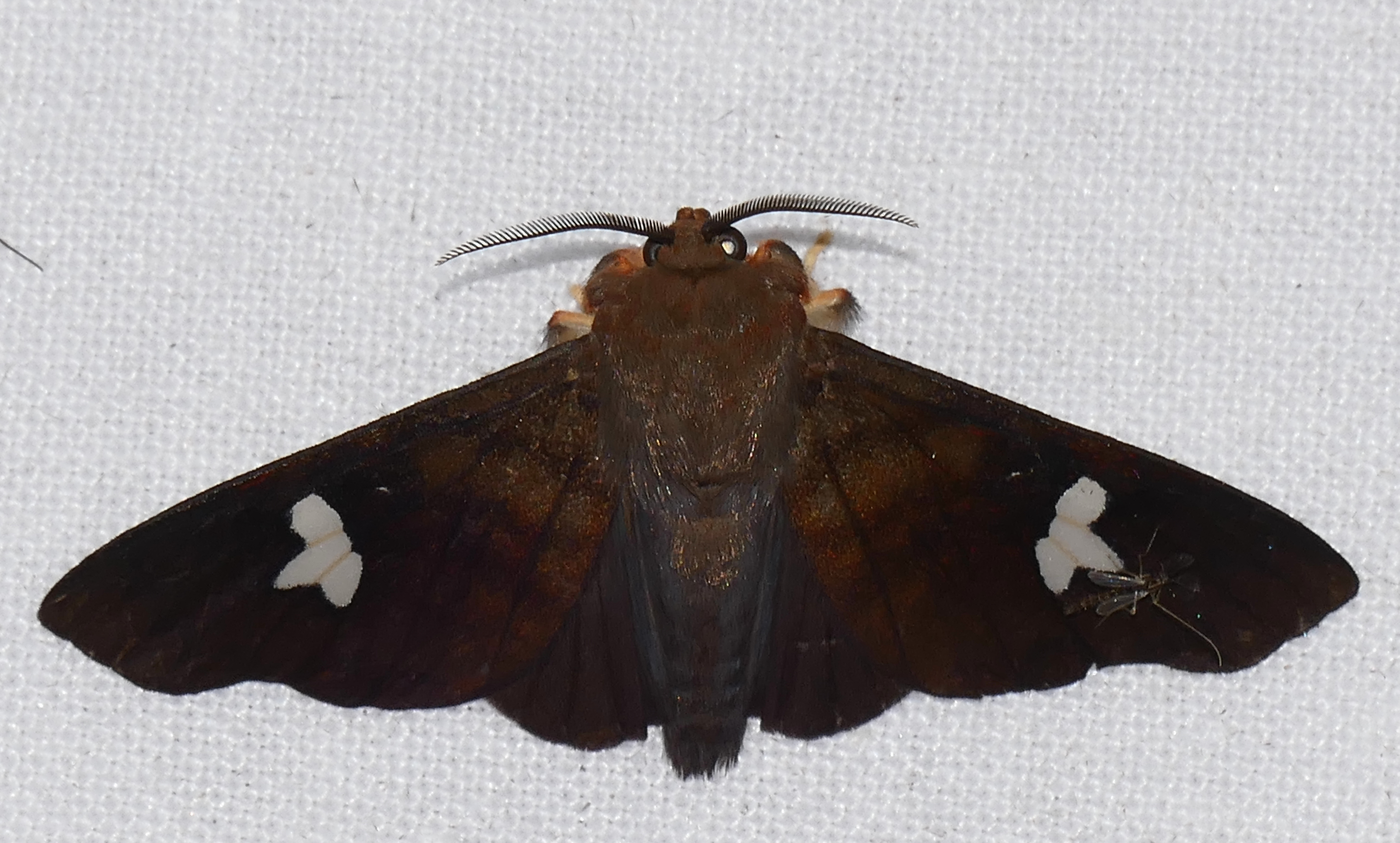
Arctiidae Moth

Zatrephes is a genus of moths in the family Erebidae. The genus was erected by Jacob Hübner in 1819. It was formerly considered part of the Arctiidae. It includes the former genus Ennomomima, which is now considered a synonym.

== Species ==
With the synonymisation of Ennomomima, Zatrephes comprises the following species:

- Zatrephes afenestrata Toulgoët, 1987
- Zatrephes albescens Rothschild, 1909
- Zatrephes amoena Dognin, 1924
- Zatrephes arenosa Schaus, 1905
- Zatrephes atrata Rothschild, 1910
- Zatrephes bicolorata (H. Druce, 1906)
- Zatrephes bilineata Rothschild, 1909
- Zatrephes binotata Rothschild, 1909
- Zatrephes brunnea Rothschild, 1909
- Zatrephes carmesina Rothschild, 1909
- Zatrephes cardytera Dyar, 1910
- Zatrephes crocos (Cramer, [1777])
- Zatrephes cruciata Rothschild, 1909
- Zatrephes dichroma Toulgoët, [1990]
- Zatrephes dithyris Hampson, 1905
- Zatrephes duraneli (Toulgoët, 1991)
- Zatrephes elegans Toulgoët, 1987
- Zatrephes fallax Dognin, 1923
- Zatrephes fasciola Seitz, 1922
- Zatrephes flavida Hampson, 1905
- Zatrephes flavipuncta Rothschild, 1909
- Zatrephes foliacea Rothschild, 1909
- Zatrephes funebris Toulgoët, 1987
- Zatrephes gigantea Rothschild, 1909
- Zatrephes griseorufa Rothschild, 1909
- Zatrephes haxairei Toulgoët, [1990]
- Zatrephes iridescens Rothschild, 1910
- Zatrephes irrorata Rothschild, 1909
- Zatrephes klagesi Rothschild, 1909
- Zatrephes krugeri Reich, 1934
- Zatrephes lentiginosus Rothschild, 1917
- Zatrephes magnifenestra Bryk, 1953
- Zatrephes marmorata Toulgoët, 1987
- Zatrephes miniata Rothschild, 1909
- Zatrephes mirabilis (Toulgoët, [1990])
- Zatrephes modesta Schaus, 1905
- Zatrephes mossi Rothschild, 1933
- Zatrephes nitida (Cramer, [1780])
- Zatrephes novicia Schaus, 1921
- Zatrephes ockendeni Rothschild, 1909
- Zatrephes olivenca Dognin, 1923
- Zatrephes ossea Schaus, 1905
- Zatrephes propinqua Rothschild, 1909
- Zatrephes rosacea Rothschild, 1909
- Zatrephes rosella Rothschild, 1917
- Zatrephes rufescens Rothschild, 1909
- Zatrephes subflavescens Rothschild, 1909
- Zatrephes toulgoetana (Laguerre, 2005)
- Zatrephes trailii Butler, 1877
- Zatrephes trilineata Hampson, 1905
- Zatrephes varicolor Toulgoët, 1987
- Zatrephes variegata Rothschild, 1909

== Former species ==
- Zatrephes flavonotata Rothschild, 1909, now Epimolis flavonotata.
- Zatrephes ignota Schaus, 1921, synonym of Zatrephes cardytera.
- Zatrephes pseudopraemolis Rothschild, 1909, now Epimolis pseudopraemolis.
