= Hiera (mythology) =

In Greek mythology, Hiera (Ancient Greek: Ἱέρα) is the wife of Telephus, the mythic founder of the city of Pergamum. She is depicted in the frieze on the interior of the Altar of Pergamum.

== Mythology ==
During the Trojan War the Greeks attacked Pergamum, either because they mistook it for Troy, or because an alliance existed between Troy and Pergamum. Hiera united a cavalry of Mysian women to repel the attack. However, in the battle Hiera was killed by the Greek warrior Nireus. According to Tzetzes, she was more beautiful than Helen. Telephus was so grief-stricken that he called a cease-fire to hold the funeral for Hiera, before restarting the battle and finally driving the invaders away.

It is possible that the ancient city of Hierapolis (modern Pamukkale, Turkey) was named in her honor, though the name can also be read as just 'holy city'. She had two sons with Telephus, Tarchon and Tyrsenus.

== See also ==
- 7119 Hiera, Jovian asteroid
- Hiera a genus of moths
