= Zatrephes klagesi =

Scientific classification
- Kingdom: Animalia
- Phylum: Arthropoda
- Class: Insecta
- Order: Lepidoptera
- Superfamily: Noctuoidea
- Family: Erebidae
- Subfamily: Arctiinae
- Genus: Zatrephes
- Species: Z. klagesi

Binomial name
- Zatrephes klagesi Rothschild, 1909

Species of moth

Zatrephes klagesi is a moth in the family Erebidae. It was described by Walter Rothschild in 1909. It is found in Brazil.
