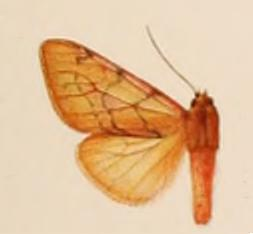

Scientific classification
- Kingdom: Animalia
- Phylum: Arthropoda
- Class: Insecta
- Order: Lepidoptera
- Superfamily: Noctuoidea
- Family: Erebidae
- Subfamily: Arctiinae
- Genus: Palaeomolis
- Species: P. purpurascens

Binomial name
- Palaeomolis purpurascens Hampson, 1909

= Palaeomolis purpurascens =

Species of moth

Palaeomolis purpurascens is a moth of the subfamily Arctiinae first described by George Hampson in 1909. It is found in south-eastern Peru.
