= Zatrephes novicia =

Scientific classification
- Kingdom: Animalia
- Phylum: Arthropoda
- Class: Insecta
- Order: Lepidoptera
- Superfamily: Noctuoidea
- Family: Erebidae
- Subfamily: Arctiinae
- Genus: Zatrephes
- Species: Z. novicia

Binomial name
- Zatrephes novicia Schaus, 1921

Synonyms
- Zatrephes rufobrunnea Rothschild, 1909; Zatrephes f. extensa Gaede, 1928

Species of moth

Zatrephes novicia is a moth in the family Erebidae. It was described by William Schaus in 1921. It is found in French Guiana and Brazil.

== Subspecies ==
- Zatrephes novicia novicia (French Guiana)
- Zatrephes novicia rufobrunnea Rothschild, 1909 (Brazil)
