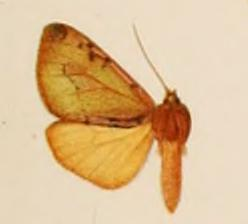

Scientific classification
- Domain: Eukaryota
- Kingdom: Animalia
- Phylum: Arthropoda
- Class: Insecta
- Order: Lepidoptera
- Superfamily: Noctuoidea
- Family: Erebidae
- Subfamily: Arctiinae
- Genus: Palaeomolis
- Species: P. hampsoni

Binomial name
- Palaeomolis hampsoni Rothschild, 1910

= Palaeomolis hampsoni =

Species of moth

Palaeomolis hampsoni is a moth of the subfamily Arctiinae first described by Rothschild in 1910. It is found in Peru.
