= Chlorhoda superba =

Scientific classification
- Kingdom: Animalia
- Phylum: Arthropoda
- Class: Insecta
- Order: Lepidoptera
- Superfamily: Noctuoidea
- Family: Erebidae
- Subfamily: Arctiinae
- Genus: Chlorhoda
- Species: C. superba

Binomial name
- Chlorhoda superba Toulgoët & Goodger, 1985

Species of moth

Chlorhoda superba is a moth of the subfamily Arctiinae first described by Hervé de Toulgoët and David T. Goodger in 1985. It is found in Peru.
