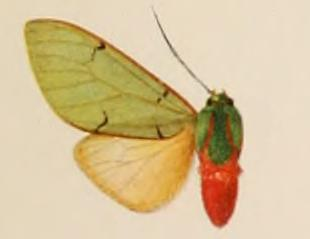
- Chloroda thoracica

Scientific classification
- Kingdom: Animalia
- Phylum: Arthropoda
- Class: Insecta
- Order: Lepidoptera
- Superfamily: Noctuoidea
- Family: Erebidae
- Subfamily: Arctiinae
- Subtribe: Arctiina
- Genus: Chlorhoda; Hampson, 1901

= Chlorhoda =

Genus of moths

Chlorhoda is a genus of moths in the subfamily Arctiinae erected by George Hampson in 1901.

== Species ==
- Chlorhoda albolimbata
- Chlorhoda amabilis
- Chlorhoda metaleuca
- Chlorhoda metamelaena
- Chlorhoda pallens
- Chlorhoda rubricosta
- Chlorhoda rufolivacea
- Chlorhoda rufoviridis
- Chlorhoda superba
- Chlorhoda thoracica
- Chlorhoda tricolor
- Chlorhoda viridis
