= Palaeomolis rubescens =

Scientific classification
- Kingdom: Animalia
- Phylum: Arthropoda
- Class: Insecta
- Order: Lepidoptera
- Superfamily: Noctuoidea
- Family: Erebidae
- Subfamily: Arctiinae
- Genus: Palaeomolis
- Species: P. rubescens

Binomial name
- Palaeomolis rubescens Toulgoët, 1983

Species of moth

Palaeomolis rubescens is a moth of the subfamily Arctiinae. It was described by Hervé de Toulgoët in 1983. It is found in Ecuador.
