= Zatrephes ossea =

Scientific classification
- Kingdom: Animalia
- Phylum: Arthropoda
- Class: Insecta
- Order: Lepidoptera
- Superfamily: Noctuoidea
- Family: Erebidae
- Subfamily: Arctiinae
- Genus: Zatrephes
- Species: Z. ossea

Binomial name
- Zatrephes ossea Schaus, 1905

Synonyms
- Zatrephes bifasciata Rothschild, 1933

Species of moth

Zatrephes ossea is a moth in the family Erebidae. It was described by William Schaus in 1905. It is found in French Guiana.
