= Chlorhoda albolimbata =

Flashing footman

Scientific classification
- Kingdom: Animalia
- Phylum: Arthropoda
- Class: Insecta
- Order: Lepidoptera
- Superfamily: Noctuoidea
- Family: Erebidae
- Subfamily: Arctiinae
- Genus: Chlorhoda
- Species: C. albolimbata

Binomial name
- Chlorhoda albolimbata Toulgoët & Goodger, 1985

Species of moth

Chlorhoda albolimbata, the flashing footman, is a moth of the subfamily Arctiinae. The species was first described by Hervé de Toulgoët and David T. Goodger in 1985 and it is found in Peru.
