= Zatrephes haxairei =

Scientific classification
- Kingdom: Animalia
- Phylum: Arthropoda
- Class: Insecta
- Order: Lepidoptera
- Superfamily: Noctuoidea
- Family: Erebidae
- Subfamily: Arctiinae
- Genus: Zatrephes
- Species: Z. haxairei

Binomial name
- Zatrephes haxairei Toulgoët, [1990]

Species of moth

Zatrephes haxairei is a moth of the family Erebidae. It was first described by Hervé de Toulgoët in 1990. It is found in Ecuador.
