= Mallocephala rubripes =

Scientific classification
- Kingdom: Animalia
- Phylum: Arthropoda
- Class: Insecta
- Order: Lepidoptera
- Superfamily: Noctuoidea
- Family: Erebidae
- Subfamily: Arctiinae
- Genus: Mallocephala
- Species: M. rubripes

Binomial name
- Mallocephala rubripes Blanchard, 1852

Synonyms
- Fuligoptera rubripes; Antartctia rhodosoma Hampson, 1907

Species of moth

Mallocephala rubripes is a moth in subfamily Arctiinae first described by Émile Blanchard in 1852. It is found in Chile.

== Subspecies ==
- Mallocephala rubripes rubripes
- Mallocephala rubripes bifurcata (Ruiz, 1989)
- Mallocephala rubripes brevisaccus (Ruiz, 1989)
- Mallocephala rubripes clerica (Ruiz, 1989)
