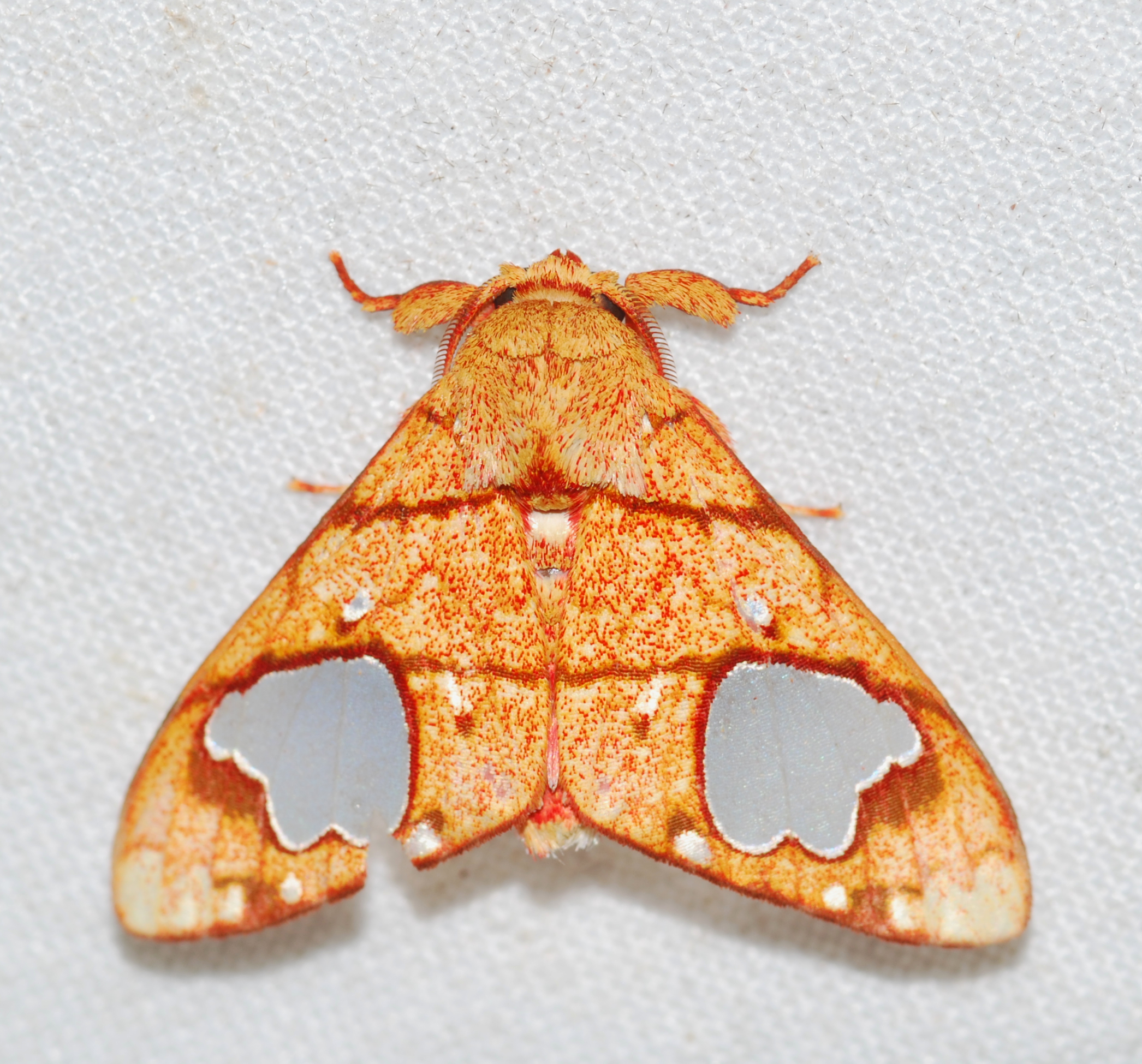

Scientific classification
- Kingdom: Animalia
- Phylum: Arthropoda
- Class: Insecta
- Order: Lepidoptera
- Superfamily: Noctuoidea
- Family: Erebidae
- Subfamily: Arctiinae
- Genus: Zatrephes
- Species: Z. trailii

Binomial name
- Zatrephes trailii Butler, 1877

= Zatrephes trailii =

Species of moth

Zatrephes trailii is a moth in the family Erebidae. It was described by Arthur Gardiner Butler in 1877. It is found in French Guiana, Venezuela and Brazil.
