= Pseudalus affinis =

Scientific classification
- Domain: Eukaryota
- Kingdom: Animalia
- Phylum: Arthropoda
- Class: Insecta
- Order: Lepidoptera
- Superfamily: Noctuoidea
- Family: Erebidae
- Subfamily: Arctiinae
- Genus: Pseudalus
- Species: P. affinis

Binomial name
- Pseudalus affinis Rothschild, 1933

Species of moth

Pseudalus affinis is a moth in the subfamily Arctiinae. It was described by Rothschild in 1933. It is found in French Guiana.
