= Pseudalus leos =

Scientific classification
- Domain: Eukaryota
- Kingdom: Animalia
- Phylum: Arthropoda
- Class: Insecta
- Order: Lepidoptera
- Superfamily: Noctuoidea
- Family: Erebidae
- Subfamily: Arctiinae
- Genus: Pseudalus
- Species: P. leos

Binomial name
- Pseudalus leos (H. Druce, 1898)

Synonyms
- Idalus leos H. Druce, 1898

Species of moth

Pseudalus leos is a moth in the subfamily Arctiinae. It was described by Herbert Druce in 1898. It is found in Ecuador and Peru.

== Subspecies ==
- Pseudalus leos leos (Ecuador)
- Pseudalus leos occidentalis Rothschild, 1909 (Peru)
