= Zatrephes fallax =

Scientific classification
- Kingdom: Animalia
- Phylum: Arthropoda
- Class: Insecta
- Order: Lepidoptera
- Superfamily: Noctuoidea
- Family: Erebidae
- Subfamily: Arctiinae
- Genus: Zatrephes
- Species: Z. fallax

Binomial name
- Zatrephes fallax Dognin, 1923

Species of moth

Zatrephes fallax is a moth of the family Erebidae. It was described by Paul Dognin in 1923. It is found in Brazil and French Guiana.
