= Zatrephes rufescens =

Scientific classification
- Kingdom: Animalia
- Phylum: Arthropoda
- Class: Insecta
- Order: Lepidoptera
- Superfamily: Noctuoidea
- Family: Erebidae
- Subfamily: Arctiinae
- Genus: Zatrephes
- Species: Z. rufescens

Binomial name
- Zatrephes rufescens Rothschild, 1909

Species of moth

Zatrephes rufescens is a moth in the family Erebidae. It was described by Walter Rothschild in 1909. It is found in Brazil, French Guiana and Suriname.The genus was erected by Jacob Hübner in 1819. It was formerly considered part of the Arctiidae
