= Zatrephes krugeri =

Scientific classification
- Kingdom: Animalia
- Phylum: Arthropoda
- Class: Insecta
- Order: Lepidoptera
- Superfamily: Noctuoidea
- Family: Erebidae
- Subfamily: Arctiinae
- Genus: Zatrephes
- Species: Z. krugeri

Binomial name
- Zatrephes krugeri Reich, 1934

Species of moth

Zatrephes krugeri is a moth in the family Erebidae. It was described by Reich in 1934. It is found in Brazil.
