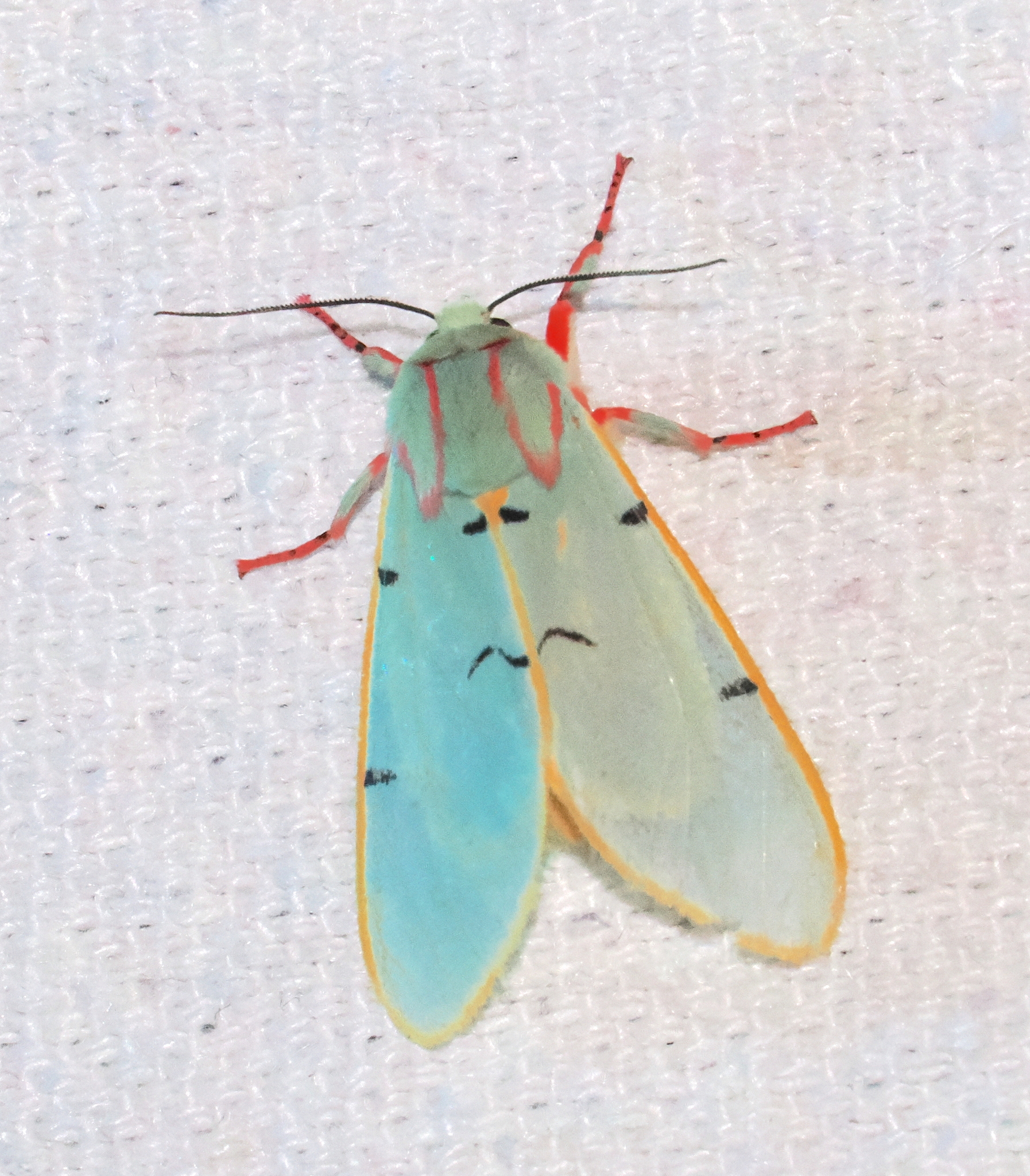

Scientific classification
- Kingdom: Animalia
- Phylum: Arthropoda
- Class: Insecta
- Order: Lepidoptera
- Superfamily: Noctuoidea
- Family: Erebidae
- Subfamily: Arctiinae
- Genus: Chlorhoda
- Species: C. viridis

Binomial name
- Chlorhoda viridis (H. Druce, 1909)

Synonyms
- Idalus viridis H. Druce, 1909

= Chlorhoda viridis =

Species of moth

Chlorhoda viridis is a moth of the subfamily Arctiinae first described by Herbert Druce in 1909. It is found in eastern Peru.
