= Epimolis arcifera =

Scientific classification
- Domain: Eukaryota
- Kingdom: Animalia
- Phylum: Arthropoda
- Class: Insecta
- Order: Lepidoptera
- Superfamily: Noctuoidea
- Family: Erebidae
- Subfamily: Arctiinae
- Genus: Epimolis
- Species: E. arcifera

Binomial name
- Epimolis arcifera (Dognin, 1912)

Synonyms
- Neonerita arcifera Dognin, 1912

Species of moth

Epimolis arcifera is a moth of the family Erebidae. It was described by Paul Dognin in 1912. It is found in Colombia.
