= Palaeomolis metarhoda =

Scientific classification
- Domain: Eukaryota
- Kingdom: Animalia
- Phylum: Arthropoda
- Class: Insecta
- Order: Lepidoptera
- Superfamily: Noctuoidea
- Family: Erebidae
- Subfamily: Arctiinae
- Genus: Palaeomolis
- Species: P. metarhoda

Binomial name
- Palaeomolis metarhoda (Dognin, 1910)

Synonyms
- Hypomolis metarhoda Dognin, 1910

Species of moth

Palaeomolis metarhoda is a moth of the subfamily Arctiinae. It was described by Paul Dognin in 1910. It is found in Ecuador.
