= Metacrisiodes =

Scientific classification
- Kingdom: Animalia
- Phylum: Arthropoda
- Class: Insecta
- Order: Lepidoptera
- Superfamily: Noctuoidea
- Family: Erebidae
- Subfamily: Arctiinae
- Subtribe: Arctiina
- Genus: Metacrisiodes; Dyar, 1916
- Species: M. pua

Binomial name
- Metacrisiodes pua Dyar, 1916

Synonyms
- Generic: Exemasia Dyar, 1920; Specific: Exemasia ochropasa Dyar, 1920

Genus of moths

Metacrisiodes is a monotypic moth genus in the subfamily Arctiinae. Its only species, Metacrisiodes pua, is found in Mexico. Both the genus and species were first described by Harrison Gray Dyar Jr. in 1916.
