= Chlorhoda rubricosta =

Scientific classification
- Kingdom: Animalia
- Phylum: Arthropoda
- Class: Insecta
- Order: Lepidoptera
- Superfamily: Noctuoidea
- Family: Erebidae
- Subfamily: Arctiinae
- Genus: Chlorhoda
- Species: C. rubricosta

Binomial name
- Chlorhoda rubricosta (Dognin, 1889)

Synonyms
- Phragmatobia rubricosta Dognin, 1889; Palaeomolis rubricosta (Dognin, 1889)

Species of moth

Chlorhoda rubricosta is a moth of the subfamily Arctiinae first described by Paul Dognin in 1889. It is found in Ecuador.
