= Mallocephala =

Scientific classification
- Kingdom: Animalia
- Phylum: Arthropoda
- Class: Insecta
- Order: Lepidoptera
- Superfamily: Noctuoidea
- Family: Erebidae
- Subfamily: Arctiinae
- Subtribe: Arctiina
- Genus: Mallocephala; Blanchard, 1852

Synonyms
- Fuligoptera Ruiz-Rodriguez, 1989

Genus of moths

Mallocephala is a genus of moths in the subfamily Arctiinae. The genus was described by Blanchard in 1852. Both species are found in Chile.

== Species ==
- Mallocephala rubripes Blanchard, 1852
- Mallocephala fulvicollis (Hampson, 1905)
