= Zatrephes fasciola =

Scientific classification
- Kingdom: Animalia
- Phylum: Arthropoda
- Class: Insecta
- Order: Lepidoptera
- Superfamily: Noctuoidea
- Family: Erebidae
- Subfamily: Arctiinae
- Genus: Zatrephes
- Species: Z. fasciola

Binomial name
- Zatrephes fasciola Seitz, 1922

Species of moth

Zatrephes fasciola is a moth in the family Erebidae. It was described by Adalbert Seitz in 1922. It is found in Brazil.
