= Pseudalus =

Scientific classification
- Domain: Eukaryota
- Kingdom: Animalia
- Phylum: Arthropoda
- Class: Insecta
- Order: Lepidoptera
- Superfamily: Noctuoidea
- Family: Erebidae
- Subfamily: Arctiinae
- Tribe: Arctiini
- Genus: Pseudalus; Schaus, 1896

Genus of moths

Pseudalus is a genus of moths in the subfamily Arctiinae. The genus was described by William Schaus in 1896.

== Species ==
- Pseudalus affinis Rothschild, 1933
- Pseudalus aurantiacus Rothschild, 1909
- Pseudalus leos Druce, 1898
- Pseudalus limona Schaus, 1896
- Pseudalus salmonaceus Rothschild, 1909
- Pseudalus strigatus Rothschild, 1909

== Former species ==
- Pseudalus pseudidalus Rothschild, 1909
