= Zatrephes bilineata =

Scientific classification
- Kingdom: Animalia
- Phylum: Arthropoda
- Class: Insecta
- Order: Lepidoptera
- Superfamily: Noctuoidea
- Family: Erebidae
- Subfamily: Arctiinae
- Genus: Zatrephes
- Species: Z. bilineata

Binomial name
- Zatrephes bilineata Rothschild, 1909

Species of moth

Zatrephes bilineata is a moth of the family Erebidae. It was described by Walter Rothschild in 1909. It is found in Peru, Brazil and Colombia.
