= Epimolis affinis =

Scientific classification
- Domain: Eukaryota
- Kingdom: Animalia
- Phylum: Arthropoda
- Class: Insecta
- Order: Lepidoptera
- Superfamily: Noctuoidea
- Family: Erebidae
- Subfamily: Arctiinae
- Genus: Epimolis
- Species: E. affinis

Binomial name
- Epimolis affinis (Rothschild, 1909)

Synonyms
- Antaxia affinis Rothschild, 1909

Species of moth

Epimolis affinis is a moth of the family Erebidae. It was described by Walter Rothschild in 1909. It is found in French Guiana, Venezuela and Peru.
