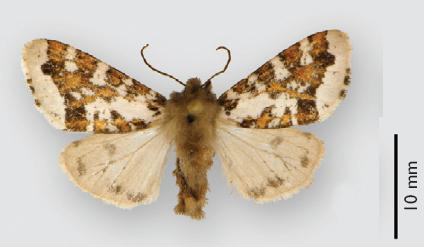
- Male

Scientific classification
- Kingdom: Animalia
- Phylum: Arthropoda
- Clade: Pancrustacea
- Class: Insecta
- Order: Lepidoptera
- Superfamily: Noctuoidea
- Family: Erebidae
- Subfamily: Arctiinae
- Genus: Leichosila
- Species: L. talamanca

Binomial name
- Leichosila talamanca Schmidt, 2009

= Leichosila talamanca =

Species of moth

Leichosila talamanca is a moth of the subfamily Arctiinae first described by Christian Schmidt in 2009. It is found in Cordillera de Talamanca, Costa Rica.

The forewing length is 15–16 mm.
