= Zatrephes iridescens =

Scientific classification
- Kingdom: Animalia
- Phylum: Arthropoda
- Class: Insecta
- Order: Lepidoptera
- Superfamily: Noctuoidea
- Family: Erebidae
- Subfamily: Arctiinae
- Genus: Zatrephes
- Species: Z. iridescens

Binomial name
- Zatrephes iridescens Rothschild, 1910

Synonyms
- Zatrephes nitida Rothschild, 1909 (preocc. Cramer, 1780); Zatrephes pura Dognin, 1921

Species of moth

Zatrephes iridescens is a moth in the family Erebidae. It was described by Walter Rothschild in 1910. It is found in French Guiana and Brazil.

== Subspecies ==
- Zatrephes iridescens iridescens (Brazil)
- Zatrephes iridescens pura Dognin, 1921 (French Guiana)
