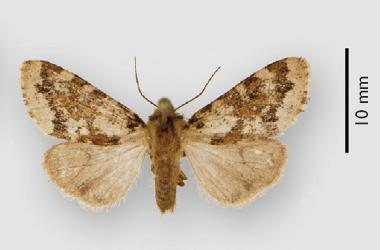
- Male

Scientific classification
- Domain: Eukaryota
- Kingdom: Animalia
- Phylum: Arthropoda
- Class: Insecta
- Order: Lepidoptera
- Superfamily: Noctuoidea
- Family: Erebidae
- Subfamily: Arctiinae
- Genus: Leichosila
- Species: L. wagneri

Binomial name
- Leichosila wagneri Schmidt, 2009

= Leichosila wagneri =

Species of moth

Leichosila wagneri is a moth of the subfamily Arctiinae first described by Christian Schmidt in 2009. It is only known from high-elevation forest (1,950 to 2,050 m) on Barva Volcano, Cordillera Central, Costa Rica.

The forewing length is about 13.5 mm.
