= Epimolis creon =

Scientific classification
- Domain: Eukaryota
- Kingdom: Animalia
- Phylum: Arthropoda
- Class: Insecta
- Order: Lepidoptera
- Superfamily: Noctuoidea
- Family: Erebidae
- Subfamily: Arctiinae
- Genus: Epimolis
- Species: E. creon

Binomial name
- Epimolis creon (H. Druce, 1897)

Synonyms
- Amaxia creon H. Druce, 1897; Symphlebia creon (H. Druce, 1897)

Species of moth

Epimolis creon is a moth of the family Erebidae. It was described by Herbert Druce in 1897. It is found in Mexico.
