= Zatrephes lentiginosus =

Scientific classification
- Kingdom: Animalia
- Phylum: Arthropoda
- Class: Insecta
- Order: Lepidoptera
- Superfamily: Noctuoidea
- Family: Erebidae
- Subfamily: Arctiinae
- Genus: Zatrephes
- Species: Z. lentiginosus

Binomial name
- Zatrephes lentiginosus Rothschild, 1917

Species of moth

Zatrephes lentiginosus is a moth in the family Erebidae. It was described by Walter Rothschild in 1917. It is found in French Guiana.
