= Zatrephes bicolorata =

Scientific classification
- Kingdom: Animalia
- Phylum: Arthropoda
- Class: Insecta
- Order: Lepidoptera
- Superfamily: Noctuoidea
- Family: Erebidae
- Subfamily: Arctiinae
- Genus: Zatrephes
- Species: Z. bicolorata

Binomial name
- Zatrephes bicolorata (H. Druce, 1906)

Synonyms
- Apatelodes bicolorata H. Druce, 1906; Zatrephes sublutescens Rothschild, 1909

Species of moth

Zatrephes bicolorata is a moth in the family Erebidae. It was described by Herbert Druce in 1906. It is found in Peru.
