= Zatrephes duraneli =

Scientific classification
- Kingdom: Animalia
- Phylum: Arthropoda
- Class: Insecta
- Order: Lepidoptera
- Superfamily: Noctuoidea
- Family: Erebidae
- Subfamily: Arctiinae
- Genus: Zatrephes
- Species: Z. duraneli

Binomial name
- Zatrephes duraneli (Toulgoët, 1991)

Synonyms
- Ennomomima duraneli Toulgoët, 1991

Species of moth

Zatrephes duraneli is a moth of the family Erebidae. It was described by Hervé de Toulgoët in 1991. It is found in French Guiana.
