= Zatrephes rosacea =

Scientific classification
- Kingdom: Animalia
- Phylum: Arthropoda
- Class: Insecta
- Order: Lepidoptera
- Superfamily: Noctuoidea
- Family: Erebidae
- Subfamily: Arctiinae
- Genus: Zatrephes
- Species: Z. rosacea

Binomial name
- Zatrephes rosacea Rothschild, 1909

Species of moth

Zatrephes rosacea is a moth in the family Erebidae. It was described by Walter Rothschild in 1909. It is found in French Guiana and Brazil.
