= Lafajana =

Scientific classification
- Kingdom: Animalia
- Phylum: Arthropoda
- Class: Insecta
- Order: Lepidoptera
- Superfamily: Noctuoidea
- Family: Erebidae
- Subfamily: Arctiinae
- Subtribe: Arctiina
- Genus: Lafajana; Dognin, 1891
- Species: L. cupra

Binomial name
- Lafajana cupra Dognin, 1891

Genus of moths

Lafajana is a monotypic moth genus in the subfamily Arctiinae. Its single species, Lafajana cupra, is found in Ecuador. Both the genus and species were first described by Paul Dognin in 1891.
