= Zatrephes dichroma =

Scientific classification
- Kingdom: Animalia
- Phylum: Arthropoda
- Class: Insecta
- Order: Lepidoptera
- Superfamily: Noctuoidea
- Family: Erebidae
- Subfamily: Arctiinae
- Genus: Zatrephes
- Species: Z. dichroma

Binomial name
- Zatrephes dichroma Toulgoët, 1989

Species of moth

Zatrephes dichroma is a moth of the family Erebidae. It was described by Hervé de Toulgoët in 1989. It is found in Ecuador.
