= Chlorhoda metamelaena =

Scientific classification
- Kingdom: Animalia
- Phylum: Arthropoda
- Class: Insecta
- Order: Lepidoptera
- Superfamily: Noctuoidea
- Family: Erebidae
- Subfamily: Arctiinae
- Genus: Chlorhoda
- Species: C. metamelaena

Binomial name
- Chlorhoda metamelaena Dognin, 1913

Species of moth

Chlorhoda metamelaena is a moth of the subfamily Arctiinae first described by Paul Dognin in 1913. It is found in Colombia.
