= Zatrephes elegans =

Scientific classification
- Kingdom: Animalia
- Phylum: Arthropoda
- Class: Insecta
- Order: Lepidoptera
- Superfamily: Noctuoidea
- Family: Erebidae
- Subfamily: Arctiinae
- Genus: Zatrephes
- Species: Z. elegans

Binomial name
- Zatrephes elegans Toulgoët, 1987

Species of moth

Zatrephes elegans is a moth of the family Erebidae. It was described by Hervé de Toulgoët in 1987. It is found in French Guiana.
