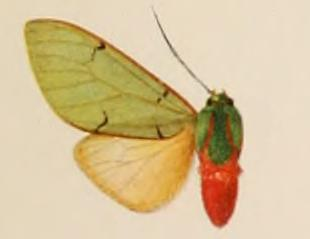
- Male
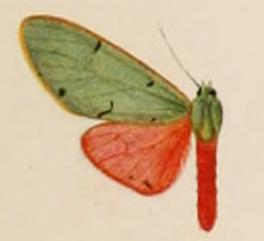
- Female

Scientific classification
- Kingdom: Animalia
- Phylum: Arthropoda
- Class: Insecta
- Order: Lepidoptera
- Superfamily: Noctuoidea
- Family: Erebidae
- Subfamily: Arctiinae
- Genus: Chlorhoda
- Species: C. thoracica

Binomial name
- Chlorhoda thoracica Rothschild, 1910

= Chlorhoda thoracica =

Species of moth

Chlorhoda thoracica is a moth of the subfamily Arctiinae first described by Walter Rothschild in 1910. It is found in Peru.

The wingspan is about 39 mm.
