= Chlorhoda rufolivacea =

Scientific classification
- Kingdom: Animalia
- Phylum: Arthropoda
- Class: Insecta
- Order: Lepidoptera
- Superfamily: Noctuoidea
- Family: Erebidae
- Subfamily: Arctiinae
- Genus: Chlorhoda
- Species: C. rufolivacea

Binomial name
- Chlorhoda rufolivacea Seitz, 1919

Synonyms
- Palaeomolis rufolivacea (Seitz, 1919)

Species of moth

Chlorhoda rufolivacea is a moth of the subfamily Arctiinae first described by Seitz in 1919. It is found in Colombia.
