= Chlorhoda metaleuca =

Scientific classification
- Kingdom: Animalia
- Phylum: Arthropoda
- Class: Insecta
- Order: Lepidoptera
- Superfamily: Noctuoidea
- Family: Erebidae
- Subfamily: Arctiinae
- Genus: Chlorhoda
- Species: C. metaleuca

Binomial name
- Chlorhoda metaleuca Schaus, 1912

Species of moth

Chlorhoda metaleuca is a moth of the subfamily Arctiinae first described by William Schaus in 1912. It is found in Costa Rica.
