= Pseudalus limona =

Scientific classification
- Domain: Eukaryota
- Kingdom: Animalia
- Phylum: Arthropoda
- Class: Insecta
- Order: Lepidoptera
- Superfamily: Noctuoidea
- Family: Erebidae
- Subfamily: Arctiinae
- Genus: Pseudalus
- Species: P. limona

Binomial name
- Pseudalus limona Schaus, 1896

Synonyms
- Pseudalus limonia Hampson, 1901

Species of moth

Pseudalus limona is a moth in the subfamily Arctiinae. It was described by William Schaus in 1896. It is found in Brazil.
