= Palaeomolis lemairei =

Scientific classification
- Kingdom: Animalia
- Phylum: Arthropoda
- Clade: Pancrustacea
- Class: Insecta
- Order: Lepidoptera
- Superfamily: Noctuoidea
- Family: Erebidae
- Subfamily: Arctiinae
- Genus: Palaeomolis
- Species: P. lemairei

Binomial name
- Palaeomolis lemairei Toulgoët, 1984

Species of moth

Palaeomolis lemairei is a moth of the subfamily Arctiinae. It was described by Hervé de Toulgoët in 1984. It is found in Ecuador.
