= Chlorhoda rufoviridis =

Scientific classification
- Kingdom: Animalia
- Phylum: Arthropoda
- Class: Insecta
- Order: Lepidoptera
- Superfamily: Noctuoidea
- Family: Erebidae
- Subfamily: Arctiinae
- Genus: Chlorhoda
- Species: C. rufoviridis

Binomial name
- Chlorhoda rufoviridis (Walker, [1865])

Synonyms
- Idalus rufoviridis Walker, [1865]

Species of moth

Chlorhoda rufoviridis is a moth of the subfamily Arctiinae first described by Francis Walker in 1865. It is found in Colombia and Peru.
