= Zatrephes trilineata =

Scientific classification
- Kingdom: Animalia
- Phylum: Arthropoda
- Class: Insecta
- Order: Lepidoptera
- Superfamily: Noctuoidea
- Family: Erebidae
- Subfamily: Arctiinae
- Genus: Zatrephes
- Species: Z. trilineata

Binomial name
- Zatrephes trilineata Hampson, 1905

Species of moth

Zatrephes trilineata is a moth of the family Erebidae. It was described by George Hampson in 1905. It is found in French Guiana, Suriname and Peru.

== Subspecies ==
- Ennomomima trilineata trilineata (French Guiana)
- Ennomomima trilineata peruviana (Rothschild, 1910) (Peru)
