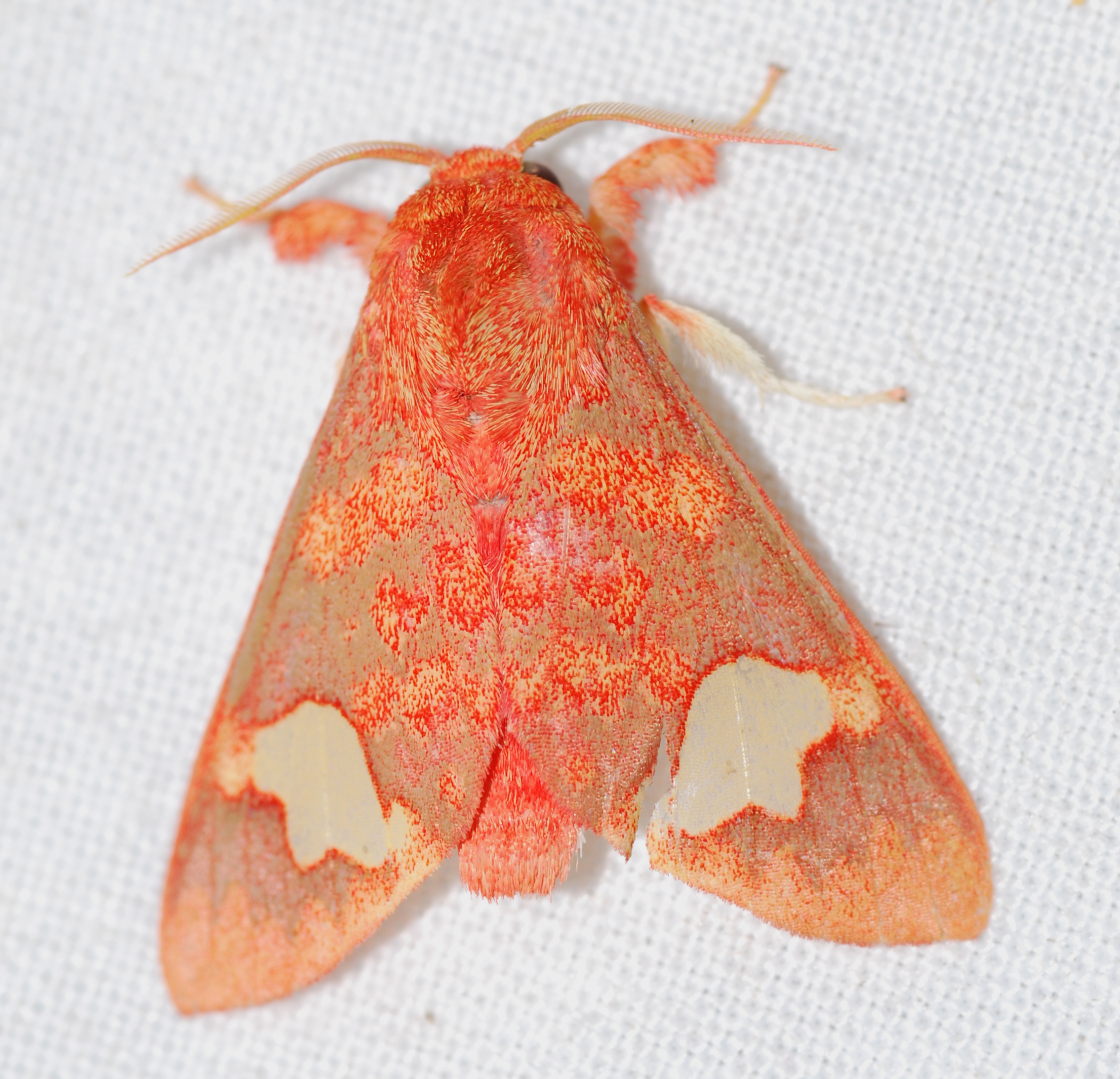

Scientific classification
- Kingdom: Animalia
- Phylum: Arthropoda
- Class: Insecta
- Order: Lepidoptera
- Superfamily: Noctuoidea
- Family: Erebidae
- Subfamily: Arctiinae
- Genus: Zatrephes
- Species: Z. crocos

Binomial name
- Zatrephes crocos (Cramer, 1777)

Synonyms
- Phalaena crocos Cramer, [1777]; Zatrephes istria H. Druce, 1899

= Zatrephes crocos =

Species of moth

Zatrephes crocos is a species of moth in the family Erebidae. It was described by Pieter Cramer in 1777. It is found in French Guiana, Suriname and Venezuela.
