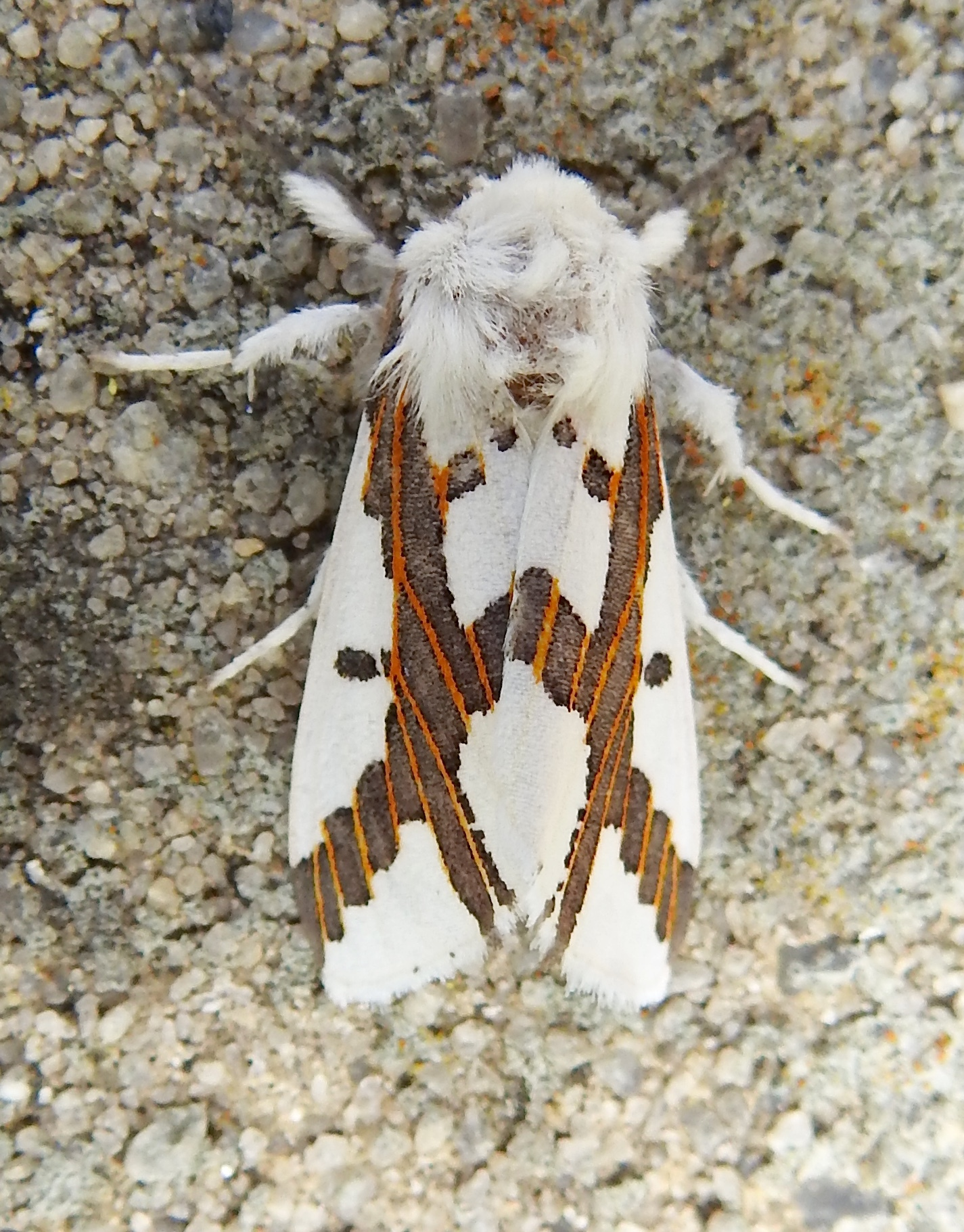

Scientific classification
- Kingdom: Animalia
- Phylum: Arthropoda
- Clade: Pancrustacea
- Class: Insecta
- Order: Lepidoptera
- Superfamily: Noctuoidea
- Family: Erebidae
- Subfamily: Arctiinae
- Genus: Euerythra
- Species: E. phasma

Binomial name
- Euerythra phasma Harvey, 1876

= Euerythra phasma =

Species of moth

Euerythra phasma, the red-tailed specter, is a moth of the family Erebidae. It was described by Leon F. Harvey in 1876. It is found in the south-central United States, including Alabama, Arkansas, Florida, Georgia, Kentucky, Mississippi, Missouri, Oklahoma, Kansas, Tennessee and Texas.
