= Zatrephes dithyris =

Scientific classification
- Kingdom: Animalia
- Phylum: Arthropoda
- Class: Insecta
- Order: Lepidoptera
- Superfamily: Noctuoidea
- Family: Erebidae
- Subfamily: Arctiinae
- Genus: Zatrephes
- Species: Z. dithyris

Binomial name
- Zatrephes dithyris Hampson, 1905

Species of moth

Zatrephes dithyris is a moth in the family Erebidae. It was described by George Hampson in 1905. It is found in French Guiana and Ecuador.
