= Chlorhoda tricolor =

Scientific classification
- Kingdom: Animalia
- Phylum: Arthropoda
- Class: Insecta
- Order: Lepidoptera
- Superfamily: Noctuoidea
- Family: Erebidae
- Subfamily: Arctiinae
- Genus: Chlorhoda
- Species: C. tricolor

Binomial name
- Chlorhoda tricolor Toulgoët, 1982

Species of moth

Chlorhoda tricolor is a moth of the subfamily Arctiinae first described by Hervé de Toulgoët in 1982. It is mainly found in Peru.
