= Palaeomolis metacauta =

Scientific classification
- Domain: Eukaryota
- Kingdom: Animalia
- Phylum: Arthropoda
- Class: Insecta
- Order: Lepidoptera
- Superfamily: Noctuoidea
- Family: Erebidae
- Subfamily: Arctiinae
- Genus: Palaeomolis
- Species: P. metacauta

Binomial name
- Palaeomolis metacauta Dognin, 1910

Species of moth

Palaeomolis metacauta is a moth of the subfamily Arctiinae. It was described by Paul Dognin in 1910. It is found in Colombia.
