= Euerythra virginea =

Scientific classification
- Domain: Eukaryota
- Kingdom: Animalia
- Phylum: Arthropoda
- Class: Insecta
- Order: Lepidoptera
- Superfamily: Noctuoidea
- Family: Erebidae
- Subfamily: Arctiinae
- Genus: Euerythra
- Species: E. virginea

Binomial name
- Euerythra virginea Dognin, 1924

Species of moth

Euerythra virginea is a moth of the family Erebidae. It was described by Paul Dognin in 1924. It is found in Argentina.
