= Zatrephes atrata =

Scientific classification
- Kingdom: Animalia
- Phylum: Arthropoda
- Class: Insecta
- Order: Lepidoptera
- Superfamily: Noctuoidea
- Family: Erebidae
- Subfamily: Arctiinae
- Genus: Zatrephes
- Species: Z. atrata

Binomial name
- Zatrephes atrata Rothschild, 1910

Species of moth

Zatrephes atrata is a moth of the family Erebidae. It was described by Walter Rothschild in 1910. It is found in Guyana.
