= Zatrephes nitida =

Scientific classification
- Kingdom: Animalia
- Phylum: Arthropoda
- Class: Insecta
- Order: Lepidoptera
- Superfamily: Noctuoidea
- Family: Erebidae
- Subfamily: Arctiinae
- Genus: Zatrephes
- Species: Z. nitida

Binomial name
- Zatrephes nitida (Cramer, 1780)

Synonyms
- Phalaena nitida Cramer, [1780]

Species of moth

Zatrephes nitida is a moth in the family Erebidae. It was detailed by Pieter Cramer in 1780. It is found in French Guiana and Suriname.
