= Zatrephes olivenca =

Scientific classification
- Kingdom: Animalia
- Phylum: Arthropoda
- Class: Insecta
- Order: Lepidoptera
- Superfamily: Noctuoidea
- Family: Erebidae
- Subfamily: Arctiinae
- Genus: Zatrephes
- Species: Z. olivenca

Binomial name
- Zatrephes olivenca Dognin, 1923

Species of moth

Zatrephes olivenca is a moth in the family Erebidae. It was described by Paul Dognin in 1923. It is found in Brazil.
