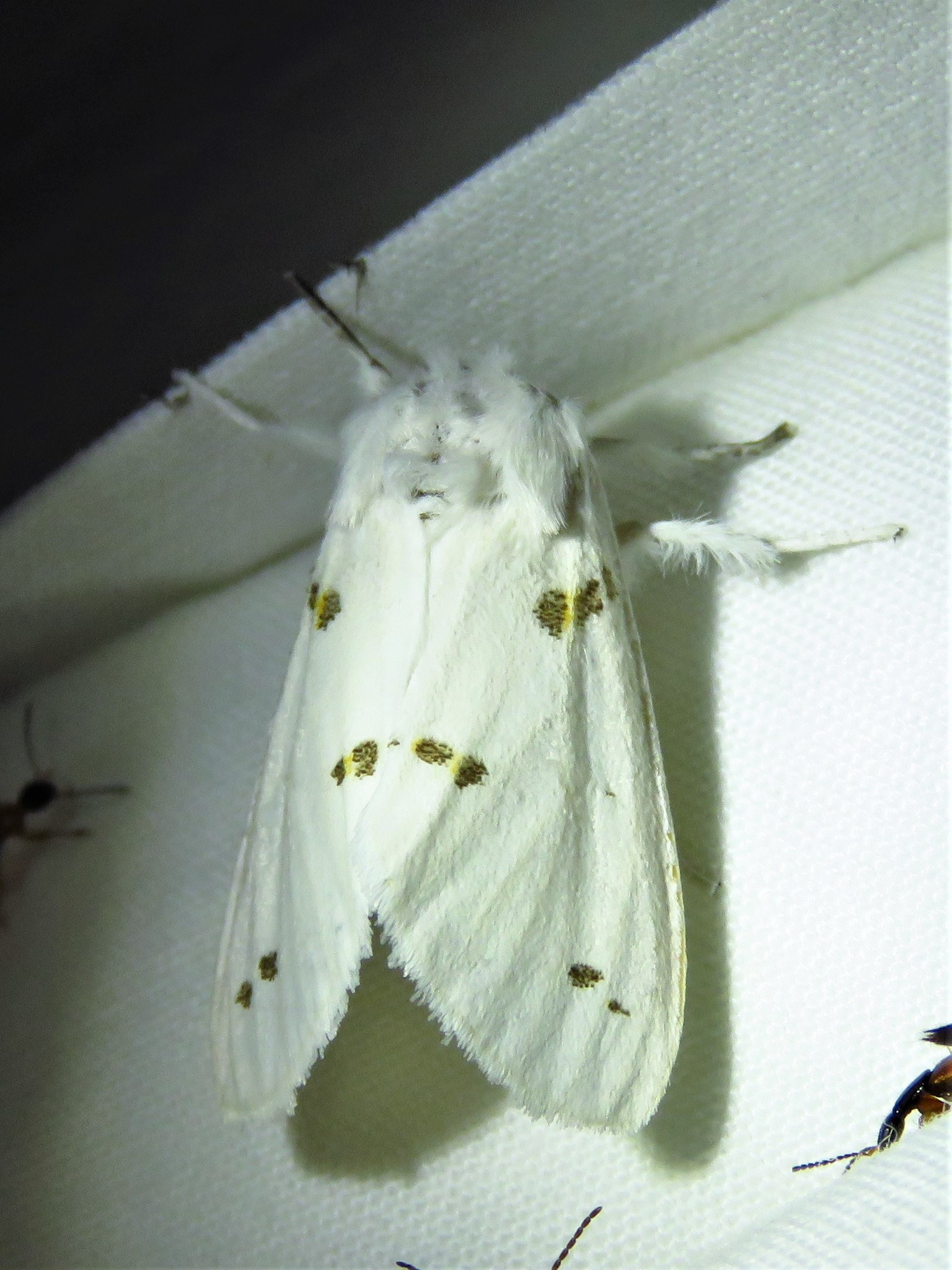

Scientific classification
- Domain: Eukaryota
- Kingdom: Animalia
- Phylum: Arthropoda
- Class: Insecta
- Order: Lepidoptera
- Superfamily: Noctuoidea
- Family: Erebidae
- Subfamily: Arctiinae
- Genus: Euerythra
- Species: E. trimaculata

Binomial name
- Euerythra trimaculata Smith, 1888

= Euerythra trimaculata =

Species of moth

Euerythra trimaculata, the three-spotted specter, is a moth of the family Erebidae. It was described by Smith in 1888. It is found in the United States in central and southern Texas and the Florida Panhandle.

The wingspan is about 28 mm.
