= Zatrephes cardytera =

Scientific classification
- Kingdom: Animalia
- Phylum: Arthropoda
- Class: Insecta
- Order: Lepidoptera
- Superfamily: Noctuoidea
- Family: Erebidae
- Subfamily: Arctiinae
- Genus: Zatrephes
- Species: Z. cardytera

Binomial name
- Zatrephes cardytera Dyar, 1910

Synonyms
- Zatrephes ignota Schaus, 1921

Species of moth

Zatrephes cardytera is a moth of the family Erebidae. It was described by Harrison Gray Dyar Jr. in 1910. It is found in French Guiana, Guyana and Venezuela.
