= Zatrephes magnifenestra =

Scientific classification
- Kingdom: Animalia
- Phylum: Arthropoda
- Class: Insecta
- Order: Lepidoptera
- Superfamily: Noctuoidea
- Family: Erebidae
- Subfamily: Arctiinae
- Genus: Zatrephes
- Species: Z. magnifenestra

Binomial name
- Zatrephes magnifenestra Bryk, 1953

Species of moth

Zatrephes magnifenestra is a moth in the family Erebidae. It was described by Felix Bryk in 1953. It is found in Brazil.
