= Zatrephes subflavescens =

Scientific classification
- Kingdom: Animalia
- Phylum: Arthropoda
- Class: Insecta
- Order: Lepidoptera
- Superfamily: Noctuoidea
- Family: Erebidae
- Subfamily: Arctiinae
- Genus: Zatrephes
- Species: Z. subflavescens

Binomial name
- Zatrephes subflavescens Rothschild, 1909

Species of moth

Zatrephes subflavescens is a moth in the family Erebidae. It was described by Walter Rothschild in 1909. It is found in French Guiana, Brazil and Suriname.
