= Zatrephes mossi =

Scientific classification
- Kingdom: Animalia
- Phylum: Arthropoda
- Class: Insecta
- Order: Lepidoptera
- Superfamily: Noctuoidea
- Family: Erebidae
- Subfamily: Arctiinae
- Genus: Zatrephes
- Species: Z. mossi

Binomial name
- Zatrephes mossi Rothschild, 1933

Species of moth

Zatrephes mossi is a moth in the family Erebidae. It was described by Walter Rothschild in 1933. It is found in Brazil.
