= Epimolis haemastica =

Scientific classification
- Domain: Eukaryota
- Kingdom: Animalia
- Phylum: Arthropoda
- Class: Insecta
- Order: Lepidoptera
- Superfamily: Noctuoidea
- Family: Erebidae
- Subfamily: Arctiinae
- Genus: Epimolis
- Species: E. haemastica

Binomial name
- Epimolis haemastica (Dognin, 1906)

Synonyms
- Neonerita haemastica Dognin, 1906; Neonerita haematosticta parvimacula Rothschild, 1910

Species of moth

Epimolis haemastica is a moth of the family Erebidae. It was described by Paul Dognin in 1906. It is found in Peru and Colombia.

== Subspecies ==
- Epimolis haemastica haemastica (Peru)
- Epimolis haemastica parvimacula (Rothschild, 1910) (Colombia)
