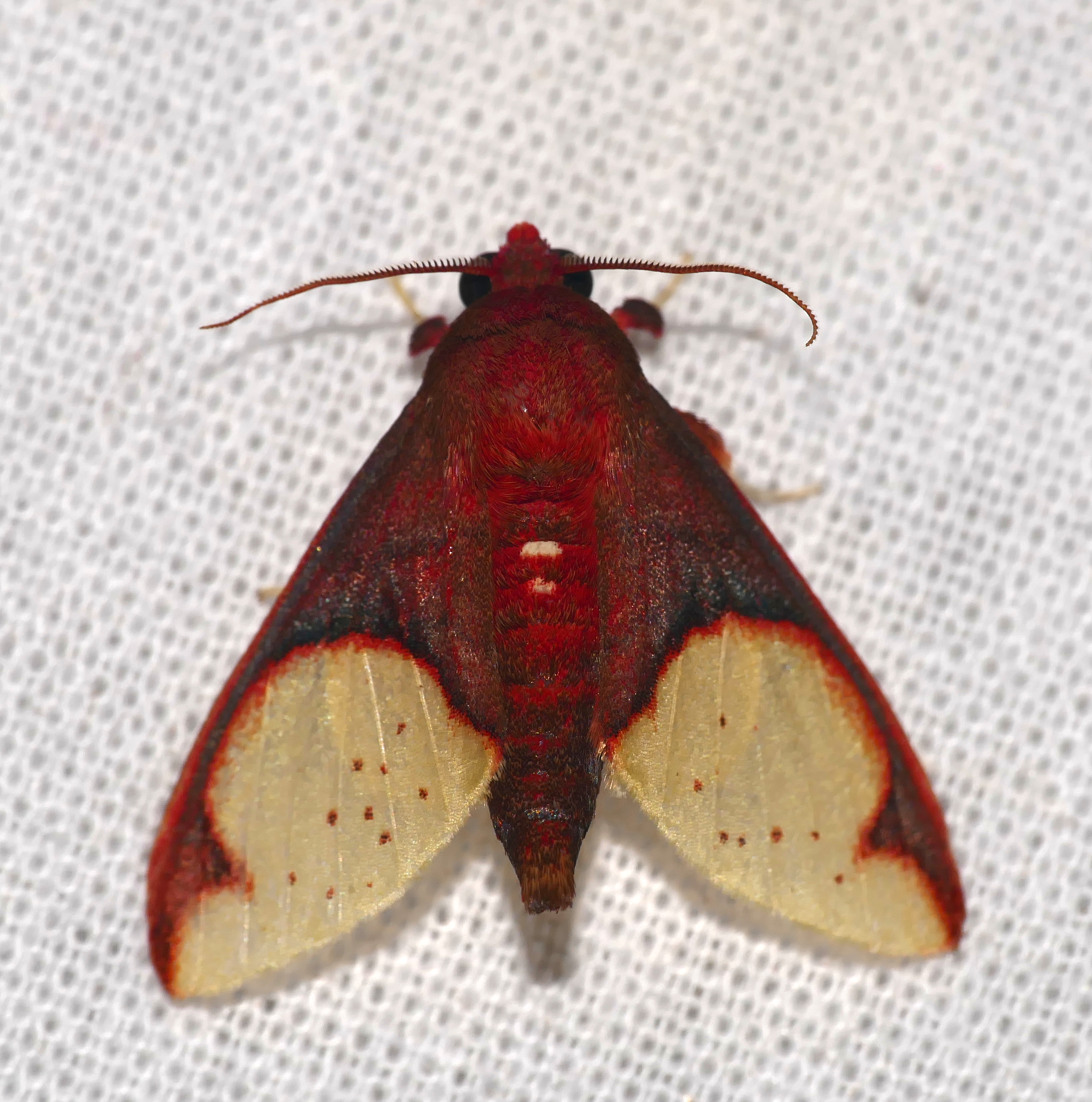

Scientific classification
- Kingdom: Animalia
- Phylum: Arthropoda
- Class: Insecta
- Order: Lepidoptera
- Superfamily: Noctuoidea
- Family: Erebidae
- Subfamily: Arctiinae
- Genus: Epimolis
- Species: E. incarnata

Binomial name
- Epimolis incarnata (Hampson, 1901)

Synonyms
- Aphyle incarnata Hampson, 1901; Pseudepimolis incarnata (Hampson, 1901)

= Epimolis incarnata =

Species of moth

Epimolis incarnata is a moth of the family Erebidae. It was described by George Hampson in 1901. It is found in French Guiana, Brazil, Ecuador and Peru.
