= Chlorhoda amabilis =

Scientific classification
- Kingdom: Animalia
- Phylum: Arthropoda
- Class: Insecta
- Order: Lepidoptera
- Superfamily: Noctuoidea
- Family: Erebidae
- Subfamily: Arctiinae
- Genus: Chlorhoda
- Species: C. amabilis

Binomial name
- Chlorhoda amabilis Schaus, 1915

Species of moth

Chlorhoda amabilis is a moth of the subfamily Arctiinae first described by William Schaus in 1915. It is found in Brazil.
