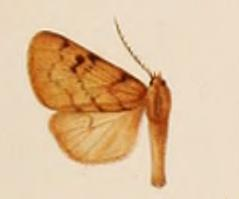
- Palaeomolis garleppi

Scientific classification
- Kingdom: Animalia
- Phylum: Arthropoda
- Class: Insecta
- Order: Lepidoptera
- Superfamily: Noctuoidea
- Family: Erebidae
- Subfamily: Arctiinae
- Subtribe: Arctiina
- Genus: Palaeomolis; Hampson, 1909

= Palaeomolis =

Genus of moths

Palaeomolis is a genus of moths in the subfamily Arctiinae. The genus was erected by George Hampson in 1909.

== Species ==
- Palaeomolis garleppi Rothschild, 1910
- Palaeomolis hampsoni Rothschild, 1910
- Palaeomolis lemairei Toulgoët, 1984
- Palaeomolis metacauta Dognin, 1910
- Palaeomolis metarhoda (Dognin, 1910)
- Palaeomolis palmeri (Rothschild, 1910)
- Palaeomolis purpurascens Hampson, 1909
- Palaeomolis rothschildi (Dognin, 1911)
- Palaeomolis rubescens Toulgoët, 1983
