= Chlorhoda pallens =

Scientific classification
- Kingdom: Animalia
- Phylum: Arthropoda
- Class: Insecta
- Order: Lepidoptera
- Superfamily: Noctuoidea
- Family: Erebidae
- Subfamily: Arctiinae
- Genus: Chlorhoda
- Species: C. pallens

Binomial name
- Chlorhoda pallens Toulgoët & Goodger, 1985

Species of moth

Chlorhoda pallens is a moth of the subfamily Arctiinae first described by Hervé de Toulgoët and David T. Goodger in 1985.
