= Epimolis syrissa =

Scientific classification
- Domain: Eukaryota
- Kingdom: Animalia
- Phylum: Arthropoda
- Class: Insecta
- Order: Lepidoptera
- Superfamily: Noctuoidea
- Family: Erebidae
- Subfamily: Arctiinae
- Genus: Epimolis
- Species: E. syrissa

Binomial name
- Epimolis syrissa (H. Druce, 1906)

Synonyms
- Idalus syrissa H. Druce, 1906; Antaxia syrissa; Pseudepimolis syrissa (H. Druce, 1906)

Species of moth

Epimolis syrissa is a moth of the family Erebidae. It was described by Herbert Druce in 1906. It is found in Peru.
