= Palaeomolis rothschildi =

Scientific classification
- Domain: Eukaryota
- Kingdom: Animalia
- Phylum: Arthropoda
- Class: Insecta
- Order: Lepidoptera
- Superfamily: Noctuoidea
- Family: Erebidae
- Subfamily: Arctiinae
- Genus: Palaeomolis
- Species: P. rothschildi

Binomial name
- Palaeomolis rothschildi (Dognin, 1911)

Synonyms
- Hypomolis rothschildi Dognin, 1911

Species of moth

Palaeomolis rothschildi is a moth of the subfamily Arctiinae. It was described by Paul Dognin in 1911. It is found in Colombia.
