= Zatrephes toulgoetana =

Scientific classification
- Kingdom: Animalia
- Phylum: Arthropoda
- Class: Insecta
- Order: Lepidoptera
- Superfamily: Noctuoidea
- Family: Erebidae
- Subfamily: Arctiinae
- Genus: Zatrephes
- Species: Z. toulgoetana

Binomial name
- Zatrephes toulgoetana (Laguerre, 2005)

Synonyms
- Ennomomima toulgoetana Laguerre, 2005

Species of moth

Zatrephes toulgoetana is a moth of the family Erebidae. It was described by Michel Laguerre in 2005. It is found in French Guiana.
