= Zatrephes mirabilis =

Scientific classification
- Kingdom: Animalia
- Phylum: Arthropoda
- Class: Insecta
- Order: Lepidoptera
- Superfamily: Noctuoidea
- Family: Erebidae
- Subfamily: Arctiinae
- Genus: Zatrephes
- Species: Z. mirabilis

Binomial name
- Zatrephes mirabilis (Toulgoët, [1990])

Synonyms
- Lalanneia mirabilis Toulgoët, [1990]

Species of moth

Zatrephes mirabilis is a Neotropical species of moths in the family Erebidae. It is found in French Guiana.

The species was formerly considered the sole species in the genus Lalanneia, which is now considered synonymous to Zatrephes.
