= Zatrephes amoena =

Scientific classification
- Kingdom: Animalia
- Phylum: Arthropoda
- Class: Insecta
- Order: Lepidoptera
- Superfamily: Noctuoidea
- Family: Erebidae
- Subfamily: Arctiinae
- Genus: Zatrephes
- Species: Z. amoena

Binomial name
- Zatrephes amoena Dognin, 1924

Species of moth

Zatrephes amoena is a moth in the family Erebidae. It was described by Paul Dognin in 1924. It is found in French Guiana and Brazil.
