= Epimolis zatrephica =

Scientific classification
- Kingdom: Animalia
- Phylum: Arthropoda
- Class: Insecta
- Order: Lepidoptera
- Superfamily: Noctuoidea
- Family: Erebidae
- Subfamily: Arctiinae
- Genus: Epimolis
- Species: E. zatrephica

Binomial name
- Epimolis zatrephica Dyar, 1913

Species of moth

Epimolis zatrephica is a moth of the family Erebidae. It was described by Harrison Gray Dyar Jr. in 1913. It is found in Mexico.
