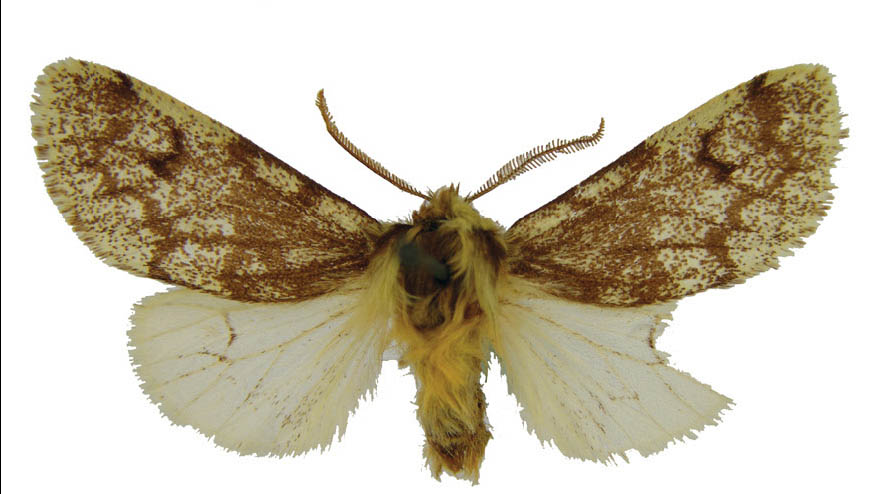
- Chlorocrisia irrorata

Scientific classification
- Kingdom: Animalia
- Phylum: Arthropoda
- Class: Insecta
- Order: Lepidoptera
- Superfamily: Noctuoidea
- Family: Erebidae
- Subfamily: Arctiinae
- Subtribe: Arctiina
- Genus: Chlorocrisia; Hampson, 1911
- Species: C. irrorata

Binomial name
- Chlorocrisia irrorata (Rothschild, 1910)

Synonyms
- Diacrisia irrorata Rothschild, 1910

= Chlorocrisia =

Genus of moths

Chlorocrisia is a monotypic moth genus in the subfamily Arctiinae erected by George Hampson in 1911. Its single species, Chlorocrisia irrorata, was first described by Walter Rothschild in 1910. It is found in Peru.
