= Epimolis =

Scientific classification
- Kingdom: Animalia
- Phylum: Arthropoda
- Class: Insecta
- Order: Lepidoptera
- Superfamily: Noctuoidea
- Family: Erebidae
- Subfamily: Arctiinae
- Subtribe: Phaegopterina
- Genus: Epimolis; Dyar, 1913

Genus of moths

Epimolis is a genus of moths in the family Erebidae. The genus was erected by Harrison Gray Dyar Jr. in 1913.

== Species ==
- Epimolis affinis (Rothschild, 1909)
- Epimolis arcifera (Dognin, 1912)
- Epimolis conifera (Dognin, 1912)
- Epimolis creon Druce, 1897
- Epimolis flavonotata (Rothschild, 1909)
- Epimolis haemastica (Dognin, 1906)
- Epimolis incarnata (Hampson, 1901)
- Epimolis marpessa (Druce, 1906)
- Epimolis pseudopraemolis (Rothschild, 1909)
- Epimolis ridenda (Dognin, 1911)
- Epimolis syrissa (Druce, 1906)
- Epimolis zatrephica Dyar, 1913

== Former species ==
- Epimolis incisa (Rothschild, 1909)
