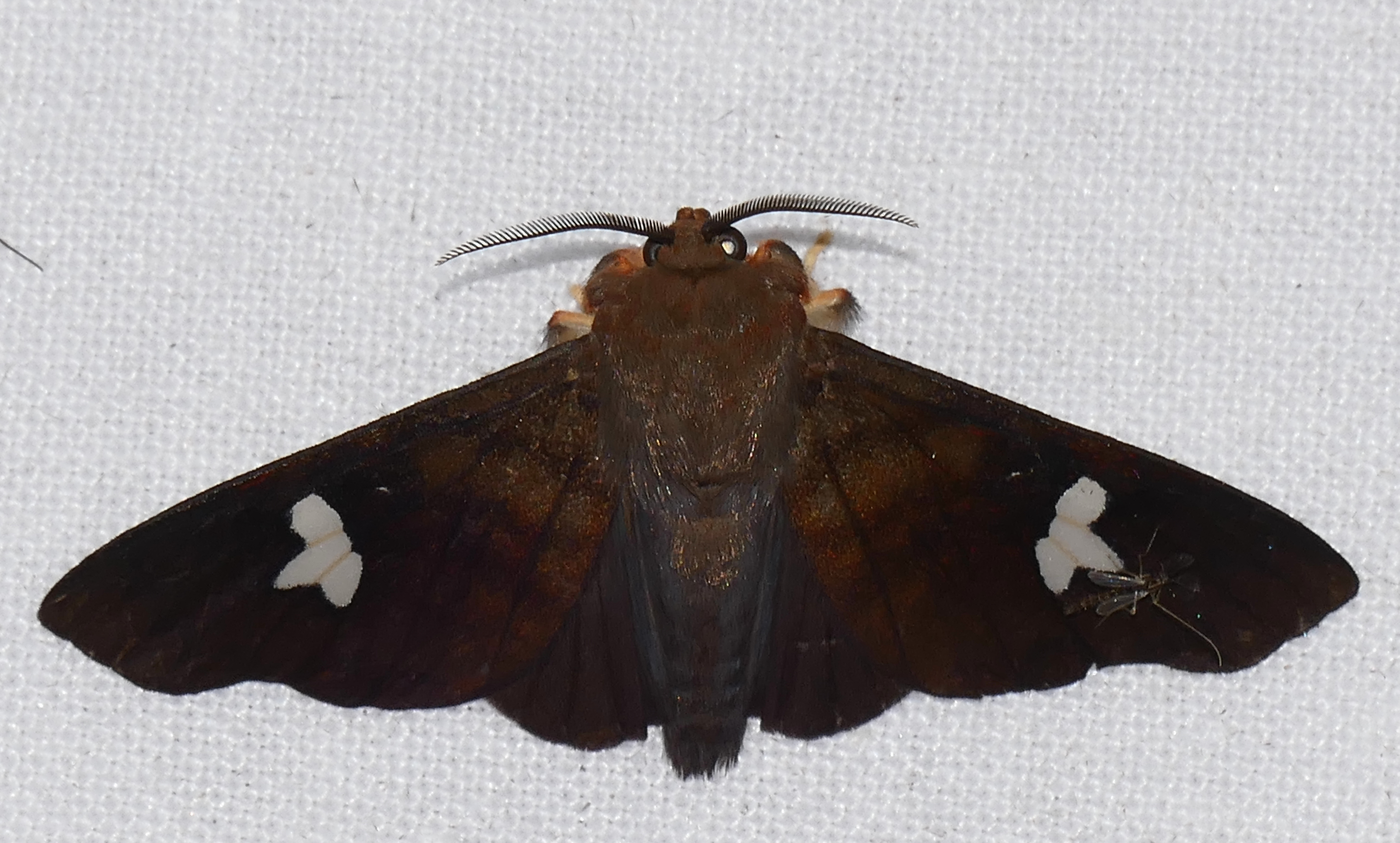

Scientific classification
- Kingdom: Animalia
- Phylum: Arthropoda
- Class: Insecta
- Order: Lepidoptera
- Superfamily: Noctuoidea
- Family: Erebidae
- Subfamily: Arctiinae
- Genus: Zatrephes
- Species: Z. miniata

Binomial name
- Zatrephes miniata Rothschild, 1909

Synonyms
- Automolis pseudidalus Rothschild, 1910; Pseudolus pseudidalus; Ennomomima miniata (Rothschild, 1909)

= Zatrephes miniata =

Species of moth

Zatrephes miniata is a moth of the family Erebidae. It was described by Walter Rothschild in 1909. It is found in Brazil (Amazonas) and French Guiana.
