= Kodiosoma =

Scientific classification
- Kingdom: Animalia
- Phylum: Arthropoda
- Clade: Pancrustacea
- Class: Insecta
- Order: Lepidoptera
- Superfamily: Noctuoidea
- Family: Erebidae
- Subfamily: Arctiinae
- Genus: Kodiosoma; Stretch, 1872
- Species: K. fulva

Binomial name
- Kodiosoma fulva Stretch, 1872

Synonyms
- Kodiosoma fulvum Stretch, 1872; Codiosoma [sic] fulva Stretch, 1872; Kodiosoma nigra Stretch, 1872; Kodiosoma eavesii Stretch, 1872; Kodiosoma tricolor Stretch, 1872; Kodiosoma otero Barnes, 1907

Genus of moths

Kodiosoma is a monotypic genus of moths in the family Erebidae. Its only species, Kodiosoma fulva, is found in Arizona, Nevada and California. Both the genus and species were described by Richard Harper Stretch in 1872.

The coloured area on the hindwings varies from gray to yellow or red. Adults have been recorded on wing from March to May.

== Subspecies or variants ==
Originally, multiple species were described, including Kodiosoma nigra Stretch, 1872 (from California), or Kodiosoma tricolor Stretch, 1872 and Kodiosoma eavesii Stretch, 1872 (both from Nevada). These were followed by Kodiosoma otero Barnes, 1907 (from Arizona). However, in recent schemes these are treated as synonyms.
