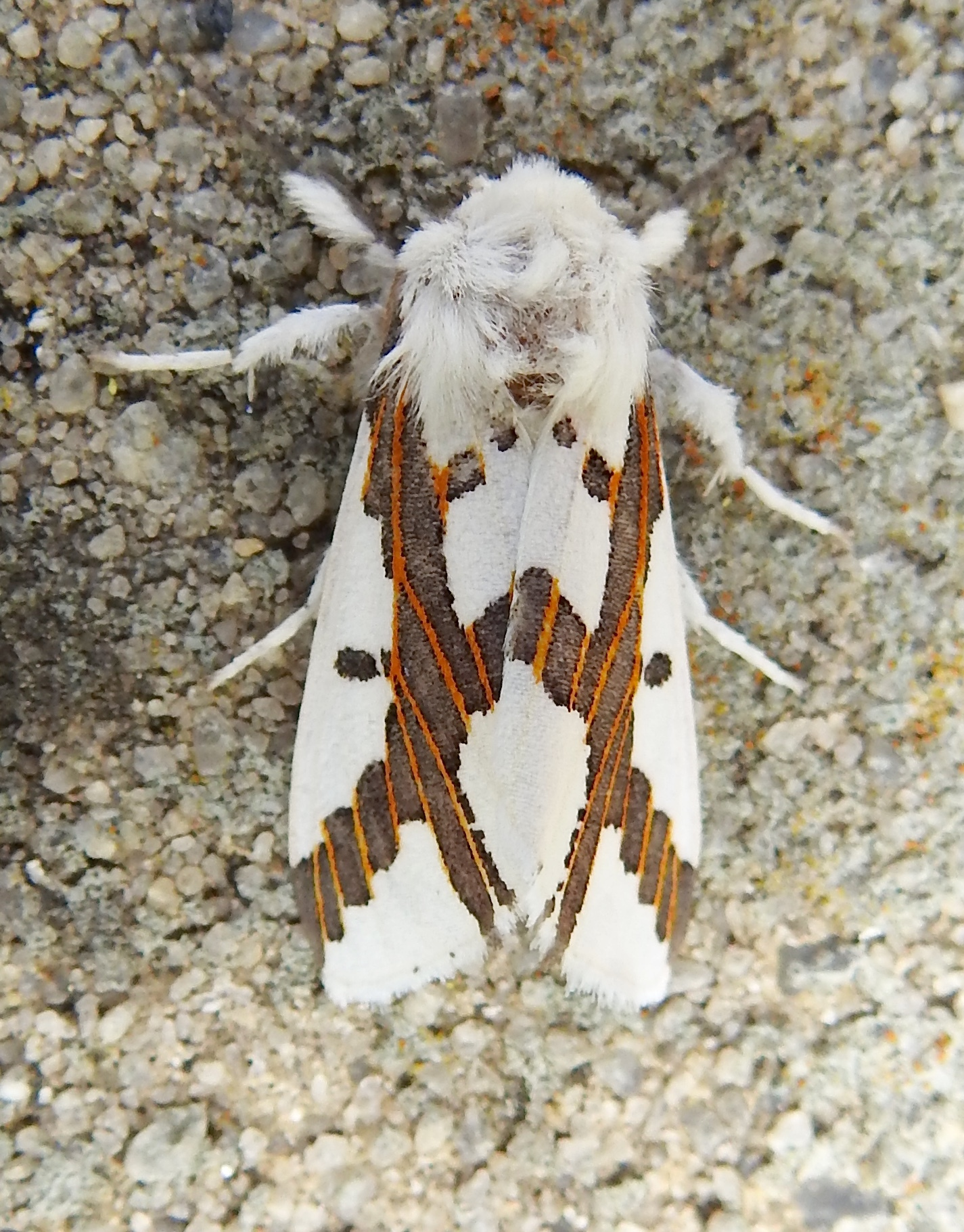
- Euerythra phasma

Scientific classification
- Domain: Eukaryota
- Kingdom: Animalia
- Phylum: Arthropoda
- Class: Insecta
- Order: Lepidoptera
- Superfamily: Noctuoidea
- Family: Erebidae
- Subfamily: Arctiinae
- Subtribe: Phaegopterina
- Genus: Euerythra; Harvey, 1876

Type species
- Euerythra phasma Harvey, 1876

= Euerythra =

Genus of moths

Euerythra is a genus of moths in the family Erebidae. The genus was erected by Leon F. Harvey in 1876.

== Species ==
- Euerythra phasma Harvey, 1876 – red-tailed specter
- Euerythra trimaculata Smith, 1888 – three-spotted specter
- Euerythra virginea Dognin, 1924
