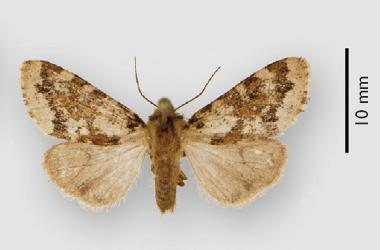
- Leichosila wagneri

Scientific classification
- Kingdom: Animalia
- Phylum: Arthropoda
- Clade: Pancrustacea
- Class: Insecta
- Order: Lepidoptera
- Superfamily: Noctuoidea
- Family: Erebidae
- Subfamily: Arctiinae
- Tribe: Arctiini
- Genus: Leichosila; Schmidt, 2009

= Leichosila =

Genus of moths

Leichosila is a genus of moths in the subfamily Arctiinae. The genus was erected by Christian Schmidt in 2009.

== Species ==
- Leichosila talamanca Schmidt, 2009
- Leichosila wagneri Schmidt, 2009
