= Hiera =

Scientific classification
- Kingdom: Animalia
- Phylum: Arthropoda
- Class: Insecta
- Order: Lepidoptera
- Superfamily: Noctuoidea
- Family: Erebidae
- Subfamily: Arctiinae
- Subtribe: Arctiina
- Genus: Hiera; H. Druce in Godman & Salvin, 1885
- Species: H. gyge

Binomial name
- Hiera gyge H. Druce, 1885

Genus of moths

Hiera is a monotypic moth genus in the subfamily Arctiinae. It contains the single species Hiera gyge, which is found in Panama. Both the genus and species were first described by Herbert Druce in 1885.

== Etymology ==
Hiera is Greek for a temple or sacred place.
