= Amurrhyparia =

Scientific classification
- Kingdom: Animalia
- Phylum: Arthropoda
- Clade: Pancrustacea
- Class: Insecta
- Order: Lepidoptera
- Superfamily: Noctuoidea
- Family: Erebidae
- Subfamily: Arctiinae
- Tribe: Arctiini
- Subtribe: Micrarctiina
- Genus: Amurrhyparia; Dubatolov, 1985
- Species: A. leopardina

Binomial name
- Amurrhyparia leopardina (Strand, 1919)

Synonyms
- Diacrisia leopardinula Strand, 1919; Chelonia leopardina Ménétriés, 1859; Diacrisia leopardina mandschurica Bang-Haas, 1936; Amurrhyparia sinensis Bang-Haas, 1936

Genus of moths

Amurrhyparia is a monotypic tiger moth genus in the family Erebidae erected by Vladimir Viktorovitch Dubatolov in 1985. Its only species, Amurrhyparia leopardina, was first described by Embrik Strand in 1919. It is found in Russia (southeastern Transbaikalia, Amur, and Primorye) and China (Heilongjiang, Shanxi, Gansu, Qinghai, Tibet, and Sichuan).
