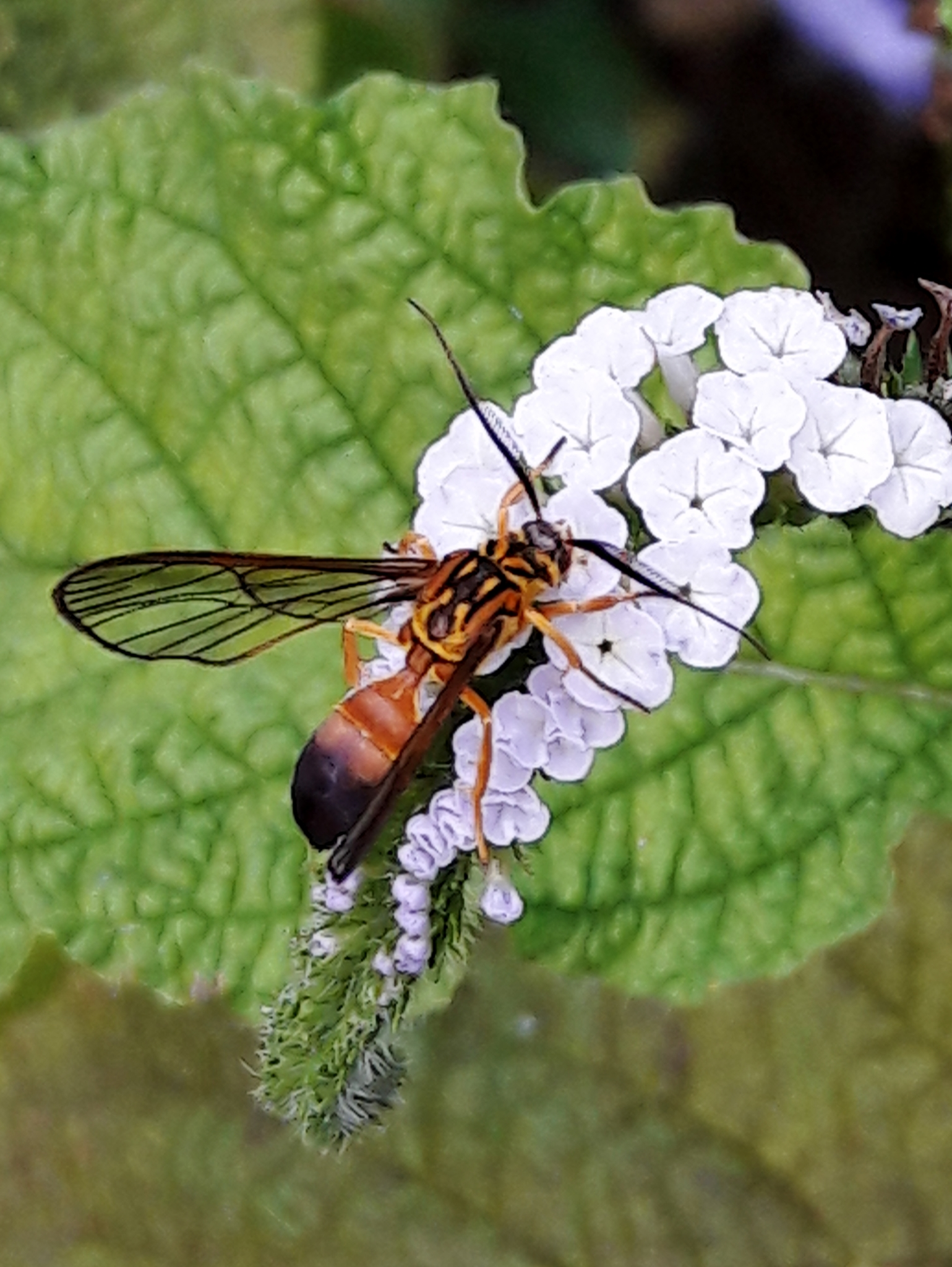
- Sphecosoma abdominalis, Brazil

Scientific classification
- Kingdom: Animalia
- Phylum: Arthropoda
- Class: Insecta
- Order: Lepidoptera
- Superfamily: Noctuoidea
- Family: Erebidae
- Subfamily: Arctiinae
- Tribe: Arctiini
- Genus: Sphecosoma; Butler, 1876

= Sphecosoma =

Genus of moths

Sphecosoma is a genus of wasp moths, or wasp-mimicking moths, in the subfamily Arctiinae. They are found mainly in Mexico, Central America, and South America.

This genus was erected by Arthur Gardiner Butler in 1876.

== Species ==
The genus includes the following species:

- Sphecosoma abdominalis Schaus, 1905
- Sphecosoma abnormis Hampson, 1898
- Sphecosoma albipalpe Draudt, 1915
- Sphecosoma alica Jones, D., 1914
- Sphecosoma alienum (Walker, 1854)
- Sphecosoma aurantiipes Rothschild, 1911
- Sphecosoma besasa Schaus, 1924
- Sphecosoma cognata Walker, 1856
- Sphecosoma curta Rothschild, 1931
- Sphecosoma deceptrix Hampson, 1898
- Sphecosoma ecuadora Druce, 1883
- Sphecosoma faurei Cerda, 2008
- Sphecosoma flaveolum Rothschild, 1931
- Sphecosoma gracilis Jörgensen, 1932
- Sphecosoma linda Jones, D., 1914
- Sphecosoma mathani Rothschild, 1911
- Sphecosoma matta Jones, D., 1914
- Sphecosoma meerkatzi Strand, 1915
- Sphecosoma melanota Hampson, 1898
- Sphecosoma melapera Dognin, 1909
- Sphecosoma melissa Schaus, 1896
- Sphecosoma melissina Kaye
- Sphecosoma meridionale Schrottky, 1910
- Sphecosoma metamela Hampson, 1905
- Sphecosoma nigriceps Hampson, 1903
- Sphecosoma patawaensis Cerda, 2008
- Sphecosoma pattiannae Simmons
- Sphecosoma perconstrictum Zerny, 1912
- Sphecosoma plumbicincta Draudt, 1915
- Sphecosoma roseipuncta Schaus, 1920
- Sphecosoma rufipes Rothschild, 1911
- Sphecosoma semelina Jones, D., 1914
- Sphecosoma simile Schaus, 1894
- Sphecosoma sparta Druce, 1900
- Sphecosoma spec Zerny, 1912
- Sphecosoma surrentum Druce, 1883
- Sphecosoma tarsalis (Walker, 1854)
- Sphecosoma tenebrosum (Walker, 1854)
- Sphecosoma testacea Walker, 1854
- Sphecosoma trinitatis Rothschild, 1911
- Sphecosoma vicinum Schrottky, 1910
