= Eucyrta =

Scientific classification
- Domain: Eukaryota
- Kingdom: Animalia
- Phylum: Arthropoda
- Class: Insecta
- Order: Lepidoptera
- Superfamily: Noctuoidea
- Family: Erebidae
- Subfamily: Arctiinae
- Tribe: Arctiini
- Subtribe: Phaegopterina
- Genus: Eucyrta; Felder, 1874

Genus of moths

Eucyrta is a genus of moths in the family Erebidae erected by Felder in 1874.

== Species ==
- Eucyrta albicollis

== Former species ==
- Eucyrta venusta
