= Chrostosoma patricia =

Scientific classification
- Domain: Eukaryota
- Kingdom: Animalia
- Phylum: Arthropoda
- Class: Insecta
- Order: Lepidoptera
- Superfamily: Noctuoidea
- Family: Erebidae
- Subfamily: Arctiinae
- Tribe: Arctiini
- Genus: Chrostosoma
- Species: C. patricia

Binomial name
- Chrostosoma patricia Schaus, 1912

Species of moth

Chrostosoma patricia is a moth of the subfamily Arctiinae. it was described by William Schaus in 1912. It is found in Costa Rica.
