= Sphecosoma cognata =

Scientific classification
- Kingdom: Animalia
- Phylum: Arthropoda
- Class: Insecta
- Order: Lepidoptera
- Superfamily: Noctuoidea
- Family: Erebidae
- Subfamily: Arctiinae
- Tribe: Arctiini
- Genus: Sphecosoma
- Species: S. cognata

Binomial name
- Sphecosoma cognata (Walker, 1856)

Synonyms
- Pseudosphex cognata Walker, 1856; Sphecosoma fasciolatum Butler, 1876

Species of moth

Sphecosoma cognata is a moth in the subfamily Arctiinae. It was described by Francis Walker in 1856. It is found in Mexico, Colombia and the Amazon region.
