= Aethria pyroproctis =

Scientific classification
- Kingdom: Animalia
- Phylum: Arthropoda
- Class: Insecta
- Order: Lepidoptera
- Superfamily: Noctuoidea
- Family: Erebidae
- Subfamily: Arctiinae
- Tribe: Arctiini
- Genus: Aethria
- Species: A. pyroproctis

Binomial name
- Aethria pyroproctis (Hampson, 1914)

Synonyms
- Mesolasia pyroproctis Hampson, 1914

Species of moth

Aethria pyroproctis is a moth of the subfamily Arctiinae. It was described by George Hampson in 1914. It is found in Peru.
