= Chrostosoma echemus =

Scientific classification
- Domain: Eukaryota
- Kingdom: Animalia
- Phylum: Arthropoda
- Class: Insecta
- Order: Lepidoptera
- Superfamily: Noctuoidea
- Family: Erebidae
- Subfamily: Arctiinae
- Tribe: Arctiini
- Genus: Chrostosoma
- Species: C. echemus

Binomial name
- Chrostosoma echemus (Stoll, 1782)

Synonyms
- Sphinx echemus Stoll, [1781]; Glaucopis dolens Walker, 1854; Laemocharis stulta Herrich-Schäffer, [1854]

Species of moth

Chrostosoma echemus is a moth of the subfamily Arctiinae. It was described by Caspar Stoll in 1782. It is found in Suriname and the Amazon region.
