= Sphecosoma melissina =

Scientific classification
- Domain: Eukaryota
- Kingdom: Animalia
- Phylum: Arthropoda
- Class: Insecta
- Order: Lepidoptera
- Superfamily: Noctuoidea
- Family: Erebidae
- Subfamily: Arctiinae
- Tribe: Arctiini
- Genus: Sphecosoma
- Species: S. melissina

Binomial name
- Sphecosoma melissina Kaye, 1912

Species of moth

Sphecosoma melissina is a moth in the subfamily Arctiinae. It was described by William James Kaye in 1912. It is found in southern Brazil.

The wingspan is about 23 mm. The forewings are yellowish hyaline (glass like) with the costa slightly and with the inner margin broadly orange at the base. The costa is black beyond the middle of the cell. The hindwings are yellowish hyaline.
