= Chrostosoma viridipunctata =

Scientific classification
- Domain: Eukaryota
- Kingdom: Animalia
- Phylum: Arthropoda
- Class: Insecta
- Order: Lepidoptera
- Superfamily: Noctuoidea
- Family: Erebidae
- Subfamily: Arctiinae
- Tribe: Arctiini
- Genus: Chrostosoma
- Species: C. viridipunctata

Binomial name
- Chrostosoma viridipunctata Rothschild, 1911

Synonyms
- Chrostosoma viridipunctatum

Species of moth

Chrostosoma viridipunctata is a moth of the subfamily Arctiinae. It was described by Walter Rothschild in 1911. It is found in Bolivia.
