= Migoplastis =

Scientific classification
- Domain: Eukaryota
- Kingdom: Animalia
- Phylum: Arthropoda
- Class: Insecta
- Order: Lepidoptera
- Superfamily: Noctuoidea
- Family: Erebidae
- Subfamily: Arctiinae
- Tribe: Arctiini
- Genus: Migoplastis; R. Felder, 1868

Synonyms
- Pachyphilona Butler, 1875; Dondera Moore, 1877

Genus of moths

Migoplastis is a genus of moths in the subfamily Arctiinae first described by Rudolf Felder in 1868. They are confined to India's Nilgiri Mountains and to Sri Lanka.

== Description ==
Palpi porrect (extending forward), extending considerably beyond the frons. Antennae bipectinate in both sexes. Mid and hind tibia possess minute spurs. Forewings with rounded apex and outer margin. Vein 3 from before angle of cell and vein 5 from above the angle of cell. Vein 6 from upper angle and veins 7 and 10 from a long areole formed by the anastomosis of veins 8 and 9. Hindwings with vein 2 from before angle of cell. Vein 5 from the angle.

== Species ==
It contains the following species:

- Migoplastis alba
- Migoplastis correcta
