= Demolis =

Scientific classification
- Domain: Eukaryota
- Kingdom: Animalia
- Phylum: Arthropoda
- Class: Insecta
- Order: Lepidoptera
- Superfamily: Noctuoidea
- Family: Erebidae
- Subfamily: Arctiinae
- Subtribe: Phaegopterina
- Genus: Demolis; Hampson, 1901

Genus of moths

Demolis is a genus of moths in the family Erebidae. The genus was erected by George Hampson in 1901.

== Species ==
- Demolis albicostata
- Demolis albitegula

== Former species ==
- Demolis eugenia
- Demolis flavithorax
- Demolis ridenda
