= Chrostosoma endochrysa =

Scientific classification
- Kingdom: Animalia
- Phylum: Arthropoda
- Class: Insecta
- Order: Lepidoptera
- Superfamily: Noctuoidea
- Family: Erebidae
- Subfamily: Arctiinae
- Genus: Chrostosoma
- Species: C. endochrysa

Binomial name
- Chrostosoma endochrysa (Dognin, 1911)

Synonyms
- Leucotmensis endochrysa Dognin, 1911

Species of moth

Chrostosoma endochrysa is a moth of the subfamily Arctiinae. it was described by Paul Dognin in 1911. It is found in French Guiana.
