= Chrostosoma halli =

Scientific classification
- Domain: Eukaryota
- Kingdom: Animalia
- Phylum: Arthropoda
- Class: Insecta
- Order: Lepidoptera
- Superfamily: Noctuoidea
- Family: Erebidae
- Subfamily: Arctiinae
- Tribe: Arctiini
- Genus: Chrostosoma
- Species: C. halli

Binomial name
- Chrostosoma halli Kaye, 1918

Species of moth

Chrostosoma halli is a moth of the subfamily Arctiinae. It was described by William James Kaye in 1918. It is found in Guatemala.

The wingspan is about 33 mm. The forewings are yellowish hyaline (glass like), with the costa narrowly black beyond the cell and with the apex black. The outer margin is very narrowly black. The hindwings are yellow hyaline, the outer margins narrowly black, becoming broader at the anal angle.
