= Chrostosoma dhamis =

Scientific classification
- Domain: Eukaryota
- Kingdom: Animalia
- Phylum: Arthropoda
- Class: Insecta
- Order: Lepidoptera
- Superfamily: Noctuoidea
- Family: Erebidae
- Subfamily: Arctiinae
- Tribe: Arctiini
- Genus: Chrostosoma
- Species: C. dhamis

Binomial name
- Chrostosoma dhamis Schaus, 1920

Species of moth

Chrostosoma dhamis is a moth of the subfamily Arctiinae. It was described by William Schaus in 1920. It is found in Brazil.
