= Sphecosoma melanota =

Scientific classification
- Kingdom: Animalia
- Phylum: Arthropoda
- Class: Insecta
- Order: Lepidoptera
- Superfamily: Noctuoidea
- Family: Erebidae
- Subfamily: Arctiinae
- Tribe: Arctiini
- Genus: Sphecosoma
- Species: S. melanota

Binomial name
- Sphecosoma melanota Hampson, 1898

Synonyms
- Sphecosoma melanotum Hampson, 1898

Species of moth

Sphecosoma melanota is a moth in the subfamily Arctiinae. It was described by George Hampson in 1898. It is found in Bolivia.
