= Chrostosoma schausi =

Scientific classification
- Domain: Eukaryota
- Kingdom: Animalia
- Phylum: Arthropoda
- Class: Insecta
- Order: Lepidoptera
- Superfamily: Noctuoidea
- Family: Erebidae
- Subfamily: Arctiinae
- Tribe: Arctiini
- Genus: Chrostosoma
- Species: C. schausi

Binomial name
- Chrostosoma schausi Rothschild, 1911

Species of moth

Chrostosoma schausi is a moth of the subfamily Arctiinae. it was described by Walter Rothschild in 1911. It is found in Costa Rica, Panama and Ecuador.
