= Aethria ornata =

Scientific classification
- Domain: Eukaryota
- Kingdom: Animalia
- Phylum: Arthropoda
- Class: Insecta
- Order: Lepidoptera
- Superfamily: Noctuoidea
- Family: Erebidae
- Subfamily: Arctiinae
- Tribe: Arctiini
- Genus: Aethria
- Species: A. ornata

Binomial name
- Aethria ornata (Ménétriés, 1857)

Synonyms
- Laemocharis ornata Ménétriés, 1857; Mesolasia ornata Hampson, 1898

Species of moth

Aethria ornata is a moth of the subfamily Arctiinae. It was described by Édouard Ménétries in 1857. It is found in Brazil.
