= Chrostosoma unxa =

Scientific classification
- Domain: Eukaryota
- Kingdom: Animalia
- Phylum: Arthropoda
- Class: Insecta
- Order: Lepidoptera
- Superfamily: Noctuoidea
- Family: Erebidae
- Subfamily: Arctiinae
- Tribe: Arctiini
- Genus: Chrostosoma
- Species: C. unxa

Binomial name
- Chrostosoma unxa (H. Druce, 1896)

Synonyms
- Ilipa unxa H. Druce, 1897

Species of moth

Chrostosoma unxa is a moth of the subfamily Arctiinae. It was described by Herbert Druce in 1896. It is found in Panama.
