= Sphecosoma sparta =

Scientific classification
- Domain: Eukaryota
- Kingdom: Animalia
- Phylum: Arthropoda
- Class: Insecta
- Order: Lepidoptera
- Superfamily: Noctuoidea
- Family: Erebidae
- Subfamily: Arctiinae
- Tribe: Arctiini
- Genus: Sphecosoma
- Species: S. sparta

Binomial name
- Sphecosoma sparta H. Druce, 1900

Species of moth

Sphecosoma sparta is a moth in the subfamily Arctiinae. It was described by Herbert Druce in 1900. It is found in Colombia.
