= Chrostosoma haematica =

Scientific classification
- Domain: Eukaryota
- Kingdom: Animalia
- Phylum: Arthropoda
- Class: Insecta
- Order: Lepidoptera
- Superfamily: Noctuoidea
- Family: Erebidae
- Subfamily: Arctiinae
- Tribe: Arctiini
- Genus: Chrostosoma
- Species: C. haematica

Binomial name
- Chrostosoma haematica (Perty, 1834)

Synonyms
- Glaucopis haematica Perty, 1834; Laemocharis zantes Herrich-Schäffer, [1854]; Laemocharis fenestrina Butler, 1876; Dycladia chalconitis Druce, 1883; Chrostosoma decisa Walker, 1864

Species of moth

Chrostosoma haematica is a moth of the subfamily Arctiinae. it was described by Maximilian Perty in 1834. It is found in Ecuador and Brazil.
