= Chrostosoma mediana =

Scientific classification
- Domain: Eukaryota
- Kingdom: Animalia
- Phylum: Arthropoda
- Class: Insecta
- Order: Lepidoptera
- Superfamily: Noctuoidea
- Family: Erebidae
- Subfamily: Arctiinae
- Tribe: Arctiini
- Genus: Chrostosoma
- Species: C. mediana

Binomial name
- Chrostosoma mediana Schaus, 1928

Species of moth

Chrostosoma mediana is a moth of the subfamily Arctiinae. It was described by William Schaus in 1928. It is found in Paraguay.
