= Aethria felderi =

Scientific classification
- Domain: Eukaryota
- Kingdom: Animalia
- Phylum: Arthropoda
- Class: Insecta
- Order: Lepidoptera
- Superfamily: Noctuoidea
- Family: Erebidae
- Subfamily: Arctiinae
- Tribe: Arctiini
- Genus: Aethria
- Species: A. felderi

Binomial name
- Aethria felderi Rothschild, 1911

Synonyms
- Mesolasia felderi; Homoeocera felderi

Species of moth

Aethria felderi is a moth of the subfamily Arctiinae. It was described by Rothschild in 1911. It is found in Suriname and Brazil.
