= Aethria analis =

Scientific classification
- Kingdom: Animalia
- Phylum: Arthropoda
- Class: Insecta
- Order: Lepidoptera
- Superfamily: Noctuoidea
- Family: Erebidae
- Subfamily: Arctiinae
- Tribe: Arctiini
- Genus: Aethria
- Species: A. analis

Binomial name
- Aethria analis Schaus, 1910

Species of moth

Aethria analis is a moth of the subfamily Arctiinae. It was described by William Schaus in 1910. It is found in Peru.
