= Chrostosoma tabascensis =

Scientific classification
- Domain: Eukaryota
- Kingdom: Animalia
- Phylum: Arthropoda
- Class: Insecta
- Order: Lepidoptera
- Superfamily: Noctuoidea
- Family: Erebidae
- Subfamily: Arctiinae
- Tribe: Arctiini
- Genus: Chrostosoma
- Species: C. tabascensis

Binomial name
- Chrostosoma tabascensis Dyar, 1916

Species of moth

Chrostosoma tabascensis is a moth of the subfamily Arctiinae. it was described by Harrison Gray Dyar Jr. in 1916. It is found in Guatemala and Mexico.
