= Sphecosoma gracilis =

Scientific classification
- Domain: Eukaryota
- Kingdom: Animalia
- Phylum: Arthropoda
- Class: Insecta
- Order: Lepidoptera
- Superfamily: Noctuoidea
- Family: Erebidae
- Subfamily: Arctiinae
- Tribe: Arctiini
- Genus: Sphecosoma
- Species: S. gracilis

Binomial name
- Sphecosoma gracilis Jörgensen, 1932

Species of moth

Sphecosoma gracilis is a moth in the subfamily Arctiinae. It was described by Peter Jörgensen in 1932. It is found in Paraguay.
