= Sphecosoma abnormis =

Scientific classification
- Kingdom: Animalia
- Phylum: Arthropoda
- Class: Insecta
- Order: Lepidoptera
- Superfamily: Noctuoidea
- Family: Erebidae
- Subfamily: Arctiinae
- Tribe: Arctiini
- Genus: Sphecosoma
- Species: S. abnormis

Binomial name
- Sphecosoma abnormis Hampson, 1898

Synonyms
- Abnormipterus abnormis (Hampson, 1898)

Species of moth

Sphecosoma abnormis is a moth in the Arctiinae subfamily. It was described by George Hampson in 1898. It is found in the lower Amazon region.

Lepidoptera and some other life forms have this as a synonym of Abnormipterus abnormis.
