= Sphecosoma melissa =

Scientific classification
- Domain: Eukaryota
- Kingdom: Animalia
- Phylum: Arthropoda
- Class: Insecta
- Order: Lepidoptera
- Superfamily: Noctuoidea
- Family: Erebidae
- Subfamily: Arctiinae
- Tribe: Arctiini
- Genus: Sphecosoma
- Species: S. melissa

Binomial name
- Sphecosoma melissa Schaus, 1896

Species of moth

Sphecosoma melissa is a moth in the subfamily Arctiinae. It was described by William Schaus in 1896. It is found in the Brazilian states of Santa Catarina and São Paulo.
