= Chrostosoma rica =

Scientific classification
- Domain: Eukaryota
- Kingdom: Animalia
- Phylum: Arthropoda
- Class: Insecta
- Order: Lepidoptera
- Superfamily: Noctuoidea
- Family: Erebidae
- Subfamily: Arctiinae
- Tribe: Arctiini
- Genus: Chrostosoma
- Species: C. rica

Binomial name
- Chrostosoma rica (Dognin, 1897)

Synonyms
- Pheia rica Dognin, 1897

Species of moth

Chrostosoma rica is a moth of the subfamily Arctiinae. It was described by Paul Dognin in 1897. It is found in Ecuador.
