= Aethria splendens =

Scientific classification
- Domain: Eukaryota
- Kingdom: Animalia
- Phylum: Arthropoda
- Class: Insecta
- Order: Lepidoptera
- Superfamily: Noctuoidea
- Family: Erebidae
- Subfamily: Arctiinae
- Tribe: Arctiini
- Genus: Aethria
- Species: A. splendens

Binomial name
- Aethria splendens (Jörgensen, 1935)

Synonyms
- Mesolasia splendens Jörgensen, 1935

Species of moth

Aethria splendens is a moth of the subfamily Arctiinae. It was described by Peter Jörgensen in 1935. It is found in Paraguay.
