= Apiconoma =

Scientific classification
- Kingdom: Animalia
- Phylum: Arthropoda
- Class: Insecta
- Order: Lepidoptera
- Superfamily: Noctuoidea
- Family: Erebidae
- Subfamily: Arctiinae
- Tribe: Arctiini
- Subtribe: Phaegopterina
- Genus: Apiconoma (Walker, 1854)

Genus of moths

Apiconoma is a genus of moths in the family Erebidae. The genus was erected by Francis Walker in 1854.

== Species ==
- Apiconoma mojui Laguerre, 2016 Brazil (Pará)
- Apiconoma opposita (Walker, 1854) Brazil (Amazonas), Suriname, French Guiana
- Apiconoma witti Laguerre, 2016 Brazil (Minas Gerais, Espirito Santo)
