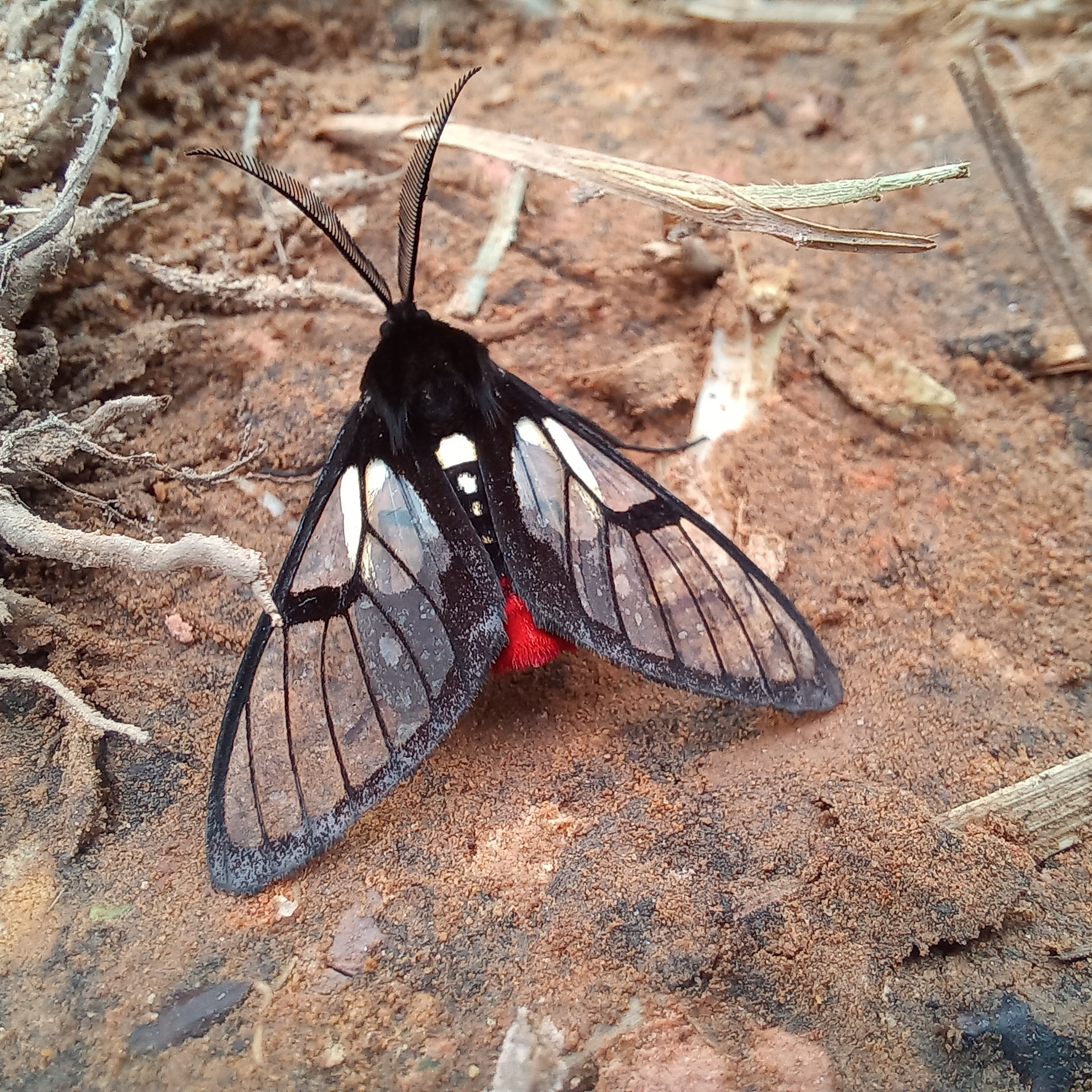
- Aethria melanobasis, Brazil

Scientific classification
- Kingdom: Animalia
- Phylum: Arthropoda
- Clade: Pancrustacea
- Class: Insecta
- Order: Lepidoptera
- Superfamily: Noctuoidea
- Family: Erebidae
- Subfamily: Arctiinae
- Tribe: Arctiini
- Genus: Aethria; Hübner, 1819

Synonyms
- Mesolasia Hampson, 1898

= Aethria =

Genus of moths

Aethria is a genus of tiger moths in the family Erebidae. There are about 13 described species in Aethria, found in the Neotropics.

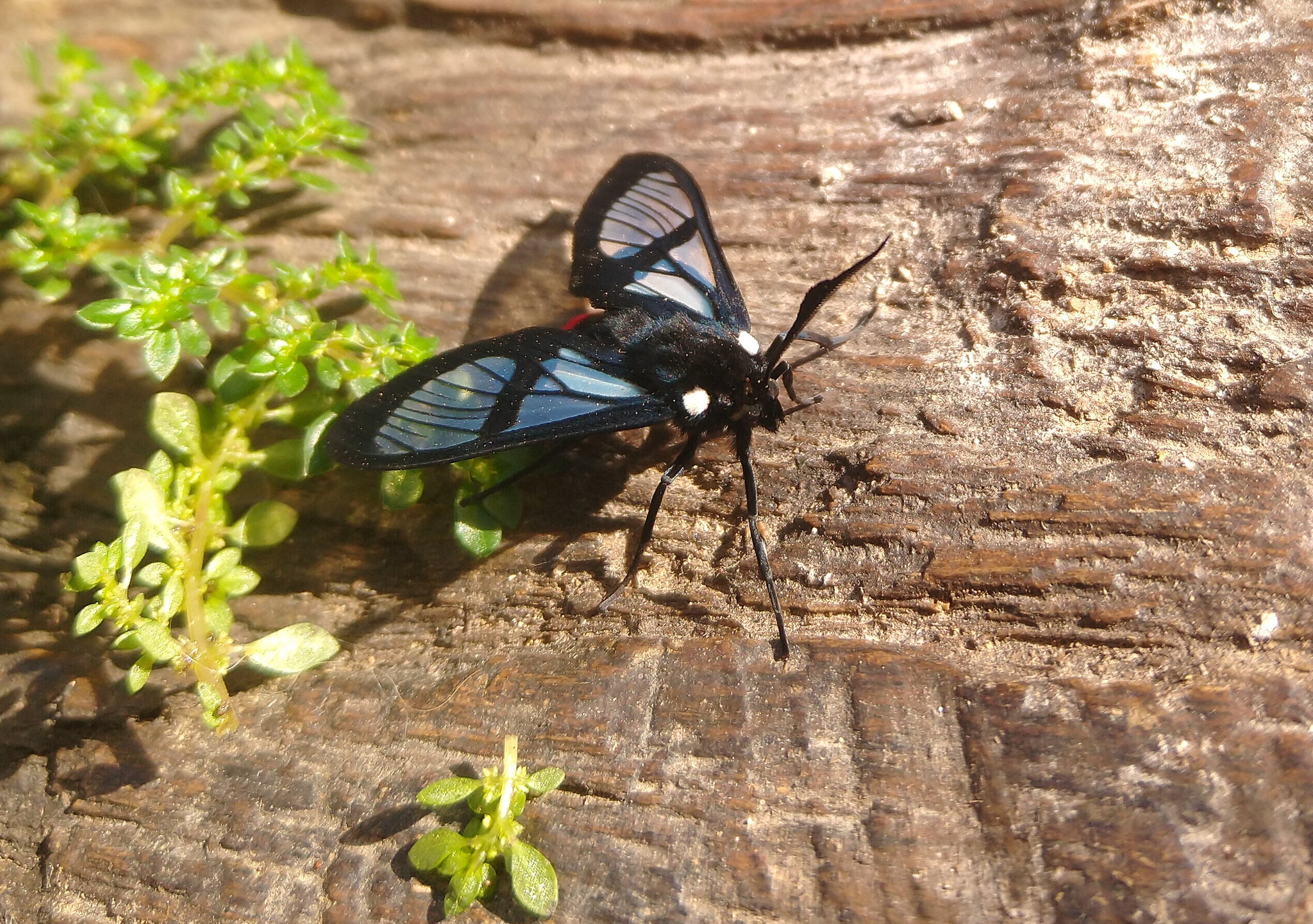
Aethria paula, Brasil

== Species ==
These 9 species belong to the genus Aethria:

- Aethria analis Schaus, 1901
- Aethria felderi Rothschild, 1911
- Aethria haemorrhoidalis Stoll, 1790
- Aethria hampsoni Dognin, 1902
- Aethria melanobasis Druce, 1897
- Aethria ornata Ménétriés, 1857
- Aethria paula Schaus, 1894
- Aethria pyroproctis Hampson, 1914
- Aethria splendens Jörgensen, 1935
