= Sphecosoma curta =

Scientific classification
- Domain: Eukaryota
- Kingdom: Animalia
- Phylum: Arthropoda
- Class: Insecta
- Order: Lepidoptera
- Superfamily: Noctuoidea
- Family: Erebidae
- Subfamily: Arctiinae
- Tribe: Arctiini
- Genus: Sphecosoma
- Species: S. curta

Binomial name
- Sphecosoma curta Rothschild, 1931

Species of moth

Sphecosoma curta is a moth in the subfamily Arctiinae. It was described by Rothschild in 1931. It is found in Peru.
