= Machadoia =

Scientific classification
- Domain: Eukaryota
- Kingdom: Animalia
- Phylum: Arthropoda
- Class: Insecta
- Order: Lepidoptera
- Superfamily: Noctuoidea
- Family: Erebidae
- Subfamily: Arctiinae
- Tribe: Arctiini
- Subtribe: Phaegopterina
- Genus: Machadoia; Régo Barros, 1956

Genus of moths

Machadoia is a genus of moths in the family Erebidae. The genus was erected by Alfredo Rei do Régo Barros in 1956 and contains three species found in Ecuador and Brazil.

== Species ==
- Machadoia diminuta (Walker, 1855)
- Machadoia extincta (Reich, 1935)
- Machadoia xanthosticta (Hampson, 1901)
