= Sphecosoma trinitatis =

Scientific classification
- Domain: Eukaryota
- Kingdom: Animalia
- Phylum: Arthropoda
- Class: Insecta
- Order: Lepidoptera
- Superfamily: Noctuoidea
- Family: Erebidae
- Subfamily: Arctiinae
- Tribe: Arctiini
- Genus: Sphecosoma
- Species: S. trinitatis

Binomial name
- Sphecosoma trinitatis Rothschild, 1911

Species of moth

Sphecosoma trinitatis is a moth belonging to the subfamily Arctiinae. It was discovered and described by Rothschild in 1911. It is a species native in Trinidad.
