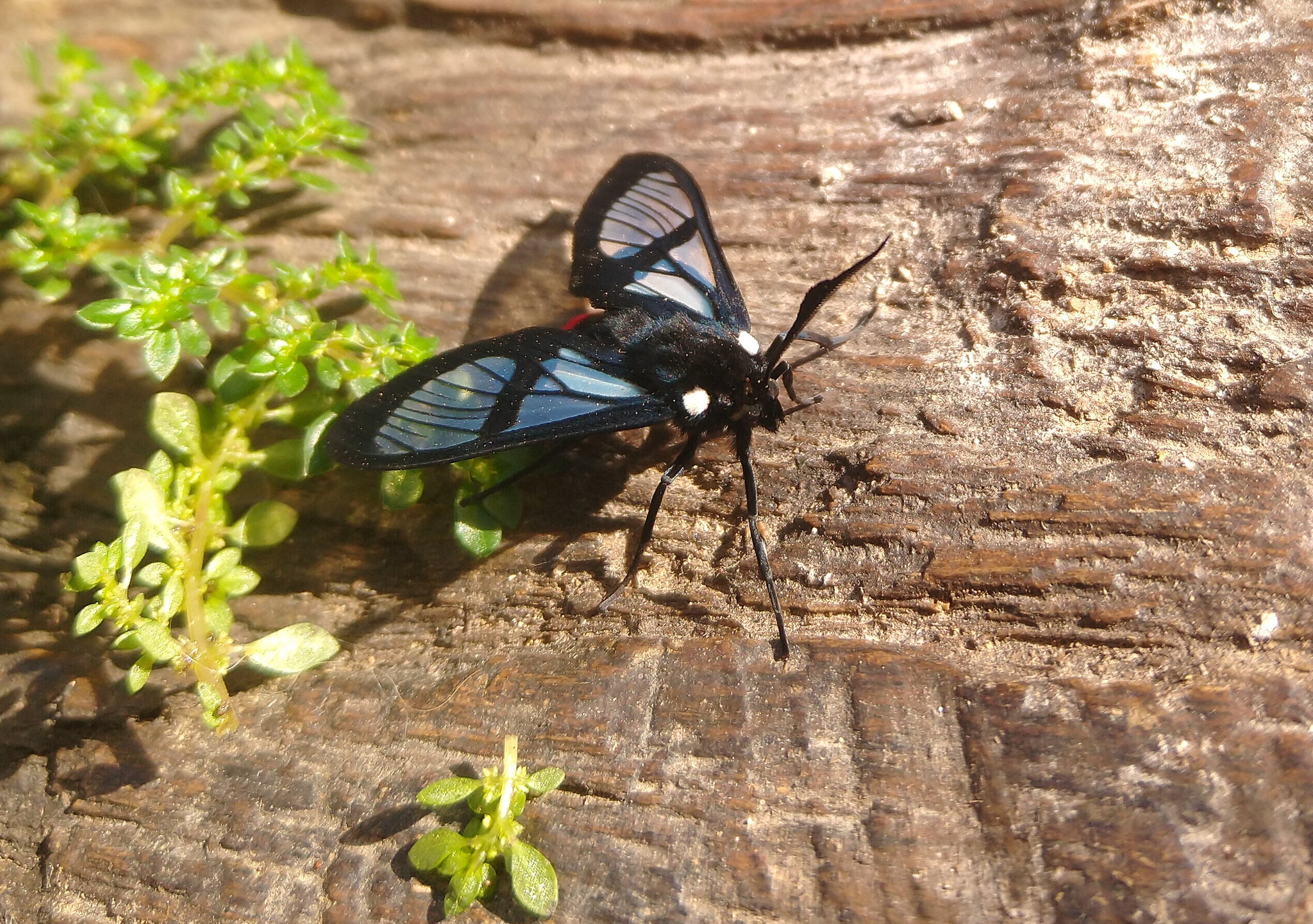
- Aethria paula, Brazil

Scientific classification
- Domain: Eukaryota
- Kingdom: Animalia
- Phylum: Arthropoda
- Class: Insecta
- Order: Lepidoptera
- Superfamily: Noctuoidea
- Family: Erebidae
- Subfamily: Arctiinae
- Tribe: Arctiini
- Genus: Aethria
- Species: A. paula

Binomial name
- Aethria paula Schaus, 1894

= Aethria paula =

Species of moth

Aethria paula is a moth of the subfamily Arctiinae. It was described by William Schaus in 1894. It is found in Brazil.
