= Chrostosoma chryseridia =

Scientific classification
- Domain: Eukaryota
- Kingdom: Animalia
- Phylum: Arthropoda
- Class: Insecta
- Order: Lepidoptera
- Superfamily: Noctuoidea
- Family: Erebidae
- Subfamily: Arctiinae
- Tribe: Arctiini
- Genus: Chrostosoma
- Species: C. chryseridia

Binomial name
- Chrostosoma chryseridia Draudt, 1915

Species of moth

Chrostosoma chryseridia is a moth of the subfamily Arctiinae. It was described by Max Wilhelm Karl Draudt in 1915.
