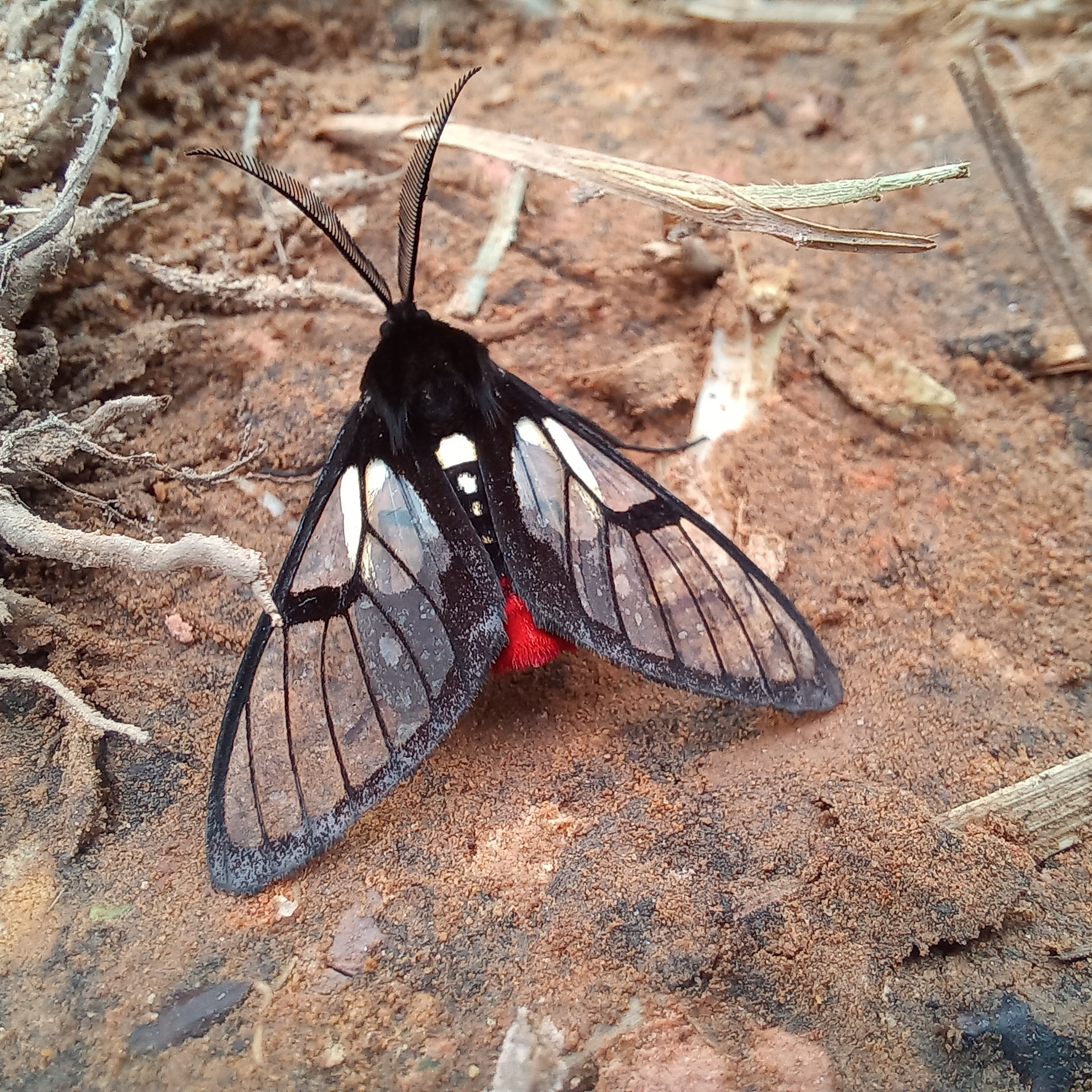
- Aethria melanobasis, Brazil

Scientific classification
- Domain: Eukaryota
- Kingdom: Animalia
- Phylum: Arthropoda
- Class: Insecta
- Order: Lepidoptera
- Superfamily: Noctuoidea
- Family: Erebidae
- Subfamily: Arctiinae
- Tribe: Arctiini
- Genus: Aethria
- Species: A. melanobasis

Binomial name
- Aethria melanobasis (H. Druce, 1897)

Synonyms
- Haematerion melanobasis H. Druce, 1897

= Aethria melanobasis =

Species of moth

Aethria melanobasis is a moth of the subfamily Arctiinae. It was described by Herbert Druce in 1897. It is found in Brazil.
