= Chrostosoma tricolor =

Scientific classification
- Domain: Eukaryota
- Kingdom: Animalia
- Phylum: Arthropoda
- Class: Insecta
- Order: Lepidoptera
- Superfamily: Noctuoidea
- Family: Erebidae
- Subfamily: Arctiinae
- Tribe: Arctiini
- Genus: Chrostosoma
- Species: C. tricolor

Binomial name
- Chrostosoma tricolor (Felder, 1868)

Synonyms
- Heterodontia tricolor Felder, 1874

Species of moth

Chrostosoma tricolor is a moth of the subfamily Arctiinae. It was described by Felder in 1868. It is found in the Amazon region.
