= Chrostosoma infuscatum =

Scientific classification
- Domain: Eukaryota
- Kingdom: Animalia
- Phylum: Arthropoda
- Class: Insecta
- Order: Lepidoptera
- Superfamily: Noctuoidea
- Family: Erebidae
- Subfamily: Arctiinae
- Tribe: Arctiini
- Genus: Chrostosoma
- Species: C. infuscatum

Binomial name
- Chrostosoma infuscatum Rothschild, 1931

Species of moth

Chrostosoma infuscatum is a moth of the subfamily Arctiinae. It was described by Walter Rothschild in 1931. It is found in Colombia and Ecuador.

The wingspan is about 27 mm.
