= Sphecosoma simile =

Scientific classification
- Domain: Eukaryota
- Kingdom: Animalia
- Phylum: Arthropoda
- Class: Insecta
- Order: Lepidoptera
- Superfamily: Noctuoidea
- Family: Erebidae
- Subfamily: Arctiinae
- Tribe: Arctiini
- Genus: Sphecosoma
- Species: S. simile

Binomial name
- Sphecosoma simile Schaus, 1894

Species of moth

Sphecosoma simile is a moth in the subfamily Arctiinae. It was described by William Schaus in 1894. It is found in Venezuela.
