= Sphecosoma melapera =

Scientific classification
- Domain: Eukaryota
- Kingdom: Animalia
- Phylum: Arthropoda
- Class: Insecta
- Order: Lepidoptera
- Superfamily: Noctuoidea
- Family: Erebidae
- Subfamily: Arctiinae
- Tribe: Arctiini
- Genus: Sphecosoma
- Species: S. melapera

Binomial name
- Sphecosoma melapera Dognin, 1909

Species of moth

Sphecosoma melapera is a moth in the subfamily Arctiinae. It was described by Paul Dognin in 1909. It is found in Colombia.
