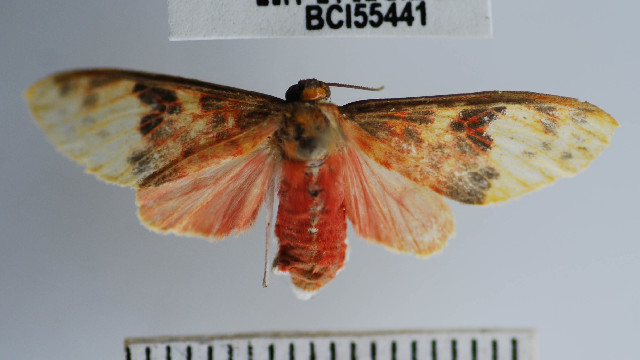
- Evius hippia

Scientific classification
- Kingdom: Animalia
- Phylum: Arthropoda
- Class: Insecta
- Order: Lepidoptera
- Superfamily: Noctuoidea
- Family: Erebidae
- Subfamily: Arctiinae
- Tribe: Arctiini
- Subtribe: Phaegopterina
- Genus: Evius; Walker, 1855

= Evius =

Genus of moths

Evius is a genus of moths in the family Erebidae. The genus was erected by Francis Walker in 1855.

== Species ==
- Evius albicoxae (Schaus, 1905)
- Evius aurococcinea Walker, 1855
- Evius cochenouri Schaus, 1910
- Evius hippia (Stoll, 1790)
- Evius lobata (Dognin, 1911)
- Evius venusta (Dognin, 1924)
