= Chrostosoma trimaculatum =

Scientific classification
- Domain: Eukaryota
- Kingdom: Animalia
- Phylum: Arthropoda
- Class: Insecta
- Order: Lepidoptera
- Superfamily: Noctuoidea
- Family: Erebidae
- Subfamily: Arctiinae
- Tribe: Arctiini
- Genus: Chrostosoma
- Species: C. trimaculatum

Binomial name
- Chrostosoma trimaculatum Strand, 1912

Species of moth

Chrostosoma trimaculatum is a moth of the subfamily Arctiinae. It was described by Strand in 1912. It is found in Peru.
