= Sphecosoma plumbicincta =

Scientific classification
- Domain: Eukaryota
- Kingdom: Animalia
- Phylum: Arthropoda
- Class: Insecta
- Order: Lepidoptera
- Superfamily: Noctuoidea
- Family: Erebidae
- Subfamily: Arctiinae
- Tribe: Arctiini
- Genus: Sphecosoma
- Species: S. plumbicincta

Binomial name
- Sphecosoma plumbicincta Draudt, 1915

Species of moth

Sphecosoma plumbicincta is a moth in the subfamily Arctiinae. It was described by Max Wilhelm Karl Draudt in 1915. It is found in Panama.
