= Ebertarctia =

Scientific classification
- Domain: Eukaryota
- Kingdom: Animalia
- Phylum: Arthropoda
- Class: Insecta
- Order: Lepidoptera
- Superfamily: Noctuoidea
- Family: Erebidae
- Subfamily: Arctiinae
- Subtribe: Micrarctiina
- Genus: Ebertarctia; Dubatolov, 2004

Genus of moths

Ebertarctia is a genus of tiger moths in the family Erebidae. These moths occur in Iran and Afghanistan.

== Taxonomy ==
Ebertarctia was established to make the genus Ocnogyna monophyletic. Some sources treat Ebertarctia as a synonym of Ocnogyna.

== Species ==
There are three recognized species:

- Ebertarctia afghanicola (Ebert, 1974)
- Ebertarctia nordstroemi (Brandt, 1947)
- Ebertarctia solitaria (Ebert, 1974)
