= Chrostosoma pellucida =

Scientific classification
- Domain: Eukaryota
- Kingdom: Animalia
- Phylum: Arthropoda
- Class: Insecta
- Order: Lepidoptera
- Superfamily: Noctuoidea
- Family: Erebidae
- Subfamily: Arctiinae
- Tribe: Arctiini
- Genus: Chrostosoma
- Species: C. pellucida

Binomial name
- Chrostosoma pellucida Schaus, 1905

Species of moth

Chrostosoma pellucida is a moth of the subfamily Arctiinae. It was described by William Schaus in 1905. It is found in Peru.
