= Sphecosoma vicinum =

Scientific classification
- Domain: Eukaryota
- Kingdom: Animalia
- Phylum: Arthropoda
- Class: Insecta
- Order: Lepidoptera
- Superfamily: Noctuoidea
- Family: Erebidae
- Subfamily: Arctiinae
- Tribe: Arctiini
- Genus: Sphecosoma
- Species: S. vicinum

Binomial name
- Sphecosoma vicinum Schrottky, 1910

Species of moth

Sphecosoma vicinum is a moth in the subfamily Arctiinae. It was described by Schrottky in 1910. It is found in Paraguay.
