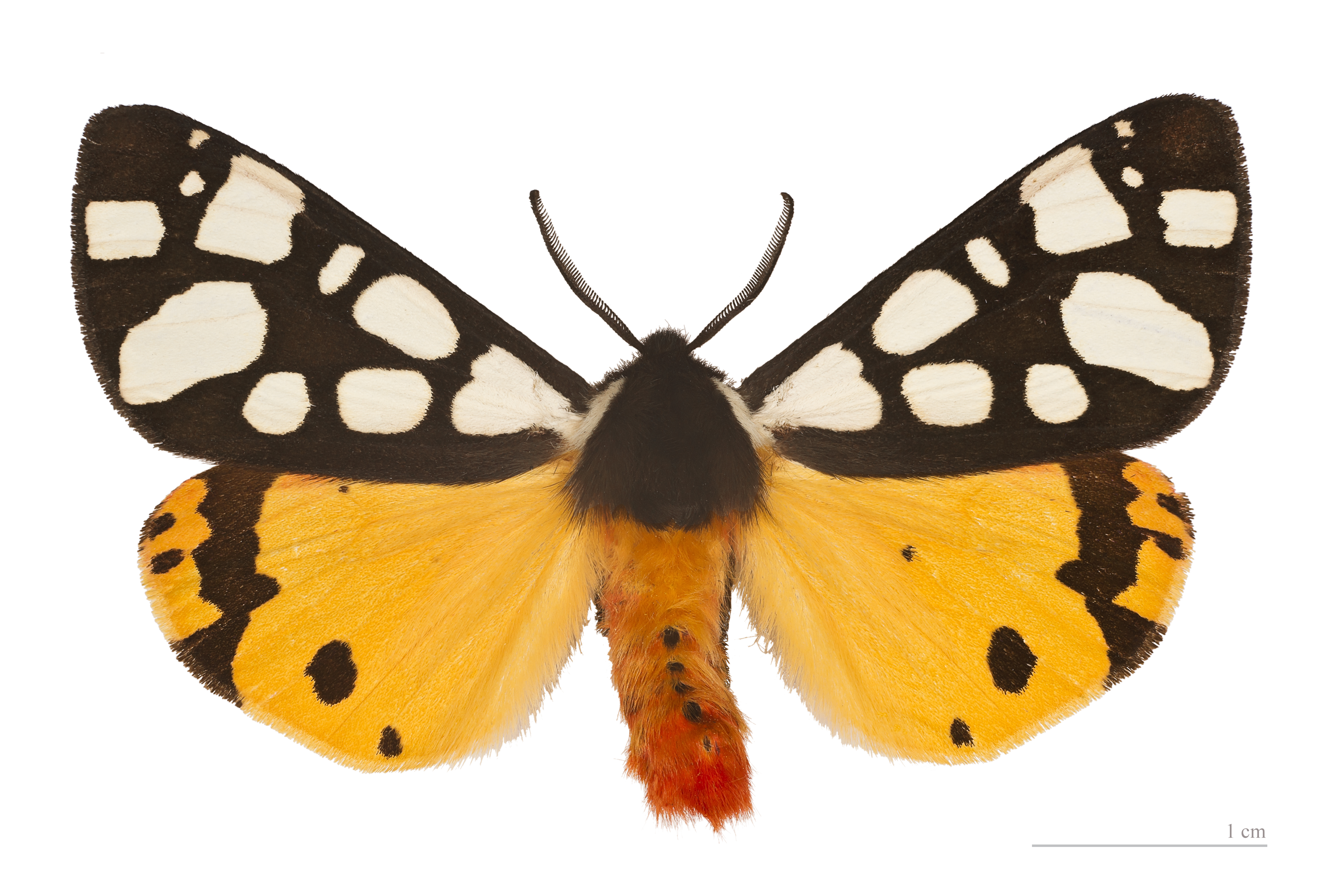
- Arctia villica

Scientific classification
- Domain: Eukaryota
- Kingdom: Animalia
- Phylum: Arthropoda
- Class: Insecta
- Order: Lepidoptera
- Superfamily: Noctuoidea
- Family: Erebidae
- Subfamily: Arctiinae
- Tribe: Arctiini
- Subtribe: Phaegopterina
- Genus: Arctiarpia; Travassos, 1951

= Arctiarpia =

Genus of moths

Arctiarpia is a genus of moths in the family Erebidae.

== Species ==
- Arctiarpia fluviatalis
- Arctiarpia melanopasta
- Arctiarpia mossi
