= Sphecosoma metamela =

Scientific classification
- Kingdom: Animalia
- Phylum: Arthropoda
- Class: Insecta
- Order: Lepidoptera
- Superfamily: Noctuoidea
- Family: Erebidae
- Subfamily: Arctiinae
- Tribe: Arctiini
- Genus: Sphecosoma
- Species: S. metamela

Binomial name
- Sphecosoma metamela Hampson, 1905

Species of moth

Sphecosoma metamela is a moth in the subfamily Arctiinae. It was described by George Hampson in 1905. It is found in Paraguay.
