= Chrostosoma guianensis =

Scientific classification
- Domain: Eukaryota
- Kingdom: Animalia
- Phylum: Arthropoda
- Class: Insecta
- Order: Lepidoptera
- Superfamily: Noctuoidea
- Family: Erebidae
- Subfamily: Arctiinae
- Tribe: Arctiini
- Genus: Chrostosoma
- Species: C. guianensis

Binomial name
- Chrostosoma guianensis Kaye, 1918

Species of moth

Chrostosoma guianensis is a moth of the subfamily Arctiinae. It was described by William James Kaye in 1918. It is found in Guyana.

The wingspan is about 28 mm. The forewings are hyaline (glass like), smoky, with dark scaling at the base, along the inner margin and at the apex. The hindwings are smoky hyaline, with the apex and inner margin narrowly darker.
