= Sphecosoma besasa =

Scientific classification
- Domain: Eukaryota
- Kingdom: Animalia
- Phylum: Arthropoda
- Class: Insecta
- Order: Lepidoptera
- Superfamily: Noctuoidea
- Family: Erebidae
- Subfamily: Arctiinae
- Tribe: Arctiini
- Genus: Sphecosoma
- Species: S. besasa

Binomial name
- Sphecosoma besasa Schaus, 1924

Species of moth

Sphecosoma besasa is a moth in the subfamily Arctiinae. It was described by Schaus in 1924. It is found in Brazil.
