= Sphecosoma surrentum =

Scientific classification
- Domain: Eukaryota
- Kingdom: Animalia
- Phylum: Arthropoda
- Class: Insecta
- Order: Lepidoptera
- Superfamily: Noctuoidea
- Family: Erebidae
- Subfamily: Arctiinae
- Tribe: Arctiini
- Genus: Sphecosoma
- Species: S. surrentum

Binomial name
- Sphecosoma surrentum H. Druce, 1883

Synonyms
- Sphecosoma surrenta Druce, 1883

Species of moth

Sphecosoma surrentum is a moth in the subfamily Arctiinae. It was described by Herbert Druce in 1883. It is found in Bolivia.
