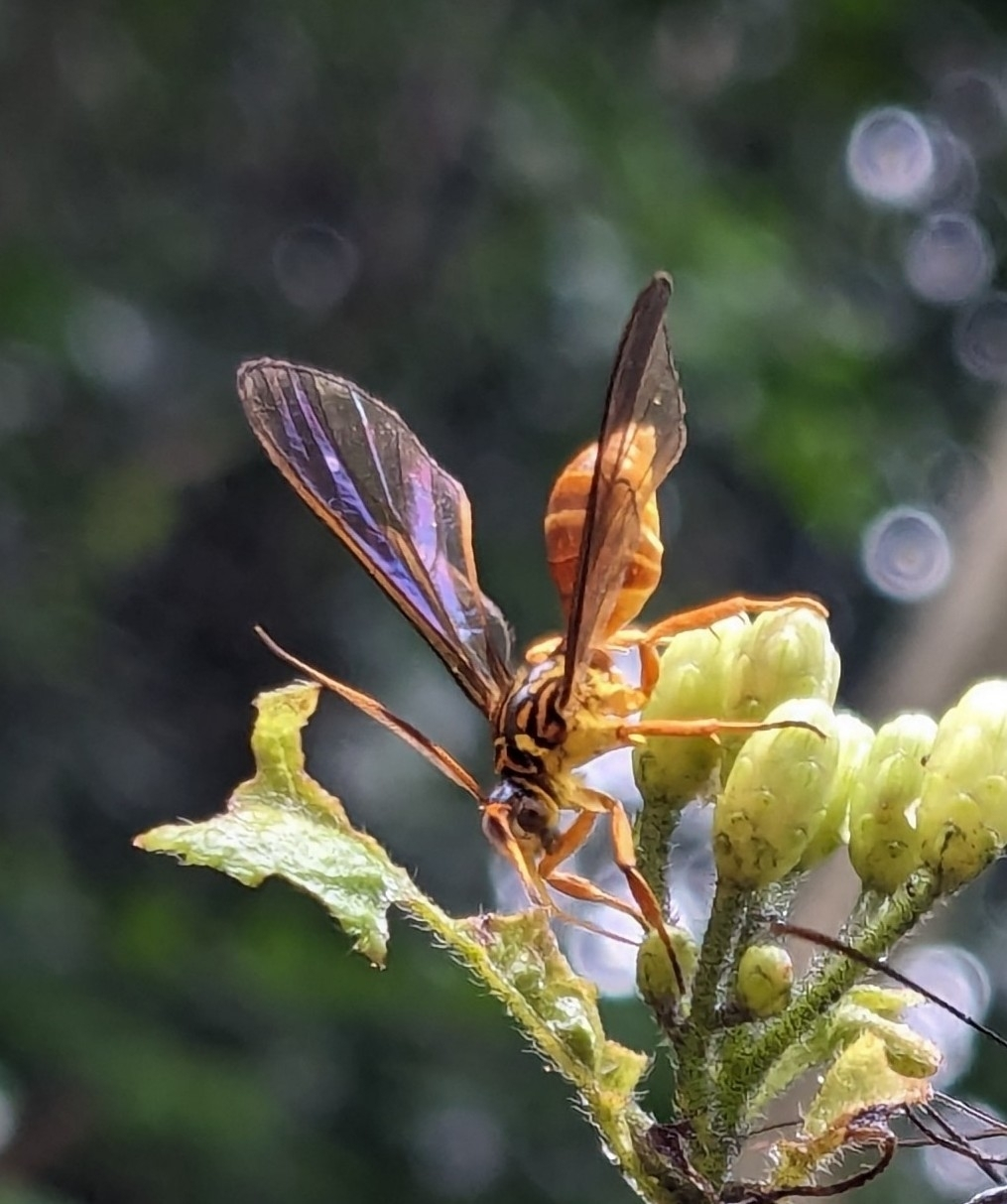

Scientific classification
- Kingdom: Animalia
- Phylum: Arthropoda
- Class: Insecta
- Order: Lepidoptera
- Superfamily: Noctuoidea
- Family: Erebidae
- Subfamily: Arctiinae
- Tribe: Arctiini
- Genus: Sphecosoma
- Species: S. testacea

Binomial name
- Sphecosoma testacea (Walker, 1854)

Synonyms
- Glaucopis testacea Walker, 1854

= Sphecosoma testacea =

Species of moth

Sphecosoma testacea is a species of moth in the subfamily Arctiinae. It was first described by Francis Walker in 1854. It is found in Guyana.
