= Aethria hampsoni =

Scientific classification
- Domain: Eukaryota
- Kingdom: Animalia
- Phylum: Arthropoda
- Class: Insecta
- Order: Lepidoptera
- Superfamily: Noctuoidea
- Family: Erebidae
- Subfamily: Arctiinae
- Tribe: Arctiini
- Genus: Aethria
- Species: A. hampsoni

Binomial name
- Aethria hampsoni Dognin, 1902

Species of moth

Aethria hampsoni is a moth of the subfamily Arctiinae. It was described by Paul Dognin in 1902. It is found in Venezuela.
