= Machadoia xanthosticta =

Scientific classification
- Kingdom: Animalia
- Phylum: Arthropoda
- Class: Insecta
- Order: Lepidoptera
- Superfamily: Noctuoidea
- Family: Erebidae
- Subfamily: Arctiinae
- Genus: Machadoia
- Species: M. xanthosticta

Binomial name
- Machadoia xanthosticta (Hampson, 1901)

Synonyms
- Hemihyalea xanthosticta Hampson, 1901; Hemihyalea xanthosticta Rothschild, 1910

Species of moth

Machadoia xanthosticta is a moth in the subfamily Arctiinae. It was described by George Hampson in 1901. It is found in Ecuador and the Brazilian state of Rio de Janeiro.
