= Demolis albicostata =

Scientific classification
- Domain: Eukaryota
- Kingdom: Animalia
- Phylum: Arthropoda
- Class: Insecta
- Order: Lepidoptera
- Superfamily: Noctuoidea
- Family: Erebidae
- Subfamily: Arctiinae
- Genus: Demolis
- Species: D. albicostata

Binomial name
- Demolis albicostata Hampson, 1901

Synonyms
- Premolis eugenia Jörgensen, 1935; Demolis eugenia (Jörgensen, 1935)

Species of moth

Demolis albicostata is a moth of the family Erebidae first described by George Hampson in 1901. It is found in Paraguay and Brazil.
