= Evius aurococcinea =

Scientific classification
- Kingdom: Animalia
- Phylum: Arthropoda
- Class: Insecta
- Order: Lepidoptera
- Superfamily: Noctuoidea
- Family: Erebidae
- Subfamily: Arctiinae
- Genus: Evius
- Species: E. aurococcinea

Binomial name
- Evius aurococcinea Walker, 1855

Species of moth

Evius aurococcinea is a moth of the family Erebidae. It was described by Francis Walker in 1855. It is found in Brazil.
