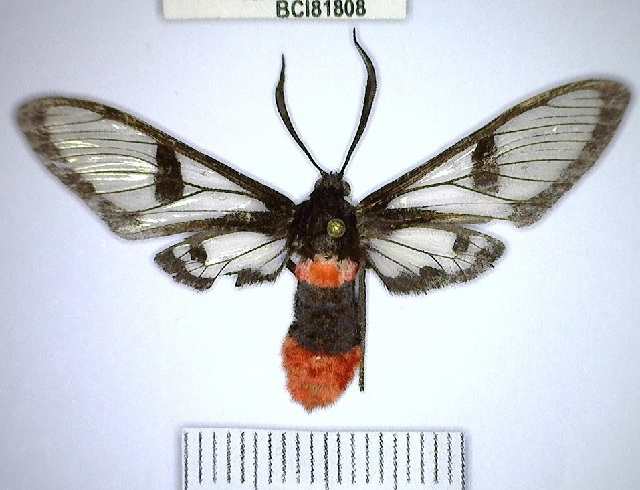

Scientific classification
- Domain: Eukaryota
- Kingdom: Animalia
- Phylum: Arthropoda
- Class: Insecta
- Order: Lepidoptera
- Superfamily: Noctuoidea
- Family: Erebidae
- Subfamily: Arctiinae
- Genus: Aethria
- Species: A. haemorrhoidalis

Binomial name
- Aethria haemorrhoidalis Stoll, 1790

Synonyms
- Sphinx haemorrhoidalis Stoll, 1790; Aethria haemorrhusa Hübner, 1826

= Aethria haemorrhoidalis =

Species of moth

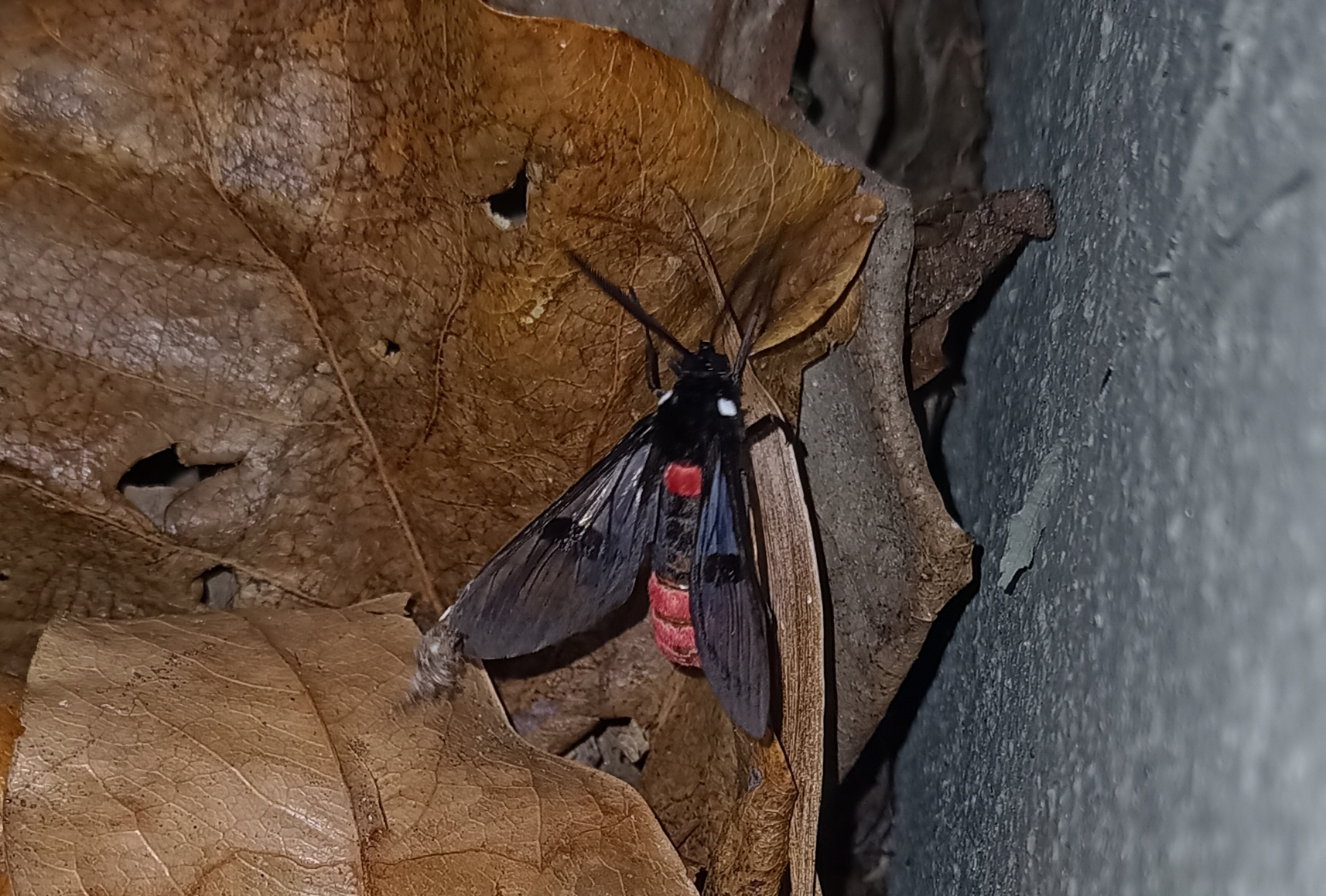
Aethria haemorrhoidalis, Brazil

Aethria haemorrhoidalis is a moth of the subfamily Arctiinae. It was described by Stoll in 1790. It is found in Belize, Ecuador, Guyana, Suriname and Brazil.
