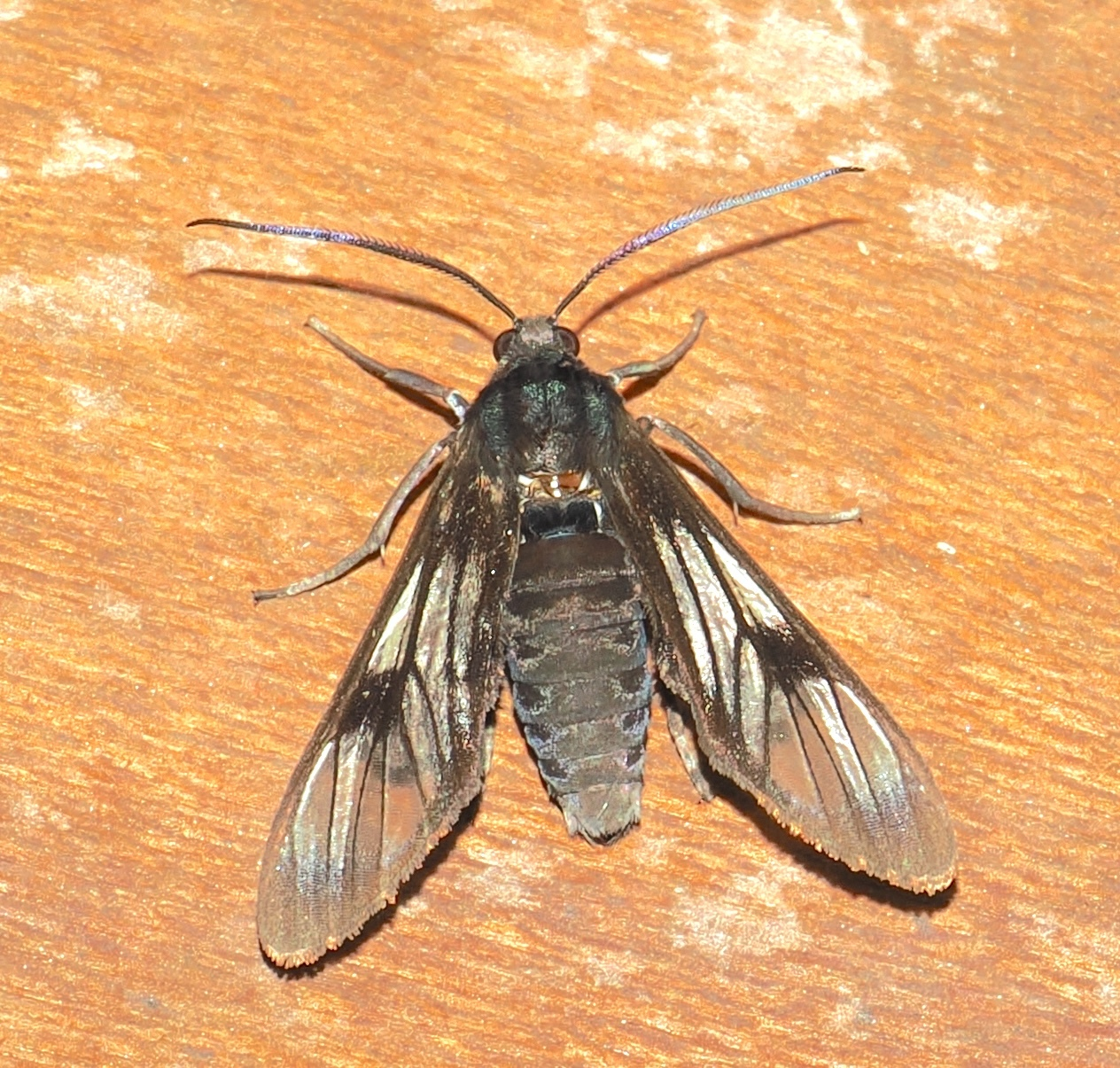
- Chrostosoma, Colombia

Scientific classification
- Kingdom: Animalia
- Phylum: Arthropoda
- Clade: Pancrustacea
- Class: Insecta
- Order: Lepidoptera
- Superfamily: Noctuoidea
- Family: Erebidae
- Subfamily: Arctiinae
- Tribe: Arctiini
- Genus: Chrostosoma; Hübner, [1819]

Synonyms
- Heterodontia Felder, 1874

= Chrostosoma =

Genus of moths

Chrostosoma is a genus of moths in the subfamily Arctiinae, found in Mexico, Central America, and South America.

This genus was erected by Jacob Hübner in 1819.

== Species ==
These 29 species belong to the genus Chrostosoma:

- Chrostosoma cardinale Schaus, 1898
- Chrostosoma chalconitis Druce, 1883
- Chrostosoma chryseridia Draudt, 1915
- Chrostosoma destricta Draudt, 1915
- Chrostosoma dhamis Schaus, 1920
- Chrostosoma dolens Walker, 1854
- Chrostosoma echemus Stoll, 1782
- Chrostosoma enna Schaus, 1924
- Chrostosoma fassli Draudt, 1915
- Chrostosoma fenestrina Butler, 1876
- Chrostosoma guianensis Kaye
- Chrostosoma haematica Perty, 1834
- Chrostosoma halli Kaye
- Chrostosoma infuscatum Rothschild, 1931
- Chrostosoma lea Schaus, 1924
- Chrostosoma mediana Schaus, 1928
- Chrostosoma mysia Druce, 1906
- Chrostosoma patricia Schaus, 1912
- Chrostosoma pellucida Schaus, 1905
- Chrostosoma plagiata Rothschild, 1911
- Chrostosoma rica Dognin, 1897
- Chrostosoma schausi Rothschild, 1911
- Chrostosoma semirubra Hampson, 1898
- Chrostosoma stulta Herrich-Schäffer, 1854
- Chrostosoma tabascensis Dyar, 1916
- Chrostosoma tricolor Felder, 1868
- Chrostosoma trimaculatum Strand, 1912
- Chrostosoma unxa Druce, 1896
- Chrostosoma viridipunctata Rothschild, 1911
