= Machadoia extincta =

Scientific classification
- Domain: Eukaryota
- Kingdom: Animalia
- Phylum: Arthropoda
- Class: Insecta
- Order: Lepidoptera
- Superfamily: Noctuoidea
- Family: Erebidae
- Subfamily: Arctiinae
- Genus: Machadoia
- Species: M. extincta

Binomial name
- Machadoia extincta (Reich, 1935)

Synonyms
- Hemihyalea extincta Reich, 1935; Pseudohemihyalea extincta

Species of moth

Machadoia extincta is a moth in the subfamily Arctiinae. It was described by Reich in 1935. It is found in the Brazilian state of São Paulo.
