= Demolis albitegula =

Scientific classification
- Domain: Eukaryota
- Kingdom: Animalia
- Phylum: Arthropoda
- Class: Insecta
- Order: Lepidoptera
- Superfamily: Noctuoidea
- Family: Erebidae
- Subfamily: Arctiinae
- Genus: Demolis
- Species: D. albitegula

Binomial name
- Demolis albitegula (Rothschild, 1935)

Synonyms
- Evius albitegula Rothschild, 1935; Automolis niveolineata Reich, 1935

Species of moth

Demolis albitegula is a moth of the family Erebidae first described by Walter Rothschild in 1935. It is found in Brazil.
