= Chrostosoma cardinale =

Scientific classification
- Domain: Eukaryota
- Kingdom: Animalia
- Phylum: Arthropoda
- Class: Insecta
- Order: Lepidoptera
- Superfamily: Noctuoidea
- Family: Erebidae
- Subfamily: Arctiinae
- Genus: Chrostosoma
- Species: C. cardinale

Binomial name
- Chrostosoma cardinale Schaus, 1898

Synonyms
- Chrostosoma cardinalis Schaus, 1898

Species of moth

Chrostosoma cardinale is a moth of the subfamily Arctiinae. It was described by William Schaus in 1898. It is found in Colombia.
