= Apiconoma opposita =

Scientific classification
- Kingdom: Animalia
- Phylum: Arthropoda
- Class: Insecta
- Order: Lepidoptera
- Superfamily: Noctuoidea
- Family: Erebidae
- Subfamily: Arctiinae
- Genus: Apiconoma
- Species: A. opposita

Binomial name
- Apiconoma opposita (Walker, 1854)

Synonyms
- Euchromia opposita Walker, 1854; Euplesia ochrophila Felder & Rogenhofer, 1874; Delphyre aclytioides Hampson, 1901

Species of moth

Apiconoma opposita is a species of moth in the subfamily Arctiinae (tiger moths and wasp moths) of the family Erebidae. The species was first described by the English entomologist Francis Walker in 1854. It is native to northern South America, with recorded occurrences in the Brazilian state of Amazonas, French Guiana, and Suriname.

== Taxonomy ==
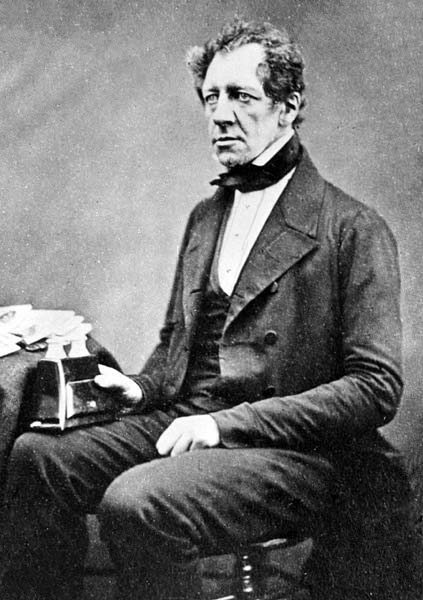
English entomologist Francis Walker, who first described the species in 1854

The species was originally described as Euchromia opposita by Walker based on a male holotype specimen collected in Brazil, which is currently housed in the Natural History Museum, London. It was later transferred to the genus Apiconoma.

Throughout its taxonomic history, the species has been described under several synonyms. In 1874, Cajetan and Alois Friedrich Rogenhofer described the synonym Euplesia ochrophila, and in 1901, George Francis Hampson described Delphyre aclytioides from a female specimen collected in Cayenne, French Guiana. The latter was formally synonymized with A. opposita by Michel Laguerre in 2016.

== See also ==
- List of moths of South America
