= Migoplastis correcta =

Scientific classification
- Kingdom: Animalia
- Phylum: Arthropoda
- Class: Insecta
- Order: Lepidoptera
- Superfamily: Noctuoidea
- Family: Erebidae
- Subfamily: Arctiinae
- Genus: Migoplastis
- Species: M. correcta

Binomial name
- Migoplastis correcta (Walker, [1865])

Synonyms
- Hypsa correcta Walker, [1865]; Migoplastis ceylonica Felder, 1868

Species of moth

Migoplastis correcta is a moth of the subfamily Arctiinae first described by Francis Walker in 1865. It is found in Sri Lanka.

== Description ==
Hindwing of male not excised at anal angle. veins 6 and 7 from cell. The branches of antennae are long. Head and thorax ochreous brown. A black speck on vertex of head present. Two specks on collar, two on each patagium and one each on each thoracic segment can be seen. Abdomen yellowish with a dorsal and two lateral paired series of black spots. Forewing ochreous brown with a wide indistinct post-medial paler band, only defined on the disk. Hindwings are yellowish.
