= Machadoia diminuta =

Scientific classification
- Kingdom: Animalia
- Phylum: Arthropoda
- Class: Insecta
- Order: Lepidoptera
- Superfamily: Noctuoidea
- Family: Erebidae
- Subfamily: Arctiinae
- Genus: Machadoia
- Species: M. diminuta

Binomial name
- Machadoia diminuta (Walker, 1855)

Synonyms
- Halesidota diminuta Walker, 1855; Hemihyalea diminuta; Pseudohemihyalea diminuta

Species of moth

Machadoia diminuta is a moth in the subfamily Arctiinae. It was described by Francis Walker in 1855. It is found in Brazil.
