= Migoplastis alba =

Scientific classification
- Domain: Eukaryota
- Kingdom: Animalia
- Phylum: Arthropoda
- Class: Insecta
- Order: Lepidoptera
- Superfamily: Noctuoidea
- Family: Erebidae
- Subfamily: Arctiinae
- Genus: Migoplastis
- Species: M. alba

Binomial name
- Migoplastis alba (Moore, 1877)

Synonyms
- Dondera alba Moore, 1877

Species of moth

Migoplastis alba is a moth of the subfamily Arctiinae, first described by Frederic Moore in 1877. It is found in Sri Lanka.

== Description ==
Hindwing of male excised, folded and lobed at anal angle. The branches of antennae shorter. Head and thorax yellowish white in color. Vertex of head with a black dot. The spots on thorax as in Paraplastis hampsoni except pair of spots on pro-thorax found in M. alba. Abdomen yellow with a series of dorsal black bands and two paired series of lateral spots. Forewings are pure white. Hindwings with a slight fuscous tinged. Hindwing with veins 6 and 7 arise from cell. Ventral side is fuscous.
