= Evius lobata =

Scientific classification
- Domain: Eukaryota
- Kingdom: Animalia
- Phylum: Arthropoda
- Class: Insecta
- Order: Lepidoptera
- Superfamily: Noctuoidea
- Family: Erebidae
- Subfamily: Arctiinae
- Genus: Evius
- Species: E. lobata

Binomial name
- Evius lobata (Dognin, 1911)

Synonyms
- Parevia lobata Dognin, 1911

Species of moth

Evius lobata is a moth of the family Erebidae. It was described by Paul Dognin in 1911. It is found in Colombia and French Guiana.
