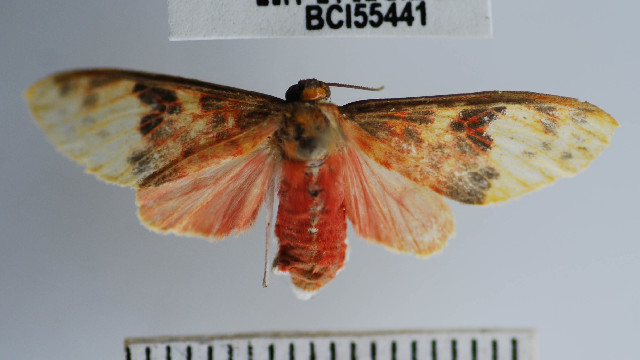

Scientific classification
- Domain: Eukaryota
- Kingdom: Animalia
- Phylum: Arthropoda
- Class: Insecta
- Order: Lepidoptera
- Superfamily: Noctuoidea
- Family: Erebidae
- Subfamily: Arctiinae
- Genus: Evius
- Species: E. hippia

Binomial name
- Evius hippia (Stoll, 1790)

Synonyms
- Phalaena hippia Stoll, [1790]; Automolis albicollis Walker, [1865]; Idalus lemba Druce, 1890; Prumala pyrostrota Dognin, 1908

= Evius hippia =

Species of moth

Evius hippia is a moth of the family Erebidae. It was described by Caspar Stoll in 1790. It is found in Mexico, Panama, Trinidad, French Guiana, Colombia, Suriname, Venezuela and Brazil.
