= Arctiarpia mossi =

Scientific classification
- Domain: Eukaryota
- Kingdom: Animalia
- Phylum: Arthropoda
- Class: Insecta
- Order: Lepidoptera
- Superfamily: Noctuoidea
- Family: Erebidae
- Subfamily: Arctiinae
- Genus: Arctiarpia
- Species: A. mossi

Binomial name
- Arctiarpia mossi (Rothschild, 1922)

Synonyms
- Idalus mossi Rothschild, 1922; Idalus mossi fluviatalis Rothschild, 1922; Idalus melanopasta Dognin, 1907; Arctiarpia melanopasta (Dognin, 1907)

Species of moth

Arctiarpia mossi is a moth of the subfamily Arctiinae first described by Walter Rothschild in 1922. It is found in Guyana, French Guiana, Peru and Amazonas.

== Subspecies ==
- Arctiarpia mossi mossi
- Arctiarpia mossi fluviatalis (Rothschild, 1922)
- Arctiarpia mossi melanopasta Dognin, 1907 (French Guiana)
