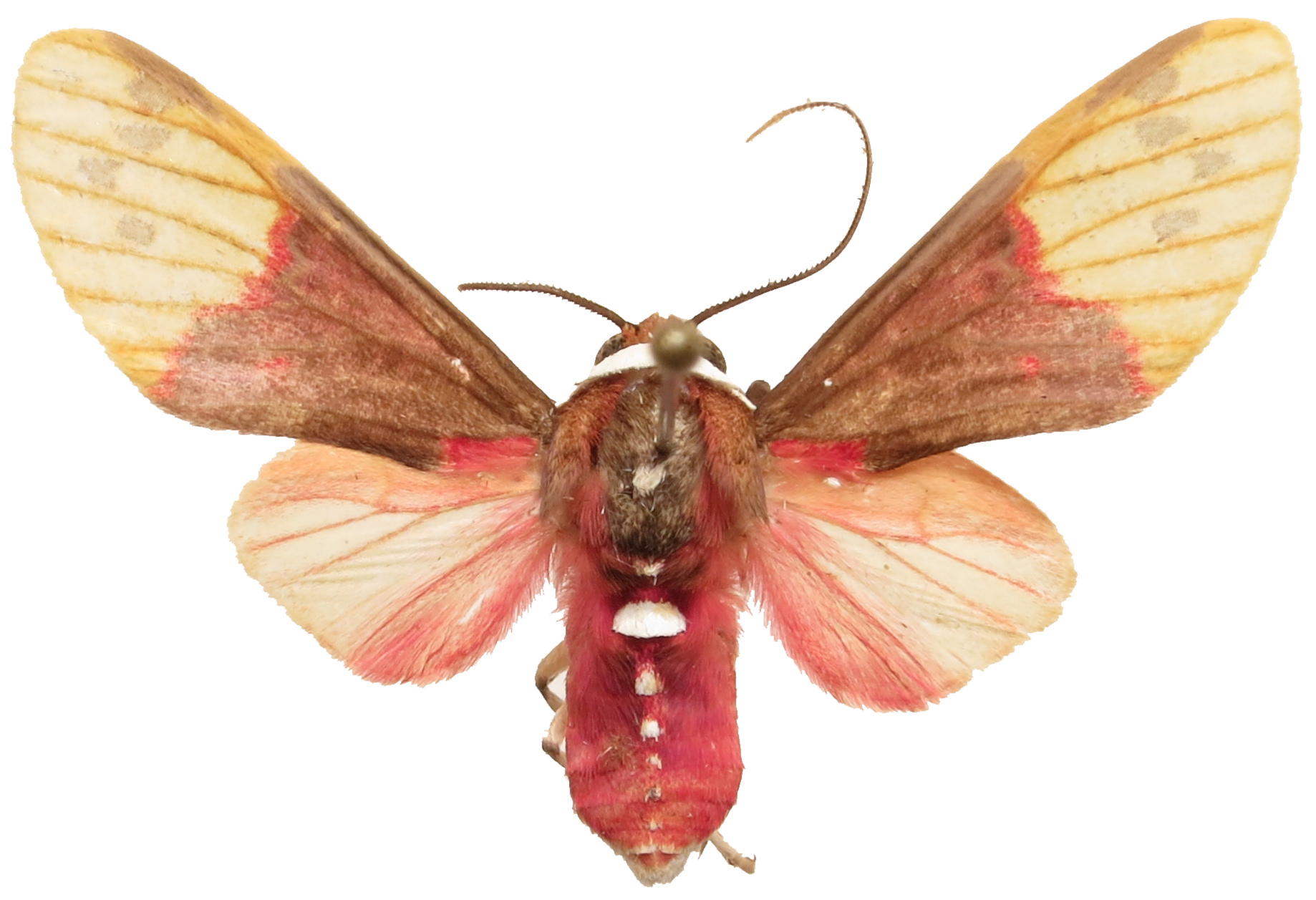
- From French Guiana

Scientific classification
- Kingdom: Animalia
- Phylum: Arthropoda
- Class: Insecta
- Order: Lepidoptera
- Superfamily: Noctuoidea
- Family: Erebidae
- Subfamily: Arctiinae
- Genus: Eucyrta
- Species: E. albicollis

Binomial name
- Eucyrta albicollis Felder, 1874

= Eucyrta albicollis =

Species of moth

Eucyrta albicollis is a moth of the subfamily Arctiinae first described by Felder in 1874. It is found in Brazil, Peru and French Guiana.
