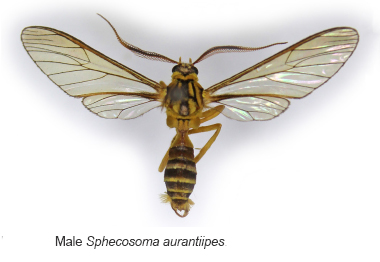

Scientific classification
- Domain: Eukaryota
- Kingdom: Animalia
- Phylum: Arthropoda
- Class: Insecta
- Order: Lepidoptera
- Superfamily: Noctuoidea
- Family: Erebidae
- Subfamily: Arctiinae
- Genus: Sphecosoma
- Species: S. aurantiipes

Binomial name
- Sphecosoma aurantiipes Rothschild, 1911

= Sphecosoma aurantiipes =

Species of moth

Sphecosoma aurantiipes is a moth in the subfamily Arctiinae. It was described by Rothschild in 1911, and is found in Venezuela, Paraguay, and Bolivia.
