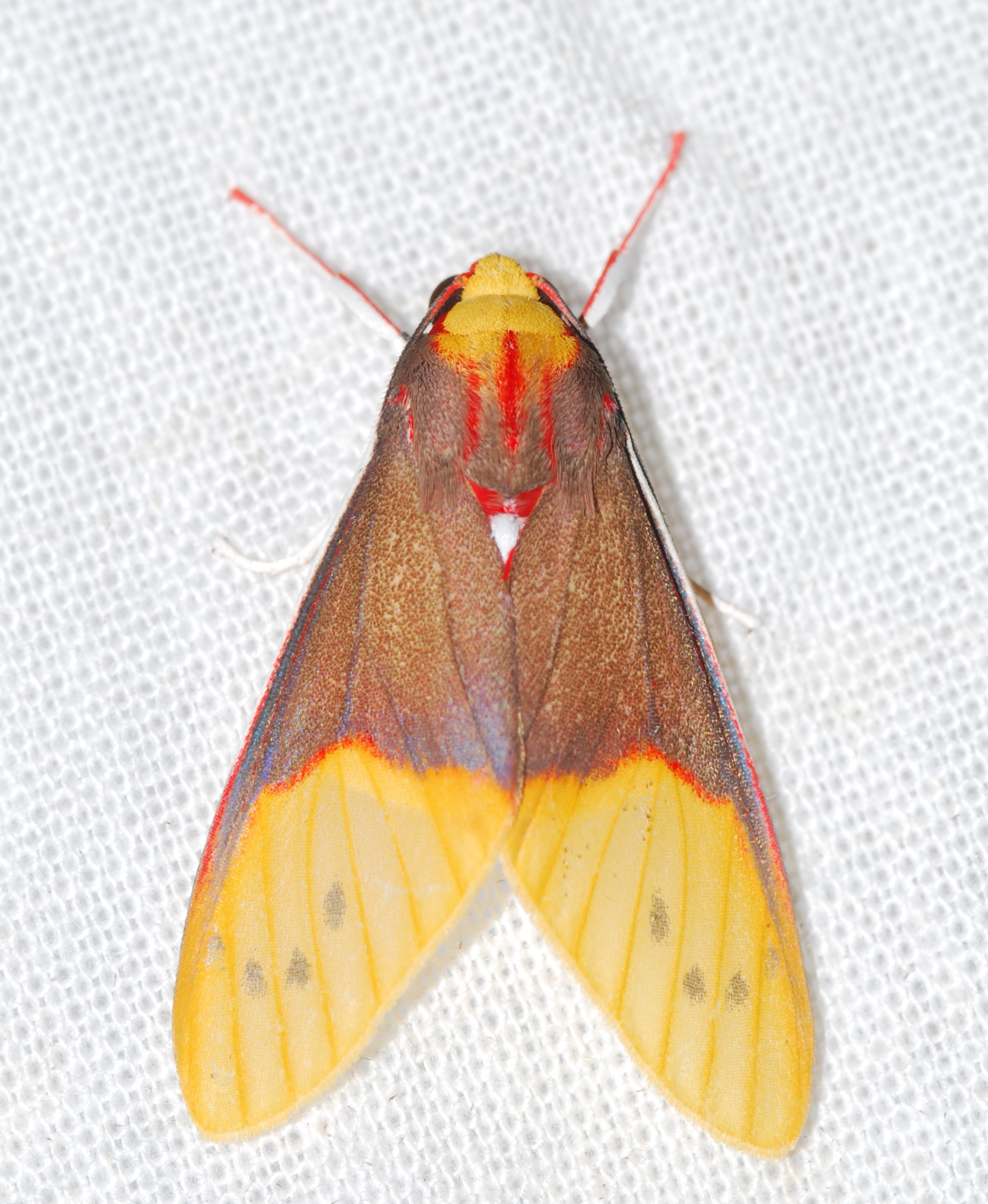

Scientific classification
- Domain: Eukaryota
- Kingdom: Animalia
- Phylum: Arthropoda
- Class: Insecta
- Order: Lepidoptera
- Superfamily: Noctuoidea
- Family: Erebidae
- Subfamily: Arctiinae
- Genus: Evius
- Species: E. albicoxae

Binomial name
- Evius albicoxae (Schaus, 1905)

Synonyms
- Idalus albicoxae Schaus, 1905; Demolis flavithorax Rothschild, 1909; Premolis flavithorax (Rothschild, 1909)

= Evius albicoxae =

Species of moth

Evius albicoxae is a moth of the family Erebidae. It was described by William Schaus in 1905. It is found in French Guiana and Peru.
