= Sphecosoma nigriceps =

Species of moth

Sphecosoma nigriceps is a moth in the subfamily Arctiinae. It was described by George Hampson in 1903. It is found in Bolivia.
