= Evius venusta =

Scientific classification
- Kingdom: Animalia
- Phylum: Arthropoda
- Class: Insecta
- Order: Lepidoptera
- Superfamily: Noctuoidea
- Family: Erebidae
- Subfamily: Arctiinae
- Genus: Evius
- Species: E. venusta

Binomial name
- Evius venusta (Dognin, 1924)

Synonyms
- Eriostepta venusta Dognin, 1924; Eucyrta venusta

Species of moth

Evius venusta is a moth of the subfamily Arctiinae first described by Paul Dognin in 1924. It is found in Brazil and French Guiana.
