= Micrarctiina =

Scientific classification
- Kingdom: Animalia
- Phylum: Arthropoda
- Class: Insecta
- Order: Lepidoptera
- Superfamily: Noctuoidea
- Family: Erebidae
- Subfamily: Arctiinae
- Tribe: Arctiini
- Subtribe: Micrarctiina; Seitz, 1910

Subtribe of moths

The Micrarctiina are a subtribe of woolly bear moths in the family Erebidae. Many of these moths are of small or medium size and have bright-colored hindwings.

== Taxonomy ==
The subtribe was previously classified as the tribe Micrarctiini of the former family Arctiidae. In recent years, most of the genera of Micrarctiina have been moved to other (sub)tribes, leaving Micrarctia trigona as the only genus and species in the subtribe, although a second species was recently described, Micrarctia trigona (Saldaitis & Pekarsky, 2015). Micrarctia was placed in the subtribe Arctiina by Rönkä et al. in 2016.
