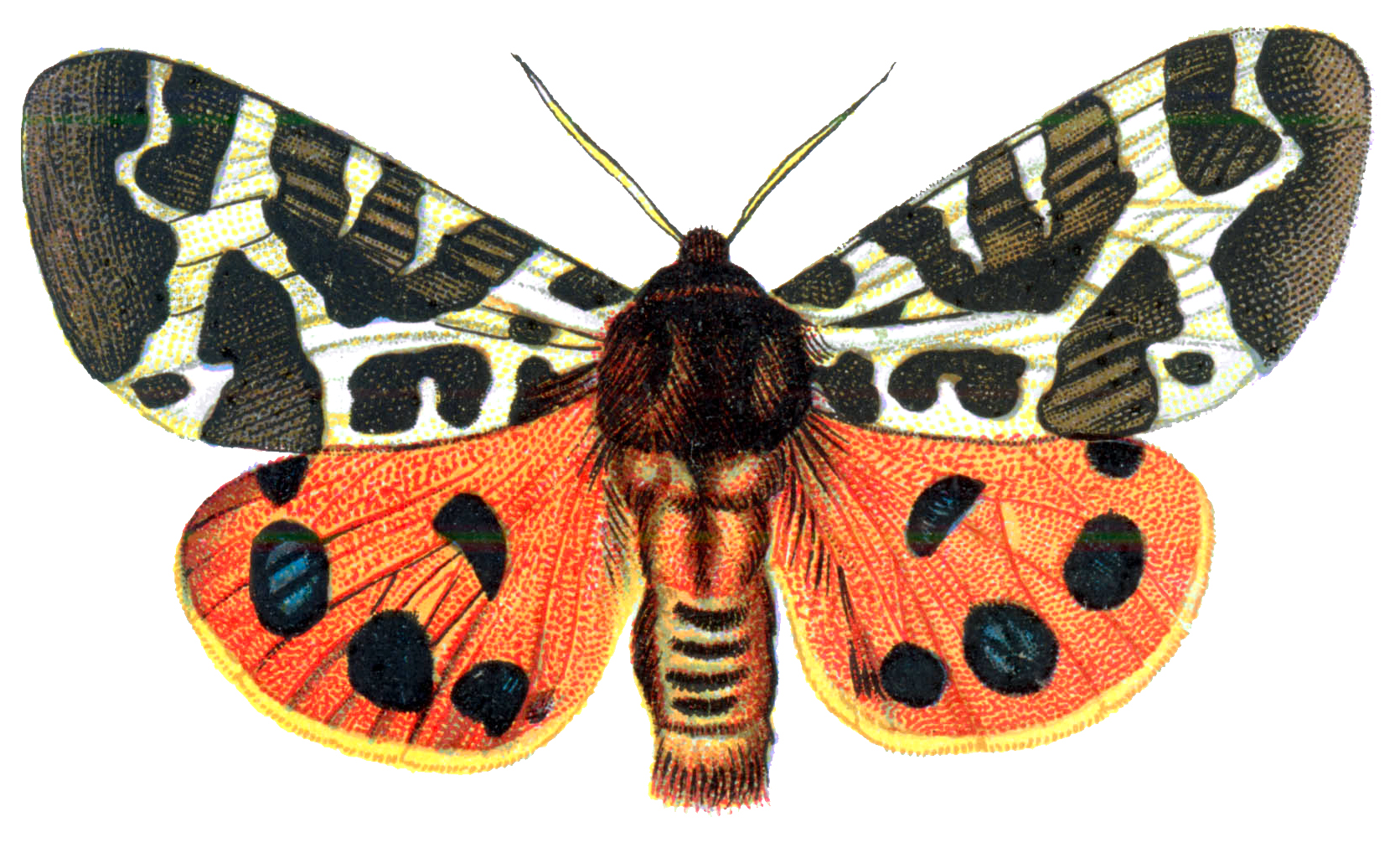
- Garden tiger moth (Arctia caja)

Scientific classification
- Kingdom: Animalia
- Phylum: Arthropoda
- Clade: Pancrustacea
- Class: Insecta
- Order: Lepidoptera
- Superfamily: Noctuoidea
- Family: Erebidae
- Subfamily: Arctiinae
- Tribe: Arctiini

= Arctiini =

Tribe of moths

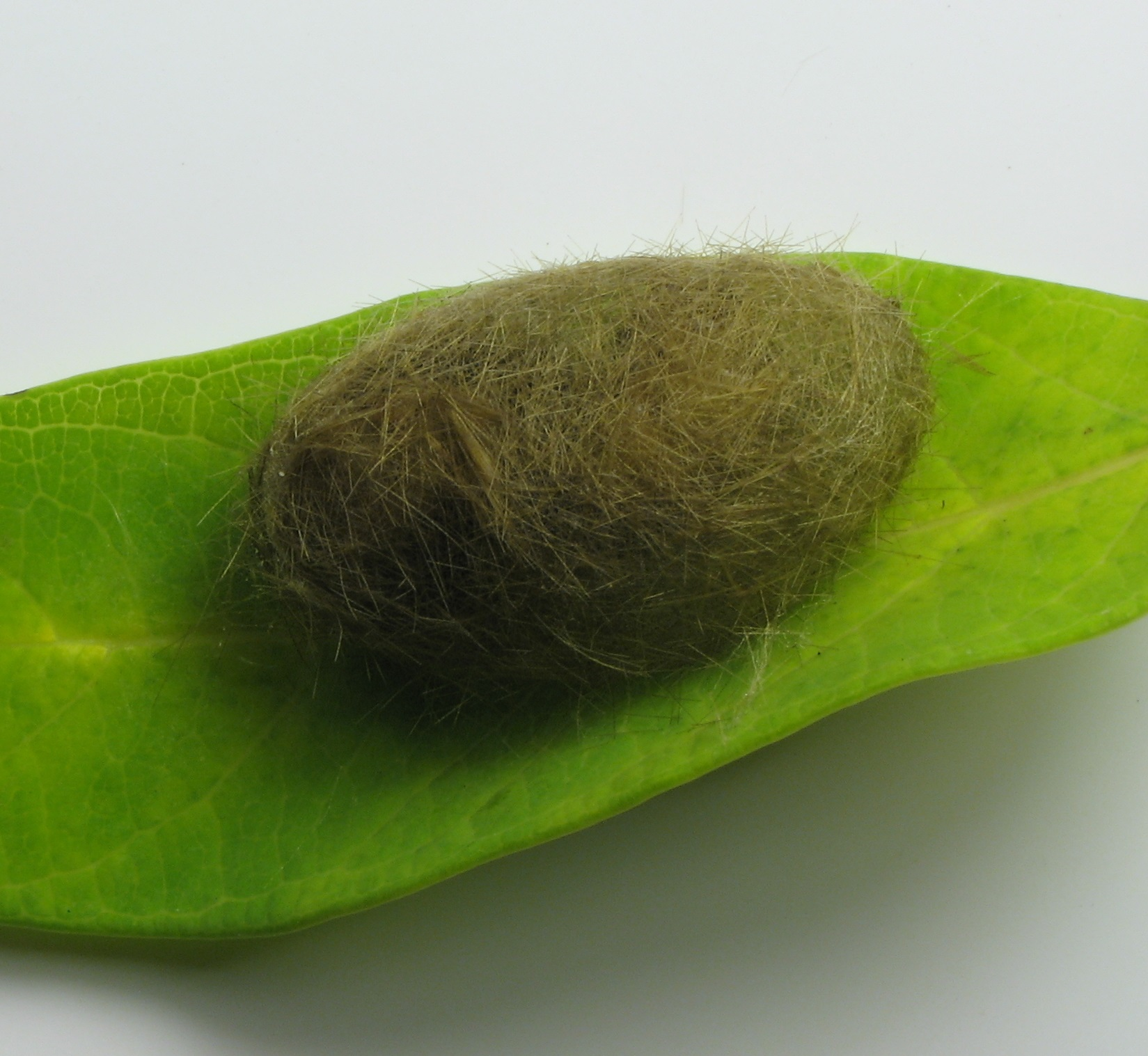
Halysidota tessellaris cocoon

The Arctiini are a tribe of tiger moths in the family Erebidae.

== Systematics ==
The tribe was previously treated as a higher-level taxon, the subfamily Arctiinae, within the lichen and tiger moth family, Arctiidae. The ranks of the family and its subdivisions were lowered in a recent reclassification while keeping the contents of the family and its subdivisions largely unchanged. These changes in rank triggered changes in the suffixes in the names. The subfamily Arctiinae as a whole was reclassified as the subfamily Arctiinae within the family Erebidae. The original subfamily Arctiinae was lowered to tribe status as Arctiini, and its original tribes were lowered to subtribe status by changing the -ini suffix to -ina (e.g., Callimorphini became Callimorphina). Thus, the name "Arctiinae" used to refer to only a subgroup of the entire group of lichen and tiger moths, but now it refers to the entire group.

== Subtribes (former tribes) ==
Many genera in the tribe have been classified into the following subtribes, while the others are incertae sedis.

- Arctiina
- Callimorphina
- Ctenuchina
- Euchromiina
- Micrarctiina
- Nyctemerina
- Pericopina
- Phaegopterina
- Spilosomina
- Incertae sedis

=== A note by Vladimir Viktorovitch Dubatolov ===
Generic composition of Arctiinae have been stated in main species catalogs of this subfamily: Nearctic (Ferguson & Opler, 2006), Neotropical (Watson & Goodger, 1986), Eurasia (Dubatolov & de Vos, 2010), Australia (Edwards, 1996), with additions and corrections by Dubatolov, Afrotropical (Goodger & Watson, 1995 with later additions and corrections by Dubatolov). Many problematic genera were placed in correct tribes or different subfamilies in these catalogs.

=== Some notable taxa ===
- Eupseudosoma involuta (Sepp, 1855)
- Halysidota leda (Druce, 1880)
  - Halysidota leda leda
  - Halysidota leda enricoi Toulgoët, 1978
- Halysidota schausi Rothschild, 1909
- Hypercompe icasia (Cramer, 1777)
- Opharus bimaculata (Dewitz, 1877)
- Pachydota albiceps (Walker, 1856)
- Pseudamastus alsa (Druce, 1890)
  - Pseudamastus alsa alsa
  - Pseudamastus alsa lalannei Toulgoët, 1985
- Utetheisa ornatrix (Linnaeus, 1758)
- Utetheisa pulchella (Linnaeus, 1758)
