= Disconeura =

Scientific classification
- Kingdom: Animalia
- Phylum: Arthropoda
- Class: Insecta
- Order: Lepidoptera
- Superfamily: Noctuoidea
- Family: Erebidae
- Subfamily: Arctiinae
- Subtribe: Phaegopterina
- Genus: Disconeura; Bryk, 1953

Genus of moths

Disconeura is a genus of moths in the family Erebidae. The genus was erected by Felix Bryk in 1953.

== Species ==
- Disconeura dissimilis
- Disconeura drucei
- Disconeura inexpectata
- Disconeura linaza
- Disconeura lutosa
- Disconeura peculiaris
- Disconeura soror

== Former species ==
- Disconeura tristriata
