= Disconeura lutosa =

Scientific classification
- Kingdom: Animalia
- Phylum: Arthropoda
- Clade: Pancrustacea
- Class: Insecta
- Order: Lepidoptera
- Superfamily: Noctuoidea
- Family: Erebidae
- Subfamily: Arctiinae
- Genus: Disconeura
- Species: D. lutosa

Binomial name
- Disconeura lutosa (Hübner, [1823])

Synonyms
- Empusa lutosa Hübner, [1823]; Automolis frater Rothschild, 1922

Species of moth

Disconeura lutosa is a moth of the family Erebidae first described by Jacob Hübner in 1823. It is found in Paraguay and Brazil.

== Subspecies ==
- Disconeura lutosa lutosa
- Disconeura lutosa frater (Rothschild, 1922) (Brazil)
