= Disconeura peculiaris =

Scientific classification
- Domain: Eukaryota
- Kingdom: Animalia
- Phylum: Arthropoda
- Class: Insecta
- Order: Lepidoptera
- Superfamily: Noctuoidea
- Family: Erebidae
- Subfamily: Arctiinae
- Genus: Disconeura
- Species: D. peculiaris

Binomial name
- Disconeura peculiaris (Rothschild, 1933)

Synonyms
- Automolis peculiaris Rothschild, 1933

Species of moth

Disconeura peculiaris is a moth of the family Erebidae first described by Walter Rothschild in 1933. It is found in Brazil.
