= Disconeura drucei =

Scientific classification
- Domain: Eukaryota
- Kingdom: Animalia
- Phylum: Arthropoda
- Class: Insecta
- Order: Lepidoptera
- Superfamily: Noctuoidea
- Family: Erebidae
- Subfamily: Arctiinae
- Genus: Disconeura
- Species: D. drucei

Binomial name
- Disconeura drucei (Rothschild, 1922)

Synonyms
- Automolis drucei Rothschild, 1922; Disconeura tristriata Bryk, 1953

Species of moth

Disconeura drucei is a moth of the family Erebidae first described by Walter Rothschild in 1922. It is found in Peru.
