= Disconeura inexpectata =

Scientific classification
- Domain: Eukaryota
- Kingdom: Animalia
- Phylum: Arthropoda
- Class: Insecta
- Order: Lepidoptera
- Superfamily: Noctuoidea
- Family: Erebidae
- Subfamily: Arctiinae
- Genus: Disconeura
- Species: D. inexpectata

Binomial name
- Disconeura inexpectata (Rothschild, 1910)

Synonyms
- Halisidota inexpectata Rothschild, 1910

Species of moth

Disconeura inexpectata is a moth of the family Erebidae first described by Walter Rothschild in 1910. It is found in Peru.
