= Disconeura soror =

Scientific classification
- Domain: Eukaryota
- Kingdom: Animalia
- Phylum: Arthropoda
- Class: Insecta
- Order: Lepidoptera
- Superfamily: Noctuoidea
- Family: Erebidae
- Subfamily: Arctiinae
- Genus: Disconeura
- Species: D. soror

Binomial name
- Disconeura soror (Rothschild, 1917)

Synonyms
- Automolis soror Rothschild, 1917

Species of moth

Disconeura soror is a moth of the family Erebidae first described by Walter Rothschild in 1917. It is found in Brazil.
