= Disconeura linaza =

Scientific classification
- Domain: Eukaryota
- Kingdom: Animalia
- Phylum: Arthropoda
- Class: Insecta
- Order: Lepidoptera
- Superfamily: Noctuoidea
- Family: Erebidae
- Subfamily: Arctiinae
- Genus: Disconeura
- Species: D. linaza

Binomial name
- Disconeura linaza (Dognin, 1898)

Synonyms
- Idalus linaza Dognin, 1898

Species of moth

Disconeura linaza is a moth of the family Erebidae first described by Paul Dognin in 1898. It is found in Paraguay.
