= List of moths of South Africa (Tortricidae) =

This is a list of moths of the family Tortricidae that are found in South Africa. It also acts as an index to the species articles and forms part of the full List of moths of South Africa.

- Acanthoclita phaulomorpha (Meyrick, 1927)
- Acleris rubi Razowski, 2005
- Afroploce karsholti Aarvik, 2004
- Afroploce mabalingwae Razowski, 2008
- Algoforma algoana (Felder & Rogenhofer, 1875)
- Algoforma paralgoana Razowski, 2005
- Ancylis argenticiliana Walsingham, 1897
- Ancylis falsicoma Meyrick, 1914
- Ancylis halisparta Meyrick, 1909
- Ancylis natalana (Walsingham, 1881)
- Anthozela chrysoxantha Meyrick, 1813
- Aphelia corroborata (Meyrick, 1918)
- Aphelia finita (Meyrick, 1924)
- Apotoforma uncifera Razowski, 1964
- Bactra adelpha Diakonoff, 1963
- Bactra bactrana (Kennel, 1901)
- Bactra confusa Diakonoff, 1963
- Bactra dolia Diakonoff, 1963
- Bactra fasciata Diakonoff, 1963
- Bactra jansei Diakonoff, 1963
- Bactra legitima Meyrick, 1911
- Bactra punctistrigana Mabille, 1900
- Bactra pythonia Meyrick, 1909
- Bactra rhabdonoma Diakonoff, 1963
- Bactra salpictris Diakonoff, 1963
- Bactra sardonia (Meyrick, 1908)
- Bactra scrupulosa Meyrick, 1911
- Bactra sinassula Diakonoff, 1963
- Bactra sordidata Diakonoff, 1963
- Bactra spinosa Diakonoff, 1963
- Bactra stagnicolana Zeller, 1852
- Bactra tradens Diakonoff, 1963
- Bactra trimera Diakonoff, 1963
- Bactra tylophora Diakonoff, 1963
- Bactra verutana Zeller, 1876
- Brachiolia egenella (Walker, 1864)
- Brachiolia obscurana Razowski, 1966
- Brachioxena lutrocopa (Meyrick, 1914)
- Brachioxena psammacta (Meyrick, 1908)
- Bubonoxena ephippias (Meyrick, 1907)
- Cacoecimorpha pronubana (Hübner, 1799)
- Camptrodoxa inclyta Meyrick, 1925
- Catamacta scrutatrix Meyrick, 1912
- Celypha sistrata (Meyrick, 1911)
- Choristoneura heliaspis (Meyrick, 1909)
- Choristoneura psoricodes (Meyrick, 1911)
- Clepsis monochroa Razowski, 2006
- Cnephasia captiva Meyrick, 1911
- Cnephasia catastrepta Meyrick, 1926
- Cnephasia chlorocrossa Meyrick, 1926
- Cnephasia ergastularis Meyrick, 1911
- Cnephasia flavisecta Meyrick, 1918
- Cnephasia macrostoma Meyrick, 1920
- Cnephasia opsarias Meyrick, 1911
- Cnephasia pachydesma Meyrick, 1918
- Cnephasia phalarocosma Meyrick, 1937
- Cnephasia tigrina (Walsingham, 1891)
- Coccothera areata (Meyrick, 1918)
- Coccothera spissana (Zeller, 1852)
- Coccothera victrix (Meyrick, 1918)
- Coniostola calculosa (Meyrick, 1913)
- Coniostola symbola (Meyrick, 1909)
- Cosmetra spiculifera (Meyrick, 1913)
- Cosmorrhyncha microcosma Aarvik, 2004
- Crocidosema plebejana Zeller, 1847
- Crocidosema thematica (Meyrick, 1918)
- Cryptaspasma caryothicta (Meyrick, 1920)
- Cryptaspasma querula (Meyrick, 1912)
- Cryptophlebia peltastica (Meyrick, 1921)
- Cryptophlebia rhizophorae Vári, 1981
- Cryptophlebia semilunana (Saalmüller, 1880)
- Cydia anthracotis (Meyrick, 1913)
- Cydia campestris (Meyrick, 1914)
- Cydia choleropa (Meyrick, 1913)
- Cydia cyanocephala (Meyrick, 1921)
- Cydia euclera (Meyrick, 1921)
- Cydia excoriata (Meyrick, 1918)
- Cydia leptogramma (Meyrick, 1913)
- Cydia malacodes (Meyrick, 1911)
- Cydia modica (Meyrick, 1913)
- Cydia ocnogramma (Meyrick, 1910)
- Cydia pomonella (Linnaeus, 1758)
- Cydia tumulata Meyrick, 1908
- Cydia violescens (Meyrick, 1918)
- Dichrorampha embolaea (Meyrick, 1918)
- Doliochastis homograpta Meyrick, 1920
- Droceta cedrota (Meyrick, 1908)
- Eccopsis incultana (Walker, 1863)
- Eccopsis nebulana Walsingham, 1891
- Eccopsis ofcolacona Razowski, 2008
- Eccopsis praecedens Walsingham, 1897
- Eccopsis ptilonota (Meyrick, 1921)
- Eccopsis wahlbergiana Zeller, 1852
- Epiblema leucopetra (Meyrick, 1908)
- Epiblema riciniata (Meyrick, 1911)
- Epichorista cinerata Meyrick, 1920
- Epichorista exanimata Meyrick, 1920
- Epichorista niphosema Meyrick, 1917
- Epichorista perversa Meyrick, 1912
- Epichorista phalaraea Meyrick, 1920
- Epichorista vestigialis Meyrick, 1914
- Epichoristodes acerbella (Walker, 1864)
- Epichoristodes spinulosa (Meyrick, 1924)
- Epinotia infausta (Walsingham, 1881)
- Eucosma accipitrina Meyrick, 1913
- Eucosma actuosa Meyrick, 1913
- Eucosma amara Meyrick, 1913
- Eucosma calliarma Meyrick, 1909
- Eucosma chloroterma Meyrick, 1913
- Eucosma clarifica Meyrick, 1913
- Eucosma drastica Meyrick, 1918
- Eucosma galactitis Meyrick, 1912
- Eucosma glyphicodes Meyrick, 1918
- Eucosma inscita Meyrick, 1913
- Eucosma insolens Meyrick, 1909
- Eucosma lochmaea Meyrick, 1920
- Eucosma marmara Meyrick, 1909
- Eucosma nasuta Meyrick, 1911
- Eucosma niphaspis Meyrick, 1928
- Eucosma passiva Meyrick, 1913
- Eucosma projecta Meyrick, 1921
- Eucosma salticola Meyrick, 1913
- Eucosma siccescens Meyrick, 1912
- Eucosma sollennis Meyrick, 1913
- Eucosma tenax Meyrick, 1920
- Eucosma thalameuta Meyrick, 1918
- Eucosma tremula Meyrick, 1909
- Eucosmocydia monitrix (Meyrick, 1909)
- Eugnosta anxifera Razowski, 1993
- Eugnosta assecula (Meyrick, 1909)
- Eugnosta feriata (Meyrick, 1913)
- Eugnosta heteroclita Razowski, 1993
- Eugnosta lukaszi Razowski, 2005
- Eugnosta misella Razowski, 1993
- Eugnosta niveicaput Razowski, 2005
- Eugnosta parmisella Razowski, 2005
- Eugnosta replicata (Meyrick, 1913)
- Eugnosta stigmatica (Meyrick, 1909)
- Eugnosta trimeni (Felder & Rogenhofer, 1875)
- Eugnosta umbraculata (Meyrick, 1918)
- Eugnosta vecorda Razowski, 1993
- Eugnosta xanthochroma Razowski, 1993
- Eupoecilia kruegeriana Razowski, 1993
- Fulcrifera aphrospila (Meyrick, 1921)
- Fulcrifera deltozyga (Meyrick, 1928)
- Fulcrifera halmyris (Meyrick, 1909)
- Fulcrifera periculosa (Meyrick, 1913)
- Fulcrifera psamminitis (Meyrick, 1913)
- Fulcrifera tricentra (Meyrick, 1907)
- Goniotorna pleuroptila (Meyrick, 1937)
- Grapholita delineana Walker, 1863
- Grapholita molesta (Busck, 1916)
- Gypsonoma opsonoma (Meyrick, 1918)
- Gypsonoma paradelta (Meyrick, 1925)
- Gypsonoma scenica (Meyrick, 1911)
- Hectaphelia hectaea (Meyrick, 1911)
- Hectaphelia kapakoana Razowski, 2006
- Hectaphelia metapyrrha (Meyrick, 1918)
- Hectaphelia periculosa Razowski, 2006
- Hectaphelia pharetrata (Meyrick, 1909)
- Hectaphelia tortuosa (Meyrick, 1912)
- Lobesia aeolopa Meyrick, 1907
- Lobesia harmonia (Meyrick, 1908)
- Lobesia metachlora (Meyrick, 1913)
- Lobesia primaria (Meyrick, 1909)
- Lobesia quadratica (Meyrick, 1911)
- Lobesia scorpiodes (Meyrick, 1908)
- Lobesia stenaspis (Meyrick, 1921)
- Lobesia stericta (Meyrick, 1911)
- Lozotaenia capensana (Walker, 1863)
- Lozotaenia capitana Felder & Rogenhofer, 1875
- Matsumuraeses melanaula (Meyrick, 1916)
- Megalota lobotona (Meyrick, 1921)
- Megalota sponditis (Meyrick, 1918)
- Metamesia designata (Meyrick, 1921)
- Metamesia elegans (Walsingham, 1881)
- Metamesia incepta (Meyrick, 1912)
- Metamesia intensa (Meyrick, 1921)
- Nkandla flavisecta (Razowski, J. & J.W. Brown, 2009)
- Olethreutes arsiptera (Meyrick, 1921)
- Olethreutes asterota (Meyrick, 1918)
- Olethreutes brevibasana (Walsingham, 1891)
- Olethreutes carceraria (Meyrick, 1913)
- Olethreutes caryocoma (Meyrick, 1918)
- Olethreutes criopis (Meyrick, 1928)
- Olethreutes diremptana (Walker, 1863)
- Olethreutes encharacta (Meyrick, 1918)
- Olethreutes erythropa (Meyrick, 1918)
- Olethreutes glaphyraspis (Meyrick, 1921)
- Olethreutes globigera (Meyrick, 1914)
- Olethreutes nectarodes (Meyrick, 1921)
- Olethreutes orichlora (Meyrick, 1920)
- Olethreutes orthacta (Meyrick, 1908)
- Olethreutes propitia (Meyrick, 1918)
- Olethreutes sagata (Meyrick, 1913)
- Olethreutes scabellana (Zeller, 1852)
- Orilesa olearis (Meyrick, 1912)
- Paraeccopsis acroplecta (Meyrick, 1921)
- Paraeccopsis exhilarata (Meyrick, 1918)
- Paraeccopsis nucleata (Meyrick, 1913)
- Paraeccopsis phoeniodes (Meyrick, 1921)
- Paraeccopsis windhoeca Razowski, 2008
- Paramesiodes albescens (Meyrick, 1912)
- Paramesiodes chloradelpha (Meyrick, 1912)
- Paramesiodes geraeas (Meyrick, 1909)
- Paramesiodes temulenta (Meyrick, 1912)
- Phlebozemia sandrinae Diakonoff, 1985
- Phtheochroa natalica Razowski, 2005
- Procrica mariepskopa Razowski, 2008
- Procrica pilgrima Razowski, 2008
- Promodra nigrata Razowski, 2008
- Promodra prodroma (Meyrick, 1913)
- Pseudeboda africana Razowski, 1964
- Rufeccopsis rufescens (Meyrick, 1913)
- Spilonota sinuosa Meyrick, 1917
- Stenentoma bisecta (Meyrick, 1918)
- Strepsicrates rhothia (Meyrick, 1910)
- Syndemis saburrana Zeller, 1852
- Tetramoera isogramma (Meyrick, 1908)
- Thaumatotibia batrachopa (Meyrick, 1908)
- Thaumatotibia leucotreta (Meyrick, 1913)
- Thaumatotibia macrops (Diakonoff, 1959)
- Tortrix agroeca Meyrick, 1908
- Tortrix biformis Meyrick, 1920
- Tortrix crispata Meyrick, 1912
- Tortrix diluticiliana (Walsingham, 1881)
- Tortrix furtiva Meyrick, 1911
- Tortrix mensaria Meyrick, 1912
- Tortrix myroxesta Meyrick, 1924
- Tortrix polytechna Meyrick, 1924
- Tortrix spilographa Meyrick, 1937
- Tortrix sporadias Meyrick, 1920
- Tortrix symplecta Meyrick, 1910
- Trymalitis scalifera Meyrick, 1912
- Tuckia africana (Walsingham, 1881)
- Tuckia zuluana Razowski, 2001
- Worcesteria recondita Razowski, 2006
- Xenosocia conica (Meyrick, 1911)
- Xenosocia desipiens (Meyrick, 1918)
- Xenosocia paracremna (Meyrick, 1913)
- Zellereccopsis caffreana Razowski, 2008
