= Zauclophora =

Scientific classification
- Domain: Eukaryota
- Kingdom: Animalia
- Phylum: Arthropoda
- Class: Insecta
- Order: Lepidoptera
- Family: Xyloryctidae
- Genus: Zauclophora; Turner, 1900

Synonyms
- Zanclophora T. B. Fletcher, 1929

Moth genus in family Xyloryctidae

Zauclophora is a genus of moths of the family Xyloryctidae described by Alfred Jefferis Turner in 1900.

== Species ==
- Zauclophora muscerdella (Zeller, 1873)
- Zauclophora pelodes Turner, 1900
- Zauclophora procellosa (Lucas, 1901)

== Former species ==
- Zauclophora albulella (Walker, 1864)
- Zauclophora metaphaeella (Walker, 1863)
