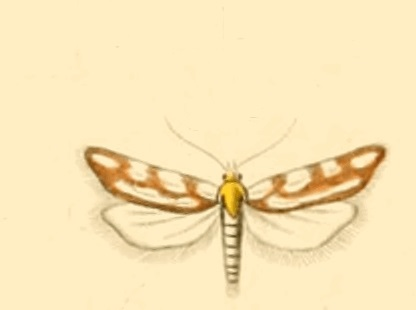

Scientific classification
- Domain: Eukaryota
- Kingdom: Animalia
- Phylum: Arthropoda
- Class: Insecta
- Order: Lepidoptera
- Family: Tortricidae
- Genus: Eugnosta
- Species: E. parreyssiana

Binomial name
- Eugnosta parreyssiana (Duponchel, in Godart, 1842)

Synonyms
- Argyroptera parreyssiana Duponchel, in Godart, 1842

= Eugnosta parreyssiana =

Species of moth

Eugnosta parreyssiana is a species of moth of the family Tortricidae. It is found in France, Germany, Austria, Switzerland, the Czech Republic, Slovakia, Romania and Russia.

The larvae possibly feed on Jurinea cyanoides.

== Taxonomy ==
The species was treated as a synonym or subspecies of Eugnosta hydrargyrana, but was given species rank by Nedoshivina in 2007.
