= Nkandla =

Nkandla is a South African place name that may refer to:

- Nkandla, KwaZulu-Natal, a town
- Nkandla Local Municipality, the local authority that includes the town and surrounds
- Nkandla homestead, the homestead of President Jacob Zuma
- Nkandla (moth), a genus of moths in the family Tortricidae
