= Goniotorna mianta =

Scientific classification
- Domain: Eukaryota
- Kingdom: Animalia
- Phylum: Arthropoda
- Class: Insecta
- Order: Lepidoptera
- Family: Tortricidae
- Genus: Goniotorna
- Species: G. mianta

Binomial name
- Goniotorna mianta Diakonoff, 1973

Species of moth

Goniotorna mianta is a species of moth of the family Tortricidae. It is found in Madagascar.
