= Eugnosta acanthana =

Scientific classification
- Kingdom: Animalia
- Phylum: Arthropoda
- Clade: Pancrustacea
- Class: Insecta
- Order: Lepidoptera
- Family: Tortricidae
- Genus: Eugnosta
- Species: E. acanthana

Binomial name
- Eugnosta acanthana Razowski, 1967

Species of moth

Eugnosta acanthana is a species of moth of the family Tortricidae. It was first described by Józef Razowski in 1967, and is found in north-eastern Afghanistan.
