= Eugnosta aguila =

Scientific classification
- Kingdom: Animalia
- Phylum: Arthropoda
- Clade: Pancrustacea
- Class: Insecta
- Order: Lepidoptera
- Family: Tortricidae
- Genus: Eugnosta
- Species: E. aguila

Binomial name
- Eugnosta aguila (Razowski & Becker, 1986)

Synonyms
- Carolella aguila Razowski & Becker, 1986

Species of moth

Eugnosta aguila is a species of moth of the family Tortricidae. It is found in Mexico (Veracruz).
