= Eugnosta brownana =

Scientific classification
- Domain: Eukaryota
- Kingdom: Animalia
- Phylum: Arthropoda
- Class: Insecta
- Order: Lepidoptera
- Family: Tortricidae
- Genus: Eugnosta
- Species: E. brownana

Binomial name
- Eugnosta brownana Metzler & Forbes, 2012

Species of moth

Eugnosta brownana is a species of moth of the family Tortricidae. It is found in Texas, New Mexico, Arizona and possibly Mexico.

The length of the forewings is 4.2–7.1 mm for males and 4.6–7.1 mm for females.

== Etymology ==
The species is named for John W. Brown.
