= Eugnosta ussuriana =

Scientific classification
- Domain: Eukaryota
- Kingdom: Animalia
- Phylum: Arthropoda
- Class: Insecta
- Order: Lepidoptera
- Family: Tortricidae
- Genus: Eugnosta
- Species: E. ussuriana

Binomial name
- Eugnosta ussuriana (Caradja, 1926)

Synonyms
- Phtheochroa ussuriana Caradja, 1926; Euxanthis cosmolitha Meyrick, 1931

Species of moth

Eugnosta ussuriana is a species of moth of the family Tortricidae. It is found in the Russian Far East (Amur) and Japan (Hokkaido and Honshu). It has also been recorded from China.

The wingspan is about 20 mm.
