= Eugnosta sebasta =

Scientific classification
- Kingdom: Animalia
- Phylum: Arthropoda
- Class: Insecta
- Order: Lepidoptera
- Family: Tortricidae
- Genus: Eugnosta
- Species: E. sebasta

Binomial name
- Eugnosta sebasta Razowski, 1994

Species of moth

Eugnosta sebasta is a species of moth of the family Tortricidae. It is found in Mexico (Baja California Norte).
