= Eugnosta argentinae =

Scientific classification
- Kingdom: Animalia
- Phylum: Arthropoda
- Class: Insecta
- Order: Lepidoptera
- Family: Tortricidae
- Genus: Eugnosta
- Species: E. argentinae

Binomial name
- Eugnosta argentinae (Razowski, 1967)

Synonyms
- Carolella argentinae Razowski, 1967

Species of moth

Eugnosta argentinae is a species of moth of the family Tortricidae. It is found in Argentina.
