= Eugnosta umtamvuna =

Scientific classification
- Kingdom: Animalia
- Phylum: Arthropoda
- Class: Insecta
- Order: Lepidoptera
- Family: Tortricidae
- Genus: Eugnosta
- Species: E. umtamvuna

Binomial name
- Eugnosta umtamvuna Razowski, 2015

Species of moth

Eugnosta umtamvuna is a species of moth of the family Tortricidae. It is found in South Africa.

The wingspan is about 10 mm.

== Etymology ==
The specific name refers to Umtamvuna Nature Reserve, the type locality.
