= Eugnosta pamirana =

Scientific classification
- Domain: Eukaryota
- Kingdom: Animalia
- Phylum: Arthropoda
- Class: Insecta
- Order: Lepidoptera
- Family: Tortricidae
- Genus: Eugnosta
- Species: E. pamirana

Binomial name
- Eugnosta pamirana Obraztsov, 1943

Species of moth

Eugnosta pamirana is a species of moth of the family Tortricidae. It is found in Tajikistan and Afghanistan.
