= Eugnosta molybdanthes =

Scientific classification
- Kingdom: Animalia
- Phylum: Arthropoda
- Class: Insecta
- Order: Lepidoptera
- Family: Tortricidae
- Genus: Eugnosta
- Species: E. molybdanthes

Binomial name
- Eugnosta molybdanthes (Meyrick, 1932)

Synonyms
- Phtheochroa molybdanthes Meyrick, 1932

Species of moth

Eugnosta molybdanthes is a species of moth of the family Tortricidae. It is found in Brazil (Santa Catarina).
