= Eugnosta chionochlaena =

Scientific classification
- Kingdom: Animalia
- Phylum: Arthropoda
- Class: Insecta
- Order: Lepidoptera
- Family: Tortricidae
- Genus: Eugnosta
- Species: E. chionochlaena

Binomial name
- Eugnosta chionochlaena (Meyrick, 1932)

Synonyms
- Trachybyrsis chionochlaena Meyrick, 1932

Species of moth

Eugnosta chionochlaena is a species of moth of the family Tortricidae. It is found in Ethiopia.
