= Promodra =

Scientific classification
- Kingdom: Animalia
- Phylum: Arthropoda
- Clade: Pancrustacea
- Class: Insecta
- Order: Lepidoptera
- Family: Tortricidae
- Subfamily: Olethreutinae
- Tribe: Olethreutini
- Genus: Promodra; Razowski, 2008

Species
- Promodra nigrata; Promodra prodroma

Genus of moths

Promodra is a genus of moths in the family Tortricidae.
