= Eugnosta hysterosiana =

Scientific classification
- Kingdom: Animalia
- Phylum: Arthropoda
- Class: Insecta
- Order: Lepidoptera
- Family: Tortricidae
- Genus: Eugnosta
- Species: E. hysterosiana

Binomial name
- Eugnosta hysterosiana (Razowski, 1967)

Synonyms
- Carolella hysterosiana Razowski, 1967

Species of moth

Eugnosta hysterosiana is a species of moth of the family Tortricidae. It is found in Argentina.
