= Eugnosta mexicana =

Scientific classification
- Domain: Eukaryota
- Kingdom: Animalia
- Phylum: Arthropoda
- Class: Insecta
- Order: Lepidoptera
- Family: Tortricidae
- Genus: Eugnosta
- Species: E. mexicana

Binomial name
- Eugnosta mexicana (Busck, 1907)

Synonyms
- Pharmacis mexicana Busck, 1907

Species of moth

Eugnosta mexicana is a species of moth of the family Tortricidae. It is found in North America, where it has been recorded from Arizona, Colorado, New Mexico and Utah.

The wingspan is 17–20 mm. Adults have been recorded on wing from June to August.
