= Metamesia =

Scientific classification
- Domain: Eukaryota
- Kingdom: Animalia
- Phylum: Arthropoda
- Class: Insecta
- Order: Lepidoptera
- Family: Tortricidae
- Tribe: Archipini
- Genus: Metamesia; Diakonoff, 1960

Genus of tortrix moths

Metamesia is a genus of moths belonging to the subfamily Tortricinae of the family Tortricidae.

== Species ==
- Metamesia ametria Diakonoff, 1960
- Metamesia catadryas (Meyrick, 1937)
- Metamesia designata (Meyrick, 1921)
- Metamesia dilucida Diakonoff, 1960
- Metamesia elegans (Walsingham, 1881)
- Metamesia endopyrrha (Meyrick, 1930)
- Metamesia episema Diakonoff, 1960
- Metamesia incepta (Meyrick, 1912)
- Metamesia intensa (Meyrick, 1921)
- Metamesia leptodelta Diakonoff, 1973
- Metamesia leucomitra Diakonoff, 1960
- Metamesia leucophyes Diakonoff, 1960
- Metamesia metacroca Diakonoff, 1960
- Metamesia nolens Diakonoff, 1960
- Metamesia peracuta Diakonoff, 1960
- Metamesia physetopa (Meyrick, 1932)
- Metamesia ptychophora Diakonoff, 1960
- Metamesia retrocitra Diakonoff, 1960
- Metamesia synclysa Diakonoff, 1973

== Former species ==
- Metamesia octogona Bradley, 1965

== See also ==
- List of Tortricidae genera
