= Eugnosta argyroplaca =

Scientific classification
- Kingdom: Animalia
- Phylum: Arthropoda
- Class: Insecta
- Order: Lepidoptera
- Family: Tortricidae
- Genus: Eugnosta
- Species: E. argyroplaca

Binomial name
- Eugnosta argyroplaca (Meyrick, 1931)

Synonyms
- Euxanthis argyroplaca Meyrick, 1931; Carolella argyroplaca

Species of moth

Eugnosta argyroplaca is a species of moth of the family Tortricidae. It is found in Arizona.
