= Eugnosta asthenia =

Scientific classification
- Kingdom: Animalia
- Phylum: Arthropoda
- Class: Insecta
- Order: Lepidoptera
- Family: Tortricidae
- Genus: Eugnosta
- Species: E. asthenia

Binomial name
- Eugnosta asthenia (Clarke, 1968)

Synonyms
- Carolella asthenia Clarke, 1968

Species of moth

Eugnosta asthenia is a species of moth of the family Tortricidae. It is found in Guatemala.
