= Zauclophora procellosa =

Scientific classification
- Domain: Eukaryota
- Kingdom: Animalia
- Phylum: Arthropoda
- Class: Insecta
- Order: Lepidoptera
- Family: Xyloryctidae
- Genus: Zauclophora
- Species: Z. procellosa

Binomial name
- Zauclophora procellosa (T. P. Lucas, 1901)

Synonyms
- Clerarcha procellosa T. P. Lucas, 1901

Species of moth

Zauclophora procellosa is a moth in the family Xyloryctidae. It was described by Thomas Pennington Lucas in 1901. It is found in Australia, where it has been recorded from Queensland.

The wingspan is 20–28 mm. The forewings are light ochreous freely dusted and marked with ferrous diffusions, and ferruginous scales deeper ferrous at their apex, and becoming almost black on the hindmargin. There is a fine ferruginous line on the costa and a subcostal band of ground colour divides this from a band of ferruginous which runs parallel from the base to two-thirds of the wing, and then turns inward to form a suffused cloud, with a like median band, originating from itself near the base and enclosing an area of ground colour. At four-fifths of the costa, a cloudy fascia of ferruginous extends more or less diffusedly around the margin of the wing to the anal angle and a more diffused cloud of the same colour runs along the whole length of the inner margin, but shows more of ground colour, and with the median band encloses a strip of ground colour. A dark ferruginous spot is found in the disc, and second smaller one just beyond. A costal, apical and hindmarginal interrupted line of dark spots and lines bound a patch of ground colour continuous with the subcostal, and encloses a short transverse ferruginous fascia which commingles with the median fascia. The hindwings are smoky fuscous, shaded to ochreous toward the base.
