= Eugnosta macneilli =

Scientific classification
- Kingdom: Animalia
- Phylum: Arthropoda
- Class: Insecta
- Order: Lepidoptera
- Family: Tortricidae
- Genus: Eugnosta
- Species: E. macneilli

Binomial name
- Eugnosta macneilli (Razowski, 1986)

Synonyms
- Carolella macneilli Razowski, 1986; Eugnosta macneili Razowski, 2000

Species of moth

Eugnosta macneilli is a species of moth of the family Tortricidae. It is found in Durango, Mexico.
