= Paramesiodes aprepta =

Scientific classification
- Domain: Eukaryota
- Kingdom: Animalia
- Phylum: Arthropoda
- Class: Insecta
- Order: Lepidoptera
- Family: Tortricidae
- Genus: Paramesiodes
- Species: P. aprepta

Binomial name
- Paramesiodes aprepta Bradley, 1965

Species of moth

Paramesiodes aprepta is a species of moth of the family Tortricidae. It is found in Uganda.
