= Eugnosta fenestrana =

Scientific classification
- Kingdom: Animalia
- Phylum: Arthropoda
- Class: Insecta
- Order: Lepidoptera
- Family: Tortricidae
- Genus: Eugnosta
- Species: E. fenestrana

Binomial name
- Eugnosta fenestrana Razowski, 1964

Species of moth

Eugnosta fenestrana is a species of moth of the family Tortricidae. It is found in China (Beijing, Jilin, Qinghai), Mongolia and Russia.
