= Metamesia leucophyes =

Scientific classification
- Domain: Eukaryota
- Kingdom: Animalia
- Phylum: Arthropoda
- Class: Insecta
- Order: Lepidoptera
- Family: Tortricidae
- Genus: Metamesia
- Species: M. leucophyes

Binomial name
- Metamesia leucophyes Diakonoff, 1960

Species of moth

Metamesia leucophyes is a species of moth of the family Tortricidae. It is found on Madagascar.
