= Zauclophora pelodes =

Scientific classification
- Domain: Eukaryota
- Kingdom: Animalia
- Phylum: Arthropoda
- Class: Insecta
- Order: Lepidoptera
- Family: Xyloryctidae
- Genus: Zauclophora
- Species: Z. pelodes

Binomial name
- Zauclophora pelodes Turner, 1900

Synonyms
- Xylorycta cirrhodes Turner, 1904

Species of moth

Zauclophora pelodes is a moth in the family Xyloryctidae. It was described by Alfred Jefferis Turner in 1900. It is found in Australia, where it has been recorded from New South Wales and Queensland.

The wingspan is about 23 mm. The forewings are ochreous-brown, with ill-defined ochreous-whitish markings. There is an ochreous-whitish suffusion in the disc and an outwardly curved line from the costa at two-thirds to the anal angle, as well as two ochreous-whitish spots at and before the apex, separated by a fuscous spot. The hindmargin and anal angle are irrorated by fuscous scales. The hindwings are fuscous, towards the base suffused with ochreous.
