= Eugnosta euglypta =

Scientific classification
- Kingdom: Animalia
- Phylum: Arthropoda
- Class: Insecta
- Order: Lepidoptera
- Family: Tortricidae
- Genus: Eugnosta
- Species: E. euglypta

Binomial name
- Eugnosta euglypta (Meyrick, 1927)

Synonyms
- Trachybyrsis euglypta Meyrick, 1927

Species of moth

Eugnosta euglypta is a species of moth of the family Tortricidae. It is found in Rwanda and Uganda.
