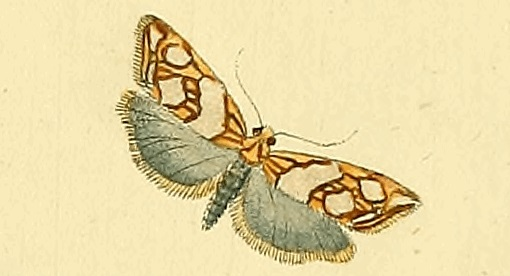

Scientific classification
- Kingdom: Animalia
- Phylum: Arthropoda
- Clade: Pancrustacea
- Class: Insecta
- Order: Lepidoptera
- Family: Tortricidae
- Genus: Eugnosta
- Species: E. lathoniana

Binomial name
- Eugnosta lathoniana (Hubner, [1799-1800])

Synonyms
- Tortrix lathoniana Hubner, [1799-1800]

= Eugnosta lathoniana =

Species of moth

Eugnosta lathoniana is a species of moth of the family Tortricidae. It is found in southern Europe (from the Iberian Peninsula to the Peloponnese and from Germany to the Ural Mountains and the Caucasus), North Africa (Algeria), Asia Minor, Armenia and Iran.

The wingspan is 21–27 mm. Adults are on wing from May to June.
