= Eugnosta multifasciana =

Scientific classification
- Domain: Eukaryota
- Kingdom: Animalia
- Phylum: Arthropoda
- Class: Insecta
- Order: Lepidoptera
- Family: Tortricidae
- Genus: Eugnosta
- Species: E. multifasciana

Binomial name
- Eugnosta multifasciana (Kennel, 1899)

Synonyms
- Cochylis multifasciana Kennel, 1899

Species of moth

Eugnosta multifasciana is a species of moth of the family Tortricidae. It is found in Central Asia (Alai Mountains and Turkestan).
