= Orilesa caminosa =

Scientific classification
- Kingdom: Animalia
- Phylum: Arthropoda
- Class: Insecta
- Order: Lepidoptera
- Family: Tortricidae
- Genus: Orilesa
- Species: O. caminosa

Binomial name
- Orilesa caminosa Razowski, 2012

Species of moth

Orilesa caminosa is a species of moth of the family Tortricidae. It is found in the Democratic Republic of Congo (Équateur) and Ethiopia.
