= Goniotorna irresoluta =

Scientific classification
- Domain: Eukaryota
- Kingdom: Animalia
- Phylum: Arthropoda
- Class: Insecta
- Order: Lepidoptera
- Family: Tortricidae
- Genus: Goniotorna
- Species: G. irresoluta

Binomial name
- Goniotorna irresoluta Diakonoff, 1960

Species of moth

Goniotorna irresoluta is a species of moth of the family Tortricidae. It is found in Madagascar.

== Subspecies ==
- Goniotorna irresoluta irresoluta (eastern Madagascar)
- Goniotorna irresoluta taeniata Diakonoff, 1960 (north-eastern Madagascar)
