= Eugnosta percnoptila =

Scientific classification
- Kingdom: Animalia
- Phylum: Arthropoda
- Class: Insecta
- Order: Lepidoptera
- Family: Tortricidae
- Genus: Eugnosta
- Species: E. percnoptila

Binomial name
- Eugnosta percnoptila (Meyrick, 1933)

Synonyms
- Phtheochroa percnoptila Meyrick, 1933

Species of moth

Eugnosta percnoptila is a species of moth of the family Tortricidae. It is found in the Democratic Republic of Congo, Kenya and Tanzania.

The wingspan is 14–18 mm.
