= Zauclophora muscerdella =

Scientific classification
- Kingdom: Animalia
- Phylum: Arthropoda
- Clade: Pancrustacea
- Class: Insecta
- Order: Lepidoptera
- Family: Xyloryctidae
- Genus: Zauclophora
- Species: Z. muscerdella

Binomial name
- Zauclophora muscerdella (Zeller, 1873)

Synonyms
- Cryptolechia muscerdella Zeller, 1873

Species of moth

Zauclophora muscerdella is a moth in the family Xyloryctidae. It was described by Philipp Christoph Zeller in 1873. It is found in Venezuela.
