= Droceta =

Scientific classification
- Kingdom: Animalia
- Phylum: Arthropoda
- Class: Insecta
- Order: Lepidoptera
- Family: Tortricidae
- Tribe: Archipini
- Genus: Droceta; Razowski, 2006

Genus of tortrix moths

Droceta is a genus of moths of the family Tortricidae.

== Species ==
- Droceta cedrota (Meyrick, 1908)

== Etymology ==
The generic name is an anagram of the name of the type-species.

== See also ==
- List of Tortricidae genera
