= Eugnosta unifasciana =

Scientific classification
- Kingdom: Animalia
- Phylum: Arthropoda
- Class: Insecta
- Order: Lepidoptera
- Family: Tortricidae
- Genus: Eugnosta
- Species: E. unifasciana

Binomial name
- Eugnosta unifasciana Aarvik, 2010

Species of moth

Eugnosta unifasciana is a species of moth of the family Tortricidae. It is found in Tanzania. The habitat consists of a mosaic of Brachystegia-forest and semi-evergreen coastal forest.

The wingspan is 11–14 mm.
