= Eugnosta ensinoana =

Scientific classification
- Kingdom: Animalia
- Phylum: Arthropoda
- Clade: Pancrustacea
- Class: Insecta
- Order: Lepidoptera
- Family: Tortricidae
- Genus: Eugnosta
- Species: E. ensinoana

Binomial name
- Eugnosta ensinoana Razowski & Becker, 2007

Species of moth

Eugnosta ensinoana is a species of moth of the family Tortricidae. It is found in Mexico (Tamaulipas).

The wingspan is 10–12 mm.
