= Afroploce =

Scientific classification
- Domain: Eukaryota
- Kingdom: Animalia
- Phylum: Arthropoda
- Class: Insecta
- Order: Lepidoptera
- Family: Tortricidae
- Tribe: Olethreutini
- Genus: Afroploce; Aarvik, 2004

Genus of tortrix moths

Afroploce is a genus of moths belonging to the subfamily Tortricinae of the family Tortricidae.

== Species ==
- Afroploce cleta Razowski & Wojtusiak, 2012
- Afroploce ealana Aarvik, 2004
- Afroploce karsholti Aarvik, 2004
- Afroploce mabalingwae Razowski, 2008
- Afroploce turiana Aarvik, 2004

== See also ==
- List of Tortricidae genera
