= Eugnosta subsynaetera =

Scientific classification
- Kingdom: Animalia
- Phylum: Arthropoda
- Clade: Pancrustacea
- Class: Insecta
- Order: Lepidoptera
- Family: Tortricidae
- Genus: Eugnosta
- Species: E. subsynaetera

Binomial name
- Eugnosta subsynaetera Razowski & Becker, 2002

Species of moth

Eugnosta subsynaetera is a species of moth of the family Tortricidae. It is found in Brazil (Goias).

The wingspan is about 15 mm.
