= Paramesiodes minor =

Scientific classification
- Domain: Eukaryota
- Kingdom: Animalia
- Phylum: Arthropoda
- Class: Insecta
- Order: Lepidoptera
- Family: Tortricidae
- Genus: Paramesiodes
- Species: P. minor

Binomial name
- Paramesiodes minor Diakonoff, 1960

Species of moth

Paramesiodes minor is a species of moth of the family Tortricidae. It is found on Madagascar.
