= Orilesa =

Scientific classification
- Kingdom: Animalia
- Phylum: Arthropoda
- Class: Insecta
- Order: Lepidoptera
- Family: Tortricidae
- Tribe: Archipini
- Genus: Orilesa; Razowski, 2006

Genus of tortrix moths

Orilesa is a genus of moths of the family Tortricidae.

== Species ==
- Orilesa caminosa Razowski, 2012
- Orilesa mediocris (Meyrick, 1914)
- Orilesa olearis (Meyrick, 1912)

== Etymology ==
The genus name is an anagram of the name of the type-species, Orilesa olearis.

== See also ==
- List of Tortricidae genera
