= Eugnosta beevorana =

Scientific classification
- Domain: Eukaryota
- Kingdom: Animalia
- Phylum: Arthropoda
- Class: Insecta
- Order: Lepidoptera
- Family: Tortricidae
- Genus: Eugnosta
- Species: E. beevorana

Binomial name
- Eugnosta beevorana (Comstock, 1940)

Synonyms
- Carolella beevorana Comstock, 1940

Species of moth

Eugnosta beevorana is a species of moth of the family Tortricidae. It is found in Arizona and California.

The wingspan is 18–21 mm (0.71–0.83 in). Adults have been recorded on wing from December to March.
