= Eugnosta marginana =

Scientific classification
- Domain: Eukaryota
- Kingdom: Animalia
- Phylum: Arthropoda
- Class: Insecta
- Order: Lepidoptera
- Family: Tortricidae
- Genus: Eugnosta
- Species: E. marginana

Binomial name
- Eugnosta marginana Aarvik, 2010

Species of moth

Eugnosta marginana is a species of moth of the family Tortricidae. It is found in Uganda. The habitat consists of open areas close to mountain rain forests.

The wingspan is 12–14 mm.
