= Eugnosta selecta =

Scientific classification
- Kingdom: Animalia
- Phylum: Arthropoda
- Class: Insecta
- Order: Lepidoptera
- Family: Tortricidae
- Genus: Eugnosta
- Species: E. selecta

Binomial name
- Eugnosta selecta (Meyrick, 1931)

Synonyms
- Euxanthis selecta Meyrick, 1931

Species of moth

Eugnosta selecta is a species of moth of the family Tortricidae. It is found in Paraguay.
