= Eugnosta molybdina =

Scientific classification
- Domain: Eukaryota
- Kingdom: Animalia
- Phylum: Arthropoda
- Class: Insecta
- Order: Lepidoptera
- Family: Tortricidae
- Genus: Eugnosta
- Species: E. molybdina

Binomial name
- Eugnosta molybdina (Clarke, 1968)

Synonyms
- Carolella molybdina Clarke, 1968

Species of moth

Eugnosta molybdina is a species of moth of the family Tortricidae. It is found in Mexico (San Luis Potosí).
