= Eugnosta aphrobapta =

Scientific classification
- Kingdom: Animalia
- Phylum: Arthropoda
- Class: Insecta
- Order: Lepidoptera
- Family: Tortricidae
- Genus: Eugnosta
- Species: E. aphrobapta

Binomial name
- Eugnosta aphrobapta (Meyrick, 1931)

Synonyms
- Eulia aphrobapta Meyrick, 1931

Species of moth

Eugnosta aphrobapta is a species of moth of the family Tortricidae. It is found in Brazil (Esprito Santo and Rondonia), Ecuador (Napo Province).
