= Eugnosta tenacia =

Scientific classification
- Kingdom: Animalia
- Phylum: Arthropoda
- Clade: Pancrustacea
- Class: Insecta
- Order: Lepidoptera
- Family: Tortricidae
- Genus: Eugnosta
- Species: E. tenacia

Binomial name
- Eugnosta tenacia Razowski & Becker, 1994

Species of moth

Eugnosta tenacia is a species of moth of the family Tortricidae. It is found in Brazil (Distrito Federal, Minas Gerais, Santa Catarina).

The larva have been recorded boring in tip of a shoot of B. cossinifolia.
