= Hectaphelia =

Scientific classification
- Kingdom: Animalia
- Phylum: Arthropoda
- Class: Insecta
- Order: Lepidoptera
- Family: Tortricidae
- Tribe: Archipini
- Genus: Hectaphelia; Razowski, 2006

Genus of tortrix moths

Hectaphelia is a genus of moths of the family Tortricidae.

== Species ==
- Hectaphelia hectaea (Meyrick, 1911)
- Hectaphelia kapakoana Razowski, 2006
- Hectaphelia mensaria (Meyrick, 1912)
- Hectaphelia metapyrrha (Meyrick, 1918)
- Hectaphelia periculosa Razowski, 2006
- Hectaphelia pharetrata (Meyrick, 1909)
- Hectaphelia sporadias (Meyrick, 1920)
- Hectaphelia tortuosa (Meyrick, 1912)
- Hectaphelia vestigialis (Meyrick, 1914)

== Etymology ==
The generic name refers to the name of the closely related genus Aphelia and the name of one of the species (Hectaphelia hectaea).

== See also ==
- List of Tortricidae genera
