= Eugnosta emarcida =

Scientific classification
- Kingdom: Animalia
- Phylum: Arthropoda
- Clade: Pancrustacea
- Class: Insecta
- Order: Lepidoptera
- Family: Tortricidae
- Genus: Eugnosta
- Species: E. emarcida

Binomial name
- Eugnosta emarcida (Razowski & Becker, 1986)

Synonyms
- Carolella emarcida Razowski & Becker, 1986; Carolella emercida Razowski, in Heppner, 1995

Species of moth

Eugnosta emarcida is a species of moth of the family Tortricidae. It is found in Honduras and Mexico.
