= Goniotorna erratica =

Scientific classification
- Domain: Eukaryota
- Kingdom: Animalia
- Phylum: Arthropoda
- Class: Insecta
- Order: Lepidoptera
- Family: Tortricidae
- Genus: Goniotorna
- Species: G. erratica

Binomial name
- Goniotorna erratica (Diakonoff, 1948)

Synonyms
- Syndemis erratica Diakonoff, 1948

Species of moth

Goniotorna erratica is a species of moth of the family Tortricidae. It is found in Madagascar.

The larvae feed on Bignonia vetusta and Lonicera and Ficus species.
