= Metamesia physetopa =

Scientific classification
- Kingdom: Animalia
- Phylum: Arthropoda
- Class: Insecta
- Order: Lepidoptera
- Family: Tortricidae
- Genus: Metamesia
- Species: M. physetopa

Binomial name
- Metamesia physetopa (Meyrick, 1932)

Synonyms
- Tortrix physetopa Meyrick, 1932

Species of moth

Metamesia physetopa is a species of moth of the family Tortricidae. It is found in Ethiopia and Uganda.
