= Metamesia endopyrrha =

Scientific classification
- Kingdom: Animalia
- Phylum: Arthropoda
- Class: Insecta
- Order: Lepidoptera
- Family: Tortricidae
- Genus: Metamesia
- Species: M. endopyrrha

Binomial name
- Metamesia endopyrrha (Meyrick, 1930)

Synonyms
- Tortrix endopyrrha Meyrick, 1930

Species of moth

Metamesia endopyrrha is a species of moth of the family Tortricidae. It is found in Uganda.
