= Eugnosta jequiena =

Scientific classification
- Kingdom: Animalia
- Phylum: Arthropoda
- Clade: Pancrustacea
- Class: Insecta
- Order: Lepidoptera
- Family: Tortricidae
- Genus: Eugnosta
- Species: E. jequiena

Binomial name
- Eugnosta jequiena Razowski & Becker, 2007

Species of moth

Eugnosta jequiena is a species of moth of the family Tortricidae. It is found in Brazil (Bahia).

The wingspan is about 11 mm.

== Etymology ==
The species name refers to the type locality.
