= Eugnosta desinens =

Scientific classification
- Kingdom: Animalia
- Phylum: Arthropoda
- Class: Insecta
- Order: Lepidoptera
- Family: Tortricidae
- Genus: Eugnosta
- Species: E. desinens

Binomial name
- Eugnosta desinens (Razowski, 1986)

Synonyms
- Carolella desinens Razowski, 1986

Species of moth

Eugnosta desinens is a species of moth of the family Tortricidae. It is found in Mexico (Veracruz).
