= Eugnosta ouralia =

Scientific classification
- Kingdom: Animalia
- Phylum: Arthropoda
- Class: Insecta
- Order: Lepidoptera
- Family: Tortricidae
- Genus: Eugnosta
- Species: E. ouralia

Binomial name
- Eugnosta ouralia (Razowski, 1986)

Synonyms
- Carolella ouralia Razowski, 1986

Species of moth

Eugnosta ouralia is a species of moth of the family Tortricidae. It is found in Mexico (Durango).
