= Goniotorna =

Scientific classification
- Kingdom: Animalia
- Phylum: Arthropoda
- Clade: Pancrustacea
- Class: Insecta
- Order: Lepidoptera
- Family: Tortricidae
- Tribe: Archipini
- Genus: Goniotorna; Meyrick, 1933

Synonyms
- Oestophyes Diakonoff, 1960; Serruligera Diakonoff, 1960; Tenuisaccula Diakonoff, 1960

Genus of tortrix moths

Goniotorna is a genus of moths belonging to the subfamily Tortricinae of the family Tortricidae.

== Species ==
- Goniotorna angusta Diakonoff, 1960
- Goniotorna chersopis Meyrick, 1933
- Goniotorna chondrocentra Diakonoff, 1973
- Goniotorna decipiens Diakonoff, 1960
- Goniotorna deinozona Diakonoff, 1973
- Goniotorna erratica (Diakonoff, 1948)
- Goniotorna heteropa Diakonoff, 1960
- Goniotorna iecoricolor Diakonoff, 1960
- Goniotorna illustra Diakonoff, 1960
- Goniotorna insatiata Diakonoff, 1973
- Goniotorna irresoluta Diakonoff, 1960
- Goniotorna lacrimosa Diakonoff, 1960
- Goniotorna leucophrys Diakonoff, 1960
- Goniotorna macula Diakonoff, 1970
- Goniotorna megalogonia Diakonoff, 1960
- Goniotorna melanoconis Diakonoff, 1960
- Goniotorna mesostena Diakonoff, 1963
- Goniotorna mianta Diakonoff, 1973
- Goniotorna micrognatha Diakonoff, 1960
- Goniotorna mucida Diakonoff, 1960
- Goniotorna niphotoma Diakonoff, 1960
- Goniotorna pleuroptila (Meyrick, 1937)
- Goniotorna polyops Diakonoff, 1960
- Goniotorna praeornata Diakonoff, 1960
- Goniotorna praerupta Diakonoff, 1960
- Goniotorna rhodolemma Diakonoff, 1960
- Goniotorna rhodoptila Diakonoff, 1960
- Goniotorna suspiciosa Diakonoff, 1960
- Goniotorna synastra (Meyrick, 1918)
- Goniotorna trignoma Diakonoff, 1973
- Goniotorna trigodes Diakonoff, 1973
- Goniotorna vadoni Diakonoff, 1960
- Goniotorna valentini Karisch, 2008
- Goniotorna verticillata Diakonoff, 1960
- Goniotorna vinacea Diakonoff, 1960
- Goniotorna vulpicolor Diakonoff, 1960

== See also ==
- List of Tortricidae genera
