= Eugnosta medioxima =

Scientific classification
- Kingdom: Animalia
- Phylum: Arthropoda
- Class: Insecta
- Order: Lepidoptera
- Family: Tortricidae
- Genus: Eugnosta
- Species: E. medioxima

Binomial name
- Eugnosta medioxima (Razowski, 1986)

Synonyms
- Carolella medioxima Razowski, 1986

Species of moth

Eugnosta medioxima is a species of moth of the family Tortricidae. It is found in Mexico (Nayarit).
