= Eugnosta falarica =

Scientific classification
- Kingdom: Animalia
- Phylum: Arthropoda
- Class: Insecta
- Order: Lepidoptera
- Family: Tortricidae
- Genus: Eugnosta
- Species: E. falarica

Binomial name
- Eugnosta falarica Razowski, 1970

Species of moth

Eugnosta falarica is a species of moth of the family Tortricidae. It is found in Mongolia.

== Distribution ==
- Regions of the Russian Federation: the Trans-Baikal.
