= Eugnosta romanovi =

Scientific classification
- Domain: Eukaryota
- Kingdom: Animalia
- Phylum: Arthropoda
- Class: Insecta
- Order: Lepidoptera
- Family: Tortricidae
- Genus: Eugnosta
- Species: E. romanovi

Binomial name
- Eugnosta romanovi (Kennel, 1900)

Synonyms
- Euxanthis romanovi Kennel, 1900

Species of moth

Eugnosta romanovi is a species of moth of the family Tortricidae. It is found in China (Xinjiang) and Russia.
