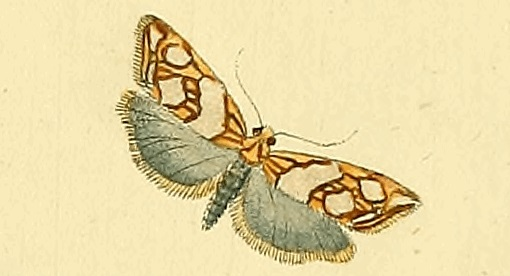
- Eugnosta lathoniana

Scientific classification
- Kingdom: Animalia
- Phylum: Arthropoda
- Class: Insecta
- Order: Lepidoptera
- Family: Tortricidae
- Tribe: Cochylini
- Genus: Eugnosta; Hubner, 1825

= Eugnosta =

Genus of tortrix moths

Eugnosta is a genus of moths belonging to the family Tortricidae.

== Species ==
- Eugnosta acanthana Razowski, 1967
- Eugnosta aguila (Razowski & Becker, 1986)
- Eugnosta anxifera Razowski, 1993
- Eugnosta aphrobapta (Meyrick, 1931)
- Eugnosta argentinae (Razowski, 1967)
- Eugnosta argyroplaca (Meyrick, 1931)
- Eugnosta arrecta Razowski, 1970
- Eugnosta assecula (Meyrick, 1909)
- Eugnosta asthenia (Clarke, 1968)
- Eugnosta beevorana (Comstock, 1940)
- Eugnosta bimaculana (Robinson, 1869)
- Eugnosta brownana Metzler & Forbes, 2012
- Eugnosta busckana (Comstock, 1939)
- Eugnosta californica (Razowski, 1986)
- Eugnosta caracana Razowski & Becker, 2002
- Eugnosta cataracta Aarvik, 2004
- Eugnosta chalasma Razowski, 1993
- Eugnosta chalicophora Razowski, 1999
- Eugnosta chemsakiana (Razowski, 1986)
- Eugnosta chromophanes Razowski, 1994
- Eugnosta cipoana Razowski & Becker, 2007
- Eugnosta deceptana (Busck, 1907)
- Eugnosta desinens (Razowski, 1986)
- Eugnosta dives (Butler, 1878)
- Eugnosta dyschiria (Razowski, 1986)
- Eugnosta emarcida (Razowski & Becker, 1986)
- Eugnosta ensinoana Razowski & Becker, 2007
- Eugnosta erigeronana (Riley, 1881)
- Eugnosta euglypta (Meyrick, 1927)
- Eugnosta falarica Razowski, 1970
- Eugnosta fenestrana Razowski, 1964
- Eugnosta feriata (Meyrick, 1913)
- Eugnosta fernandoana Razowski & Becker, 2007
- Eugnosta fraudulenta Razowski & Becker, 2007
- Eugnosta heteroclita Razowski, 1993
- Eugnosta hydrargyrana (Eversmann, 1842)
- Eugnosta hypsitropha (Bradley, 1965)
- Eugnosta hysterosiana (Razowski, 1967)
- Eugnosta jequiena Razowski & Becker, 2007
- Eugnosta lathoniana (Hubner, [1799-1800])
- Eugnosta lauta Razowski, 1993
- Eugnosta leonana (Razowski, 1986)
- Eugnosta lukaszi Razowski, 2005
- Eugnosta macneilli (Razowski, 1986)
- Eugnosta magnificana (Rebel, 1914)
- Eugnosta marginana Aarvik, 2010
- Eugnosta matengana Razowski, 1993
- Eugnosta medioxima (Razowski, 1986)
- Eugnosta medvedevi (Gerasimov, 1929)
- Eugnosta mexicana (Busck, 1907)
- Eugnosta meyi Aarvik, 2004
- Eugnosta misella Razowski, 1993
- Eugnosta mitis Razowski, 1993
- Eugnosta molybdanthes (Meyrick, 1932)
- Eugnosta molybdina (Clarke, 1968)
- Eugnosta multifasciana (Kennel, 1899)
- Eugnosta namibiana Aarvik, 2004
- Eugnosta niveicaput Razowski, 2005
- Eugnosta ochrolemma (Razowski, 1986)
- Eugnosta opalina (Razowski, 1986)
- Eugnosta ouralia (Razowski, 1986)
- Eugnosta pamirana Obraztsov, 1943
- Eugnosta parapamirana Razowski, 2005
- Eugnosta parmisella Razowski, 2005
- Eugnosta parreyssiana (Duponchel, in Godart, 1842)
- Eugnosta percnoptila (Meyrick, 1933)
- Eugnosta plusiana (Kennel, 1899)
- Eugnosta polymacula Razowski & Becker, 2002
- Eugnosta proanoa Razowski & Pelz, 2001
- Eugnosta replicata (Meyrick, 1913)
- Eugnosta romanovi (Kennel, 1900)
- Eugnosta rufocentra Razowski & Becker, 2002
- Eugnosta saltillana (Razowski, 1986)
- Eugnosta sartana (Hübner, 1823)
- Eugnosta sebasta Razowski, 1994
- Eugnosta selecta (Meyrick, 1931)
- Eugnosta stigmatica (Meyrick, 1909)
- Eugnosta subsynaetera Razowski & Becker, 2002
- Eugnosta synaetera Razowski & Becker, 1994
- Eugnosta telemacana Razowski & Becker, 2007
- Eugnosta tenacia Razowski & Becker, 1994
- Eugnosta trimeni (Felder & Rogenhofer, 1875)
- Eugnosta uganoa Razowski, 1993
- Eugnosta umbraculata (Meyrick, 1918)
- Eugnosta umtamvuna Razowski, 2015
- Eugnosta unifasciana Aarvik, 2010
- Eugnosta ussuriana (Caradja, 1926)
- Eugnosta vecorda Razowski, 1993
- Eugnosta willettana (Comstock, 1939)
- Eugnosta xanthochroma Razowski, 1993

== Unknown placement ==
- Eugnosta chionochlaena (Meyrick, 1932)

== Synonyms ==
- Argyrolepia Stephens, 1829, Syst. Cat. Br. Insects (2): 190. Type species: Tortrix lathoniana Hübner [1799-1800].
- Safra Walker, 1863, List Specimens lepid. Insects Colln. Br. Mus. 27: 195. Type species: Safra metaphaeella Walker, 1863.
- Trachybyrsis Meyrick, 1927 (synonymized by Razowski, 2011: 404)
- Carolella Busck, 1939 (replacement name for Pharmacis Hübner, 1823). (synonymized by Razowski, 2011: 404)
- Pharmacis Hübner, 1823 (preoccupied)

== See also ==
- List of Tortricidae genera
