= Eugnosta chalicophora =

Scientific classification
- Kingdom: Animalia
- Phylum: Arthropoda
- Class: Insecta
- Order: Lepidoptera
- Family: Tortricidae
- Genus: Eugnosta
- Species: E. chalicophora

Binomial name
- Eugnosta chalicophora Razowski, 1999

Species of moth

Eugnosta chalicophora is a species of moth of the family Tortricidae. It is found in the Dominican Republic.
