= Eugnosta plusiana =

Scientific classification
- Domain: Eukaryota
- Kingdom: Animalia
- Phylum: Arthropoda
- Class: Insecta
- Order: Lepidoptera
- Family: Tortricidae
- Genus: Eugnosta
- Species: E. plusiana

Binomial name
- Eugnosta plusiana (Kennel, 1899)

Synonyms
- Cochylis plusiana Kennel, 1899; Eugnosta plusiana ab. clarana Obraztsov, 1943

Species of moth

Eugnosta plusiana is a species of moth of the family Tortricidae. It is found in Turkmenistan and Russia.
