= Recaraceria =

Scientific classification
- Kingdom: Animalia
- Phylum: Arthropoda
- Class: Insecta
- Order: Lepidoptera
- Family: Tortricidae
- Tribe: Olethreutini
- Genus: Recaraceria; Razowski, 2010

Genus of moths

Recaraceria is a genus of moths belonging to the subfamily Olethreutinae of the family Tortricidae.

== Species ==
- Recaraceria hormoterma (Meyrick, 1938)
- Recaraceria carceraria (Meyrick, 1913)

== Etymology ==
The genus name is a combination of letters using those of the name of the type-species of the genus (Recaraceria carceraria) plus an extra e.

== See also ==
- List of Tortricidae genera
