= Eugnosta willettana =

Scientific classification
- Kingdom: Animalia
- Phylum: Arthropoda
- Class: Insecta
- Order: Lepidoptera
- Family: Tortricidae
- Genus: Eugnosta
- Species: E. willettana

Binomial name
- Eugnosta willettana (Comstock, 1939)

Synonyms
- Carolella busckana f. willettana Comstock, 1939

Species of moth

Eugnosta willettana is a species of moth of the family Tortricidae. It is found in North America, where it has been recorded from southern California and southern Arizona, as well as Mexico.

The wingspan is 24–27 mm. Adults have been recorded on wing from January to February.
