= Eugnosta fraudulenta =

Scientific classification
- Kingdom: Animalia
- Phylum: Arthropoda
- Clade: Pancrustacea
- Class: Insecta
- Order: Lepidoptera
- Family: Tortricidae
- Genus: Eugnosta
- Species: E. fraudulenta

Binomial name
- Eugnosta fraudulenta Razowski & Becker, 2007

Species of moth

Eugnosta fraudulenta is a species of moth of the family Tortricidae. It is found in Honduras and on the British Virgin Islands and Cuba.

The wingspan is 9–14 mm.
