= Orilesa mediocris =

Scientific classification
- Domain: Eukaryota
- Kingdom: Animalia
- Phylum: Arthropoda
- Class: Insecta
- Order: Lepidoptera
- Family: Tortricidae
- Genus: Orilesa
- Species: O. mediocris

Binomial name
- Orilesa mediocris (Meyrick, 1914)

Synonyms
- Cnephasia mediocris Meyrick, 1914

Species of moth

Orilesa mediocris is a species of moth of the family Tortricidae. It is found in Kenya.
