= Tuckia =

Scientific classification
- Kingdom: Animalia
- Phylum: Arthropoda
- Class: Insecta
- Order: Lepidoptera
- Family: Tortricidae
- Tribe: Archipini
- Genus: Tuckia; Razowski, 2001

Genus of tortrix moths

Tuckia is a genus of moths belonging to the family Tortricidae.

== Species ==
- Tuckia africana (Walsingham, 1881)
- Tuckia zuluana Razowski, 2001

== See also ==
- List of Tortricidae genera
