= Eugnosta namibiana =

Scientific classification
- Domain: Eukaryota
- Kingdom: Animalia
- Phylum: Arthropoda
- Class: Insecta
- Order: Lepidoptera
- Family: Tortricidae
- Genus: Eugnosta
- Species: E. namibiana

Binomial name
- Eugnosta namibiana Aarvik, 2004

Species of moth

Eugnosta namibiana is a species of moth of the family Tortricidae. It is found in Namibia.
