= Metamesia catadryas =

Scientific classification
- Kingdom: Animalia
- Phylum: Arthropoda
- Class: Insecta
- Order: Lepidoptera
- Family: Tortricidae
- Genus: Metamesia
- Species: M. catadryas

Binomial name
- Metamesia catadryas (Meyrick, 1937)

Synonyms
- Tortrix catadryas Meyrick, 1937; Lozotaenia catadryas

Species of moth

Metamesia catadryas is a species of moth of the family Tortricidae. It is found in South Africa.
