= Eugnosta opalina =

Scientific classification
- Kingdom: Animalia
- Phylum: Arthropoda
- Class: Insecta
- Order: Lepidoptera
- Family: Tortricidae
- Genus: Eugnosta
- Species: E. opalina

Binomial name
- Eugnosta opalina (Razowski, 1986)

Synonyms
- Carolella opalina Razowski, 1986

Species of moth

Eugnosta opalina is a species of moth of the family Tortricidae. It is found in Mexico (Durango).
