= Metamesia episema =

Scientific classification
- Domain: Eukaryota
- Kingdom: Animalia
- Phylum: Arthropoda
- Class: Insecta
- Order: Lepidoptera
- Family: Tortricidae
- Genus: Metamesia
- Species: M. episema

Binomial name
- Metamesia episema Diakonoff, 1960

Species of moth

Metamesia episema is a species of moth of the family Tortricidae. It is found in Ethiopia, Kenya, Madagascar and South Africa (Western Cape, KwaZulu-Natal).
