= Recaraceria hormoterma =

Scientific classification
- Kingdom: Animalia
- Phylum: Arthropoda
- Class: Insecta
- Order: Lepidoptera
- Family: Tortricidae
- Genus: Recaraceria
- Species: R. hormoterma

Binomial name
- Recaraceria hormoterma (Meyrick, 1938)

Synonyms
- Argyroploce hormoterma Meyrick, 1938

Species of moth

Recaraceria hormoterma is a species of moth of the family Tortricidae. It is found in the Democratic Republic of the Congo.
