= Brachiolia =

Scientific classification
- Kingdom: Animalia
- Phylum: Arthropoda
- Class: Insecta
- Order: Lepidoptera
- Family: Tortricidae
- Tribe: Tortricini
- Genus: Brachiolia; Razowski, 1964

Genus of tortrix moths

Brachiolia is a genus of moths belonging to the subfamily Tortricinae of the family Tortricidae.

== Species ==
- Brachiolia amblopis (Meyrick, 1911)
- Brachiolia egenella (Walker, 1864)
- Brachiolia obscurana Razowski, 1966
- Brachiolia wojtusiaki Razowski, 1986

== See also ==
- List of Tortricidae genera
