= Eugnosta polymacula =

Scientific classification
- Kingdom: Animalia
- Phylum: Arthropoda
- Clade: Pancrustacea
- Class: Insecta
- Order: Lepidoptera
- Family: Tortricidae
- Genus: Eugnosta
- Species: E. polymacula

Binomial name
- Eugnosta polymacula Razowski & Becker, 2002

Species of moth

Eugnosta polymacula is a species of moth of the family Tortricidae. It is found in Brazil (Rio de Janeiro).

The wingspan is about 24 mm.
