= Eugnosta caracana =

Scientific classification
- Kingdom: Animalia
- Phylum: Arthropoda
- Clade: Pancrustacea
- Class: Insecta
- Order: Lepidoptera
- Family: Tortricidae
- Genus: Eugnosta
- Species: E. caracana

Binomial name
- Eugnosta caracana Razowski & Becker, 2002

Species of moth

Eugnosta caracana is a species of moth of the family Tortricidae. It is found in Brazil (Minas Gerais).

The wingspan is 15–16 mm.
