= Eugnosta medvedevi =

Scientific classification
- Domain: Eukaryota
- Kingdom: Animalia
- Phylum: Arthropoda
- Class: Insecta
- Order: Lepidoptera
- Family: Tortricidae
- Genus: Eugnosta
- Species: E. medvedevi

Binomial name
- Eugnosta medvedevi (Gerasimov, 1929)

Synonyms
- Euxanthis medvedevi Gerasimov, 1929

Species of moth

Eugnosta medvedevi is a species of moth of the family Tortricidae. It is found in eastern Ukraine and Russia (Lower Volga). Its habitat consists of sandy steppe.

The wingspan is about 30 mm. Adults have been recorded on wing in September.
