= Eugnosta matengana =

Scientific classification
- Kingdom: Animalia
- Phylum: Arthropoda
- Class: Insecta
- Order: Lepidoptera
- Family: Tortricidae
- Genus: Eugnosta
- Species: E. matengana

Binomial name
- Eugnosta matengana Razowski, 1993

Species of moth

Eugnosta matengana is a species of moth of the family Tortricidae. It is found in Tanzania.
