= Eugnosta meyi =

Scientific classification
- Kingdom: Animalia
- Phylum: Arthropoda
- Clade: Pancrustacea
- Class: Insecta
- Order: Lepidoptera
- Family: Tortricidae
- Genus: Eugnosta
- Species: E. meyi

Binomial name
- Eugnosta meyi Aarvik, 2004

Species of moth

Eugnosta meyi is a species of moth of the family Tortricidae. It is found in Namibia.
