= Fulcrifera horisma =

Scientific classification
- Kingdom: Animalia
- Phylum: Arthropoda
- Class: Insecta
- Order: Lepidoptera
- Family: Tortricidae
- Genus: Fulcrifera
- Species: F. horisma

Binomial name
- Fulcrifera horisma Razowski, 2013

Species of moth

Fulcrifera horisma is a moth of the family Tortricidae. It is found in Nigeria.

The wingspan is about 10.5 mm.
