= Goniotorna melanoconis =

Scientific classification
- Kingdom: Animalia
- Phylum: Arthropoda
- Class: Insecta
- Order: Lepidoptera
- Family: Tortricidae
- Genus: Goniotorna
- Species: G. melanoconis

Binomial name
- Goniotorna melanoconis Diakonoff, 1960

Species of moth

Goniotorna melanoconis is a species of moth of the family Tortricidae. It is found in Madagascar.
