= Brachiolia wojtusiaki =

Scientific classification
- Kingdom: Animalia
- Phylum: Arthropoda
- Class: Insecta
- Order: Lepidoptera
- Family: Tortricidae
- Genus: Brachiolia
- Species: B. wojtusiaki

Binomial name
- Brachiolia wojtusiaki Razowski, 1986

Species of moth

Brachiolia wojtusiaki is a species of moth of the family Tortricidae. It is found in Nigeria.

The wingspan is about 12 mm.
