= Goniotorna niphotoma =

Scientific classification
- Kingdom: Animalia
- Phylum: Arthropoda
- Clade: Pancrustacea
- Class: Insecta
- Order: Lepidoptera
- Family: Tortricidae
- Genus: Goniotorna
- Species: G. niphotoma

Binomial name
- Goniotorna niphotoma Diakonoff, 1960

Species of moth

Goniotorna niphotoma is a species of moth of the family Tortricidae. It is found in Madagascar.
