= Goniotorna chersopis =

Scientific classification
- Kingdom: Animalia
- Phylum: Arthropoda
- Class: Insecta
- Order: Lepidoptera
- Family: Tortricidae
- Genus: Goniotorna
- Species: G. chersopis

Binomial name
- Goniotorna chersopis Meyrick, 1933

Species of moth

Goniotorna chersopis is a species of moth of the family Tortricidae. It is found in Madagascar.
