= Eugnosta telemacana =

Scientific classification
- Kingdom: Animalia
- Phylum: Arthropoda
- Clade: Pancrustacea
- Class: Insecta
- Order: Lepidoptera
- Family: Tortricidae
- Genus: Eugnosta
- Species: E. telemacana

Binomial name
- Eugnosta telemacana Razowski & Becker, 2007

Species of moth

Eugnosta telemacana is a species of moth of the family Tortricidae. It is found in Brazil (Parana).

The wingspan is about 20 mm.
