= Fulcrifera =

Scientific classification
- Kingdom: Animalia
- Phylum: Arthropoda
- Class: Insecta
- Order: Lepidoptera
- Family: Tortricidae
- Tribe: Grapholitini
- Genus: Fulcrifera; Danilevsky & Kuznetzov, 1968

Genus of tortrix moths

Fulcrifera is a genus of moths belonging to the subfamily Olethreutinae of the family Tortricidae.

== Species ==
- Fulcrifera affectana (Kennel, 1901)
- Fulcrifera arabica (Amsel, 1958)
- Fulcrifera cirrata Diakonoff, 1987
- Fulcrifera fumida Kuznetzov, 1971
- Fulcrifera horisma Razowski, 2013
- Fulcrifera infirmana (Kennel, 1900)
- Fulcrifera leucophaea Diakonoff, 1983
- Fulcrifera luteiceps (Kuznetzov, 1962)
- Fulcrifera mongolica Kuznetzov in Danilevsky & Kuznetzov, 1968
- Fulcrifera nigroliciana (Chrtien, 1915)
- Fulcrifera noctivaga Razowski, 1971
- Fulcrifera orientis (Kuznetzov, 1966)
- Fulcrifera periculosa (Meyrick, 1913)
- Fulcrifera persinuata Komai & Horak, in Horak, 2006
- Fulcrifera psamminitis (Meyrick, 1913)
- Fulcrifera refrigescens (Meyrick, 1924)
- Fulcrifera tricentra (Meyrick, 1907)

== See also ==
- List of Tortricidae genera
