= Eugnosta hypsitropha =

Scientific classification
- Domain: Eukaryota
- Kingdom: Animalia
- Phylum: Arthropoda
- Class: Insecta
- Order: Lepidoptera
- Family: Tortricidae
- Genus: Eugnosta
- Species: E. hypsitropha

Binomial name
- Eugnosta hypsitropha (Bradley, 1965)

Synonyms
- Trachybyrsis hypsitropha Bradley, 1965

Species of moth

Eugnosta hypsitropha is a species of moth of the family Tortricidae. It is found in the Ruwenzori Mountains in Uganda.
