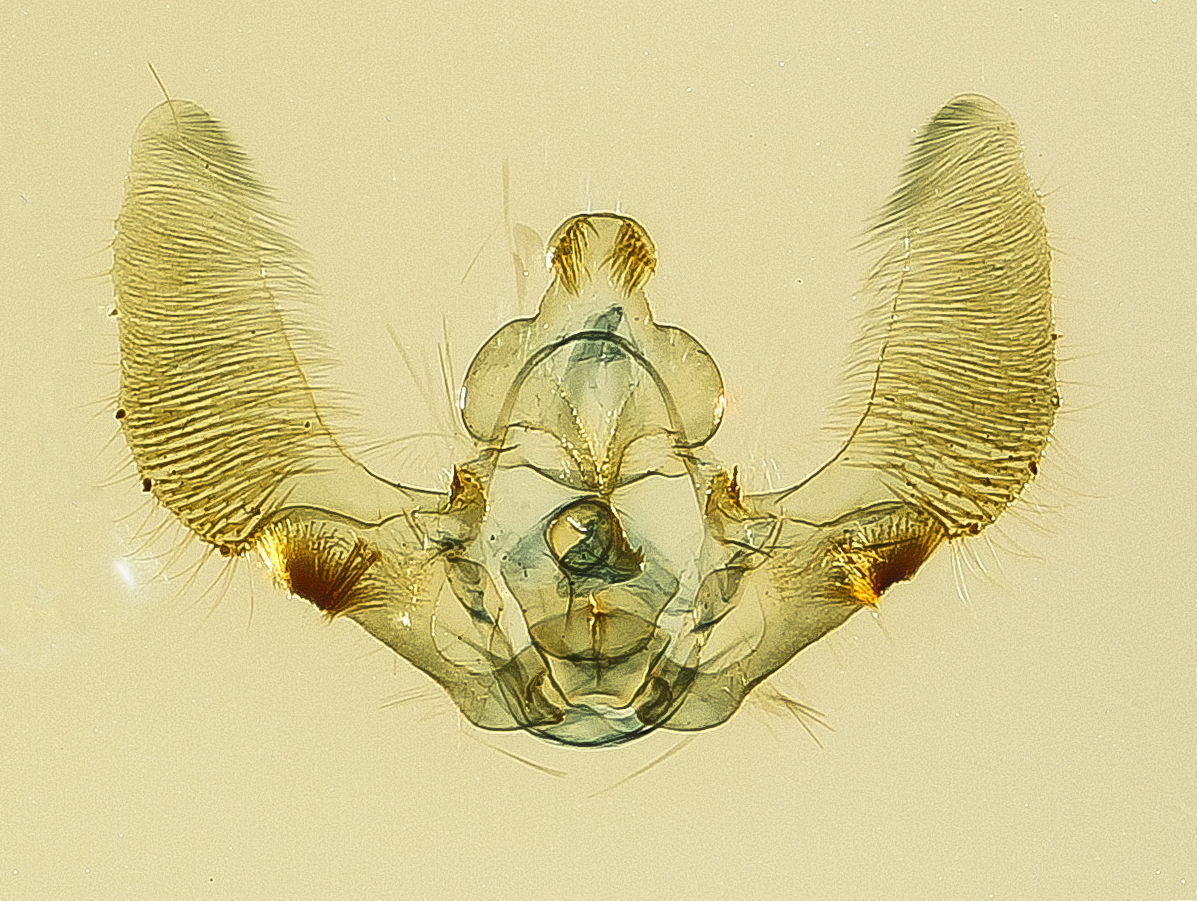
- Cosmorrhyncha male genitalia

Scientific classification
- Kingdom: Animalia
- Phylum: Arthropoda
- Class: Insecta
- Order: Lepidoptera
- Family: Tortricidae
- Tribe: Olethreutini
- Genus: Cosmorrhyncha; Meyrick, 1913

= Cosmorrhyncha =

Genus of tortrix moths

Cosmorrhyncha is a genus of moths belonging to the subfamily Olethreutinae of the family Tortricidae.

== Species ==
- Cosmorrhyncha acrocosma (Meyrick, 1908) (Africa)
- Cosmorrhyncha albistrigulana Brown and Razowski, 2020 (TL: Costa Rica)
- Cosmorrhyncha landryiBrown and Razowski, 2020 (TL: French Guiana)
- Cosmorrhyncha macrospinaBrown and Razowski, 2020 (TL: Brazil)
- Cosmorrhyncha microcosma Aarvik, 2004
- Cosmorrhyncha obuduana Razowski & Wojtusiak, 2012 (from Nigeria)
- Cosmorrhyncha ocellata (Mabille, 1900) (from Madagascar & Comoros)
- Cosmorrhyncha ocelliferana (Walker, 1863) (from Brazil)
- Cosmorrhyncha osana Brown and Razowski, 2020 (TL: Costa Rica)
- Cosmorrhyncha parintina Brown and Razowski, 2020 (TL: Brazil)
- Cosmorrhyncha tonsana (Mabille, 1900) (from Costa Rica)

== See also ==
- List of Tortricidae genera
