= Eugnosta proanoa =

Scientific classification
- Kingdom: Animalia
- Phylum: Arthropoda
- Class: Insecta
- Order: Lepidoptera
- Family: Tortricidae
- Genus: Eugnosta
- Species: E. proanoa

Binomial name
- Eugnosta proanoa Razowski & Pelz, 2001

Species of moth

Eugnosta proanoa is a species of moth of the family Tortricidae. It is found in Ecuador (Morona-Santiago Province).
