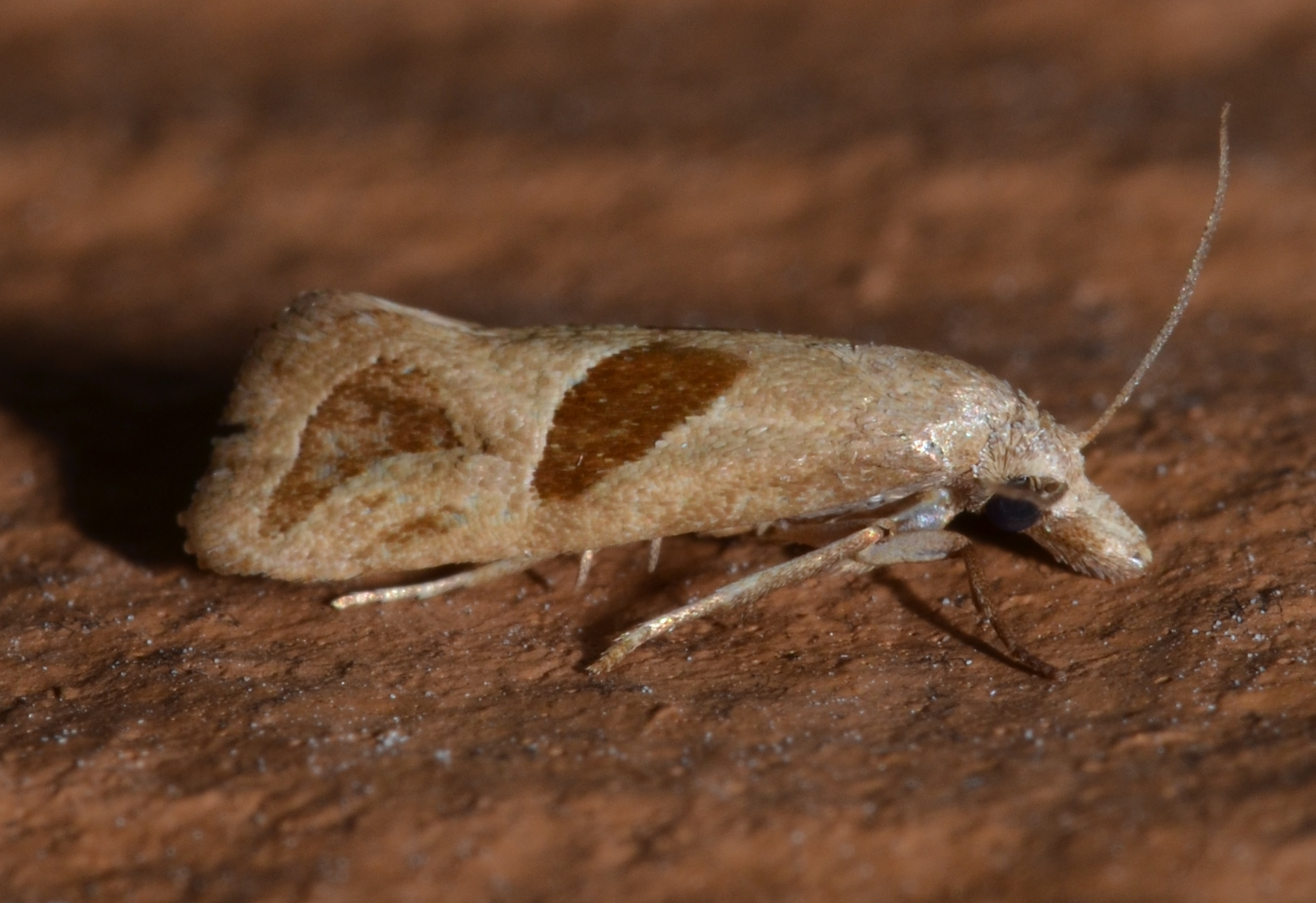

Scientific classification
- Domain: Eukaryota
- Kingdom: Animalia
- Phylum: Arthropoda
- Class: Insecta
- Order: Lepidoptera
- Family: Tortricidae
- Genus: Eugnosta
- Species: E. bimaculana

Binomial name
- Eugnosta bimaculana (Robinson, 1869)

Synonyms
- Conchylis bimaculana Robinson, 1869; Carolella bimaculana

= Eugnosta bimaculana =

Species of moth

Eugnosta bimaculana, the narrow-patch carolella moth or two-spotted carolella, is a species of moth of the family Tortricidae. It is found from Maryland to Florida, west to Texas and Oklahoma.

The wingspan is 13–14 mm. Adults have been recorded year round in the southern part of the range. In the north, the flight times are usually between May/June and September/October.
