= Doridostoma =

Scientific classification
- Domain: Eukaryota
- Kingdom: Animalia
- Phylum: Arthropoda
- Class: Insecta
- Order: Lepidoptera
- Family: Tortricidae
- Tribe: Schoenotenini
- Genus: Doridostoma; Diakonoff, 1973

Genus of moths

Doridostoma is a genus of moths belonging to the subfamily Tortricinae of the family Tortricidae.

== Species ==
- Doridostoma denotata Diakonoff, 1973
- Doridostoma stenomorpha Diakonoff, 1973
- Doridostoma symplecta (Meyrick, 1910)

== See also ==
- List of Tortricidae genera
