= Goniotorna valentini =

Scientific classification
- Domain: Eukaryota
- Kingdom: Animalia
- Phylum: Arthropoda
- Class: Insecta
- Order: Lepidoptera
- Family: Tortricidae
- Genus: Goniotorna
- Species: G. valentini

Binomial name
- Goniotorna valentini Karisch, 2008

Species of moth

Goniotorna valentini is a species of moth of the family Tortricidae. It is found on Bioko, an island in the Atlantic off Equatorial Guinea.
