= Eugnosta arrecta =

Scientific classification
- Kingdom: Animalia
- Phylum: Arthropoda
- Class: Insecta
- Order: Lepidoptera
- Family: Tortricidae
- Genus: Eugnosta
- Species: E. arrecta

Binomial name
- Eugnosta arrecta Razowski, 1970

Species of moth

Eugnosta arrecta is a species of moth of the family Tortricidae. It is found in Afghanistan.
