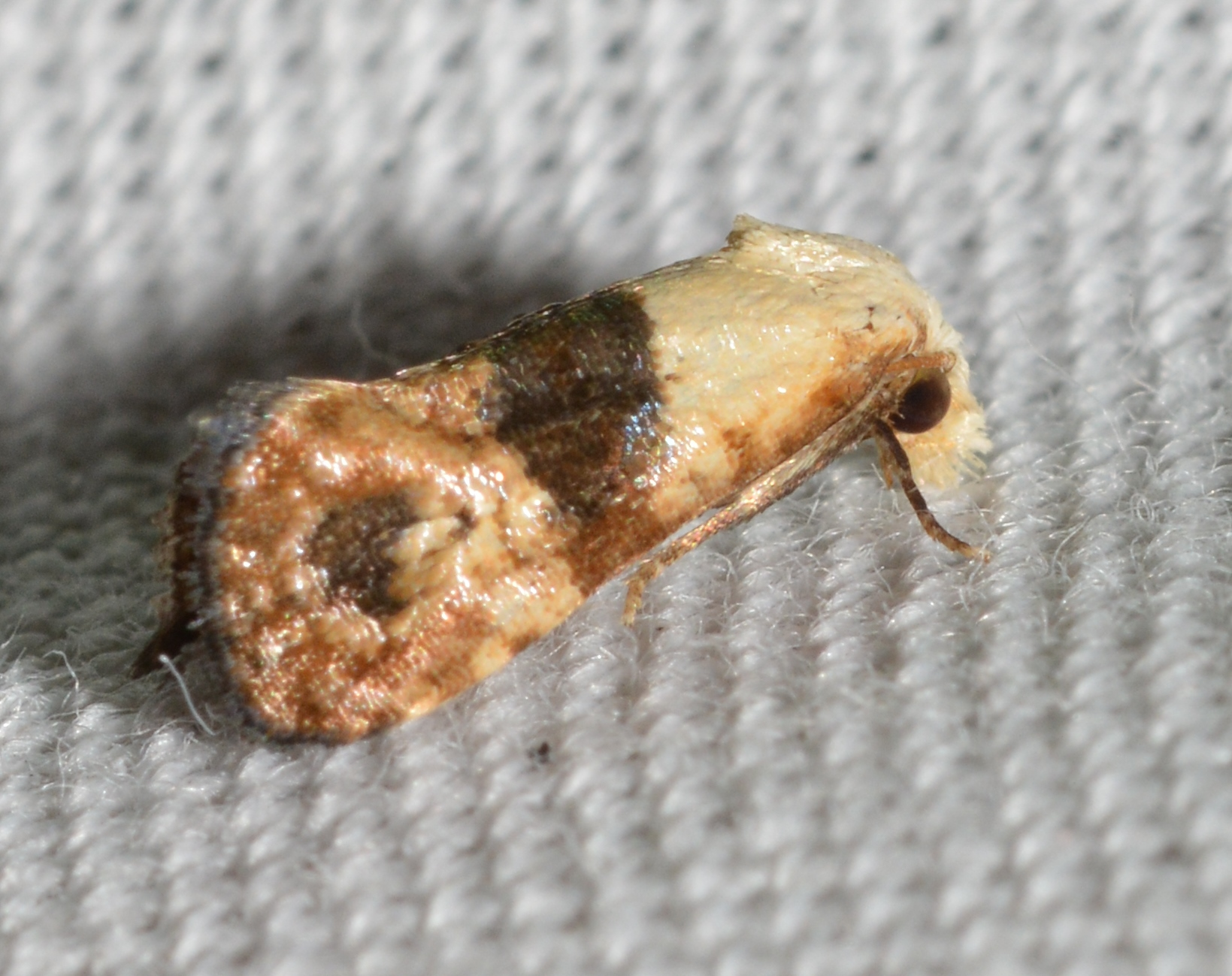

Scientific classification
- Domain: Eukaryota
- Kingdom: Animalia
- Phylum: Arthropoda
- Class: Insecta
- Order: Lepidoptera
- Family: Tortricidae
- Genus: Eugnosta
- Species: E. erigeronana

Binomial name
- Eugnosta erigeronana (Riley, 1881)

Synonyms
- Conchylis erigeronana Riley, 1881; Carolella erigeronana

= Eugnosta erigeronana =

Species of moth

Eugnosta erigeronana, the fleabane cochylid moth, is a species of moth of the family Tortricidae. It is found from Texas and Oklahoma, east to Florida, north to North Carolina and west to Illinois.

The wingspan is 11–13 mm. Adults have been recorded on wing from February to October.

The larvae are associated with fly (Cecidomyiidae) galls on Erigeron species.
