= Eugnosta busckana =

Scientific classification
- Domain: Eukaryota
- Kingdom: Animalia
- Phylum: Arthropoda
- Class: Insecta
- Order: Lepidoptera
- Family: Tortricidae
- Genus: Eugnosta
- Species: E. busckana

Binomial name
- Eugnosta busckana (Comstock, 1939)

Synonyms
- Carolella busckana Comstock, 1939

Species of moth

Eugnosta busckana is a species of moth of the family Tortricidae. It is found in California.

The wingspan is about 24 mm. Adults have been recorded on wing from November to February.
