= Goniotorna synastra =

Scientific classification
- Domain: Eukaryota
- Kingdom: Animalia
- Phylum: Arthropoda
- Class: Insecta
- Order: Lepidoptera
- Family: Tortricidae
- Genus: Goniotorna
- Species: G. synastra

Binomial name
- Goniotorna synastra (Meyrick, 1918)

Synonyms
- Tortrix synastra Meyrick, 1918; Goniotorna benevolens Diakonoff, 1963

Species of moth

Goniotorna synastra is a species of moth of the family Tortricidae. It is found in Madagascar and on Grande Comore in the Comoros.

== Subspecies ==
- Goniotorna synastra synastra (Madagascar)
- Goniotorna synastra occulta Karisch, 2008 (Grande Comoro)
