= Afroploce ealana =

Scientific classification
- Kingdom: Animalia
- Phylum: Arthropoda
- Class: Insecta
- Order: Lepidoptera
- Family: Tortricidae
- Genus: Afroploce
- Species: A. ealana

Binomial name
- Afroploce ealana Aarvik, 2004

Species of moth

Afroploce ealana is a species of moth of the family Tortricidae. It is found in the Democratic Republic of the Congo.
