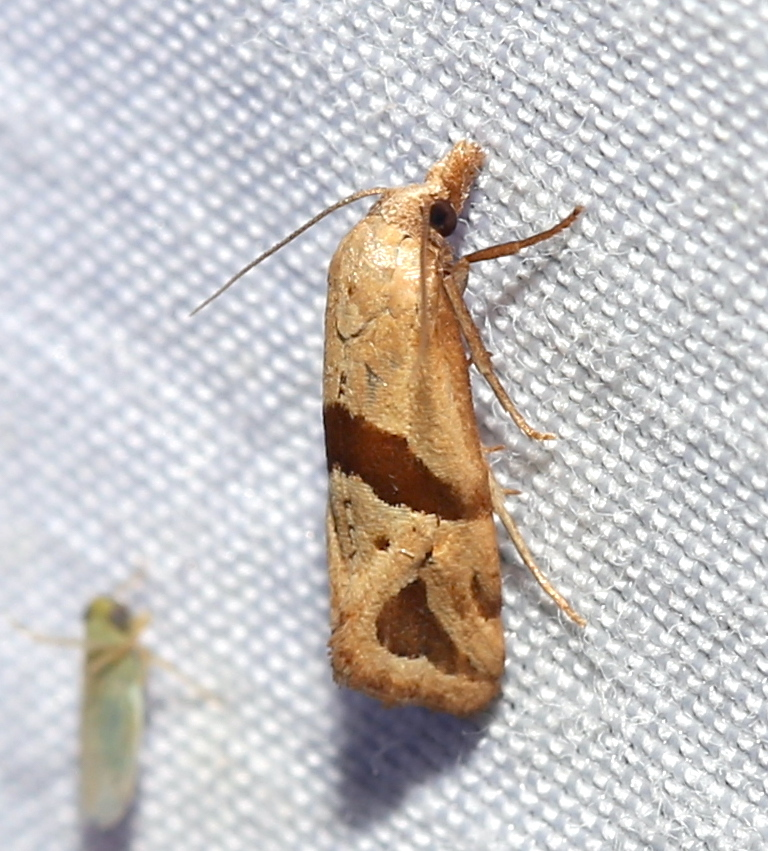

Scientific classification
- Kingdom: Animalia
- Phylum: Arthropoda
- Clade: Pancrustacea
- Class: Insecta
- Order: Lepidoptera
- Family: Tortricidae
- Genus: Eugnosta
- Species: E. sartana

Binomial name
- Eugnosta sartana (Hubner, 1823)

Synonyms
- Pharmacis sartana Hubner, 1823; Carolella sartana

= Eugnosta sartana =

Species of moth

Eugnosta sartana, the broad-patch carolella moth, is a species of moth of the family Tortricidae. It is found from Pennsylvania to Florida and from Missouri to Texas.

The wingspan is 10–15 mm (0.39–0.59 in). Adults have been recorded year round in the southern part of the range. In the north, the main flight time ranges from April to November.
