= Paramesiodes =

Scientific classification
- Domain: Eukaryota
- Kingdom: Animalia
- Phylum: Arthropoda
- Class: Insecta
- Order: Lepidoptera
- Family: Tortricidae
- Tribe: Archipini
- Genus: Paramesiodes; Diakonoff, 1960

Genus of tortrix moths

Paramesiodes is a genus of moths belonging to the subfamily Tortricinae of the family Tortricidae. The genus was erected by Alexey Diakonoff in 1960.

== Species ==
- Paramesiodes albescens (Meyrick, 1912)
- Paramesiodes aprepta Bradley, 1965
- Paramesiodes chloradelpha (Meyrick, 1912)
- Paramesiodes geraeas (Meyrick, 1909)
- Paramesiodes longirostris Diakonoff, 1960
- Paramesiodes minor Diakonoff, 1960
- Paramesiodes temulenta (Meyrick, 1912)

== See also ==
- List of Tortricidae genera
