= Algoforma =

Scientific classification
- Kingdom: Animalia
- Phylum: Arthropoda
- Class: Insecta
- Order: Lepidoptera
- Family: Tortricidae
- Tribe: Tortricini
- Genus: Algoforma; Razowski, 2005

Genus of tortrix moths

Algoforma is a genus of moths of the family Tortricidae.

== Species ==
- Algoforma algoana (Felder & Rogenhofer, 1875)
- Algoforma paralgoana Razowski, 2005

== See also ==
- List of Tortricidae genera
