= Eugnosta magnificana =

Scientific classification
- Domain: Eukaryota
- Kingdom: Animalia
- Phylum: Arthropoda
- Class: Insecta
- Order: Lepidoptera
- Family: Tortricidae
- Genus: Eugnosta
- Species: E. magnificana

Binomial name
- Eugnosta magnificana (Rebel, 1914)

Synonyms
- Euxanthis magnificana Rebel, 1914; Tortrix margaritana Hubner, [1811-1813] (preocc. Haworth, 1811); Tortrix norvichiana Hubner, [1811-1813]; Tortrix (Eupecillia) norwichiana Herrich-Schaffer, 1851; Argyroptera novrvichiana Duponchel, 1846

Species of moth

Eugnosta magnificana is a species of moth of the family Tortricidae. It is found from Spain and southern France to North Macedonia, north to Hungary and east to the southern Ural Mountains, Asia Minor, Armenia, the Transcaspian area, Iran (Kandovan), Afghanistan and China (Inner Mongolia).

The wingspan is 19–29 mm. Adults are on wing from June to August.

== Subspecies ==
- Eugnosta magnificana magnificana
- Eugnosta magnificana iberica Obraztsov, 1964 (Spain)
