= Eugnosta deceptana =

Scientific classification
- Domain: Eukaryota
- Kingdom: Animalia
- Phylum: Arthropoda
- Class: Insecta
- Order: Lepidoptera
- Family: Tortricidae
- Genus: Eugnosta
- Species: E. deceptana

Binomial name
- Eugnosta deceptana (Busck, 1907)

Synonyms
- Pharmacis deceptana Busck, 1907; Carolella deceptana

Species of moth

Eugnosta deceptana is a species of moth of the family Tortricidae. It is found in southern Texas.

The wingspan is 13–16 mm. Adults have been recorded on wing from November to January, in March, May, June and August.
