= Brachiolia amblopis =

Scientific classification
- Kingdom: Animalia
- Phylum: Arthropoda
- Class: Insecta
- Order: Lepidoptera
- Family: Tortricidae
- Genus: Brachiolia
- Species: B. amblopis

Binomial name
- Brachiolia amblopis (Meyrick, 1911)

Synonyms
- Eboda amblopis Meyrick, 1911

Species of moth

Brachiolia amblopis is a species of moth of the family Tortricidae.

The wingspan 13 mm.

The forewings are polymorphic in pattern. The ground colour of this moth is light ashy grey with blackish markings.

== Distribution ==
It is known from the Comoros, Mauritius, Réunion and the Seychelles (Cosmoledo and Aldabra).
