= Doridostoma denotata =

Scientific classification
- Domain: Eukaryota
- Kingdom: Animalia
- Phylum: Arthropoda
- Class: Insecta
- Order: Lepidoptera
- Family: Tortricidae
- Genus: Doridostoma
- Species: D. denotata

Binomial name
- Doridostoma denotata Diakonoff, 1973

Species of moth

Doridostoma denotata is a species of moth of the family Tortricidae. It is found in Madagascar.
