= Eugnosta synaetera =

Scientific classification
- Kingdom: Animalia
- Phylum: Arthropoda
- Clade: Pancrustacea
- Class: Insecta
- Order: Lepidoptera
- Family: Tortricidae
- Genus: Eugnosta
- Species: E. synaetera

Binomial name
- Eugnosta synaetera Razowski & Becker, 1994

Species of moth

Eugnosta synaetera is a species of moth of the family Tortricidae. It is found in Brazil (Santa Catarina, Goias).
