= Eugnosta assecula =

Scientific classification
- Kingdom: Animalia
- Phylum: Arthropoda
- Class: Insecta
- Order: Lepidoptera
- Family: Tortricidae
- Genus: Eugnosta
- Species: E. assecula

Binomial name
- Eugnosta assecula (Meyrick, 1909)

Synonyms
- Pharmacis assecula Meyrick, 1909

Species of moth

Eugnosta assecula is a species of moth of the family Tortricidae. It is found in South Africa.
