= Hectaphelia metapyrrha =

Scientific classification
- Kingdom: Animalia
- Phylum: Arthropoda
- Class: Insecta
- Order: Lepidoptera
- Family: Tortricidae
- Genus: Hectaphelia
- Species: H. metapyrrha

Binomial name
- Hectaphelia metapyrrha (Meyrick, 1918)

Synonyms
- Tortrix metapyrrha Meyrick, 1918

Species of moth

Hectaphelia metapyrrha is a species of moth of the family Tortricidae. It is found in South Africa.
