= Cosmorrhyncha microcosma =

Scientific classification
- Kingdom: Animalia
- Phylum: Arthropoda
- Clade: Pancrustacea
- Class: Insecta
- Order: Lepidoptera
- Family: Tortricidae
- Genus: Cosmorrhyncha
- Species: C. microcosma

Binomial name
- Cosmorrhyncha microcosma Aarvik, 2004

Species of moth

Cosmorrhyncha microcosma is a species of moth of the family Tortricidae. It is found in the Democratic Republic of Congo, Ethiopia, Ghana, Kenya, South Africa, São Tomé & Principe and Uganda.
