= Tuckia zuluana =

Scientific classification
- Kingdom: Animalia
- Phylum: Arthropoda
- Class: Insecta
- Order: Lepidoptera
- Family: Tortricidae
- Genus: Tuckia
- Species: T. zuluana

Binomial name
- Tuckia zuluana Razowski, 2001

Species of moth

Tuckia zuluana is a species of moth of the family Tortricidae. It is found in South Africa.
