= Tuckia africana =

Scientific classification
- Domain: Eukaryota
- Kingdom: Animalia
- Phylum: Arthropoda
- Class: Insecta
- Order: Lepidoptera
- Family: Tortricidae
- Genus: Tuckia
- Species: T. africana

Binomial name
- Tuckia africana (Walsingham, 1881)

Synonyms
- Conchylis africana Walsingham, 1881; Tortrix africana

Species of moth

Tuckia africana is a species of moth of the family Tortricidae. It is found in South Africa (KwaZulu-Natal, Gauteng) and Zimbabwe.
