= Metamesia elegans =

Scientific classification
- Domain: Eukaryota
- Kingdom: Animalia
- Phylum: Arthropoda
- Class: Insecta
- Order: Lepidoptera
- Family: Tortricidae
- Genus: Metamesia
- Species: M. elegans

Binomial name
- Metamesia elegans (Walsingham, 1881)

Synonyms
- Lozotaenia elegans Walsingham, 1881; Lozotaenia elegantana Vari, 1962; Cacoecia hedrastis Meyrick, 1908; Tortrix prona Meyrick, 1911

Species of moth

Metamesia elegans is a species of moth of the family Tortricidae. It is found in the Democratic Republic of Congo, Kenya, South Africa (Gauteng, KwaZulu-Natal), Tanzania and Uganda.
