= Recaraceria carceraria =

Scientific classification
- Kingdom: Animalia
- Phylum: Arthropoda
- Class: Insecta
- Order: Lepidoptera
- Family: Tortricidae
- Genus: Recaraceria
- Species: R. carceraria

Binomial name
- Recaraceria carceraria (Meyrick, 1913)

Synonyms
- Argyroploce carceraria Meyrick, 1913; Olethreutes carceraria

Species of moth

Recaraceria carceraria is a species of moth of the family Tortricidae. It is found in South Africa.
