= Nkandla macrostoma =

Scientific classification
- Kingdom: Animalia
- Phylum: Arthropoda
- Class: Insecta
- Order: Lepidoptera
- Family: Tortricidae
- Genus: Nkandla
- Species: N. macrostoma

Binomial name
- Nkandla macrostoma (Meyrick, 1920)

Synonyms
- Cnephasia macrostoma Meyrick, 1920

Species of moth

Nkandla macrostoma is a species of moth of the family Tortricidae. It is found in Western Cape, South Africa.
