= Eugnosta replicata =

Scientific classification
- Kingdom: Animalia
- Phylum: Arthropoda
- Class: Insecta
- Order: Lepidoptera
- Family: Tortricidae
- Genus: Eugnosta
- Species: E. replicata

Binomial name
- Eugnosta replicata (Meyrick, 1913)

Synonyms
- Pharmacis replicata Meyrick, 1913

Species of moth

Eugnosta replicata is a species of moth of the family Tortricidae. It is found in South Africa.
