= Paramesiodes temulenta =

Scientific classification
- Kingdom: Animalia
- Phylum: Arthropoda
- Clade: Pancrustacea
- Class: Insecta
- Order: Lepidoptera
- Family: Tortricidae
- Genus: Paramesiodes
- Species: P. temulenta

Binomial name
- Paramesiodes temulenta (Meyrick, 1912)

Synonyms
- Cnephasia temulenta Meyrick, 1912

Species of moth

Paramesiodes temulenta is a species of moth of the family Tortricidae. It is found in South Africa.
