= Metamesia incepta =

Scientific classification
- Kingdom: Animalia
- Phylum: Arthropoda
- Class: Insecta
- Order: Lepidoptera
- Family: Tortricidae
- Genus: Metamesia
- Species: M. incepta

Binomial name
- Metamesia incepta (Meyrick, 1912)

Synonyms
- Cnephasia incepta Meyrick, 1912

Species of moth

Metamesia incepta is a species of moth of the family Tortricidae. It is found in South Africa.
