= Hectaphelia kapakoana =

Scientific classification
- Kingdom: Animalia
- Phylum: Arthropoda
- Class: Insecta
- Order: Lepidoptera
- Family: Tortricidae
- Genus: Hectaphelia
- Species: H. kapakoana

Binomial name
- Hectaphelia kapakoana Razowski, 2006

Species of moth

Hectaphelia kapakoana is a species of moth of the family Tortricidae. It is found in South Africa.

The wingspan is about 16 mm.
