= Eugnosta feriata =

Scientific classification
- Kingdom: Animalia
- Phylum: Arthropoda
- Class: Insecta
- Order: Lepidoptera
- Family: Tortricidae
- Genus: Eugnosta
- Species: E. feriata

Binomial name
- Eugnosta feriata (Meyrick, 1913)

Synonyms
- Pharmacis feriata Meyrick, 1913

Species of moth

Eugnosta feriata is a species of moth of the family Tortricidae. It is found in South Africa.
