= Nkandla (moth) =

Scientific classification
- Kingdom: Animalia
- Phylum: Arthropoda
- Class: Insecta
- Order: Lepidoptera
- Family: Tortricidae
- Tribe: Archipini
- Genus: Nkandla; Razowski & J. W. Brown, 2009

Genus of moths

Nkandla is a genus of moths belonging to the subfamily Tortricinae of the family Tortricidae. The genus was erected by Józef Razowski and John Wesley Brown in 2009.

== Species ==
- Nkandla flavisecta (Meyrick, 1918)
- Nkandla macrostoma (Meyrick, 1920)

== Etymology ==
The genus name refers to Nkandla, KwaZulu-Natal, South Africa, the collecting locality of some of the specimens.

== See also ==
- List of Tortricidae genera
