= Paramesiodes chloradelpha =

Scientific classification
- Kingdom: Animalia
- Phylum: Arthropoda
- Class: Insecta
- Order: Lepidoptera
- Family: Tortricidae
- Genus: Paramesiodes
- Species: P. chloradelpha

Binomial name
- Paramesiodes chloradelpha (Meyrick, 1912)

Synonyms
- Epichorista chloradelpha Meyrick, 1912

Species of moth

Paramesiodes chloradelpha is a species of moth of the family Tortricidae. It is found in South Africa.
