= Algoforma algoana =

Scientific classification
- Domain: Eukaryota
- Kingdom: Animalia
- Phylum: Arthropoda
- Class: Insecta
- Order: Lepidoptera
- Family: Tortricidae
- Genus: Algoforma
- Species: A. algoana

Binomial name
- Algoforma algoana (Felder & Rogenhofer, 1875)

Synonyms
- Teras algoana Felder & Rogenhofer, 1875

Species of moth

Algoforma algoana is a species of moth of the family Tortricidae. It is found in South Africa.

The wingspan is 16–18 mm. The ground colour of the forewings is grey green with a black-brown subdorsal blotch.
