= Droceta cedrota =

Scientific classification
- Kingdom: Animalia
- Phylum: Arthropoda
- Class: Insecta
- Order: Lepidoptera
- Family: Tortricidae
- Genus: Droceta
- Species: D. cedrota

Binomial name
- Droceta cedrota (Meyrick, 1908)

Synonyms
- Tortrix cedrota Meyrick, 1908; Cnephasia cedrota

Species of moth

Droceta cedrota is a species of moth of the family Tortricidae. It is found in Gauteng, South Africa.
