= Doridostoma symplecta =

Scientific classification
- Kingdom: Animalia
- Phylum: Arthropoda
- Class: Insecta
- Order: Lepidoptera
- Family: Tortricidae
- Genus: Doridostoma
- Species: D. symplecta

Binomial name
- Doridostoma symplecta (Meyrick, 1910)

Synonyms
- Tortrix symplecta Meyrick, 1910

Species of moth

Doridostoma symplecta is a species of moth of the family Tortricidae. It is found in Mpumalanga, South Africa.
