= Eugnosta niveicaput =

Scientific classification
- Kingdom: Animalia
- Phylum: Arthropoda
- Class: Insecta
- Order: Lepidoptera
- Family: Tortricidae
- Genus: Eugnosta
- Species: E. niveicaput

Binomial name
- Eugnosta niveicaput Razowski, 2005

Species of moth

Eugnosta niveicaput is a species of moth of the family Tortricidae. It is found in South Africa.
