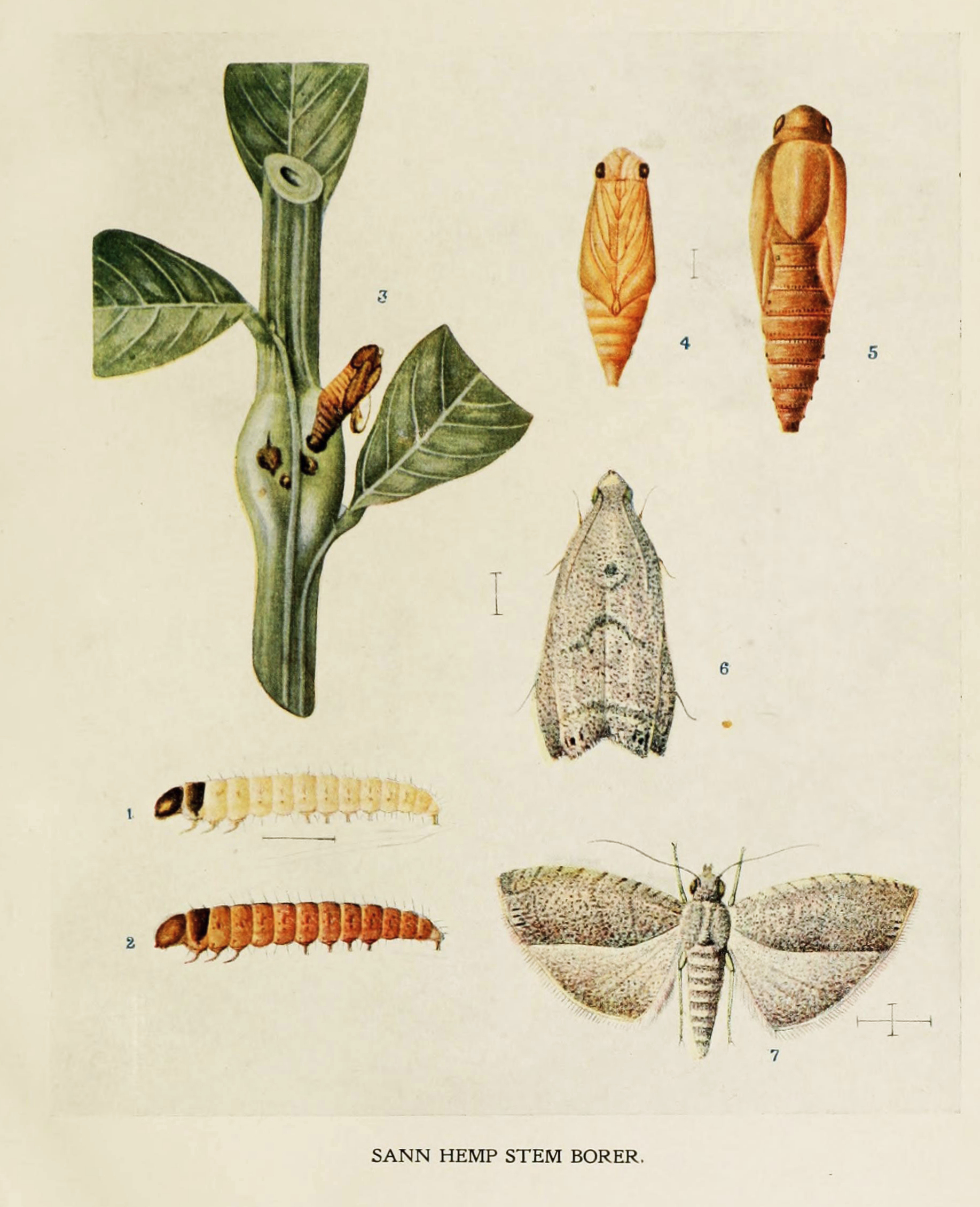

Scientific classification
- Kingdom: Animalia
- Phylum: Arthropoda
- Class: Insecta
- Order: Lepidoptera
- Family: Tortricidae
- Genus: Fulcrifera
- Species: F. tricentra

Binomial name
- Fulcrifera tricentra (Meyrick, 1907)

Synonyms
- Laspeyresia tricentra Meyrick, 1907; Laspeyresia crocopa Meyrick, 1907; Laspeyresia pseudonectis Meyrick, 1907

= Fulcrifera tricentra =

Species of moth

Fulcrifera tricentra is a moth of the family Tortricidae first described by Edward Meyrick in 1907. It is found in India, Sri Lanka, Indonesia (Java) and probably also China. It has also been reported from South Africa, but this seems doubtful.

The wingspan is 10–13 mm.

The larvae feed on Crotalaria juncea, Phaseolus mungo, Dolichos lablab, Dolichos biflorus and Tephrosia purpurea.
