= Nkandla flavisecta =

Scientific classification
- Kingdom: Animalia
- Phylum: Arthropoda
- Class: Insecta
- Order: Lepidoptera
- Family: Tortricidae
- Genus: Nkandla
- Species: N. flavisecta

Binomial name
- Nkandla flavisecta (Meyrick, 1918)

Synonyms
- Cnephasia flavisecta Meyrick, 1918

Species of moth

Nkandla flavisecta is a species of moth of the family Tortricidae. It is found in South Africa, where it has been recorded from KwaZulu-Natal at altitudes of about 1,100 meters.

The length of the forewings is 4-4.5 mm. Adults have been recorded on wing in January and March.
