= Goniotorna pleuroptila =

Scientific classification
- Domain: Eukaryota
- Kingdom: Animalia
- Phylum: Arthropoda
- Class: Insecta
- Order: Lepidoptera
- Family: Tortricidae
- Genus: Goniotorna
- Species: G. pleuroptila

Binomial name
- Goniotorna pleuroptila (Meyrick, 1937)

Synonyms
- Tortrix pleuroptila Meyrick, 1937

Species of moth

Goniotorna pleuroptila is a species of moth of the family Tortricidae. It is found in South Africa.
