= Orilesa olearis =

Scientific classification
- Kingdom: Animalia
- Phylum: Arthropoda
- Class: Insecta
- Order: Lepidoptera
- Family: Tortricidae
- Genus: Orilesa
- Species: O. olearis

Binomial name
- Orilesa olearis (Meyrick, 1912)

Synonyms
- Cnephasia olearis Meyrick, 1912

Species of moth

Orilesa olearis is a species of moth of the family Tortricidae. It is found in South Africa and Swaziland.
