= Eugnosta umbraculata =

Scientific classification
- Kingdom: Animalia
- Phylum: Arthropoda
- Class: Insecta
- Order: Lepidoptera
- Family: Tortricidae
- Genus: Eugnosta
- Species: E. umbraculata

Binomial name
- Eugnosta umbraculata (Meyrick, 1918)

Synonyms
- Euxanthis umbraculata Meyrick, 1918

Species of moth

Eugnosta umbraculata is a species of moth of the family Tortricidae. It is found in South Africa.
