= Eugnosta lukaszi =

Scientific classification
- Kingdom: Animalia
- Phylum: Arthropoda
- Clade: Pancrustacea
- Class: Insecta
- Order: Lepidoptera
- Family: Tortricidae
- Genus: Eugnosta
- Species: E. lukaszi

Binomial name
- Eugnosta lukaszi Razowski, 2005

Species of moth

Eugnosta lukaszi is a species of moth of the family Tortricidae. It is found in South Africa.
