= Hectaphelia hectaea =

Scientific classification
- Kingdom: Animalia
- Phylum: Arthropoda
- Clade: Pancrustacea
- Class: Insecta
- Order: Lepidoptera
- Family: Tortricidae
- Genus: Hectaphelia
- Species: H. hectaea

Binomial name
- Hectaphelia hectaea (Meyrick, 1911)

Synonyms
- Argyrotoxa hectaea Meyrick, 1911

Species of moth

Hectaphelia hectaea is a species of moth of the family Tortricidae. It is found in South Africa.
