= Eugnosta dives =

Scientific classification
- Domain: Eukaryota
- Kingdom: Animalia
- Phylum: Arthropoda
- Class: Insecta
- Order: Lepidoptera
- Family: Tortricidae
- Genus: Eugnosta
- Species: E. dives

Binomial name
- Eugnosta dives (Butler, 1878)

Synonyms
- Conchylis dives Butler, 1878; Safra metaphaeella Walker, 1863; Euxanthis simplicella Meyrick, in Caradja & Meyrick, 1935; Euxanthis dives ab. simpliciana Kennel, 1913

Species of moth

Eugnosta dives is a species of moth of the family Tortricidae. It is found in China (Heilongjiang, Inner Mongolia, Jiangsu, Jilin, Liaoning, Ningxia, Shaanxi, Shandong), Japan and Russia.

Adults are shining white, the forewings thinly and minutely black-speckled, pale luteous along most of the costa, and with an irregular pale luteous discal stripe. The hindwings are brown, with an aeneous tinge.
