= Afroploce karsholti =

Scientific classification
- Domain: Eukaryota
- Kingdom: Animalia
- Phylum: Arthropoda
- Class: Insecta
- Order: Lepidoptera
- Family: Tortricidae
- Genus: Afroploce
- Species: A. karsholti

Binomial name
- Afroploce karsholti Aarvik, 2004

Species of moth

Afroploce karsholti is a species of moth of the family Tortricidae. It is found in the Democratic Republic of Congo, Ghana, Kenya, Malawi, Mozambique, Nigeria, South Africa and Tanzania.
