= Eugnosta anxifera =

Scientific classification
- Kingdom: Animalia
- Phylum: Arthropoda
- Class: Insecta
- Order: Lepidoptera
- Family: Tortricidae
- Genus: Eugnosta
- Species: E. anxifera

Binomial name
- Eugnosta anxifera Razowski, 1993

Species of moth

Eugnosta anxifera is a species of moth of the family Tortricidae. It is found in South Africa.
