= Hectaphelia tortuosa =

Scientific classification
- Kingdom: Animalia
- Phylum: Arthropoda
- Class: Insecta
- Order: Lepidoptera
- Family: Tortricidae
- Genus: Hectaphelia
- Species: H. tortuosa

Binomial name
- Hectaphelia tortuosa (Meyrick, 1912)

Synonyms
- Epichorista tortuosa Meyrick, 1912

Species of moth

Hectaphelia tortuosa is a species of moth of the family Tortricidae. It is found in South Africa.
