= Cnephasia chlorocrossa =

Scientific classification
- Kingdom: Animalia
- Phylum: Arthropoda
- Clade: Pancrustacea
- Class: Insecta
- Order: Lepidoptera
- Family: Tortricidae
- Genus: Cnephasia
- Species: C. chlorocrossa

Binomial name
- Cnephasia chlorocrossa Meyrick, 1926

Species of moth

”Cnephasia” chlorocrossa is a species of moth of the family Tortricidae. It is found in South Africa (Western Cape).
