= Paramesiodes geraeas =

Scientific classification
- Kingdom: Animalia
- Phylum: Arthropoda
- Class: Insecta
- Order: Lepidoptera
- Family: Tortricidae
- Genus: Paramesiodes
- Species: P. geraeas

Binomial name
- Paramesiodes geraeas (Meyrick, 1909)

Synonyms
- Epichorista geraeas Meyrick, 1909

Species of moth

Paramesiodes geraeas is a species of moth of the family Tortricidae. It is found in South Africa, where it has been recorded from Gauteng.
