= Eugnosta vecorda =

Scientific classification
- Kingdom: Animalia
- Phylum: Arthropoda
- Class: Insecta
- Order: Lepidoptera
- Family: Tortricidae
- Genus: Eugnosta
- Species: E. vecorda

Binomial name
- Eugnosta vecorda Razowski, 1993

Species of moth

Eugnosta vecorda is a species of moth of the family Tortricidae. It is found in South Africa.
