= Fulcrifera periculosa =

Scientific classification
- Kingdom: Animalia
- Phylum: Arthropoda
- Class: Insecta
- Order: Lepidoptera
- Family: Tortricidae
- Genus: Fulcrifera
- Species: F. periculosa

Binomial name
- Fulcrifera periculosa (Meyrick, 1913)

Synonyms
- Laspeyresia periculosa Meyrick, 1913; Laspeyresia cynicopis Meyrick, 1939; Fulcrifera cynicopis

Species of moth

Fulcrifera periculosa is a species of moth of the family Tortricidae. It is found in the Democratic Republic of Congo, Kenya and South Africa.
