= Hectaphelia periculosa =

Scientific classification
- Kingdom: Animalia
- Phylum: Arthropoda
- Class: Insecta
- Order: Lepidoptera
- Family: Tortricidae
- Genus: Hectaphelia
- Species: H. periculosa

Binomial name
- Hectaphelia periculosa Razowski, 2006

Species of moth

Hectaphelia periculosa is a species of moth of the family Tortricidae. It is found in South Africa.

The wingspan is about 15 mm.
