= Brachiolia obscurana =

Scientific classification
- Kingdom: Animalia
- Phylum: Arthropoda
- Class: Insecta
- Order: Lepidoptera
- Family: Tortricidae
- Genus: Brachiolia
- Species: B. obscurana

Binomial name
- Brachiolia obscurana Razowski, 1966

Species of moth

Brachiolia obscurana is a species of moth of the family Tortricidae. It is found in South Africa.
