= Paramesiodes albescens =

Scientific classification
- Kingdom: Animalia
- Phylum: Arthropoda
- Class: Insecta
- Order: Lepidoptera
- Family: Tortricidae
- Genus: Paramesiodes
- Species: P. albescens

Binomial name
- Paramesiodes albescens (Meyrick, 1912)

Synonyms
- Tortrix albescens Meyrick, 1912

Species of moth

Paramesiodes albescens is a species of moth of the family Tortricidae. It is found in South Africa.
