= Eugnosta trimeni =

Scientific classification
- Domain: Eukaryota
- Kingdom: Animalia
- Phylum: Arthropoda
- Class: Insecta
- Order: Lepidoptera
- Family: Tortricidae
- Genus: Eugnosta
- Species: E. trimeni

Binomial name
- Eugnosta trimeni (Felder & Rogenhofer, 1875)

Synonyms
- Conchylis trimeni Felder & Rogenhofer, 1875; Conchylis trimeni f. minor Felder & Rogenhofer, 1875

Species of moth

Eugnosta trimeni is a species of moth of the family Tortricidae. It is found in Lesotho, Mozambique and South Africa.
