= Brachiolia egenella =

Scientific classification
- Kingdom: Animalia
- Phylum: Arthropoda
- Class: Insecta
- Order: Lepidoptera
- Family: Tortricidae
- Genus: Brachiolia
- Species: B. egenella

Binomial name
- Brachiolia egenella (Walker, 1864)

Synonyms
- Tinea egenella Walker, 1864; Eboda obstinata Meyrick, 1908

Species of moth

Brachiolia egenella is a species of moth of the family Tortricidae first described by Francis Walker in 1864. It is found in Sri Lanka, India, South Africa and on the Comoros and Mauritius.

The larvae feed on Cardiospermum species, feeding from within the rolled leaves of their host plant. Full-grown larvae reach a length of about 11 mm.
