= Promodra nigrata =

Scientific classification
- Kingdom: Animalia
- Phylum: Arthropoda
- Clade: Pancrustacea
- Class: Insecta
- Order: Lepidoptera
- Family: Tortricidae
- Genus: Promodra
- Species: P. nigrata

Binomial name
- Promodra nigrata Razowski, 2008

Species of moth

Promodra nigrata is a species of moth in the family Tortricidae. The species was described by Razowski in 2008. It is found in South Africa.
