= Eugnosta hydrargyrana =

Scientific classification
- Domain: Eukaryota
- Kingdom: Animalia
- Phylum: Arthropoda
- Class: Insecta
- Order: Lepidoptera
- Family: Tortricidae
- Genus: Eugnosta
- Species: E. hydrargyrana

Binomial name
- Eugnosta hydrargyrana (Eversmann, 1842)

Synonyms
- Tortrix hydrargyrana Eversmann, 1842; Conchylis anargyrana Ragonot, 1894; Tortrix insequana Eversmann, 1844; Argyroptera mercuriana Guenee, 1845

Species of moth

Eugnosta hydrargyrana is a species of moth of the family Tortricidae. It is found in Mongolia, China (Beijing, Heilongjiang, Shaanxi, Shandong), Russia (Ural Mountains), Kazakhstan, Uzbekistan and Afghanistan (the western Pamir Mountains).

The wingspan is 27–29 mm. Adults are on wing from May to July.

== Subspecies ==
- Eugnosta hydrargyrana hydrargyrana
- Eugnosta hydrargyrana mongolica Razowski, 1970 (Mongolia, China: Beijing, Heilongjiang, Shaanxi, Shandong)
