= Hectaphelia mensaria =

Scientific classification
- Kingdom: Animalia
- Phylum: Arthropoda
- Class: Insecta
- Order: Lepidoptera
- Family: Tortricidae
- Genus: Hectaphelia
- Species: H. mensaria

Binomial name
- Hectaphelia mensaria (Meyrick, 1912)

Synonyms
- Tortrix mensaria Meyrick, 1912

Species of moth

Hectaphelia mensaria is a species of moth of the family Tortricidae. It is found in KwaZulu-Natal, South Africa.
