= Hectaphelia vestigialis =

Scientific classification
- Kingdom: Animalia
- Phylum: Arthropoda
- Class: Insecta
- Order: Lepidoptera
- Family: Tortricidae
- Genus: Hectaphelia
- Species: H. vestigialis

Binomial name
- Hectaphelia vestigialis (Meyrick, 1914)

Synonyms
- Epichorista vestigialis Meyrick, 1914

Species of moth

Hectaphelia vestigialis is a species of moth of the family Tortricidae. It is found in Mpumalanga, South Africa.
