= Algoforma paralgoana =

Scientific classification
- Domain: Eukaryota
- Kingdom: Animalia
- Phylum: Arthropoda
- Class: Insecta
- Order: Lepidoptera
- Family: Tortricidae
- Genus: Algoforma
- Species: A. paralgoana

Binomial name
- Algoforma paralgoana Razowski, 2005

Synonyms
- Algoforma paralogoana Razowski, 2005

Species of moth

Algoforma paralgoana is a species of moth of the family Tortricidae. It is found in South Africa.

The larvae feed on Allophylus species.
