= Hectaphelia sporadias =

Scientific classification
- Kingdom: Animalia
- Phylum: Arthropoda
- Class: Insecta
- Order: Lepidoptera
- Family: Tortricidae
- Genus: Hectaphelia
- Species: H. sporadias

Binomial name
- Hectaphelia sporadias (Meyrick, 1920)

Synonyms
- Tortrix sporadias Meyrick, 1920

Species of moth

Hectaphelia sporadias is a species of moth of the family Tortricidae. It is found in Northern Cape, South Africa.
