= Metamesia designata =

Scientific classification
- Kingdom: Animalia
- Phylum: Arthropoda
- Clade: Pancrustacea
- Class: Insecta
- Order: Lepidoptera
- Family: Tortricidae
- Genus: Metamesia
- Species: M. designata

Binomial name
- Metamesia designata (Meyrick, 1921)

Synonyms
- Cnephasia designata Meyrick, 1921

Species of moth

Metamesia designata is a species of moth of the family Tortricidae. It is found in South Africa.
