= Eugnosta misella =

Scientific classification
- Kingdom: Animalia
- Phylum: Arthropoda
- Class: Insecta
- Order: Lepidoptera
- Family: Tortricidae
- Genus: Eugnosta
- Species: E. misella

Binomial name
- Eugnosta misella Razowski, 1993

Species of moth

Eugnosta misella is a species of moth of the family Tortricidae. It is found in Kenya, Tanzania and South Africa.

The wingspan is 9–11 mm.
