= Hectaphelia pharetrata =

Scientific classification
- Kingdom: Animalia
- Phylum: Arthropoda
- Class: Insecta
- Order: Lepidoptera
- Family: Tortricidae
- Genus: Hectaphelia
- Species: H. pharetrata

Binomial name
- Hectaphelia pharetrata (Meyrick, 1909)

Synonyms
- Tortrix pharetrata Meyrick, 1909

Species of moth

Hectaphelia pharetrata is a species of moth of the family Tortricidae. It is found in Gauteng, South Africa.
