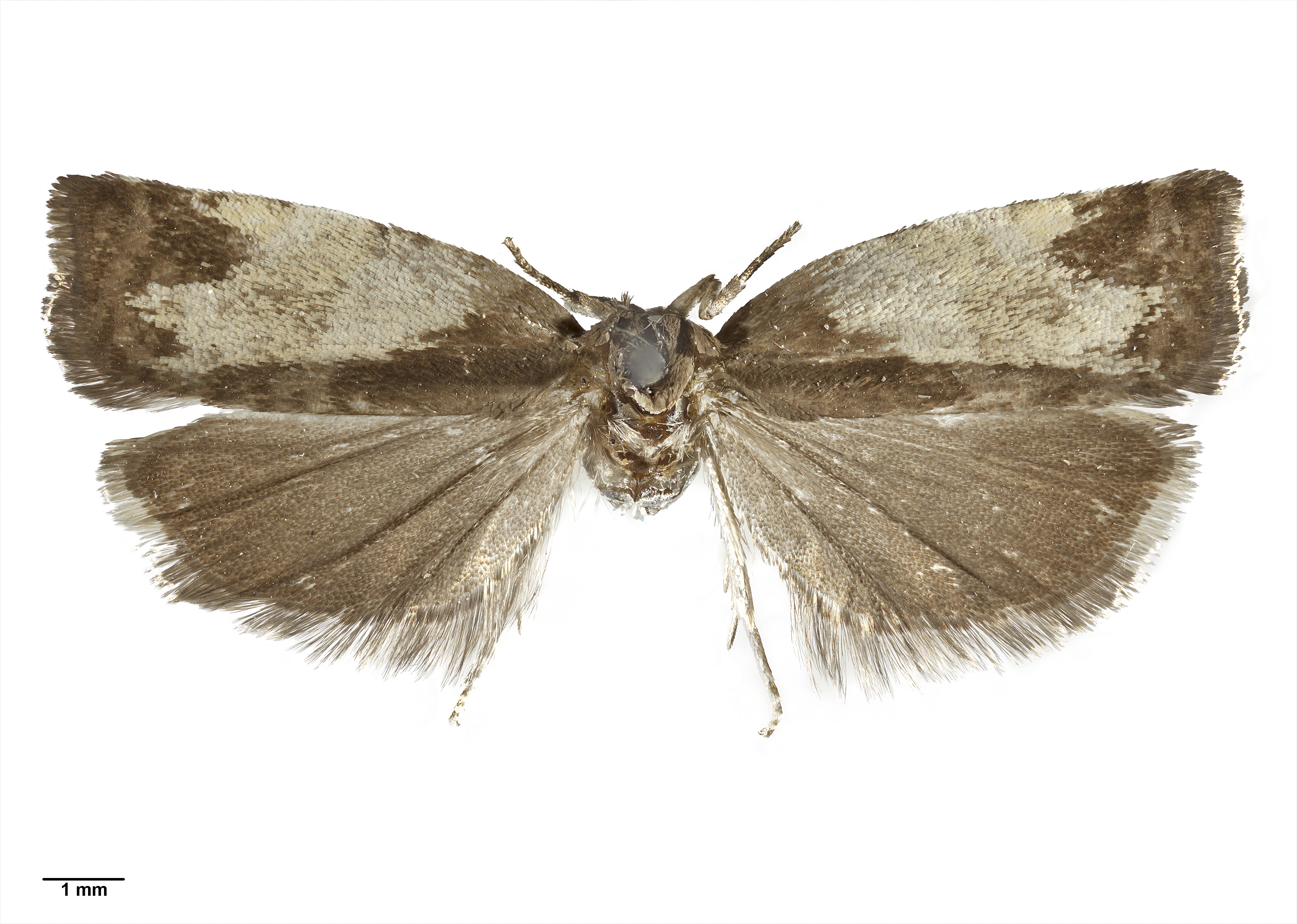
- Epichorista emphanes

Scientific classification
- Domain: Eukaryota
- Kingdom: Animalia
- Phylum: Arthropoda
- Class: Insecta
- Order: Lepidoptera
- Family: Tortricidae
- Tribe: Archipini
- Genus: Epichorista; Meyrick, 1909

= Epichorista =

Genus of tortrix moths

Epichorista is a genus of moths belonging to the subfamily Tortricinae of the family Tortricidae. It was first described by Edward Meyrick in 1909. The type species is Epichorista hemionana.

== Species ==
- Epichorista abdita Philpott, 1924
- Epichorista aethocoma Meyrick, 1923
- Epichorista allogama (Meyrick, 1914)
- Epichorista armigera Diakonoff, 1956
- Epichorista aspistana (Meyrick, 1882)
- Epichorista benevola Meyrick, 1920
- Epichorista crypsidora (Meyrick, 1909)
- Epichorista elephantina (Meyrick, 1885)
- Epichorista emphanes (Meyrick, 1901)
- Epichorista eribola (Meyrick, 1889)
- Epichorista fraudulenta (Philpott, 1928)
- Epichorista hemionana (Meyrick, 1883)
- Epichorista lindsayi Philpott, 1928
- Epichorista mesosceptra Meyrick, 1920
- Epichorista mimica Philpott, 1930
- Epichorista passaleuta Meyrick, 1920
- Epichorista perversa Meyrick, 1912
- Epichorista phaeocoma Meyrick, 1914
- Epichorista prodigiosa Meyrick, 1920
- Epichorista psoropis Meyrick, 1920
- Epichorista samata Diakonoff, 1941
- Epichorista sicca Meyrick, 1912
- Epichorista siriana (Meyrick, 1881)
- Epichorista tenebrosa Philpott, 1917
- Epichorista zatrophana (Meyrick, 1882)

== Former species ==
- Epichorista cinerata Meyrick, 1920
- Epichorista chloradelpha Meyrick, 1912
- Epichorista exanimata Meyrick, 1920
- Epichorista geraeas Meyrick, 1909
- Epichorista niphosema Meyrick, 1917
- Epichorista phalaraea Meyrick, 1920
- Epichorista vestigialis Meyrick, 1914

== See also ==
- List of Tortricidae genera
