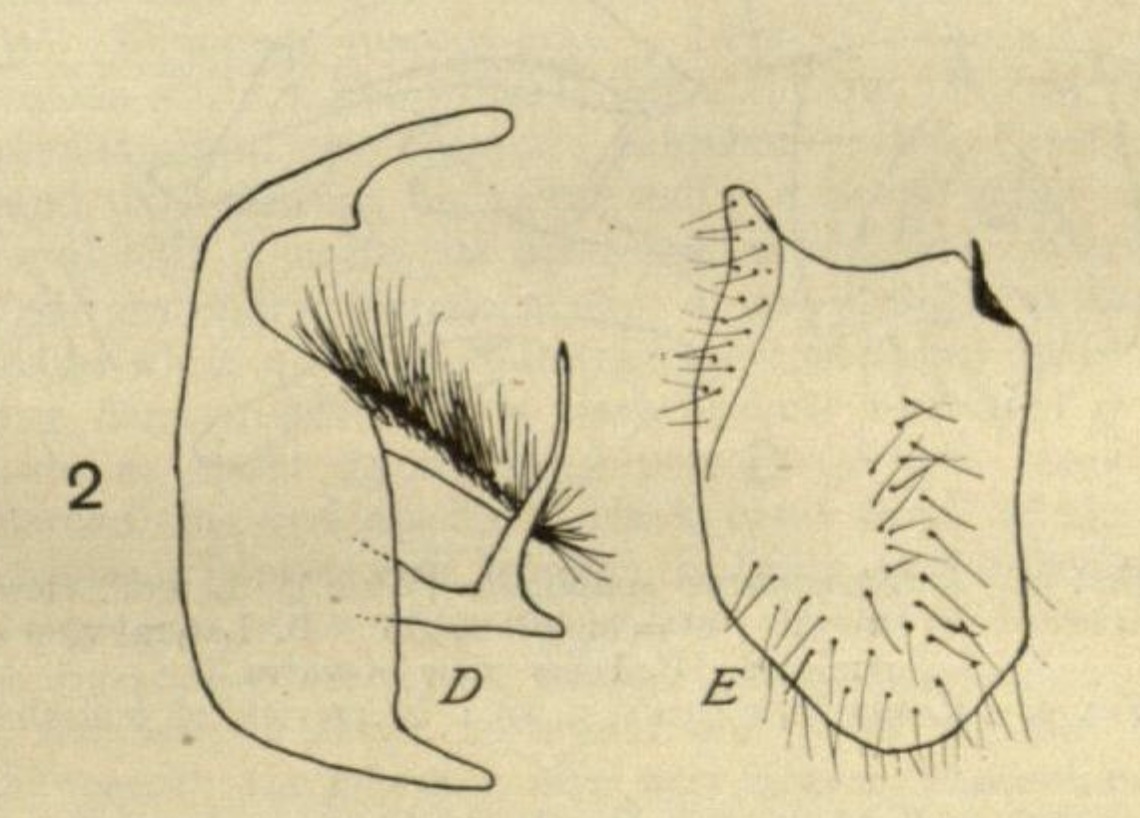
- Illustration of genitalia of the male and female of E. abdita.

Scientific classification
- Kingdom: Animalia
- Phylum: Arthropoda
- Class: Insecta
- Order: Lepidoptera
- Family: Tortricidae
- Genus: Epichorista
- Species: E. abdita

Binomial name
- Epichorista abdita Philpott, 1924

= Epichorista abdita =

Species of moth endemic to New Zealand

Epichorista abdita is a species of moth in the family Tortricidae. This species was first described by Alfred Philpott in 1924. It is endemic to New Zealand.

== Taxonomy ==
This species was first described by Alfred Philpott in 1924 using specimens collected on the Mount Arthur tableland in the first week of March. In 1928 George Hudson discussed E. abdita in his book The butterflies and moths of New Zealand discussing it as a form of Epichorista emphanes. In 1928 Alfred Philpott also discussed and illustrated the male genitalia of this species treating the moth as a distinct species. In another 1928 article Philpott pointed out that the male genitalia of E. abdita showed "markedly different structural peculiarities". In 1939 Hudson again discussed E. abdita this time as a synonym of E. emphanes in his publication in A supplement to the butterflies and moths of New Zealand. John S. Dugdale discussed this moth as a species in his 1988 publication. However as at 2025, this species is regarded as being taxonomically unresolved as it likely belongs to another genus. It is therefore also known as Epichorista (s.l.) abdita. The male holotype specimen is held at the New Zealand Arthropod Collection.

== Description ==
Philpott described this species as follows:

♂. 11 1/2–13 mm. Head, palpi, and thorax bright reddish-ochreous. Antennae in male ciliated, 1 1/2. Abdomen dark fuscous. Legs ochreous-whitish, tarsal segments annulated with fuscous. Forewings, costa strongly arched at base, apex rectangular, termen very slightly oblique, rounded beneath; bright ochreous-reddish; markings very obscure; five or six fuscous dots on basal half of costa; traces of some leaden-white fasciae at 1/3 apical half of wing with numerous obscure waved leaden-white fasciae, visible only under magnification; central fascia indicated by a clear reddish area on costa at middle: fringes ochreous-reddish, tips paler. Hindwings dark fuscous: fringes greyish-fuscous, with basal band and the tips round termen tinged with ochreous.

In one example the markings are quite obsolete and the ground-colour is much paler. It is a smaller and duller species than the similar in appearance E. emphanes and also has longer antennal ciliations.

== Distribution ==
This species is endemic to New Zealand. It has been observed in the Mount Arthur tableland.

== Behaviour ==
The adults of this species are on the wing in March.
