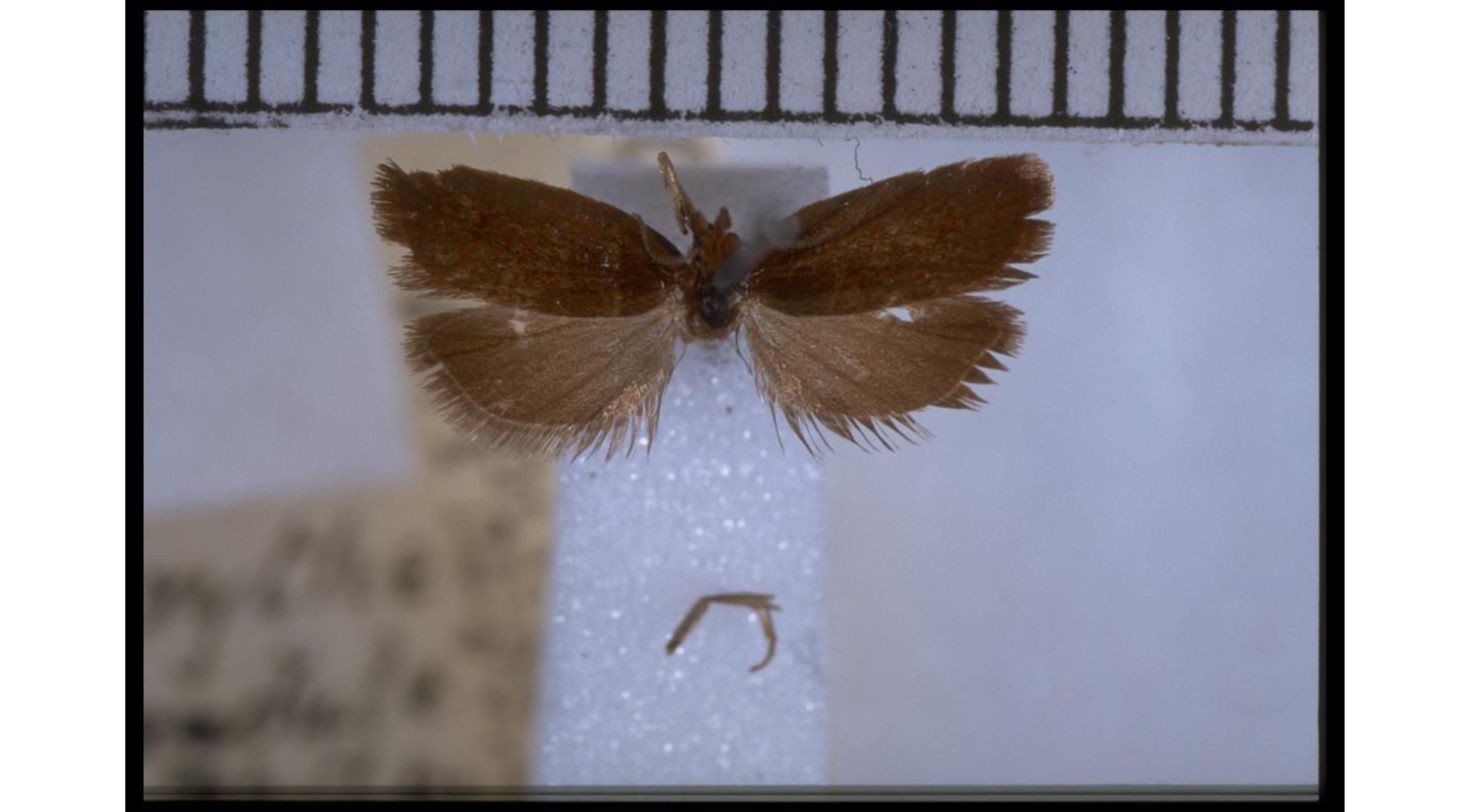
- Male holotype

Scientific classification
- Kingdom: Animalia
- Phylum: Arthropoda
- Class: Insecta
- Order: Lepidoptera
- Family: Tortricidae
- Genus: Epichorista
- Species: E. fraudulenta

Binomial name
- Epichorista fraudulenta (Philpott, 1928)

Synonyms
- Eurythecta fraudulenta Philpott, 1928

= Epichorista fraudulenta =

Species of moth endemic to New Zealand

Epichorista fraudulenta is a species of moth of the family Tortricidae. This species was first described by Alfred Philpott in 1928. It is endemic to New Zealand and has been observed in the Arthur Range. This species is superficially very similar to Epichorista emphhanes. The female moth is extremely variable. Adults are on the wing in February and March.

== Taxonomy ==
This species was first described by Alfred Philpott using specimens collected by Philpott in February and March at Gordon's Pyramid and at the Mount Arthur Tableland in the Arthur Range in 1928. It was originally named Eurythecta fraudulenta. Later in 1928 Philpott placed this species in the genus Epichorista. George Hudson discussed this species as a synonym of Epichorista emphanes in his 1939 book A supplement to the butterflies and moths of New Zealand. This species is regarded as being taxonomically unresolved as it likely belongs to another genus. It is therefore also known as Epichorista (s.l.) emphanes. The male holotype specimen, collected at Mount Arthur, is held at the New Zealand Arthropod Collection.

== Description ==
Philpott described this species as follows:

♂. 11–14 mm. Head and palpi dark brown mixed with ferruginous or red. Antennae brown mixed with grey, ciliations over one. Thorax dark brown, sometimes mixed with reddish. Abdomen and legs dark brown. Forewings, costa strongly arched at base, apex rectangular, termen moderately rounded, slightly oblique; dark slaty brown strigulated throughout with ferruginous or red; fringes slate colour, basal half reddish. Hindwings greyish-fuscous: fringes greyish-fuscous with dark basal line. ♀. Head and thorax brown, ochreous or ferruginous. Forewings usually brown mixed with yellow, ferruginous or reddish; margin of basal patch very oblique, reaching dorsum at about ½; a broad, fairly even paler fascia following basal patch, usually lead-coloured, sometimes whitish, frequently obscure; a short white outwardly oblique fascia from costa at 3/5, frequently bent at middle and continued in lead-colour to before tornus, sometimes forming part of a subtriangular patch on costa before apex: fringes a mixture of the wing colours. Hindwings fuscous: fringes fuscous with dark basal line, round apex ochreous-whitish.

Philpott pointed out that E. fraudulenta is superficially very similar to Epichorista emphhanes. The female is extremely variable with one example having the first and second fasciae united and forming a broad white band across the wing.

== Distribution ==
E. fraudulenta is endemic to New Zealand and is found in the Arthur Range in the Tasman District and West Coast Region.

== Behaviour ==
Adults of this species are on the wing in February and March.
