= Epichoristodes panochra =

Scientific classification
- Kingdom: Animalia
- Phylum: Arthropoda
- Class: Insecta
- Order: Lepidoptera
- Family: Tortricidae
- Genus: Epichoristodes
- Species: E. panochra

Binomial name
- Epichoristodes panochra Bradley, 1965

Species of moth

Epichoristodes panochra is a species of moth of the family Tortricidae. It is found in Uganda.
