= Epichoristodes atricaput =

Scientific classification
- Kingdom: Animalia
- Phylum: Arthropoda
- Class: Insecta
- Order: Lepidoptera
- Family: Tortricidae
- Genus: Epichoristodes
- Species: E. atricaput

Binomial name
- Epichoristodes atricaput Diakonoff, 1973

Species of moth

Epichoristodes atricaput is a species of moth of the family Tortricidae. It is found in Madagascar.
