= Epichorista mesosceptra =

Scientific classification
- Kingdom: Animalia
- Phylum: Arthropoda
- Class: Insecta
- Order: Lepidoptera
- Family: Tortricidae
- Genus: Epichorista
- Species: E. mesosceptra

Binomial name
- Epichorista mesosceptra Meyrick, 1920

Species of moth

Epichorista mesosceptra is a species of moth of the family Tortricidae. It is found in Kenya.
