= Epichorista prodigiosa =

Scientific classification
- Kingdom: Animalia
- Phylum: Arthropoda
- Class: Insecta
- Order: Lepidoptera
- Family: Tortricidae
- Genus: Epichorista
- Species: E. prodigiosa

Binomial name
- Epichorista prodigiosa Meyrick, 1920

Species of moth

Epichorista prodigiosa is a species of moth belonging to the family Tortricidae, commonly known as leafroller moths. It is endemic to Kenya, though detailed information on its exact distribution within the country is limited. The Tortricidae family includes many species known for their leaf-rolling behavior during the larval stage, where they use rolled or folded leaves for protection. While some Tortricidae species in the Afrotropical region (including Kenya) inhabit plants like acacia, there is no specific evidence that Epichorista prodigiosa is directly associated with acacia trees.
