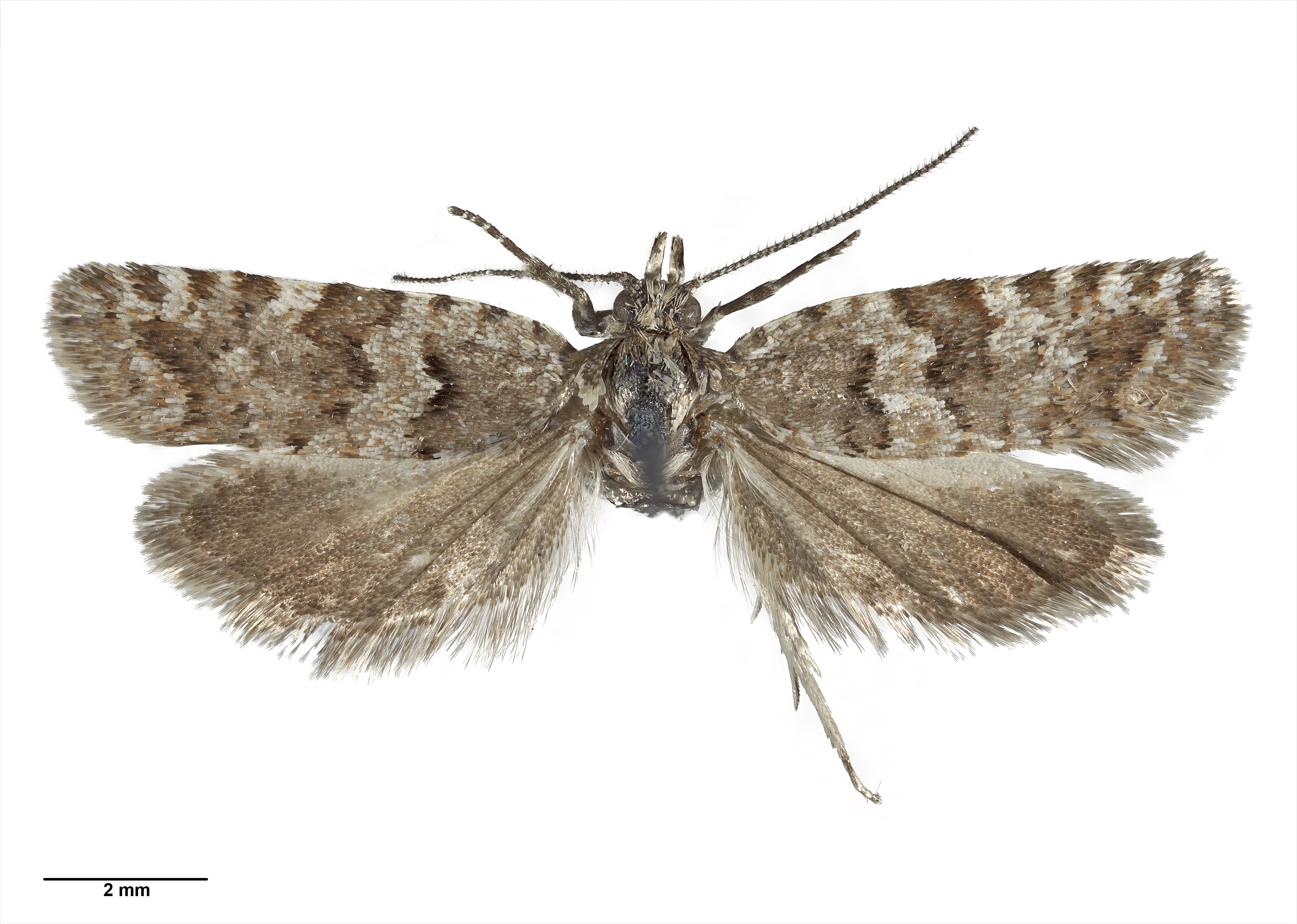
- Male holotype specimen

Scientific classification
- Domain: Eukaryota
- Kingdom: Animalia
- Phylum: Arthropoda
- Class: Insecta
- Order: Lepidoptera
- Family: Tortricidae
- Genus: Epichorista
- Species: E. mimica

Binomial name
- Epichorista mimica Philpott, 1930

= Epichorista mimica =

Species of moth endemic to New Zealand

Epichorista mimica is a species of moth of the family Tortricidae. This species was first described by Alfred Philpott in 1930. It is endemic to New Zealand and is found in the Ida Range in Otago. This species is regarded as being rare. Adults are on the wing in February.

== Taxonomy ==
E. mimica was first described by Alfred Philpott in 1930 using two specimens collected by Charles E. Clarke at Mount Ida, in the Ida Range in Central Otago, in February. George Hudson discussed and illustrated the species in his 1939 publication A supplement to the butterflies and moths of New Zealand. This species is regarded as being taxonomically unresolved as it likely belongs to another genus. It is therefore also known as Epichorista (s.l.) mimica. The male holotype is held at the Auckland War Memorial Museum.

== Description ==
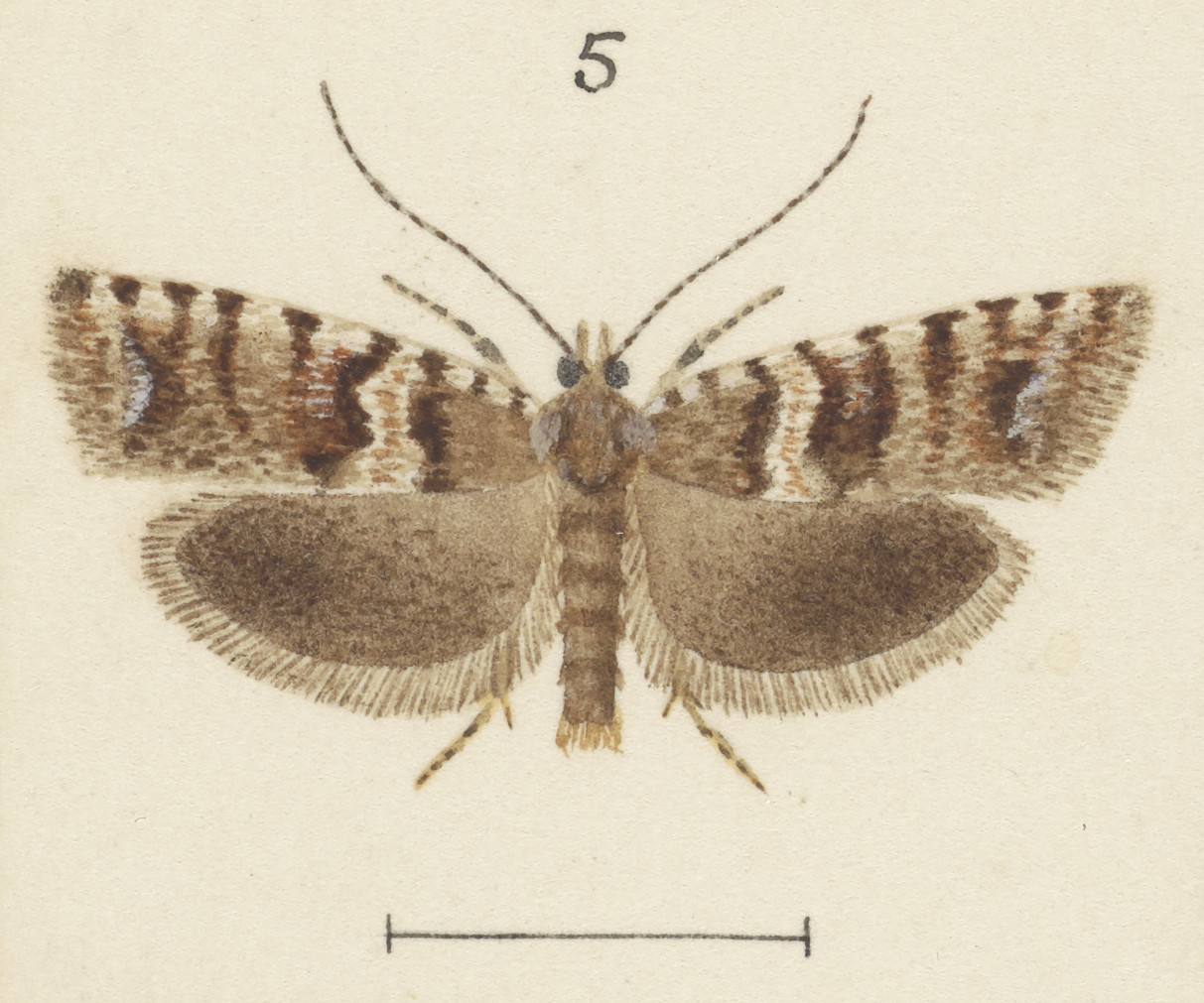
Illustration by Hudson.

Philpott described this species as follows:

♂. 14-15 mm. Head, palpi and thorax grey mixed with brown. Antennae grey annulated with black, ciliations in ♂ 1 1/2. Abdomen grey mixed with whitish ochreous. Legs ochreous, anterior pair infuscated, tarsi annulated with ochreous. Forewings elongate, suboblong, costa arched basally, thence almost straight, apex rounded, termen bowed, oblique; white, densely irrorated with pale fuscous and ochreous; markings blackish fuscous mixed with ferruginous; basal patch, including three interrupted fasciae, marked by spots on costa, outer margin indented on fold, where it is strongly marked in blackish; a broad irregular fascia from middle of costa, becoming obscure below middle and not reaching dorsum; four spots on costa between median fascia end apex, giving rise to obscure fasciae which coalesce in disc: fringes grey, basally brownish. Hindwings greyish fuscous, paler towards costa: fringes whitish grey with fuscous basal line.

Philpott pointed out that this species is not superficially similar to any other New Zealand species of Epichorista. However E. mimica might be confused with Strepsicrates ejectana as it is similar in appearance to a pale specimen of the same. One of the two specimens taken by Clarke is very indefinitely marked with the bands of color across the forewing being reduced to a series of dots.

== Distribution ==
This species is endemic to New Zealand. It has been observed in Central Otago. E. mimica is regarded as being a rare species and as at 1994 had not been recollected.

== Behaviour ==
Adults are on the wing in February.
