= Epichoristodes apilectica =

Scientific classification
- Kingdom: Animalia
- Phylum: Arthropoda
- Class: Insecta
- Order: Lepidoptera
- Family: Tortricidae
- Genus: Epichoristodes
- Species: E. apilectica

Binomial name
- Epichoristodes apilectica Diakonoff, 1960

Species of moth

Epichoristodes apilectica is a species of moth of the family Tortricidae. It was first described by Alexey Diakonoff in 1960 and is found on Madagascar.

Afromoths uses the name Epichoristodes apiletica on its website. That website references Diakonoff's 1960 article "Tortricidae from Madagascar. Part I. Tortricinae and Chlidanotinae" published in Verhandelingen van de Koninklijke Nederlandse Academie van Wetenschappen (2) 53(2) pages 1–109. However Tortricid.net and the Global Lepidoptera Names Index use the spelling apilectica and reference the same journal and volume, but page 170.
