= Epichoristodes heterotropha =

Scientific classification
- Domain: Eukaryota
- Kingdom: Animalia
- Phylum: Arthropoda
- Class: Insecta
- Order: Lepidoptera
- Family: Tortricidae
- Genus: Epichoristodes
- Species: E. heterotropha

Binomial name
- Epichoristodes heterotropha Bradley, 1965

Species of moth

Epichoristodes heterotropha is a species of moth of the family Tortricidae. It is found in Uganda.
