= Epichoristodes leucocymba =

Scientific classification
- Kingdom: Animalia
- Phylum: Arthropoda
- Class: Insecta
- Order: Lepidoptera
- Family: Tortricidae
- Genus: Epichoristodes
- Species: E. leucocymba

Binomial name
- Epichoristodes leucocymba (Meyrick, 1912)

Synonyms
- Cacoecia leucocymba Meyrick, 1912

Species of moth

Epichoristodes leucocymba is a species of moth of the family Tortricidae. It is found in Madagascar.
