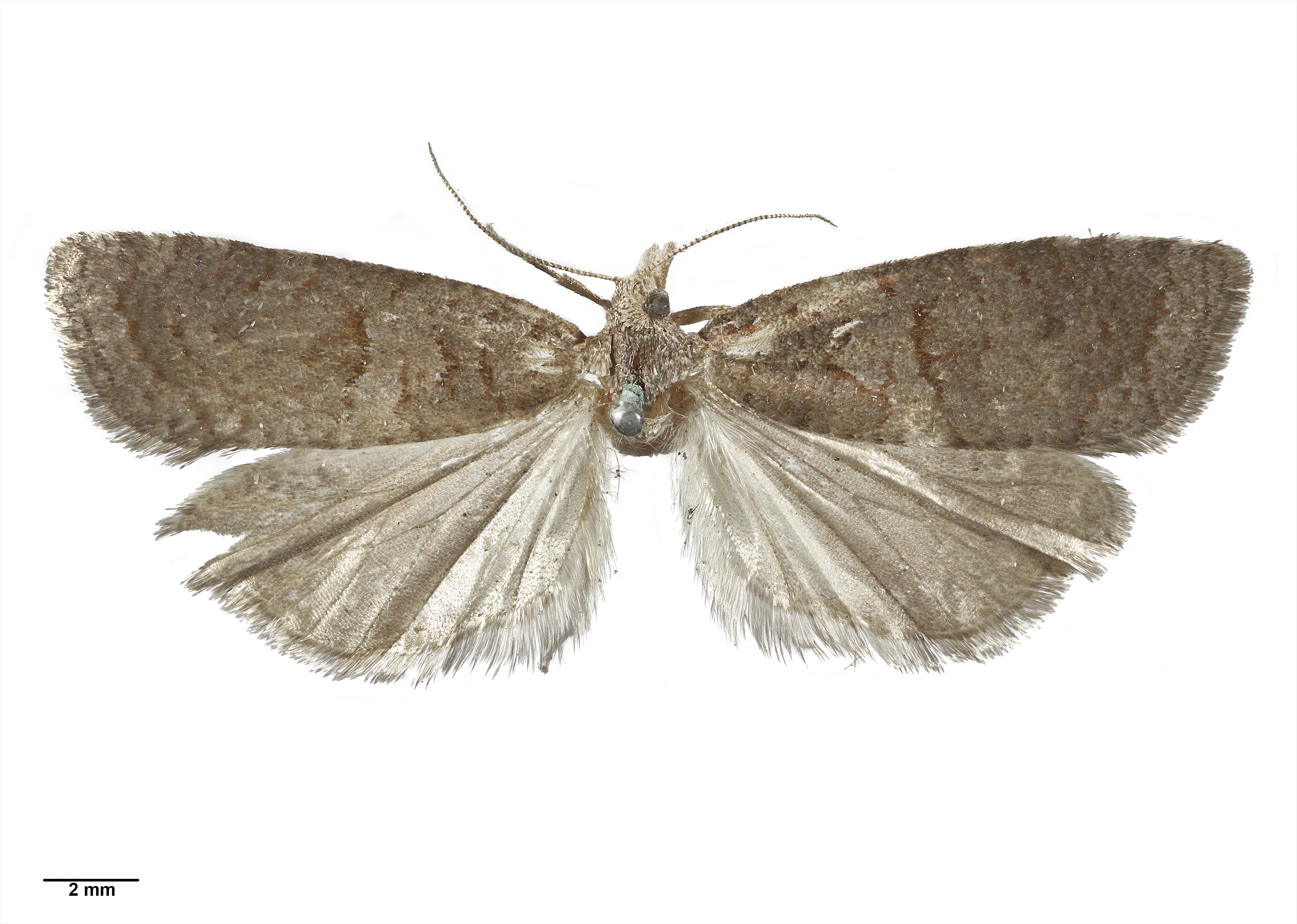
- Male

Conservation status
- Data Deficit (NZ TCS)

Scientific classification
- Kingdom: Animalia
- Phylum: Arthropoda
- Clade: Pancrustacea
- Class: Insecta
- Order: Lepidoptera
- Family: Tortricidae
- Genus: Epichorista
- Species: E. tenebrosa

Binomial name
- Epichorista tenebrosa Philpott, 1917

= Epichorista tenebrosa =

Species of moth endemic to New Zealand

Epichorista tenebrosa is a species of moth of the family Tortricidae. However the genus level classification of this moth is regarded as unsatisfactory and needs revision. E. tenebrosa is endemic to New Zealand. It is found only in Central Otago and has been collected in tussock grassland habitats. It is a late autumn emerging moth and adults are on the wing in February. In 2025 this species was classified as "data deficient" under the New Zealand Threat Classification System.

== Taxonomy ==
This species was first described by Alfred Philpott in 1917 from a specimen collected at Ben Lomond by Charles E. Clarke in February. In 1926 Meyrick confirmed the placement of this species in the genus Epichorista. George Hudson discussed and illustrated this species in his 1928 book The Butterflies and Moths of New Zealand. The genus level classification of New Zealand endemic moths within Epichorista is regarded as unsatisfactory and needs revision. As such this species is currently also known as Epichorista (s.l.) tenebrosa. The male holotype is held at the Auckland War Memorial Museum.

== Description ==
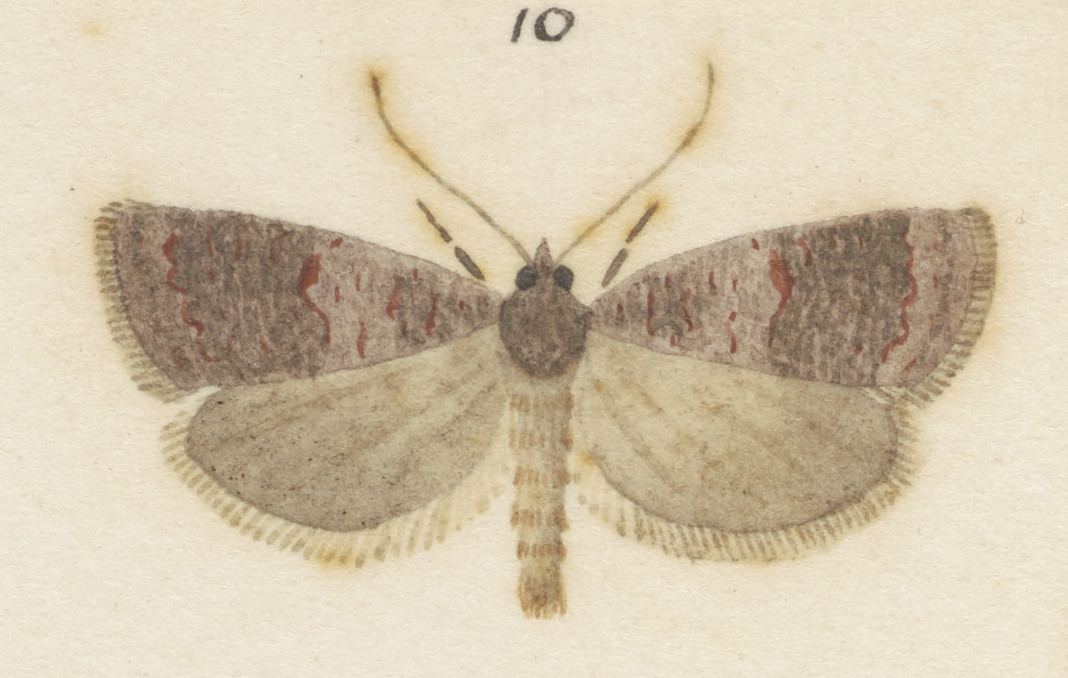
Illustration of male.

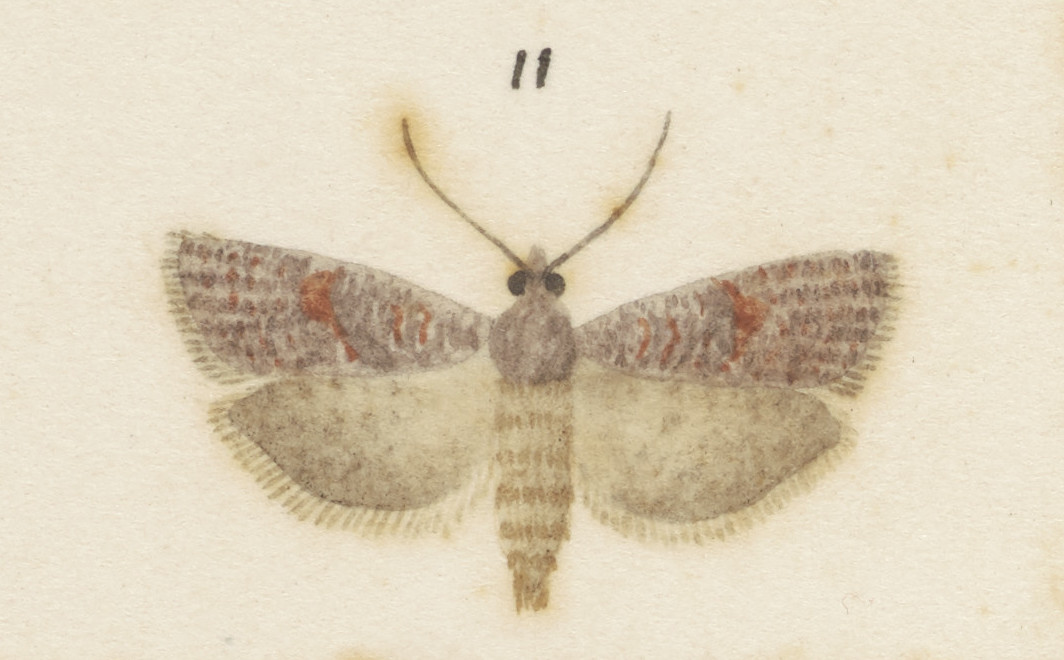
Illustration of female.

Philpott described the species as follows:

♂︎ 25-28 mm.; ♀︎ 22 mm. Head and palpi ochreous-grey mixed with brown, palpi 3. Antennal ciliations of ♂︎ 1 1/2. Thorax purplish-brown sprinkled with brown. Abdomen ochreous-grey. Forewings elongate-triangular in ♂︎, suboblong in ♀︎, costa almost straight, without fold, apex obtuse, termen subsinuate, hardly oblique; dull grey-brawn with purplish gloss and numerous obscure strigulations of reddish or fuscous; margin of basal patch usually indicated by a more pronounced irregular strigula; median fascia from 1/3 costa, irregular, outwardly oblique, inner margin only marked : cilia grey mixed with brown. Hindwings fuscous-grey, obscurely mottled with darker : cilia grey with darker basal line.

The female has shortened wings.

== Distribution ==
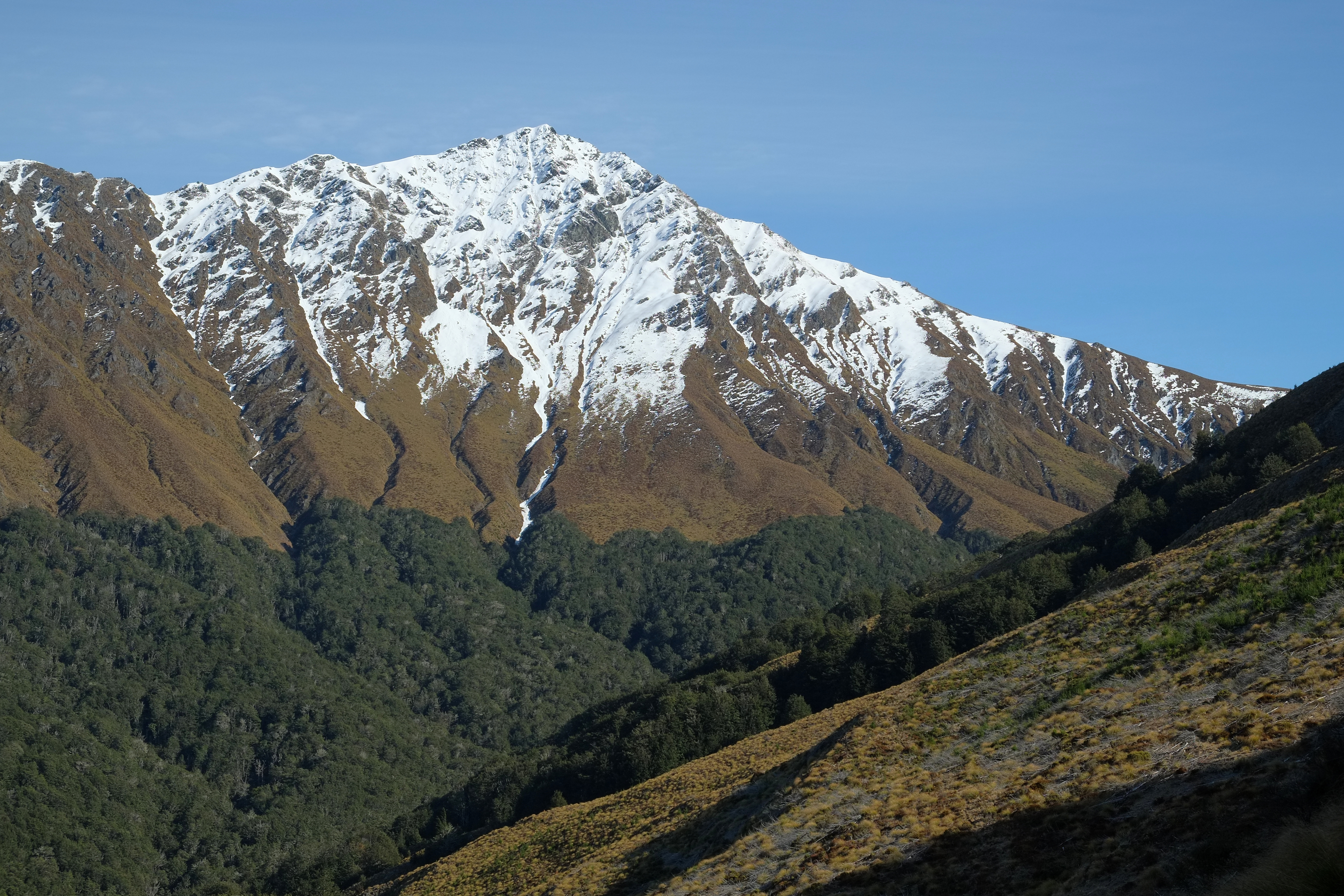
Ben Lomond, type locality for E. tenebrosa.

This species is endemic to New Zealand. It is found in Central Otago. As well as its type locality, this species has also been found in Naseby State Forest, at Roaring Meg and South Rough Ridge Hill. It has also been found at the Coronet Peak ski field.

== Behaviour ==
This species is a late autumn emerging moth. It is on the wing in February.

== Habitat ==
Hudson noted that the type specimen was found at an altitude of 4000 ft in tussock grasslands. The species has subsequently been collected from similar habitat.

== Conservation status ==
In 2025 this species was classified by the New Zealand Department of Conservation as "data deficient" under the New Zealand Threat Classification System.
