= Epichoristodes licmaea =

Scientific classification
- Kingdom: Animalia
- Phylum: Arthropoda
- Class: Insecta
- Order: Lepidoptera
- Family: Tortricidae
- Genus: Epichoristodes
- Species: E. licmaea

Binomial name
- Epichoristodes licmaea (Meyrick, 1920)

Synonyms
- Epichorista licmaea Meyrick, 1920

Species of moth

Epichoristodes licmaea is a species of moth of the family Tortricidae. It is found in Kenya.
