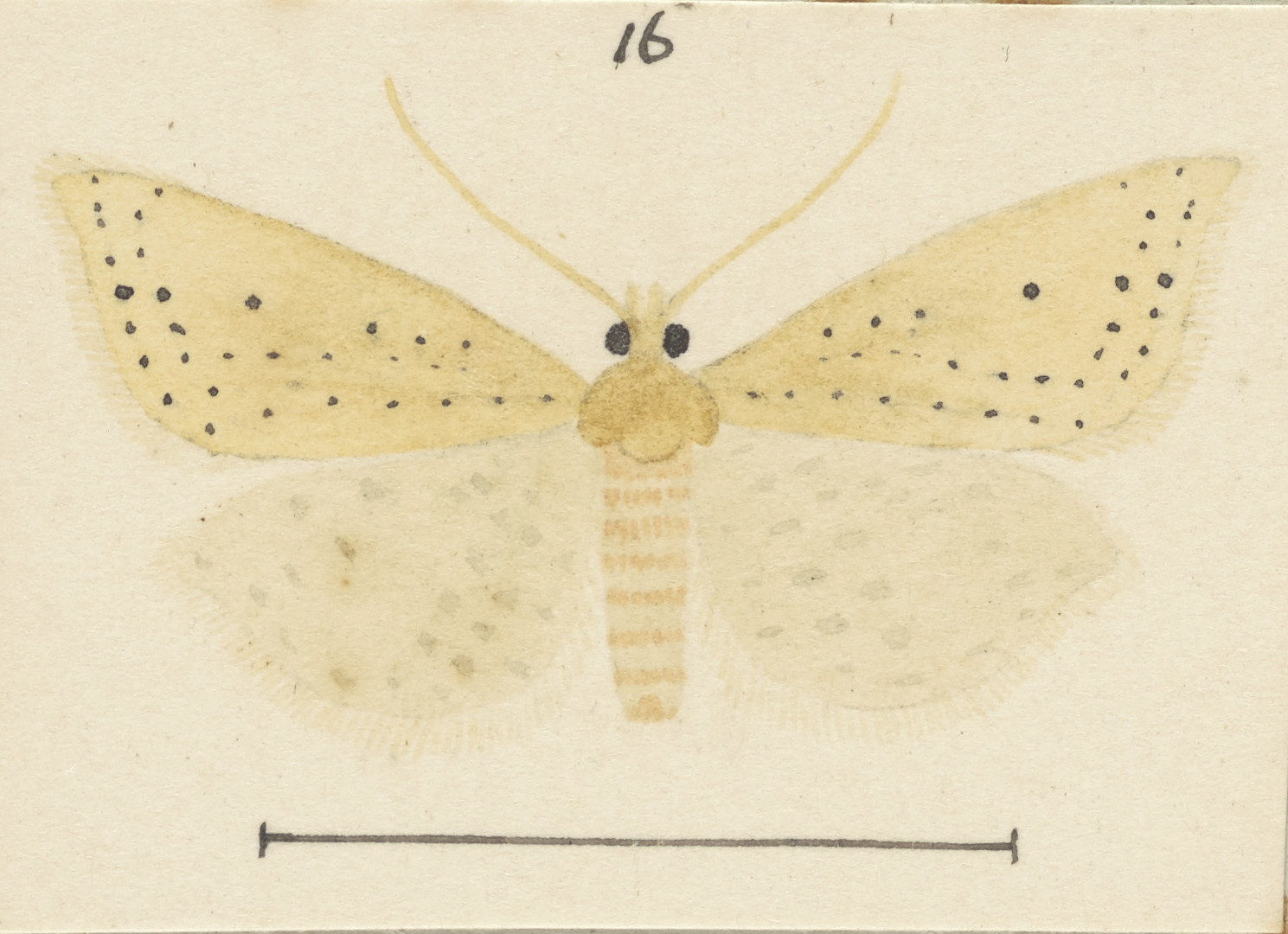

Scientific classification
- Kingdom: Animalia
- Phylum: Arthropoda
- Clade: Pancrustacea
- Class: Insecta
- Order: Lepidoptera
- Family: Tortricidae
- Genus: Epichorista
- Species: E. elephantina

Binomial name
- Epichorista elephantina (Meyrick, 1885)

Synonyms
- Proselena elephantina Meyrick, 1885

= Epichorista elephantina =

Species of moth endemic to New Zealand

Epichorista elephantina is a species of moth of the family Tortricidae. This species was first described by Edward Meyrick in 1885. It is endemic to New Zealand and has been observed at Arthur's Pass in the South Island. It inhabits grassy mountain slopes at altitudes of between 4000 and 5000 ft. Adults are on the wing in January.

== Taxonomy ==
This species was first described by Edward Meyrick in 1885 using a male specimen collected by Meyrick at Arthur's Pass at 4700 ft. and named Proselena elephantina. In 1911 Meyrick confirmed that this species was placed in Epichorista. Meyrick gave a more detailed description later in 1885. George Hudson discussed and illustrated this species both in his 1928 book The butterflies and moths of New Zealand and in his 1939 book A supplement to the butterflies and moths of New Zealand. Both Hudson and Meyrick described the female of the species. This species is regarded as being taxonomically unresolved as it likely belongs to another genus. It is therefore also known as Epichorista (s.l.) elephantina. The holotype specimen is held at the Natural History Museum, London.

== Description ==
Meyrick described the male of this species as follows:

Male.—27 mm. Head, palpi, and antennæ whitish-ochreous, palpi externally fuscous-tinged. Thorax pale yellowish-ochreous. Abdomen and legs whitish-ochreous, anterior and middle pair infuscated. Forewings elongate-triangular, costa slightly arched, apex round-pointed, hindmargin hardly perceptibly sinuate, oblique; whitish-ochreous; a cloudy central streak from base to beyond middle more yellowish-ochreous, containing several small dots of black scales, and an ill-defined longitudinal blackish line in disc, extending from ⅓ – ⅔; some fine scattered black dots towards hindmargin: cilia pale whitish-ochreous. Hindwings and cilia whitish. Singularly distinct by its comparatively gigantic size, pale colouring, and blackish discal line.

Hudson described the female of the species as follows:

The expansion of the wings of the female is 7/8 inch. The fore-wings are more pointed than in the male, the costa more arched, the termen more oblique (thus with smaller size showing some tendency to reduction). The hind-wings are rather dark grey.

Hudson stated that this species is distinct as a result of its comparatively gigantic size, pale colouring, and blackish discal line. He also stated that the moth is apparently rare and had only been located at Arthur's Pass.

== Distribution ==
E. elephantina is endemic to New Zealand. It has been observed at Arthur's Pass in the South Island.

== Habitat ==
This species inhabits grassy mountain slopes at altitudes between 4000 and 5000 ft.

== Behaviour ==
Adults of this species are on the wing in January.
