= Epichoristodes =

Scientific classification
- Domain: Eukaryota
- Kingdom: Animalia
- Phylum: Arthropoda
- Class: Insecta
- Order: Lepidoptera
- Family: Tortricidae
- Tribe: Archipini
- Genus: Epichoristodes; Diakonoff, 1960

Synonyms
- Tubula Diakonoff, 1960

Genus of tortrix moths

Epichoristodes is a genus of moths in the family Tortricidae and the tribe Archipini. The genus was erected by Alexey Diakonoff in 1960.

== Species ==
- Epichoristodes acerbella (Walker, 1864)
- Epichoristodes adustana (Walsingham, 1881)
- Epichoristodes apilectica Diakonoff, 1960
- Epichoristodes atricaput Diakonoff, 1973
- Epichoristodes atycta Bradley, 1965
- Epichoristodes canonicum Diakonoff, 1973
- Epichoristodes cinerata (Meyrick, 1920)
- Epichoristodes dorsiplagana (Walsingham, 1881)
- Epichoristodes exanimata (Meyrick, 1920)
- Epichoristodes goniopa Diakonoff, 1960
- Epichoristodes heterotropha Bradley, 1965
- Epichoristodes imbriculata (Meyrick, 1938)
- Epichoristodes incerta Diakonoff, 1960
- Epichoristodes leucocymba (Meyrick, 1912)
- Epichoristodes licmaea Meyrick, 1920
- Epichoristodes macrosema Diakonoff, 1970
- Epichoristodes niphosema (Meyrick, 1917)
- Epichoristodes panochra Bradley, 1965
- Epichoristodes phalaraea (Meyrick, 1920)
- Epichoristodes pylora (Meyrick, 1938)
- Epichoristodes spinulosa Meyrick, 1924
- Epichoristodes ypsilon Diakonoff, 1960

== Former species ==
- Epichoristodes psoricodes (Meyrick, 1911)

== See also ==
- List of Tortricidae genera
