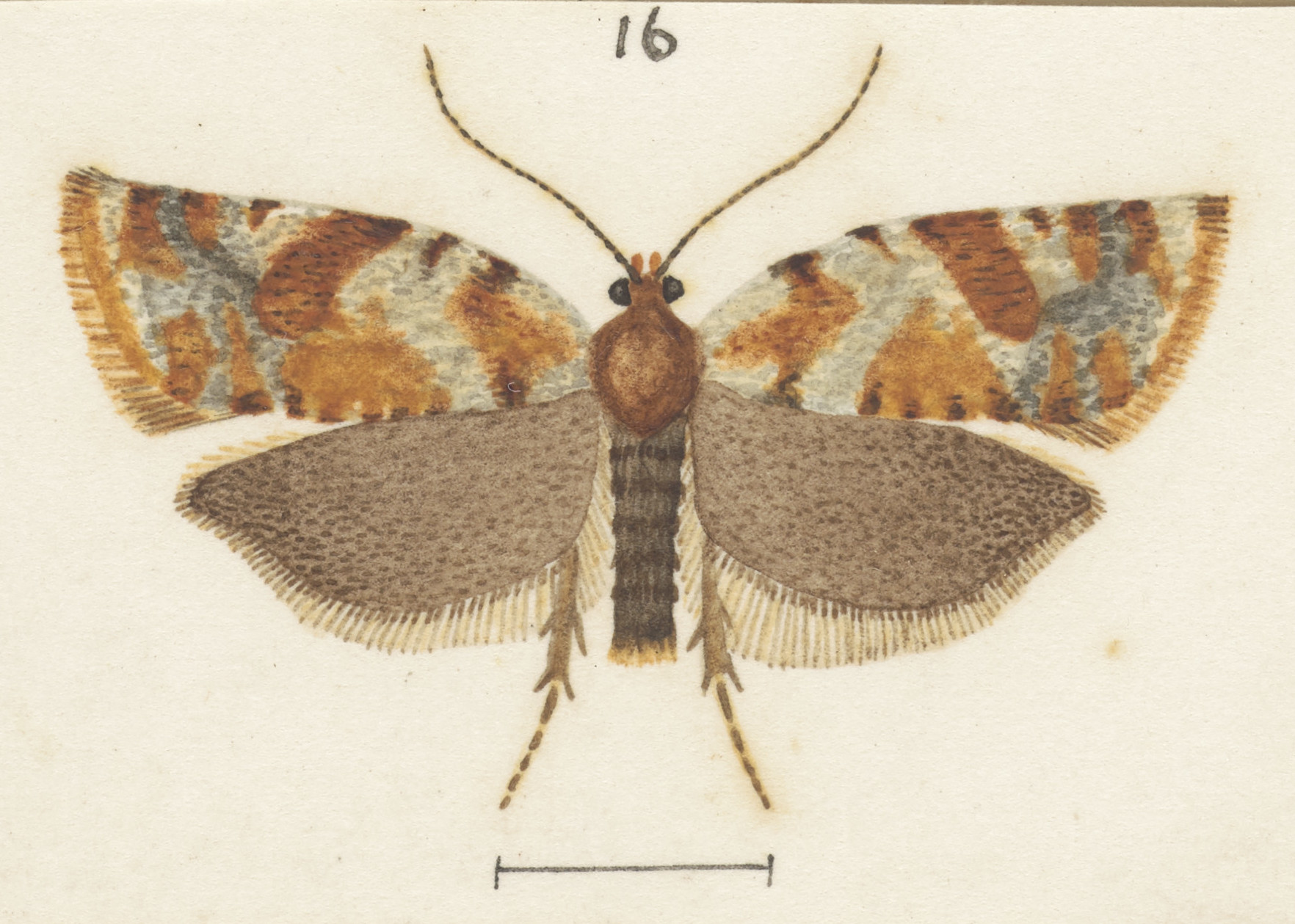
- Hudson's illustration of male Arthur's Pass specimen
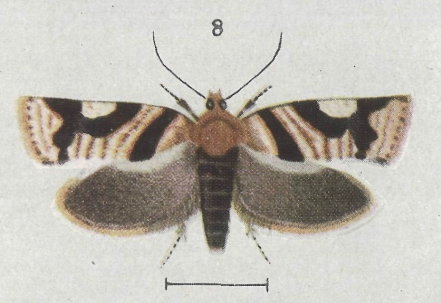
- Hudson's illustration of female of species

Scientific classification
- Kingdom: Animalia
- Phylum: Arthropoda
- Clade: Pancrustacea
- Class: Insecta
- Order: Lepidoptera
- Family: Tortricidae
- Genus: Epichorista
- Species: E. zatrophana

Binomial name
- Epichorista zatrophana (Meyrick, 1882)

Synonyms
- Harmologa zatrophana Meyrick, 1882; Proselena zatrophana (Meyrick, 1882)

= Epichorista zatrophana =

Species of moth endemic to New Zealand

Epichorista zatrophana is a species of moth of the family Tortricidae. This species was first described by Edward Meyrick in 1882. It is endemic to New Zealand. As at 2025, the true identity of this species is in doubt. The original description by Meyrick of this species is based on a specimen collected at light in Christchurch. However a subsequent description of this species made by Meyrick used specimens collected in January at Arthur's Pass as approximately 3000 ft. John S. Dugdale stated that the differences in location, altitude and month of collection of these specimens raised doubt about the true identity of this species. E. zatrophana is also regarded as being taxonomically unresolved as it likely belongs to another genus.

== Taxonomy ==
This species was first described by Edward Meyrick in 1882 using a female specimen collected by him at light in Christchurch in March and named Harmologa zatrophana. Meyrick gave a more detailed description of the species in 1883. In 1885 Meyrick redescribed the species and placed it in the genus Proselena. However he used male specimens collected in January at Arthur's Pass at altitudes of approximately 3000 ft. John S. Dugdale pointed out that as a result of the differences in location, altitude and month of collection the 1885 description may relate to another species and that this raises doubt about the true identity of this species. In 1911 Meyrick placed this species in the genus Epichorista. In 1928 George Hudson discussed and illustrated E. zatrophana in his book The butterflies and moths of New Zealand using a male specimen collected at Arthur's Pass. Following on from that description, Hudson in his book Fragments of New Zealand Entomology, discusses and illustrates the female of this species.

E. zatrophana is also regarded as being taxonomically unresolved as it likely belongs to another genus. It is therefore also known as Epichorista (s.l.) zatrophana. Dugdale states that the female holotype is not in the Natural History Museum, London.

== Description ==
Meyrick's 1883 description of the species, based on the female holotype was as follows:

Female—14 mm. Head, palpi and thorax reddish-ochreous-brown, mixed with whitish-grey; palpi moderate, grey-whitish internally and beneath. Antennae grey, annulated with black. Abdomen dark grey. Legs grey, anterior and middle tibiae and all tarsi suffused with dark fuscous, except at apex of joints. Forewings rather narrow, oblong, costa gently arched, apex nearly rectangular, hindmargin sinuate, not oblique; reddish-ochreous-brown, thickly mixed with dark fuscous-grey; a tolerably well-defined large whitish blotch on hindmargin, almost reaching costa and anal angle, extending in disc to 2/3 from base, containing two small pale ochreous spots mixed with grey scales, one on its upper and the other on its lower margin, almost uniting in middle, so as to bisect the blotch: cilia reddish-ochreous-brown mixed with grey. Hindwings dark grey, apex blackish-grey; cilia whitish-erey, with a dark grey basal line.

Meyrick pointed out that this species is very distinctive as a result of its deep colouring and the posterior whitish blotch.

Meyrick's 1885 description of the species, based on males collected at Arthur's Pass was as follows:

Male.—11–12 mm. Forewings bright ochreous, irregularly and suffusedly spotted with whitish; markings deep reddish-ochreous, somewhat mixed with blackish; a narrow straight fascia from before 1/4 of costa to beyond 1/3 of inner margin; a moderately broad very oblique fascia from costa before middle, confluent in middle of disc with a similar straight fascia from 3/4 of costa to Inner margin before anal angle, the latter fascia containing two irregular incomplete metallic-grey transverse lines: cilia bright ochreous, towards tips paler. Hindwings dark fuscous; cilia grey-whitish, with a dark grey basal line.

The male specimens collected for this description were said by Meyrick to be flying freely over thick herbage.

Hudson, following on from his description of the species using Arthur's Pass male specimens in The butterflies and moths of New Zealand, described the female of this species in Fragments of New Zealand Entomology, stating that the oblique transverse band before the middle and the heaving costal and subcostal markings are much more conspicuous in the female of the species as compared to the male.

== Distribution ==
This species is endemic to New Zealand. Specimens have been collected at the type locality of Christchurch and also at Arthur's Pass.

== Behaviour ==
Specimens said to be of this species have been collected on the wing in January and in March. It is attracted to light.
