= Epichorista perversa =

Scientific classification
- Kingdom: Animalia
- Phylum: Arthropoda
- Class: Insecta
- Order: Lepidoptera
- Family: Tortricidae
- Genus: Epichorista
- Species: E. perversa

Binomial name
- Epichorista perversa Meyrick, 1912

Species of moth

Epichorista perversa is a species of moth of the family Tortricidae. It is found in South Africa.
