= Epichorista phaeocoma =

Scientific classification
- Kingdom: Animalia
- Phylum: Arthropoda
- Class: Insecta
- Order: Lepidoptera
- Family: Tortricidae
- Genus: Epichorista
- Species: E. phaeocoma

Binomial name
- Epichorista phaeocoma Meyrick, 1914

Species of moth

Epichorista phaeocoma is a species of moth of the family Tortricidae. It is found in Malawi.
