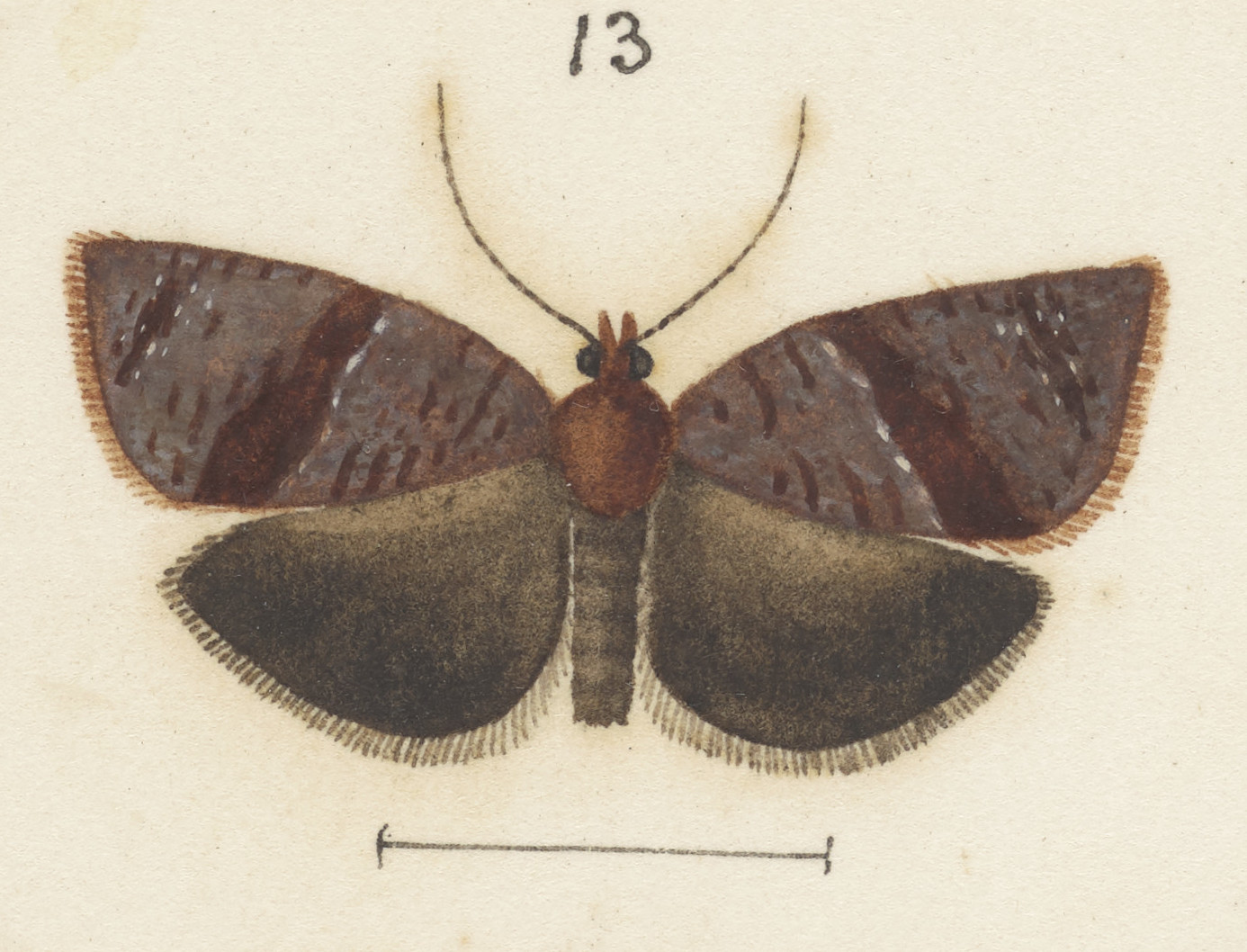

Scientific classification
- Kingdom: Animalia
- Phylum: Arthropoda
- Class: Insecta
- Order: Lepidoptera
- Family: Tortricidae
- Genus: Epichorista
- Species: E. eribola

Binomial name
- Epichorista eribola (Meyrick, 1889)

Synonyms
- Proselena eribola Meyrick, 1889

= Epichorista eribola =

Species of moth endemic to New Zealand

Epichorista eribola is a species of moth of the family Tortricidae. It is endemic to New Zealand and has been collected on the Westcoast of the South Island. The adults of this species are on the wing in January and inhabit damp forests.

== Taxonomy ==
This species was first described by Edward Meyrick in 1889 and named Proselena eribola. In 1911 Meyrick placed this species in the genus Epichorista. In 1928 George Hudson illustrated and discussed this species under that name. The male lectotype specimen, collected at Ōtira River, is held at the Natural History Museum, London.

== Description ==
♂. 14-15mm. Head, palpi, and thorax dark reddish-ochreous-brown. Antennae brownish-ochreous, ringed with dark fuscous. Abdomen dark fuscous. Legs dark fuscous, apex of joints pale yellowish, posterior tibiae pale greyish-ochreous. Forewings oblong, posteriorly scarcely dilated, costa on basal half rather strongly arched, then straight, apex obtuse, hindmargin slightly sinuate, somewhat oblique; dark reddish-ochreous-brown; a somewhat darker but very ill-defined central fascia from before middle of costa to inner margin before anal angle, narrow on costa, suddenly dilated above middle, thence to inner margin rather broad : cilia dark reddish-ochreous-brown, terminal half pale reddish-ochreous, on costa barred with dark brown. Hindwings and cilia dark fuscous; tips of cilia shortly below apex sometimes pale reddish-ochreous.

== Distribution ==
E. eribola is endemic to New Zealand. It has been collected at its type locality of Ōtira River as well as at Lake Poerua near Greymouth.

== Behaviour ==
The adults of this species are on the wing in January.

== Habitat ==
This species inhabits damp forests up to an altitude of 3000 ft.
