= Epichoristodes incerta =

Scientific classification
- Kingdom: Animalia
- Phylum: Arthropoda
- Class: Insecta
- Order: Lepidoptera
- Family: Tortricidae
- Genus: Epichoristodes
- Species: E. incerta

Binomial name
- Epichoristodes incerta Diakonoff, 1960

Synonyms
- Epichoristodes nervosum Diakonoff, 1970

Species of moth

Epichoristodes incerta is a species of moth of the family Tortricidae. It is found in Madagascar.
