= Epichoristodes imbriculata =

Scientific classification
- Kingdom: Animalia
- Phylum: Arthropoda
- Clade: Pancrustacea
- Class: Insecta
- Order: Lepidoptera
- Family: Tortricidae
- Genus: Epichoristodes
- Species: E. imbriculata

Binomial name
- Epichoristodes imbriculata (Meyrick, 1938)

Synonyms
- Catamacta imbriculata Meyrick, 1938

Species of moth

Epichoristodes imbriculata is a species of moth of the family Tortricidae. It is found in the Democratic Republic of Congo.
