= Epichoristodes spinulosa =

Scientific classification
- Kingdom: Animalia
- Phylum: Arthropoda
- Clade: Pancrustacea
- Class: Insecta
- Order: Lepidoptera
- Family: Tortricidae
- Genus: Epichoristodes
- Species: E. spinulosa

Binomial name
- Epichoristodes spinulosa (Meyrick, 1924)

Synonyms
- Tortrix spinulosa Meyrick, 1924

Species of moth

Epichoristodes spinulosa is a species of moth of the family Tortricidae. It is found in South Africa, where it has been recorded from the Western Cape.
