= Epichoristodes macrosema =

Scientific classification
- Kingdom: Animalia
- Phylum: Arthropoda
- Class: Insecta
- Order: Lepidoptera
- Family: Tortricidae
- Genus: Epichoristodes
- Species: E. macrosema

Binomial name
- Epichoristodes macrosema Diakonoff, 1970

Species of moth

Epichoristodes macrosema is a species of moth belonging to the family Tortricidae and sub-family Tortricinae. It is found in Madagascar.
