= Epichoristodes dorsiplagana =

Scientific classification
- Domain: Eukaryota
- Kingdom: Animalia
- Phylum: Arthropoda
- Class: Insecta
- Order: Lepidoptera
- Family: Tortricidae
- Genus: Epichoristodes
- Species: E. dorsiplagana

Binomial name
- Epichoristodes dorsiplagana (Walsingham, 1881)

Synonyms
- Cacoecia dorsiplagana Walsingham, 1881; Lozotaenia dorsiplagana

Species of moth

Epichoristodes dorsiplagana is a species of moth of the family Tortricidae. It is found in KwaZulu-Natal, South Africa.
