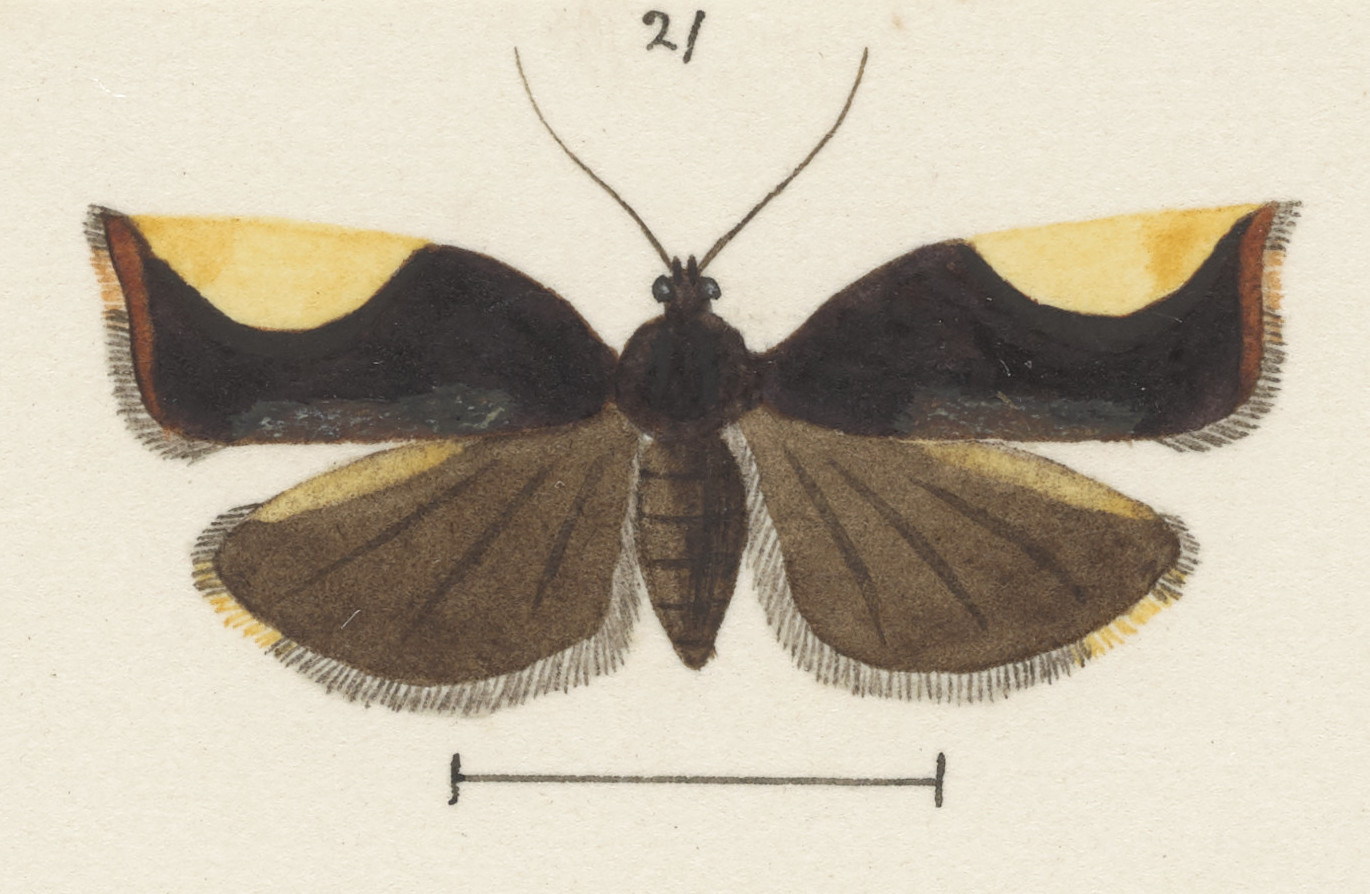
- Female
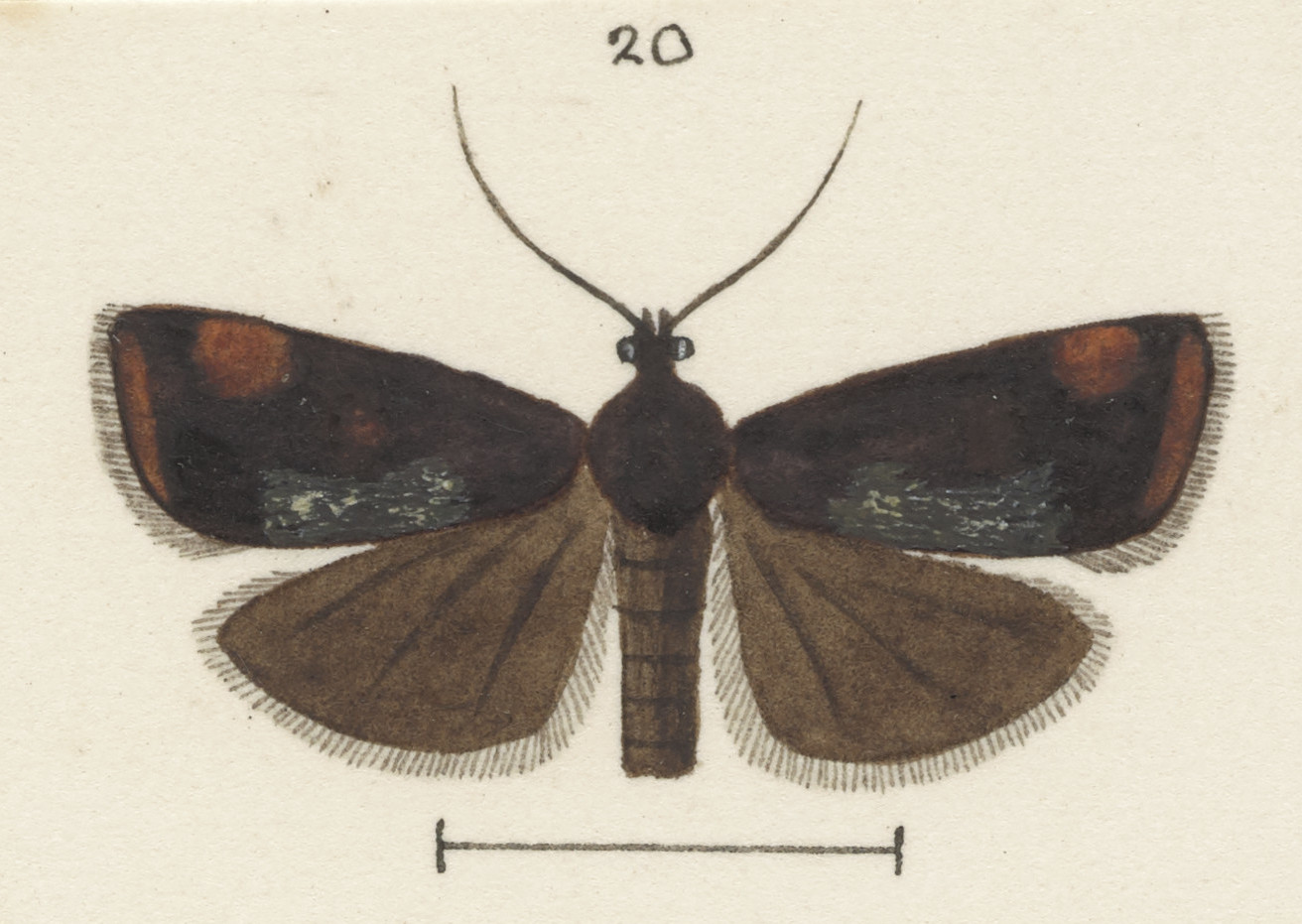
- Male

Conservation status
- Data Deficit (NZ TCS)

Scientific classification
- Kingdom: Animalia
- Phylum: Arthropoda
- Clade: Pancrustacea
- Class: Insecta
- Order: Lepidoptera
- Family: Tortricidae
- Genus: Epichorista
- Species: E. allogama

Binomial name
- Epichorista allogama (Meyrick, 1914)

Synonyms
- Harmologa allogama Meyrick, 1914

= Epichorista allogama =

Species of moth endemic to New Zealand

Epichorista allogama is a species of moth of the family Tortricidae. This species was first described by Edward Meyrick. It is endemic to New Zealand and has been observed in the Wellington Region. It is regarded as being very local, although is said to abundant where found. Adults are on the wing in late December and the species likely has a very short season. It has an affinity for Pittosporum tenuifolium from which Hudson hypothesised that this may be the moth's larval host. It is a day flying moth and takes short rapid flights during the afternoon and early evening. In 2025 this species was classified as "data deficient" under the New Zealand Threat Classification System by the Department of Conservation.

== Taxonomy ==
This species was first described by Edward Meyrick in 1914 using specimens collected by George Hudson in Hudson's garden in Karori, Wellington in December. Meyrick originally named the species Harmologa allogama. In 1923 Meyrick placed this species in the genus Epichorista. Hudson discussed and illustrated this species under the name Epichorista allogama in his 1928 book The butterflies and moths of New Zealand. In 1928 Alfred Philpott also discussed and illustrated the male genitalia of this species. This species is regarded as being taxonomically unresolved as it likely belongs to another genus. It is therefore also known as Epichorista (s.l.) allogama. The lectotype specimen, collected by Hudson in Wellington, is held at the Natural History Museum, London.

== Description ==
Meyrick described the adult moth as follows:

♂. 14-15 mm., ♀. 16-17 mm. Head and thorax dark purple-fuscous. Palpi in ♂ under 2, dark fuscous; in ♀ 2, whitish mixed with fuscous. Antennal ciliations in ♂ 1 1/2. Abdomen dark fuscous. Forewings in ♂elongate, rather dilated posteriorly, costa gently arched, with moderate fold from base to 2/5, apex obtuse, termen somewhat sinuate, little oblique, in ♀ more oblong, costa anteriorly moderately arched, then nearly straight; dark fuscous, more or less wholly suffused with deep purple; a patch of ochreous-whitish irroration extending along dorsum from 1/4 to 3/4, upper edge indented in middle; in ♂ a patch of deep-ferruginous suffusion sprinkled with yellowish on costa towards apex; in ♀ a semioval yellow-whitish blotch extending along costa from 2/5 to near apex; termen slenderly suffused with deep ferruginous : cilia dark purplish-leaden, with blackish subbasal line, in ♀ slightly mixed with whitish beneath apex. Hindwings dark fuscous; cilia in ♂ grey with black subbasal line, in ♀ lighter grey, tinged with whitish beneath apex, with dark-fuscous subbasal line becoming deep ferruginous round apex.

Meyrick found the differences in the sexes of this species remarkable. Hudson pointed out that a variety of the female occurs where the forewings are entirely cream-coloured.

== Distribution ==
This species is endemic to New Zealand. It has been observed in Wellington in Karori and in the hills on the eastern side of Wellington harbour. It is apparently very local, although abundant where found.

== Behaviour ==
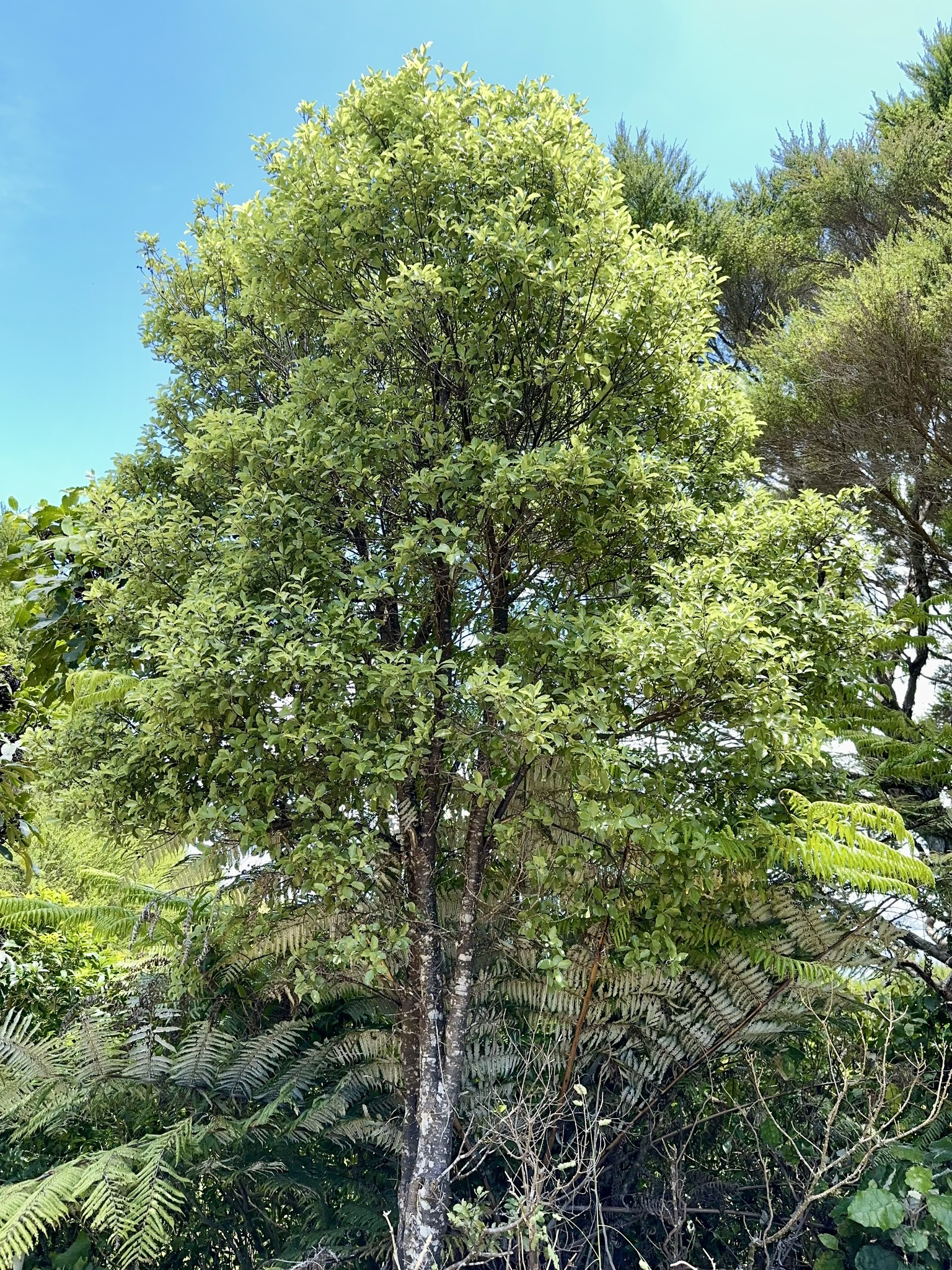
Pittosporum tenuifolium.

Adults of this species are on the wing in late December. It is on the wing for a very short season and frequents Pittosporum tenuifolium. Hudson hypothesised this plant may be its larval host plant. Adults flies with a short rapid flight during the afternoon and early evening.

== Conservation status ==
In 2025 this species was classified by the New Zealand Department of Conservation as "data deficient" under the New Zealand Threat Classification System.
