= Epichoristodes acerbella =

Scientific classification
- Kingdom: Animalia
- Phylum: Arthropoda
- Class: Insecta
- Order: Lepidoptera
- Family: Tortricidae
- Genus: Epichoristodes
- Species: E. acerbella

Binomial name
- Epichoristodes acerbella (Walker, 1864)

Synonyms
- Depressaria acerbella Walker, 1864; Epichoristodes (Tubula) acerbella; Proselena ionephela Meyrick, 1909; Epichoristodes ionephela; Epichorista galeata Meyrick, 1921; Tortrix iocoma Meyrick, 1908

Species of moth

Epichoristodes acerbella is a species of moth of the family Tortricidae. It is found in Kenya, Madagascar, Réunion, South Africa (Western Cape, Gauteng, Limpopo) and Zimbabwe.

The larvae feed on Pinus radiata and Widdingtonia whytei.
