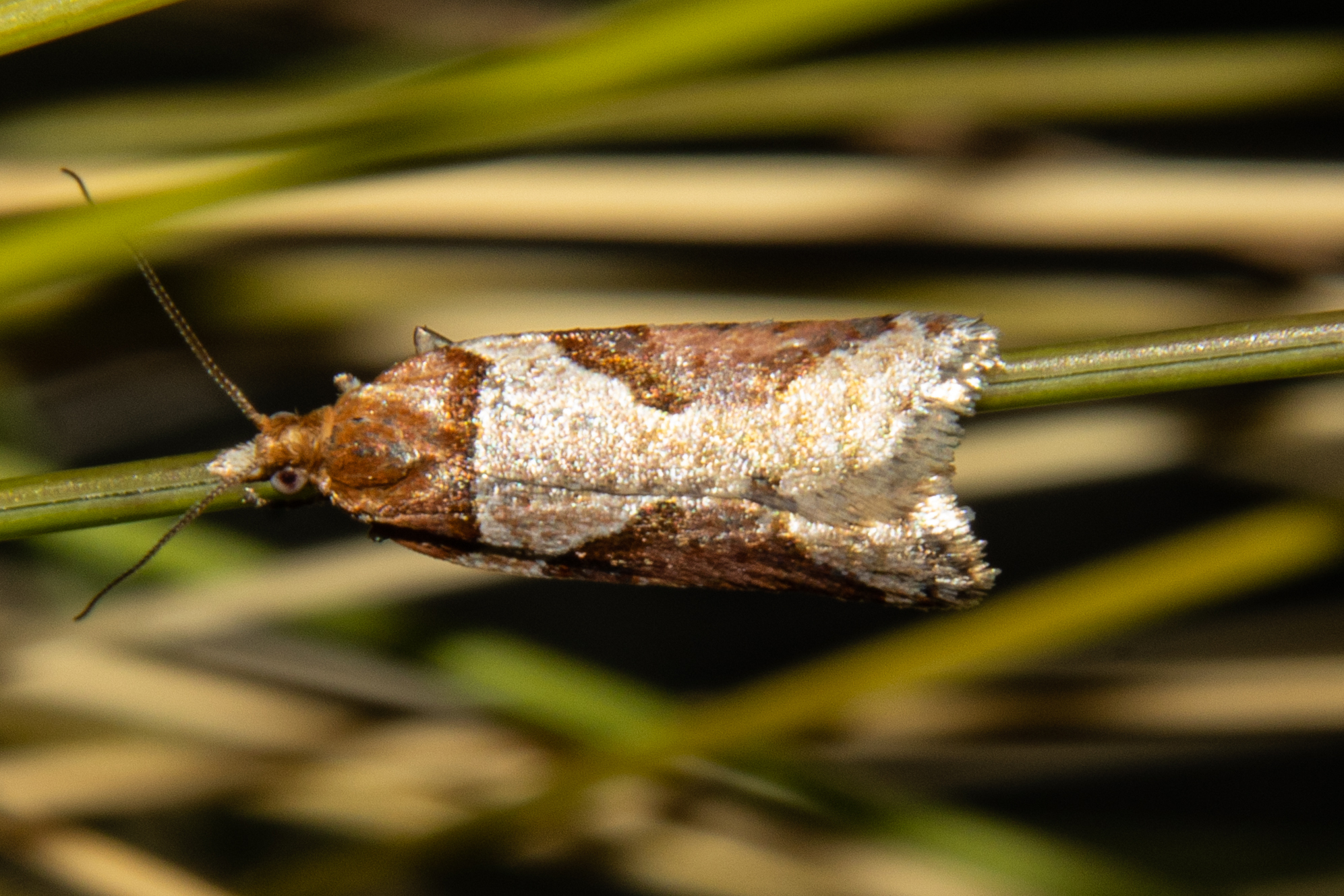

Scientific classification
- Kingdom: Animalia
- Phylum: Arthropoda
- Class: Insecta
- Order: Lepidoptera
- Family: Tortricidae
- Genus: Epichorista
- Species: E. aspistana

Binomial name
- Epichorista aspistana (Meyrick, 1882)

Synonyms
- Proselena aspistana Meyrick, 1882; Eurythecta aspistana (Meyrick, 1882)

= Epichorista aspistana =

Species of moth endemic to New Zealand

Epichorista aspistana is a species of moth of the family Tortricidae. It is endemic to New Zealand and has been collected in Canterbury and Otago. This species inhabits moist grassy areas at altitudes ranging from sea level to 1650m. Larvae feed on species within the genus Acaena. Adults are on the wing from November to February.

== Taxonomy ==
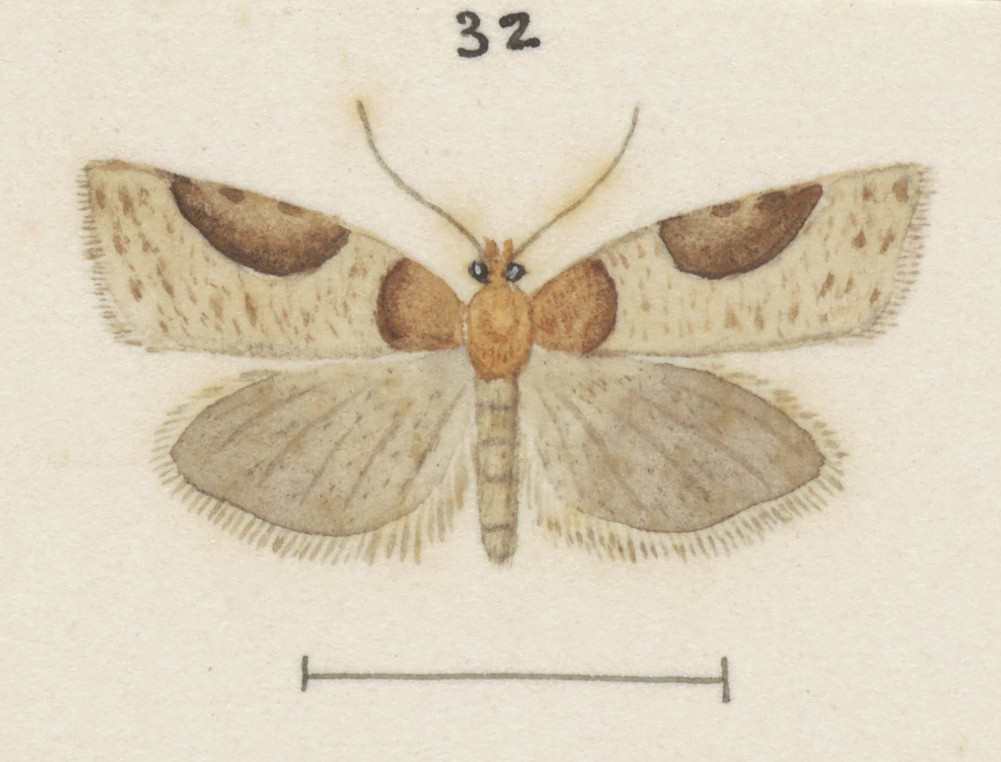
Illustration of E. aspistana by George Hudson.

This species was first described by Edward Meyrick in 1882 using specimens collected by J. D. Enys at Porters Pass and named Proselena aspistana. Meyrick went on to give a fuller description of the species in 1883. In 1911 Meyrick placed this species in the genus Epichorista. George Hudson, in 1928, discussed and illustrated this species in his book The butterflies and moths of New Zealand. Also in 1928 Alfred Philpott discussed and illustrated the male genitalia of this species. In 1988 J. S. Dugdale confirmed this placement. In 2010 this placement was again confirmed by Robert Hoare in the New Zealand Inventory of Biodiversity. The male lectotype, collected at Castle Hill, Porters Pass in Canterbury, is held at the Natural History Museum, London.

== Description ==
Meyrick described this species as follows:

Male. — 13 mm. Head, palpi, and thorax whitish-grey, somewhat mixed with fuscous (but damaged). Antennae whitish-grey (?). Abdomen whitish-grey. Legs whitish-grey, anterior and middle pair suffused with dark fuscous except at apex of joints. Forewings oblong, rather narrow, slightly dilated posteriorly, costa moderately arched near base, thence nearly straight, somewhat sinuate beyond middle, hindmargin rather strongly oblique, nearly straight, very slightly sinuate; whitish-grey, with some scattered spots of dark fuscous scales; basal patch reddish-brown, exterior edge sharply marked, broadly dark fuscous, from 1/5 of costa to 1/5 of inner margin, irregular, hardly angulated; a large reddish-brown triangular costal patch, extending on costa from 1/3 to near apex, reaching rather more than half across wing, apex broken and partially suffused, anterior and posterior edges sharply marked, broadly margined with dark fuscous, costal edge marked with three small dark fuscous spots; a similar small dark fuscous spot on costa before apex : cilia grey- whitish, with a dark grey basal line. Hindwings grey, with a pencil of long whitish-yellowish hairs on costa at base; cilia pale grey.

Hudson pointed out that the female is smaller with the wings narrower; there is a large, pale patch at the extreme base of the forewings converting the basal marking into a broad band and the pale central portion of the large costal patch is much more pronounced than in the male.

== Distribution ==
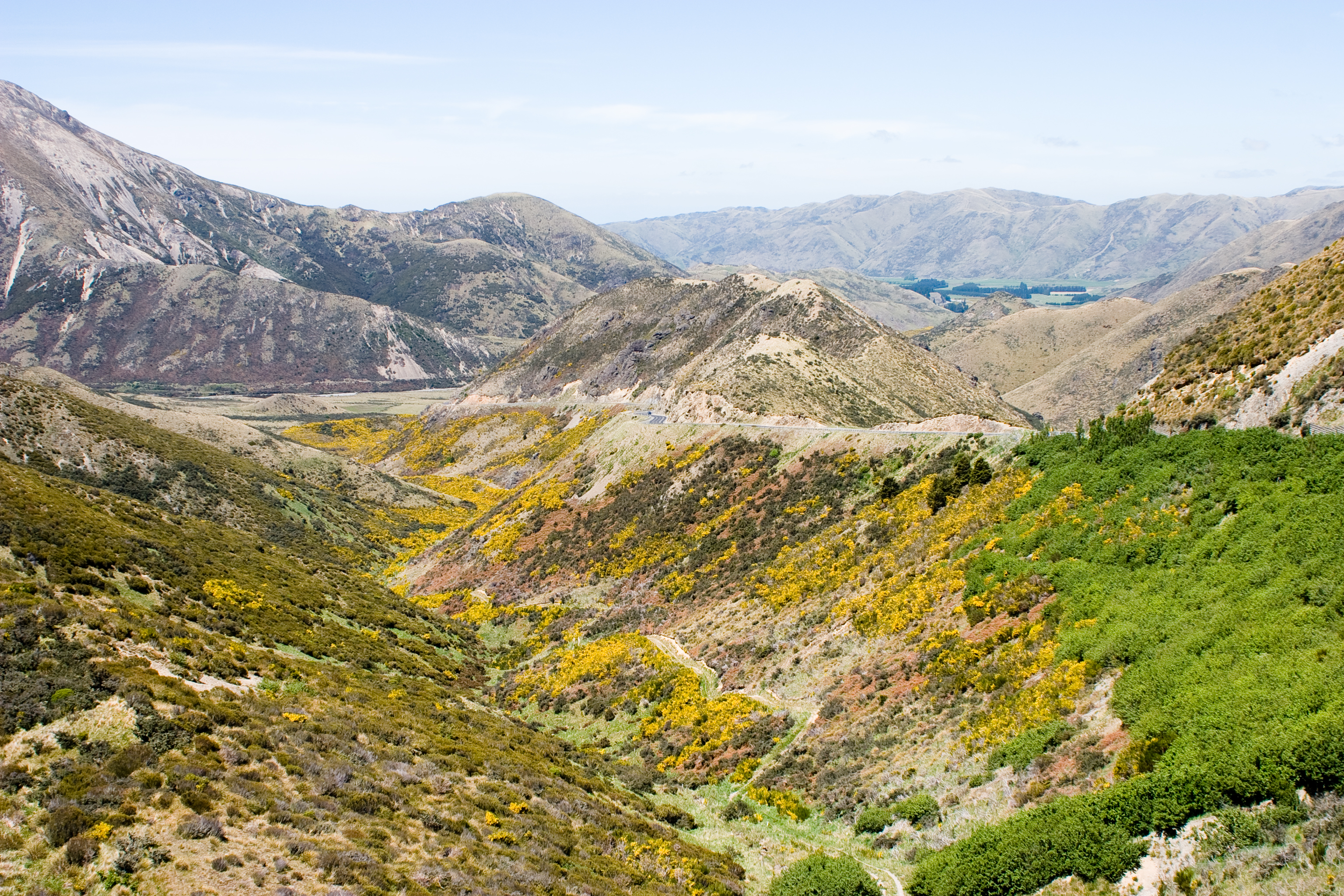
Porters Pass, the type locality of this species.

This species is endemic to New Zealand and has been found at the species type locality of Porters Pass as well as at near Dunedin.

== Habitat ==
This species inhabits moist grassy areas and has been collected at altitudes ranging from sea level to 1650m.

== Host species ==
Larvae of this species have been collected on plants in the genus Acaena.

== Behaviour ==
The larvae of this species web the leaves of its host plants together and feed from this shelter. The adults of this species are on the wing from November to February.
