= Epichoristodes adustana =

Scientific classification
- Domain: Eukaryota
- Kingdom: Animalia
- Phylum: Arthropoda
- Class: Insecta
- Order: Lepidoptera
- Family: Tortricidae
- Genus: Epichoristodes
- Species: E. adustana

Binomial name
- Epichoristodes adustana (Walsingham, 1881)

Synonyms
- Cacoecia adustana Walsingham, 1881; Lozotaenia adustana

Species of moth

Epichoristodes adustana is a species of moth of the family Tortricidae. It is found in KwaZulu-Natal, South Africa.
