= Epichorista samata =

Scientific classification
- Domain: Eukaryota
- Kingdom: Animalia
- Phylum: Arthropoda
- Class: Insecta
- Order: Lepidoptera
- Family: Tortricidae
- Genus: Epichorista
- Species: E. samata

Binomial name
- Epichorista samata Diakonoff, 1941

Species of moth

Epichorista samata is a species of moth of the family Tortricidae. It is found in New Guinea.
