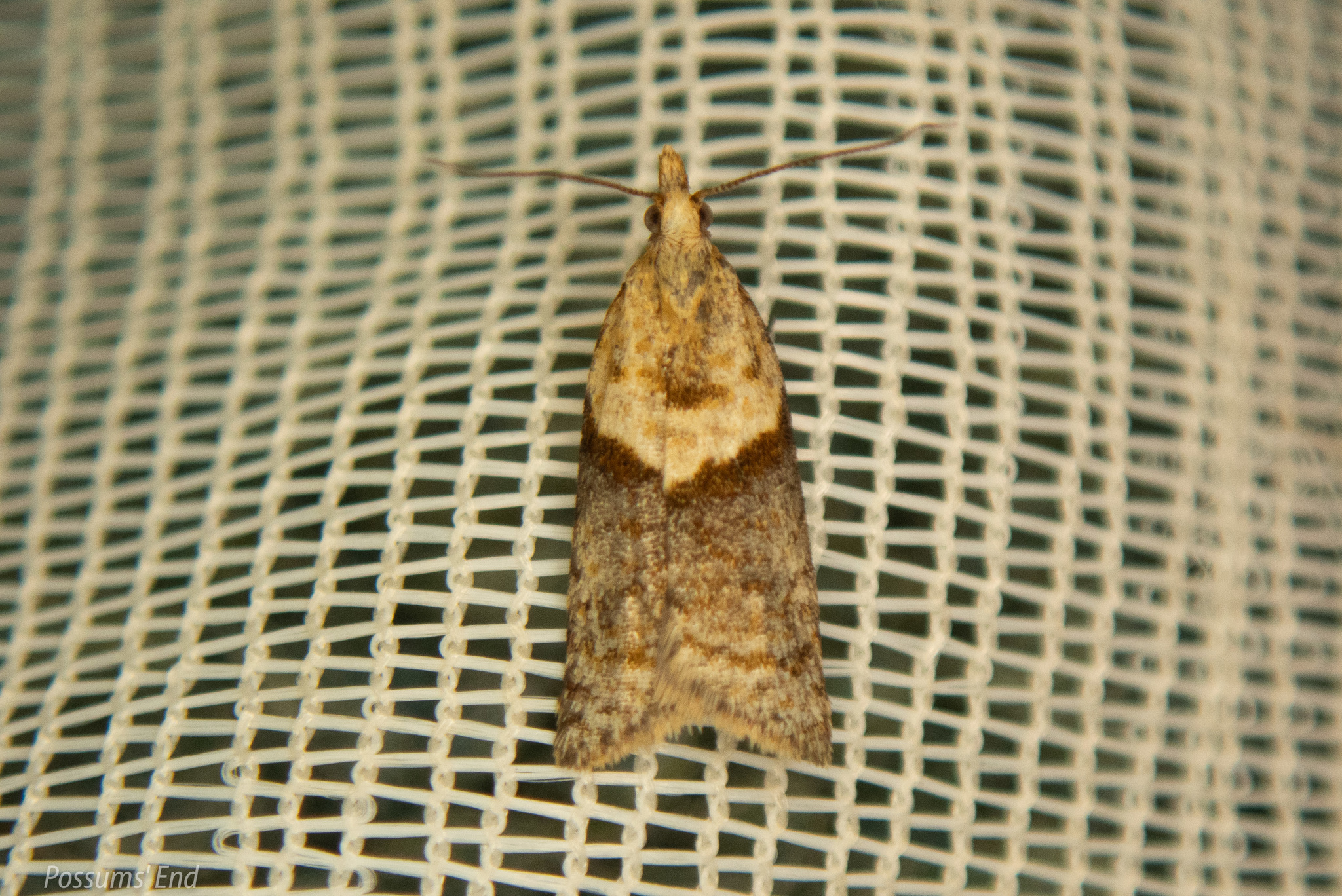

Scientific classification
- Kingdom: Animalia
- Phylum: Arthropoda
- Clade: Pancrustacea
- Class: Insecta
- Order: Lepidoptera
- Family: Tortricidae
- Genus: Epichorista
- Species: E. hemionana

Binomial name
- Epichorista hemionana (Meyrick, 1882)

Synonyms
- Proselena hemionana Meyrick, 1882

= Epichorista hemionana =

Species of moth endemic to New Zealand

Epichorista hemionana is a species of moth of the family Tortricidae. This species was first described by Edward Meyrick in 1882. It is endemic to New Zealand. This species is found only in the South Island in the regions of Canterbury, Otago and Southland. Larvae tie together the leaves of its host plants, species in the genus Acaena and other herbs. Adults are on the wing from January to April.

== Taxonomy ==
This species was first described by Edward Meyrick in 1882 using specimens collected by Richard William Fereday near Lake Guyon in March. Meyrick went on to give a fuller description of the species in 1883. In 1909 Meyrick placed this species in the genus Epichorista. This species is the type species of that genus. George Hudson, in 1928, followed Meyrick and discussed and illustrated this species in his book The butterflies and moths of New Zealand under the name Epichorista hemionana. In 1928 Alfred Philpott also discussed and illustrated the male genitalia of this species under that name. J. S. Dugdale confirmed this placement in 1988. In 2010 this placement was again confirmed by Robert Hoare in the New Zealand Inventory of Biodiversity. The lectotype specimen is held at the Natural History Museum, London.

== Description ==
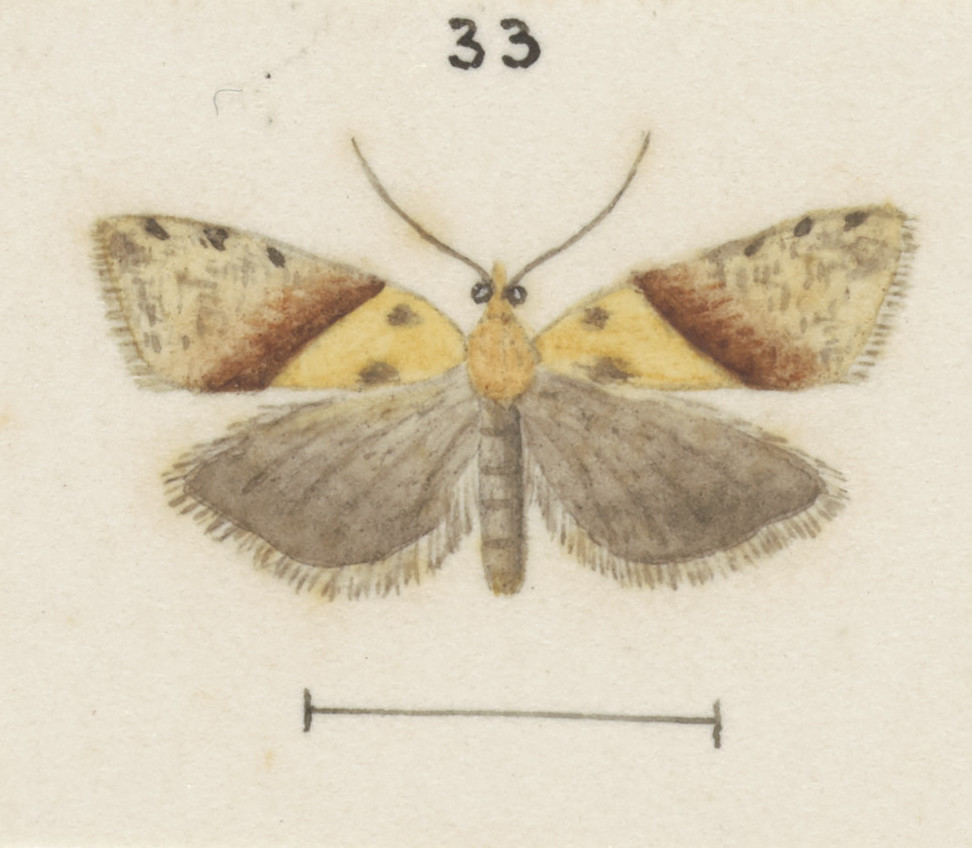
Illustration of male by Hudson.

Meyrick described this species as follows:

Male.—12 1/2-13 1/2 mm. Head, palpi, and thorax whitish-ochreous; palpi rather elongate, externally fuscous. Antenne whitish-ochreous, annulated with dark fuscous. Abdomen light grey. Legs grey-whitish, anterior and middle pair suffused with dark fuscous except at apex of joints. Forewings moderate, posteriorly somewhat dilated, costa rather strongly arched near base, thence nearly straight, hindmargin nearly straight, oblique; pale whitish-ochreous, with scattered obscure ochreous-fuscous strigule; base indistinctly suffused with ochreous-brownish; posterior 3/5, beyond a straight sharply-defined line from 2/5 of costa to slightly beyond middle of inner margin, fuscous, strigulated with dark reddish-fuscous, and becoming dark fuscous towards anterior edge, more broadly towards costa, and on a small very ill-defined costal spot towards apex: cilia whitish-ochreous or light brownish-ochreous, with a broad dark fuscous basal line. Hindwings grey; cilia grey-whitish, with a darker basal line.

This species is noticeable as a result of the contrast between the pale basal and dark posterior areas.

== Distribution ==
This species is endemic to New Zealand. This species is found in the regions of Canterbury, Otago and Southland.

== Habitat ==
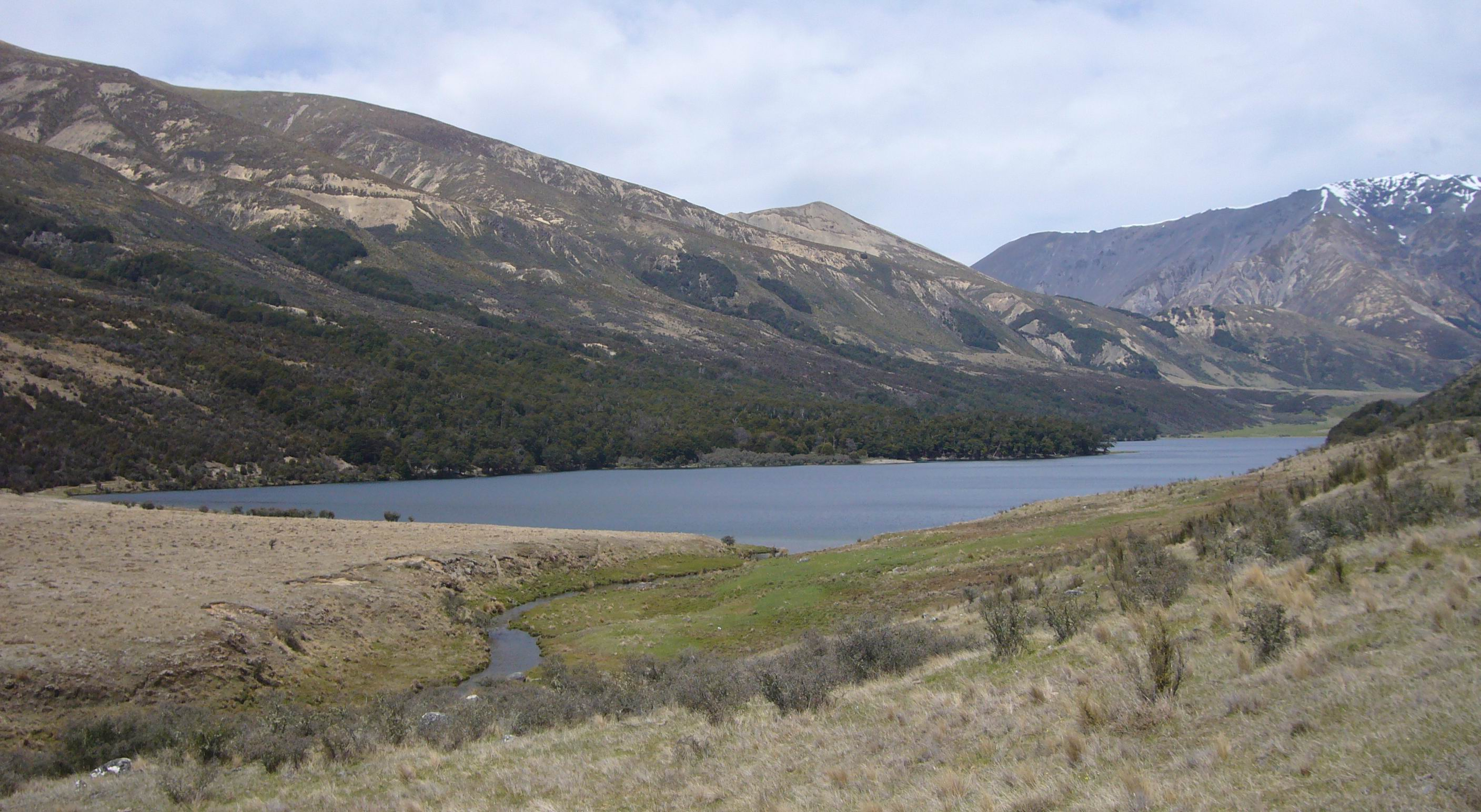
Lake Guyon, the type locality.

This species inhabits moist areas of snow tussock grassland from lowland to sub alpine altitudes.

== Behaviour ==
Larvae tie together the leaves of its host plants, species in the genus Acaena and other herbs. Adults are on the wing from January until April.
