= Epichoristodes canonicum =

Scientific classification
- Kingdom: Animalia
- Phylum: Arthropoda
- Clade: Pancrustacea
- Class: Insecta
- Order: Lepidoptera
- Family: Tortricidae
- Genus: Epichoristodes
- Species: E. canonicum

Binomial name
- Epichoristodes canonicum Diakonoff, 1973

Species of moth

Epichoristodes canonicum is a species of moth of the family Tortricidae. It is found in Madagascar.
