= Epichorista aethocoma =

Scientific classification
- Kingdom: Animalia
- Phylum: Arthropoda
- Class: Insecta
- Order: Lepidoptera
- Family: Tortricidae
- Genus: Epichorista
- Species: E. aethocoma

Binomial name
- Epichorista aethocoma Meyrick, 1923

Species of moth

Epichorista aethocoma is a species of moth of the family Tortricidae. It is found in Angola.
