= Epichoristodes phalaraea =

Scientific classification
- Kingdom: Animalia
- Phylum: Arthropoda
- Class: Insecta
- Order: Lepidoptera
- Family: Tortricidae
- Genus: Epichoristodes
- Species: E. phalaraea

Binomial name
- Epichoristodes phalaraea (Meyrick, 1920)

Synonyms
- Epichorista phalaraea Meyrick, 1920

Species of moth

Epichoristodes phalaraea is a species of moth of the family Tortricidae. It is found in Western Cape, South Africa.
