= Epichoristodes niphosema =

Scientific classification
- Kingdom: Animalia
- Phylum: Arthropoda
- Class: Insecta
- Order: Lepidoptera
- Family: Tortricidae
- Genus: Epichoristodes
- Species: E. niphosema

Binomial name
- Epichoristodes niphosema (Meyrick, 1917)

Synonyms
- Epichorista niphosema Meyrick, 1917

Species of moth

Epichoristodes niphosema is a species of moth of the family Tortricidae. It is found in Western Cape, South Africa.
