= Epichoristodes exanimata =

Scientific classification
- Kingdom: Animalia
- Phylum: Arthropoda
- Class: Insecta
- Order: Lepidoptera
- Family: Tortricidae
- Genus: Epichoristodes
- Species: E. exanimata

Binomial name
- Epichoristodes exanimata (Meyrick, 1920)

Synonyms
- Epichorista exanimata Meyrick, 1920

Species of moth

Epichoristodes exanimata is a species of moth of the family Tortricidae. It is found in Western Cape, South Africa.
