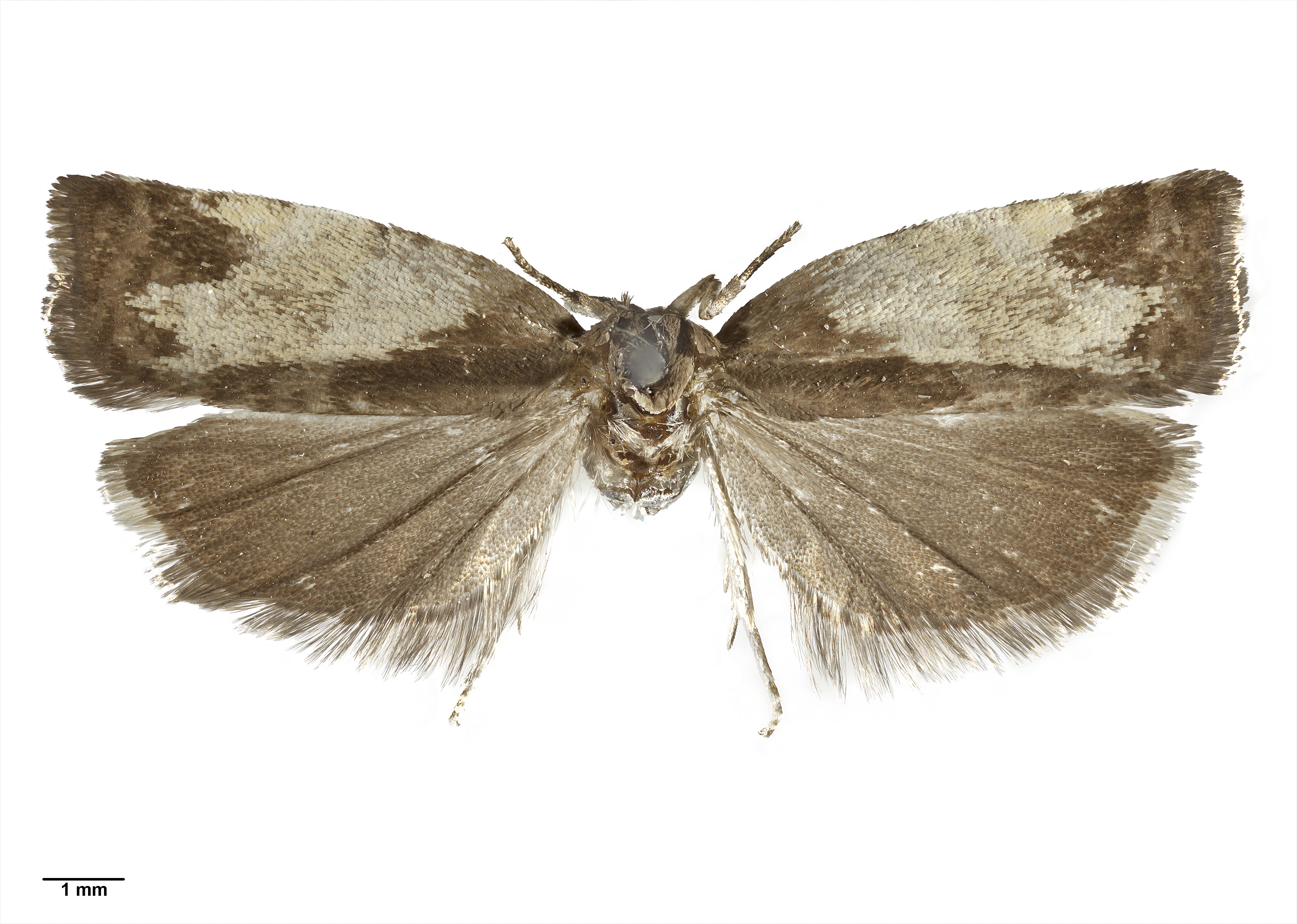
- Female holotype specimen for synonym Epichorista candida.

Scientific classification
- Kingdom: Animalia
- Phylum: Arthropoda
- Clade: Pancrustacea
- Class: Insecta
- Order: Lepidoptera
- Family: Tortricidae
- Genus: Epichorista
- Species: E. emphanes

Binomial name
- Epichorista emphanes (Meyrick, 1901)

Synonyms
- Proselena emphanes Meyrick, 1901; Harmologa achrosta Meyrick, 1901; Harmologa epicura Meyrick, 1911; Epichorista theatralis Philpott, 1918; Epichorista candida Clarke, 1926

= Epichorista emphanes =

Species of moth endemic to New Zealand

Epichorista emphanes, the lesser beech leafroller, is a species of moth of the family Tortricidae. It was first described by Edward Meyrick in 1901. It is endemic to New Zealand and is found on the North and South Islands. This species inhabits native beech forests. Larvae feed on the emerging leaves and blossoms of trees in the genus Nothofagus, including Nothofagus mensiesii. The larvae are very active, fastening the leaves together with silk and living between them. The larvae of E. emphanes themselves play larval host to species of parasitic hymenoptera. When formed the pupa is enclosed between two joined beech leaves. Adults are on the wing commonly from November until February. They are day flying and are particularly active in hot sunshine, inhabiting open glades or flying amongst beech trees.

The male and female of this species are different in appearance and the females are also highly variable in appearance. This difference and variability had lead this species to be described by taxonomists on multiple occasions.

== Taxonomy ==
This species was first described by Edward Meyrick in 1901 and named Proselena emphanes. Later in the same publication Meyrick, thinking he was describing a new species, named this moth Harmologa achrosta. Meyrick described the male of this species in 1911 under the name E. emphanes, and in a later 1911 publication, confirmed the placement of this species in Epichorista. Also in 1911, again thinking he was describing a new species, Meyrick named this moth Harmologa epicura. Meyrick then synonymised this name with Harmologa achrosta. In 1918 Alfred Philpott, thinking he was describing a new species, named this moth Epichorista theatralis. In 1923 both Epichorista theatralis and Harmologa achrosta were synonymised with Epichorista emphanes. George Hudson had shown that Harmologa achrosta represented the male of E. emphanes. Meyrick also confirmed the placement of this species in the genus Epichorista. In 1926 Charles E. Clarke, again thinking he was describing a new species, named this moth Epichorista candida. In 1928 Alfred Philpott also discussed and illustrated the male genitalia of this species.

Hudson synonymised Epichorista candida with Epichorista emphanes and went on to discuss and illustrate this species in his 1928 book The butterflies and moths of New Zealand. In 1939 Hudson described the larva of E. emphanes. This species is regarded as being taxonomically unresolved as it likely belongs to another genus. It is therefore also known as Epichorista (s.l.) emphanes. The female holotype specimen was collected by George Hudson at Mount Peel resting on snow at 5400 ft. John S. Dugdale states the holotype specimen for Proselena emphanes is not held at the Natural History Museum, London.

== Description ==
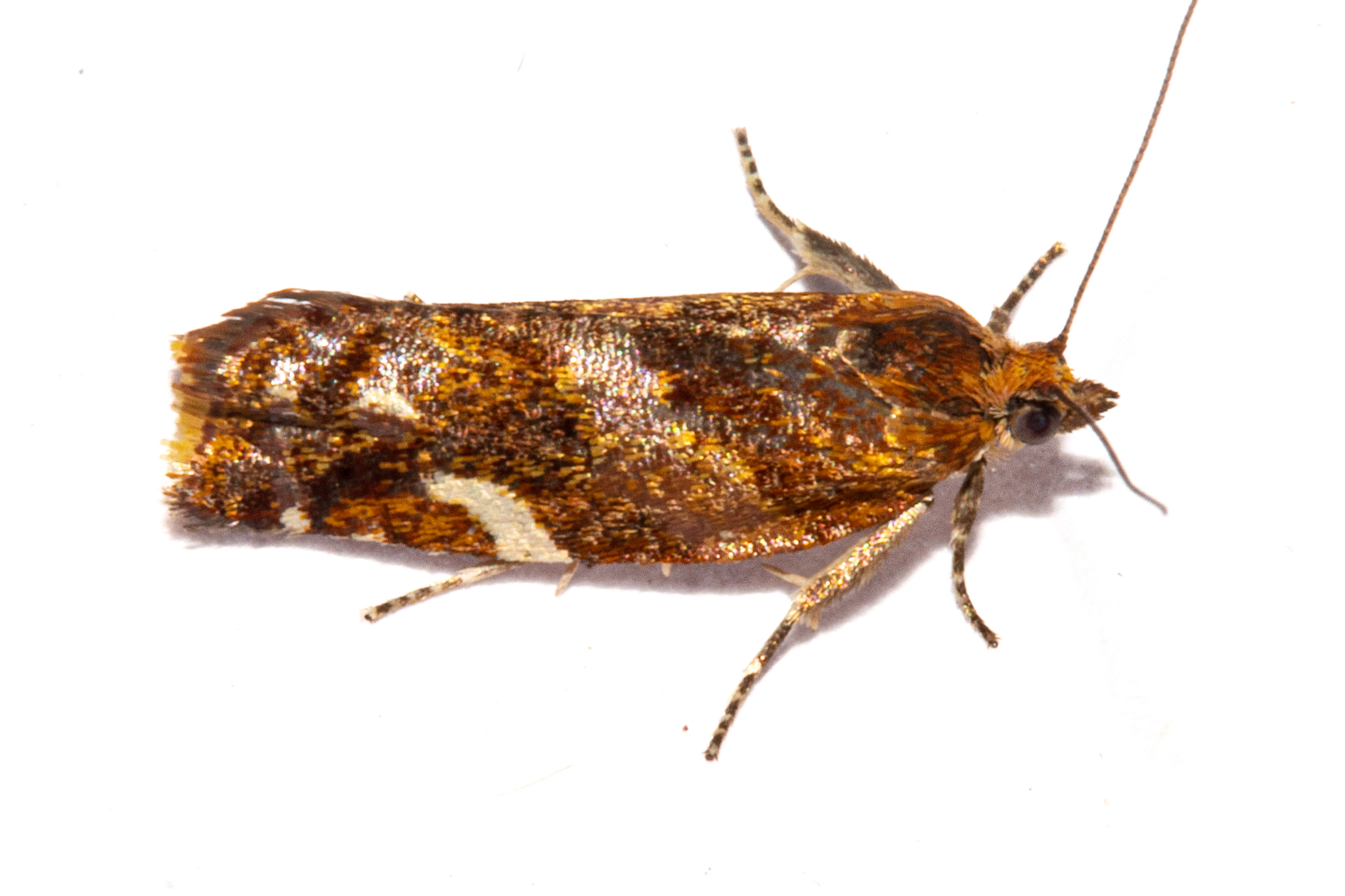
Living specimen.

Meyrick described the adult female of this species as follows:

♀. 14mm. Head and thorax deep ferruginous. Abdomen dark grey. Forewings elongate-oblong, costa moderately arched anteriorly, apex obtuse, termen nearly straight, vertical, rounded beneath; deep ferruginous, irregularly strewn with reddish-ochreous; space between basal patch and central fascia forming an oblique band glossed with ashy-purplish; central fascia edged posteriorly by an oblique white bar from costa, not reaching half across wing, beyond which is a triangular ochreous-yellow costal spot; a purplish-leaden-metallic streak before tornus, reaching half across wing, and a similar sub- terminal streak from costa to tornus: cilia ferruginous, with a purplish basal line, becoming yellow-whitish towards tips beneath apex. Hindwings dark fuscous, rather lighter towards base.

Meyrick described the adult male of this species as follows:

♂. 13 mm. Antennal ciliations 1 1/2. Forewings without costal fold; deep ferruginous, crossed by numerous oblique irregular series of very small subconfluent purplish-leaden-grey spots, without defined markings, but central fascia and costal patch sometimes indicated on costa. Hindwings blackish.

Meyrick pointed out that the male of the species differs considerably in appearance from the female of the species. Also, the adult females are highly variable in appearance. Hudson states that there is considerable variation in the brilliancy of the general colouring as well as in the extent and intensity of the silvery-white markings of the adult moths. Sometimes the reddish-brown ground colour of the fore-wings is replaced by dark grey. He goes on to state that generally speaking specimens from the North Island have the fore-wings considerably brighter and redder, the hind-wings darker, and the white costal marking seems to be often absent. One form has the whole of the median area of fore-wings greyish-cream colour, traversed by two ochreous-yellow bands.

Hudson described the larva of this species as follows:

The larva of Epichorista emphases, which feeds on Nothofagus menziesi, is about 1/2 inch in length; dull reddish-brown above, yellowish beneath; a broad yellow lateral line and ridge; head bright reddish-brown; segment 2 with very pronounced dark brown horny dorsal plate; segments 3 and 4 with six yellow dots rest of segments with eight yellow dots, except terminal segment which has no dots.

Illustrations of Epichorista emphanes
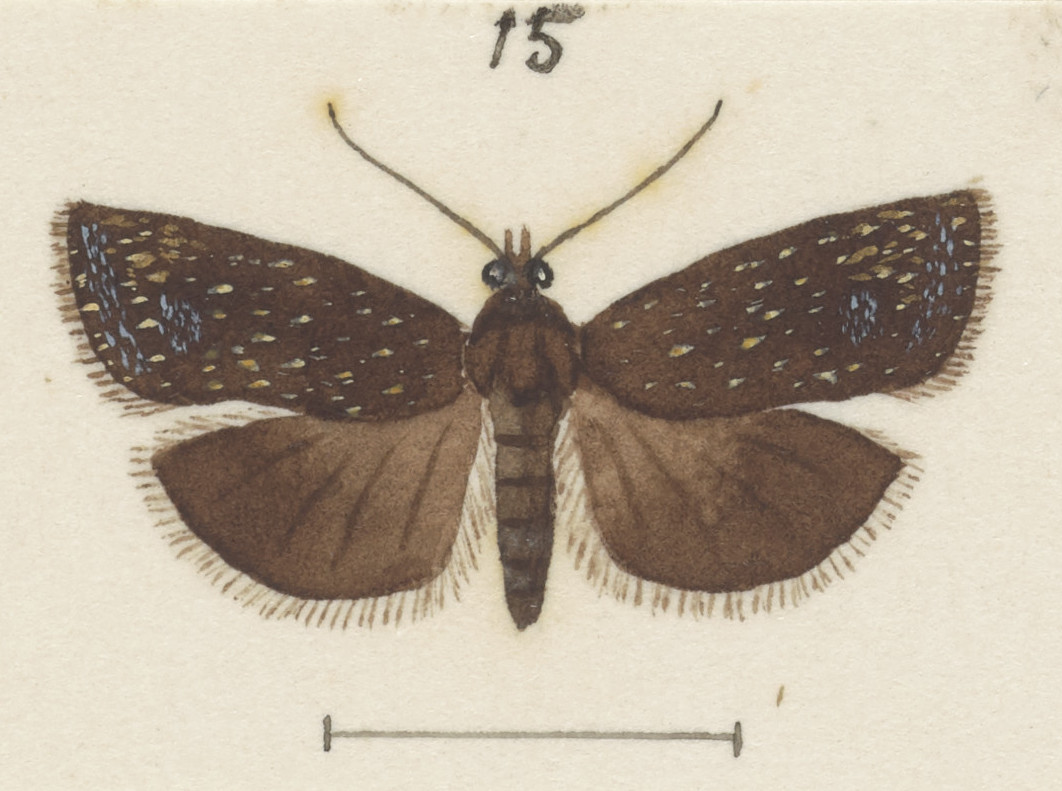
Male

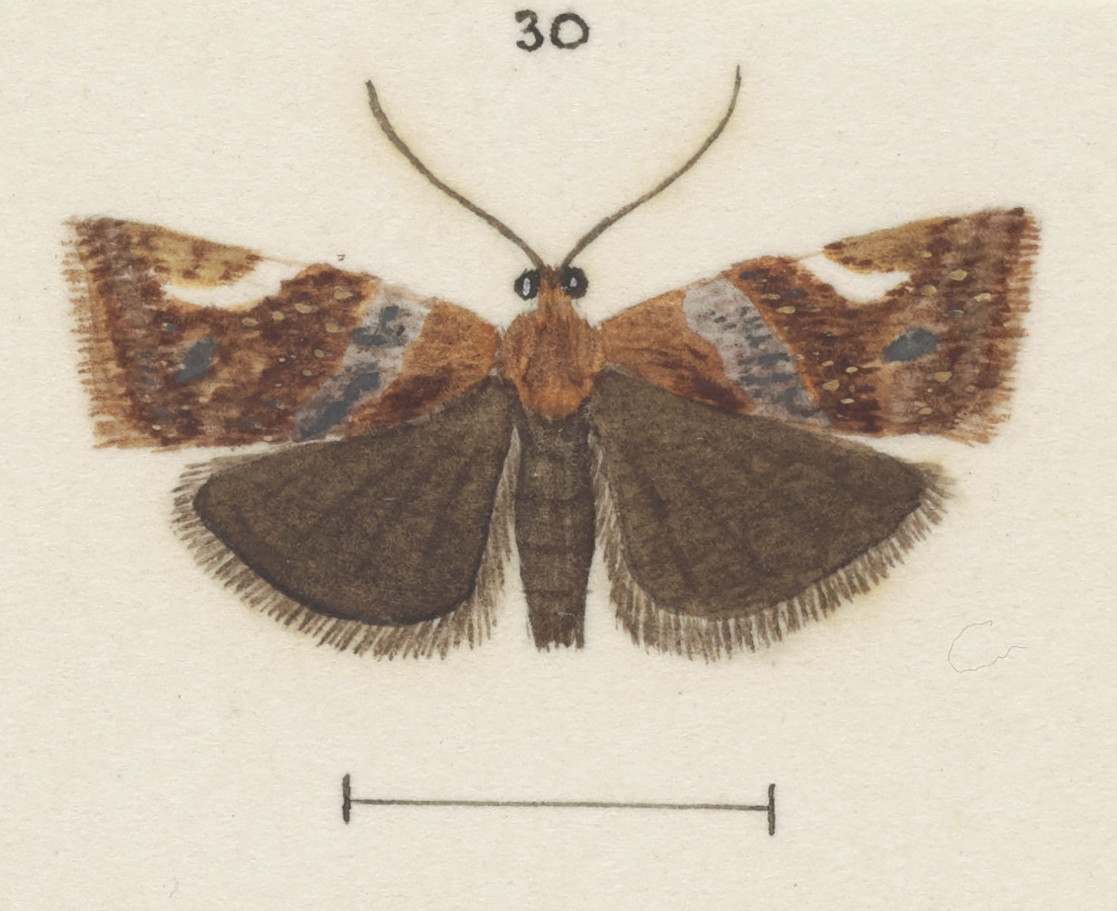
Female variety

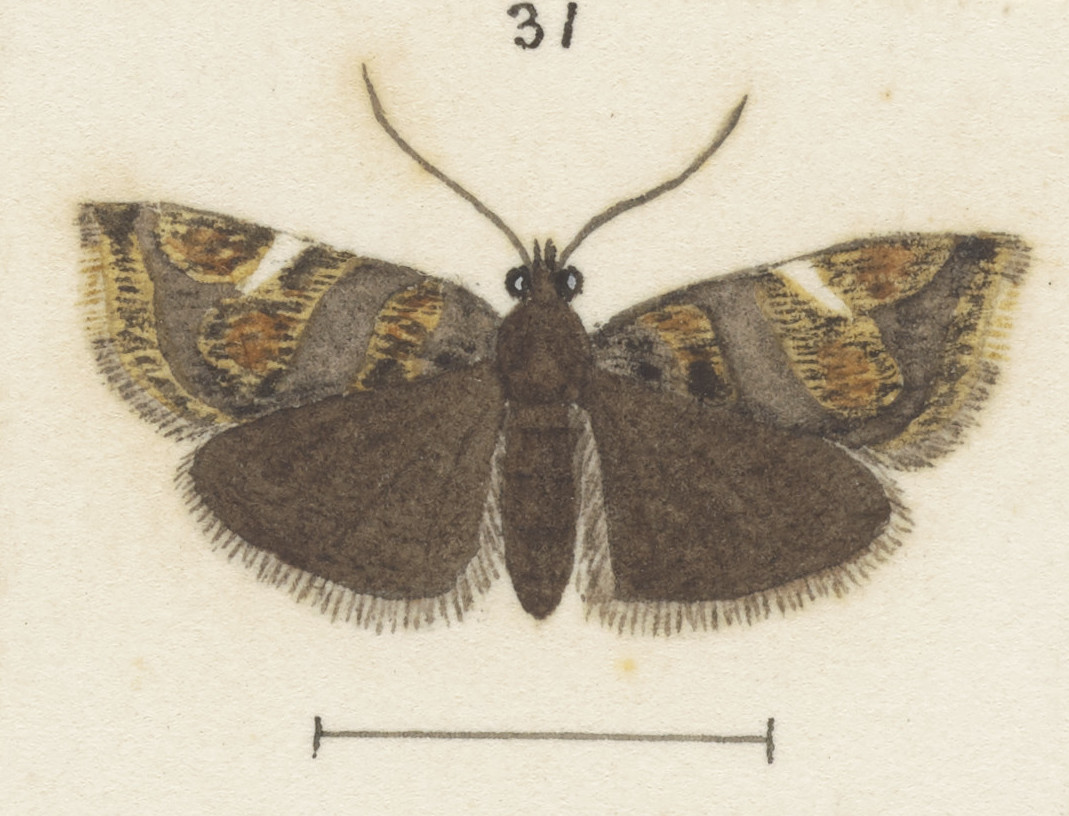
Female variety

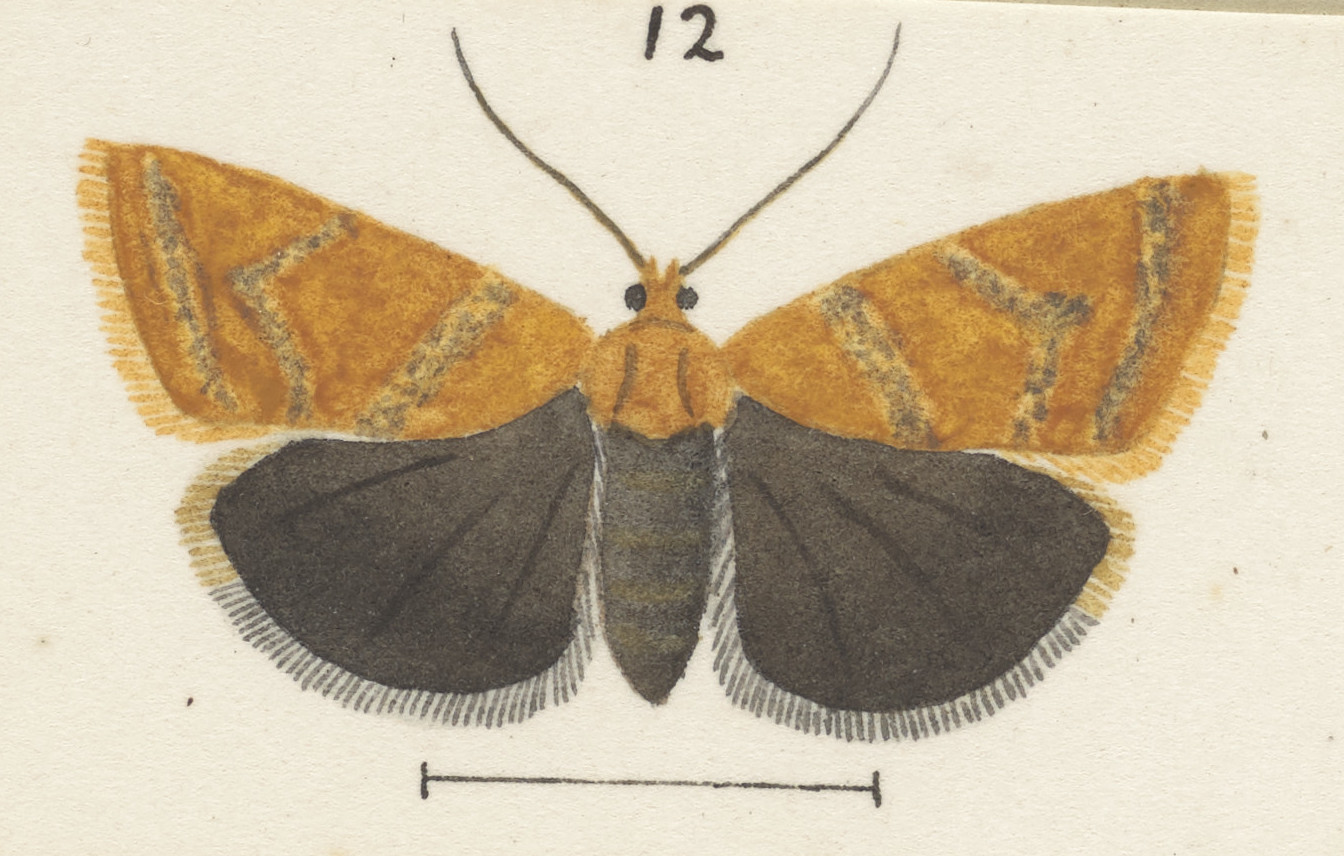
Female variety

== Distribution ==
E. emphanes is endemic to New Zealand. It is found on the North and South Islands at a wide range of altitudes. Hudson states specimens can be found at the upper limit of native beech forest growth.

== Habitat and hosts ==
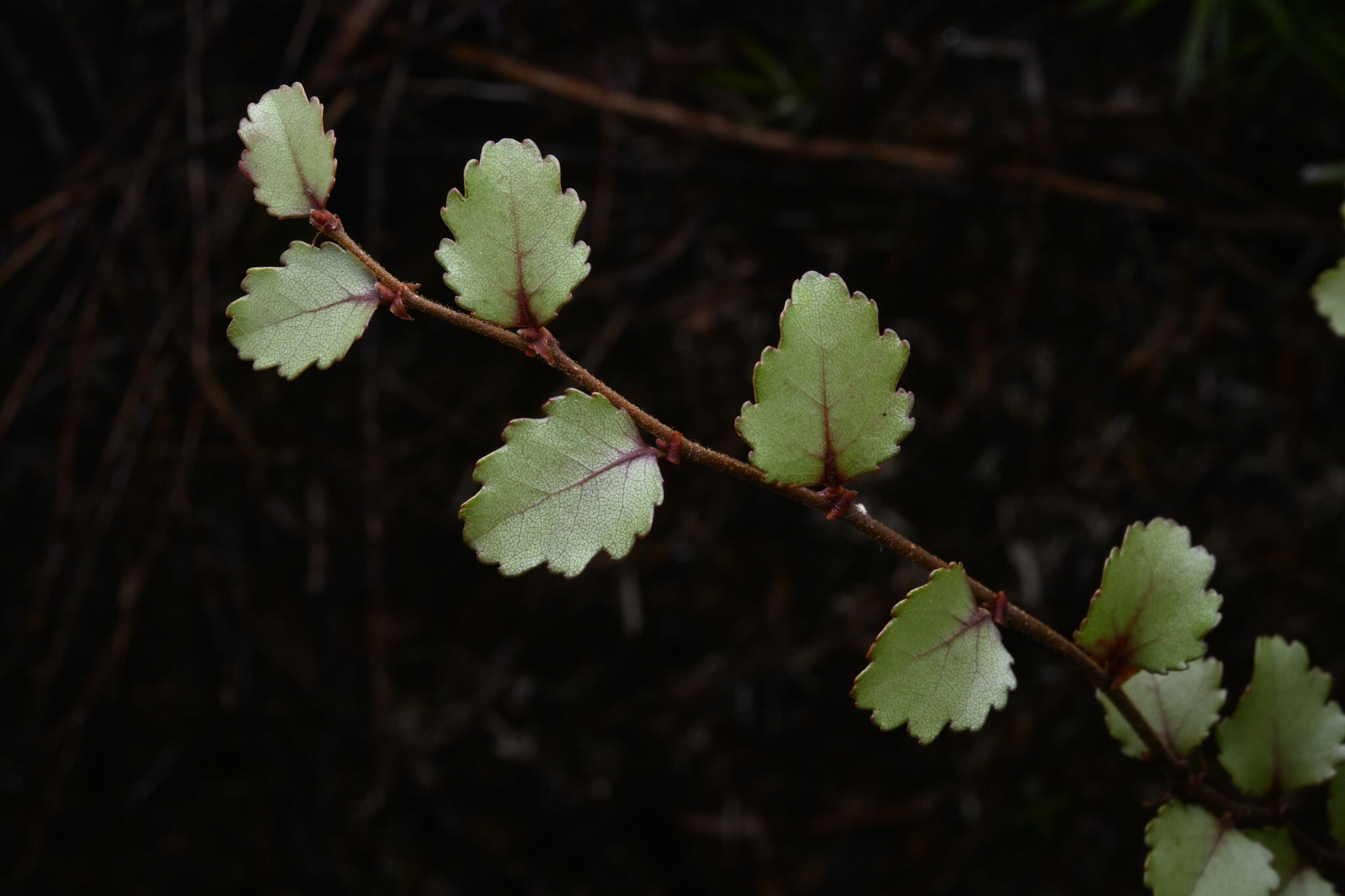
Larval host L. menziesii.

This species inhabits native beech forests. Adults can be found frequenting open glades in those forests or alternatively flying amongst the tops of beech trees. The larvae feed on the blossoms and newly emerged leaves of native beech trees. They have been recorded feeding on species in the genus Nothofagus including Nothofagus menziesii.

== Behaviour ==
The larva is very active, fastening the leaves together with silk and living between them. The pupa is enclosed between two joined leaves. Adults of this species are on the wing commonly from November until February. They are day flying and are particularly active in hot sunshine.

== Enemies ==
The larvae of this moth are larval hosts for species of parasitic hymenoptera.
