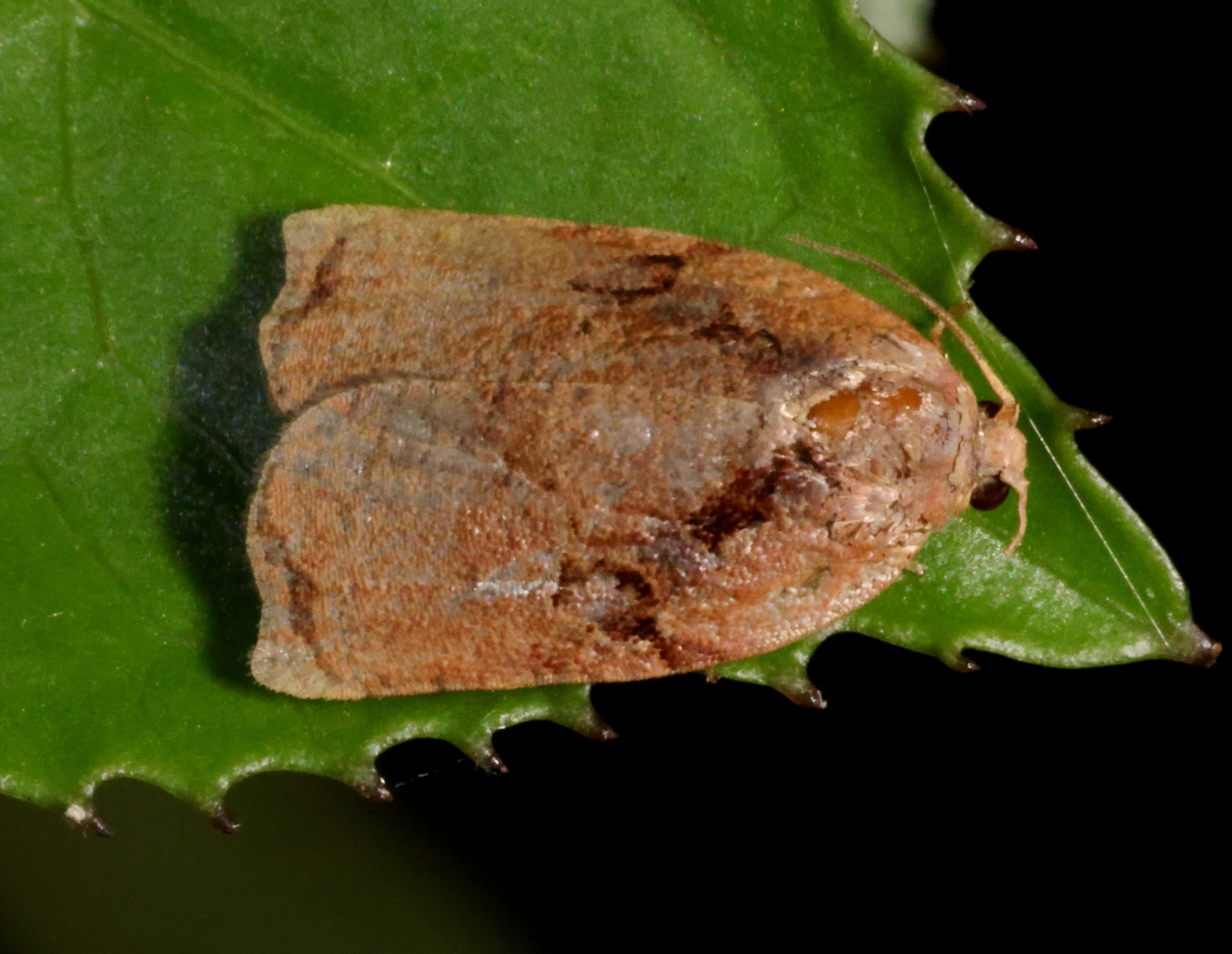

Scientific classification
- Kingdom: Animalia
- Phylum: Arthropoda
- Class: Insecta
- Order: Lepidoptera
- Family: Tortricidae
- Genus: Homona
- Species: H. eductana

Binomial name
- Homona eductana (Walker, 1863)

Synonyms
- Pandemis eductana Walker, 1863; Cacoecia permutata Meyrick, 1928

= Homona eductana =

Species of moth

Homona eductana is a species of moth of the family Tortricidae. It is found in India (Hindostan, Andaman Islands), Thailand, Malaysia, Singapore and China.

The larvae feed on Durio zibethinus, Garcinia mangostana, Castanopsis fissa, Quercus oidocarpa, Melastoma malabathricum, Sandoricum koetjabe, Eucalyptus deglupta, Allophylus, Dimocarpus longan, Litchi chinensis, Nephelium lappaceum, Theobroma cacao, Phaseolus, Morus, Camellia, Psidium guajava, Mangifera species (including Mangifera indica), Citrus species (including Citrus medica) and Bruguiera cylindrica.
