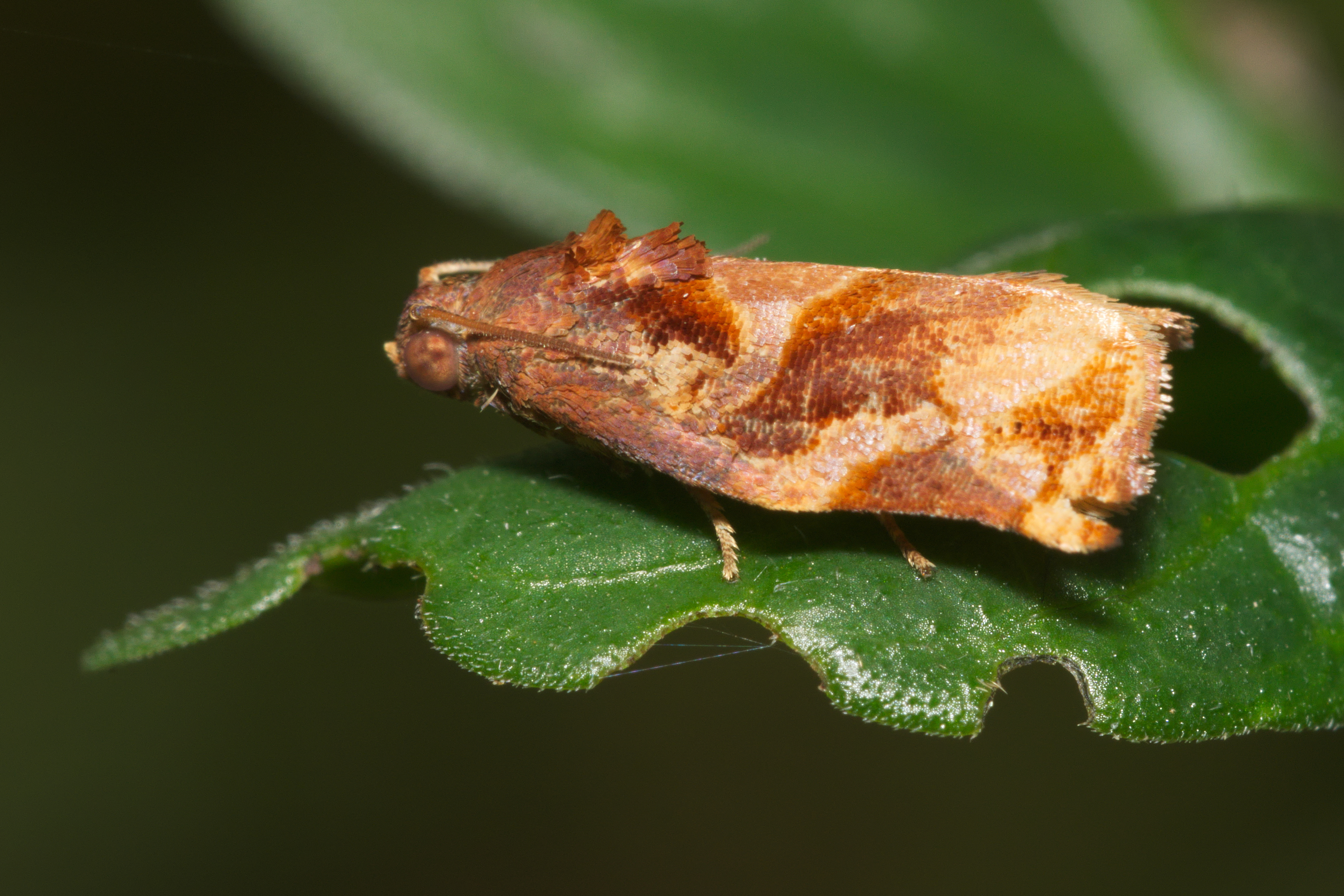
- Homona tabescens

Scientific classification
- Domain: Eukaryota
- Kingdom: Animalia
- Phylum: Arthropoda
- Class: Insecta
- Order: Lepidoptera
- Family: Tortricidae
- Subfamily: Tortricinae
- Tribe: Archipini
- Genus: Homona; Walker, 1863

Synonyms
- Ericia Walker, 1866 (preoccupied); Ericiana Strand, 1910; Godana Walker, 1866; Rhapsodica Meyrick, 1927

= Homona (moth) =

Genus of tortrix moths

Homona is a genus of moths belonging to the subfamily Tortricinae of the family Tortricidae.

== Species ==
- Homona aestivana (Walker, 1866)
- Homona anopta Diakonoff, 1983
- Homona antitona (Meyrick, 1927)
- Homona apiletica Meyrick, 1934
- Homona auriga (Durrant, 1915)
- Homona bakeri Diakonoff, 1968
- Homona baolocana Razowski, 2008
- Homona bicornis Diakonoff, 1968
- Homona biscutata Meyrick, 1931
- Homona blaiki Razowski, 2013
- Homona brachysema Diakonoff, 1983
- Homona coffearia (Nietner, 1861)
- Homona despotis Diakonoff, 1983
- Homona difficilis (Meyrick, 1928)
- Homona eductana (Walker, 1863)
- Homona encausta (Meyrick, 1907)
- Homona fatalis Meyrick, 1936
- Homona fistulata Meyrick, 1910
- Homona intermedia Diakonoff, 1948
- Homona issikii Yasuda, 1962
- Homona magnanima Diakonoff, 1948
- Homona mermerodes Meyrick, 1910
- Homona nakaoi Yasuda, 1969
- Homona obtusuncus Razowski, 2013
- Homona parvanima Razowski, 2008
- Homona phanaea Meyrick, 1910
- Homona polyarcha Meyrick, 1924
- Homona polystriana Razowski, 2008
- Homona privigena Razowski, 2013
- Homona saclava (Mabille, 1900)
- Homona salaconis (Meyrick, 1912)
- Homona scutina Diakonoff, 1948
- Homona secura (Meyrick, 1910)
- Homona spargotis Meyrick, 1910
- Homona superbana Kuznetsov, 1992
- Homona tabescens (Meyrick, 1921)
- Homona trachyptera Diakonoff, 1941
- Homona umbrigera Diakonoff, 1952
- Homona wetan Diakonoff, 1941

== Former species ==
- Homona cyanombra Meyrick, 1935
- Homona hylaeana Ghesquire, 1940
- Homona myriosema Meyrick, 1936

== See also ==
- List of Tortricidae genera
