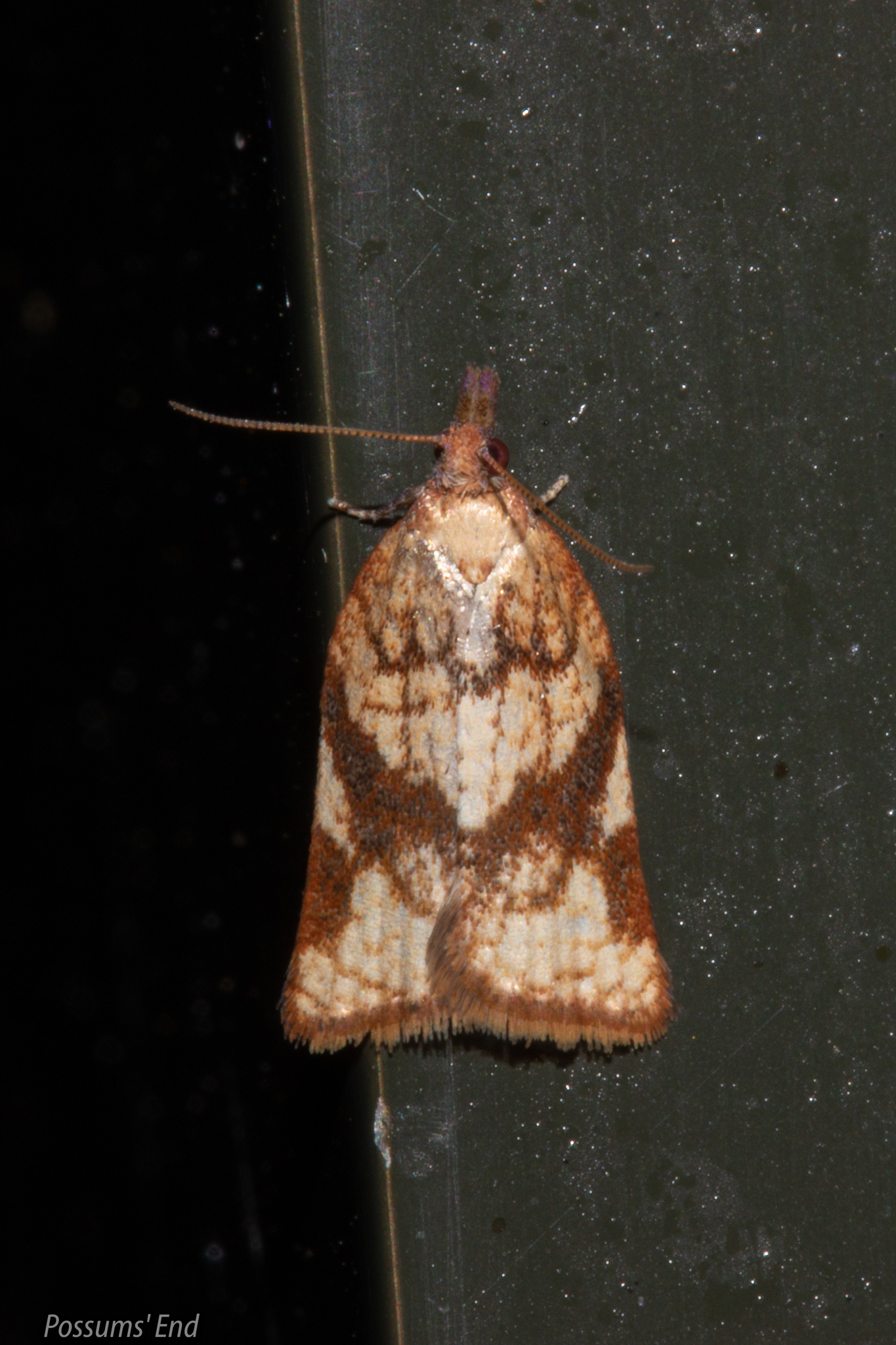
- Catamacta gavisana

Scientific classification
- Kingdom: Animalia
- Phylum: Arthropoda
- Clade: Pancrustacea
- Class: Insecta
- Order: Lepidoptera
- Family: Tortricidae
- Tribe: Archipini
- Genus: Catamacta; Meyrick, 1911

= Catamacta =

Genus of tortrix moths

Catamacta is a genus of moths belonging to the subfamily Tortricinae of the family Tortricidae. This genus is endemic to New Zealand. It was first described by Edward Meyrick in 1911.

== Species ==
- Catamacta alopecana (Meyrick, 1885)
- Catamacta gavisana (Walker, 1863)
- Catamacta lotinana (Meyrick, 1883)
- Catamacta rureana (Felder & Rogenhofer, 1875)
- Catamacta scrutatrix Meyrick, 1912

== Former species ==
- Catamacta imbriculata Meyrick, 1938
- Catamacta manticopa Meyrick, 1934

== See also ==
- List of Tortricidae genera
