= Leontochroma =

Scientific classification
- Kingdom: Animalia
- Phylum: Arthropoda
- Class: Insecta
- Order: Lepidoptera
- Family: Tortricidae
- Tribe: Archipini
- Genus: Leontochroma; Walsingham, 1900

Synonyms
- Rhapsidoca Meyrick, 1927; Rhapsodica Meyrick, 1927

Genus of tortrix moths

Leontochroma is a genus of moths belonging to the subfamily Tortricinae of the family Tortricidae.

== Species ==
- Leontochroma aurantiacum Walsingham, 1900
- Leontochroma percornutum Diakonoff, 1976
- Leontochroma suppurpuratum Walsingham, 1900
- Leontochroma viridochraceum Walsingham, 1900

== Former species ==
- Leontochroma antitona (Meyrick, 1927)

== See also ==
- List of Tortricidae genera
