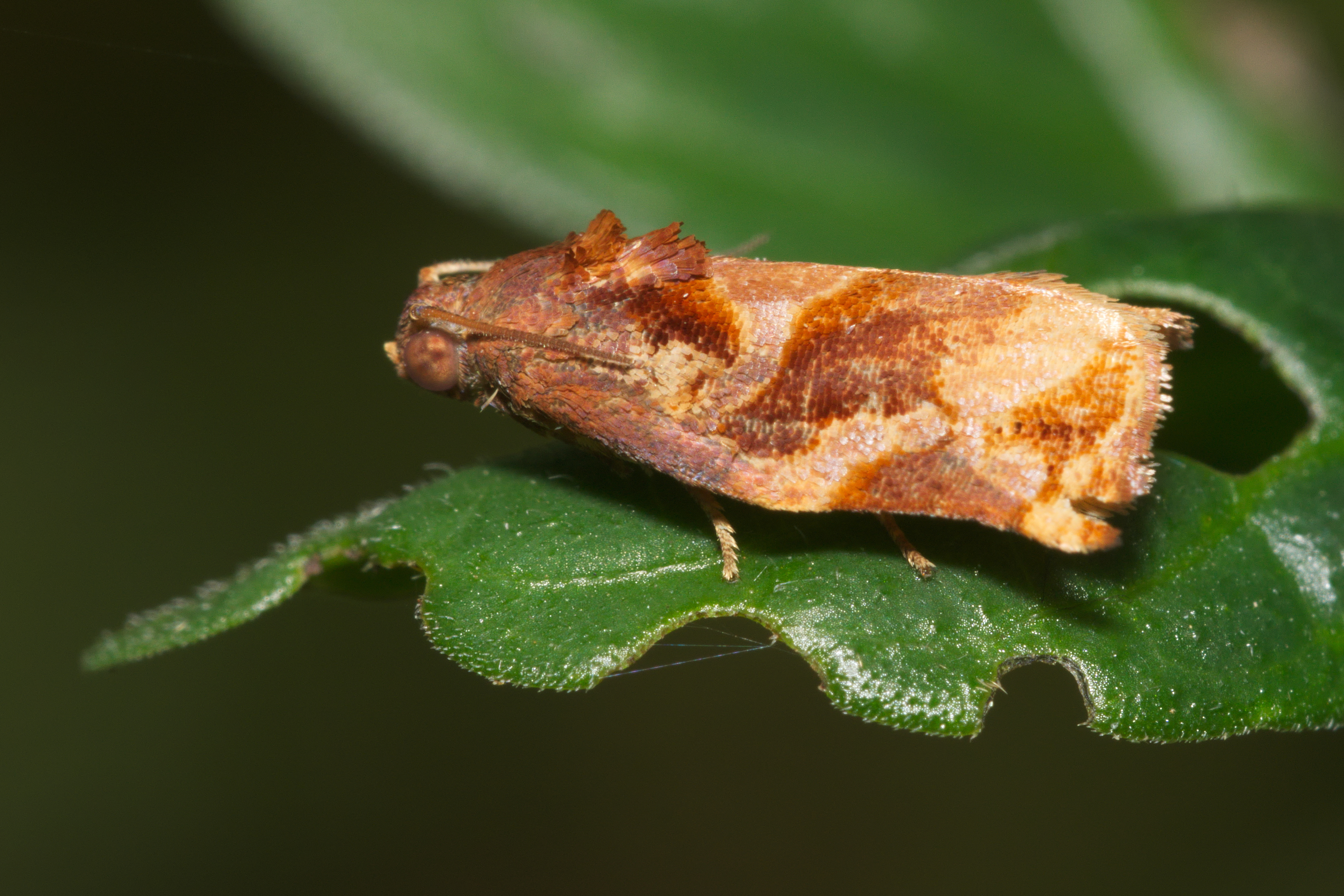
- Homona tabescens

Scientific classification
- Kingdom: Animalia
- Phylum: Arthropoda
- Class: Insecta
- Order: Lepidoptera
- Family: Tortricidae
- Genus: Homona
- Species: H. tabescens

Binomial name
- Homona tabescens (Meyrick, 1921)

Synonyms
- Cacoecia tabescens Meyrick, 1921; Archips tabescens

= Homona tabescens =

Species of moth

Homona tabescens is a species of moth of the family Tortricidae. It is found in south-east Asia, where it has been recorded from Java, Sabah, China, Thailand, Malaysia, New Guinea and Vietnam.

The larvae feed on a wide range of plants and have been recorded feeding on Durio zibethinus, Averrhoa carambola, Mangifera indica, Araucaria cunninghamii, Rubroshorea leprosula, Bridelia species, Acacia mangium, Castanopsis fissa, Cinnamomum verum, Lagerstroemia species (including Lagerstroemia speciosa), Abelmoschus esculentus, Melastoma malabathricum, Cajanus cajan, Artocarpus heterophyllus, Psidium guajava, Pinus caribaea, Pinus patula, Citrus species, Solanum melongena, Calophyllum inophyllum, Jatropha species, Gossypium species, Eucalyptus alba and Lantana camara.
