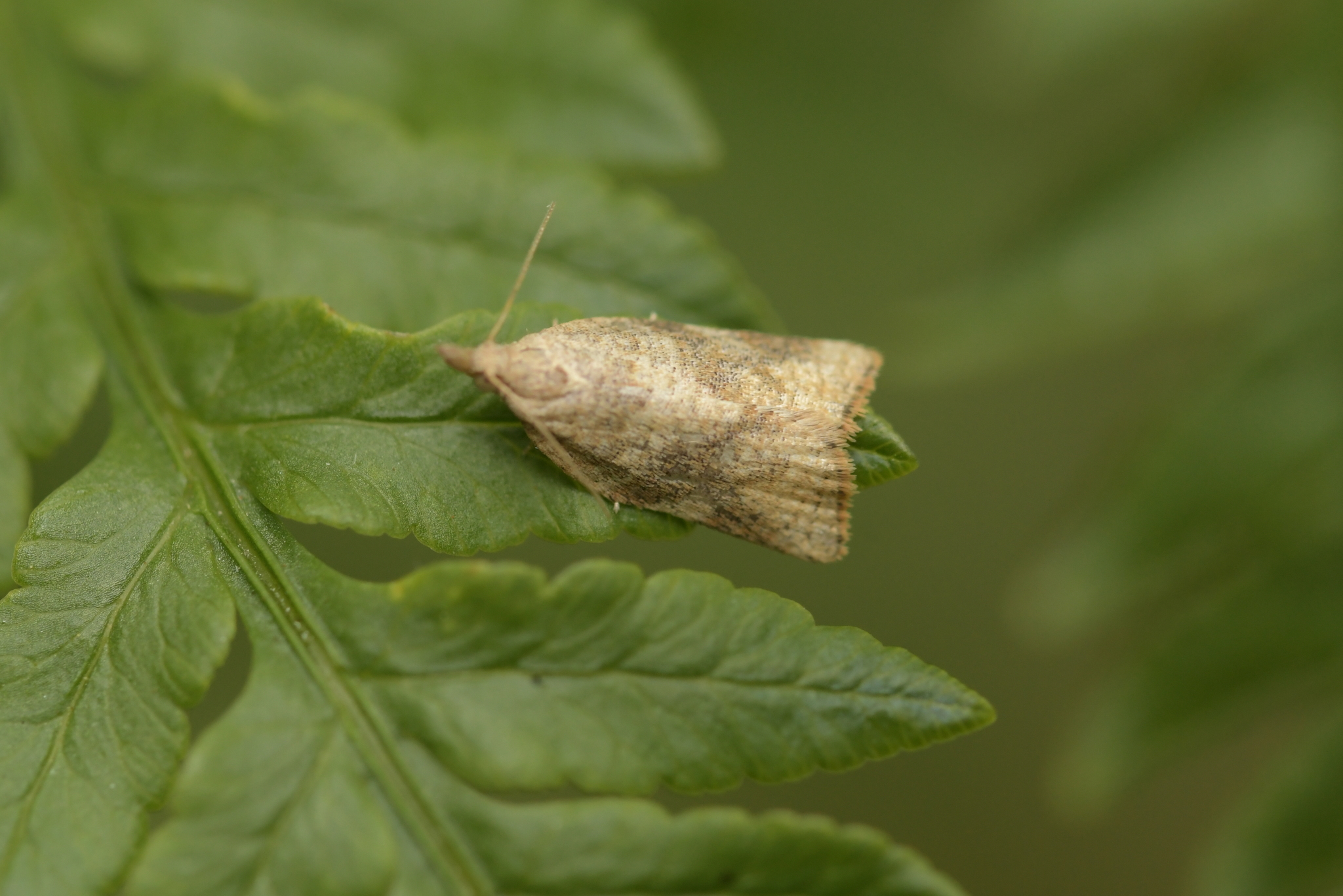

Scientific classification
- Kingdom: Animalia
- Phylum: Arthropoda
- Clade: Pancrustacea
- Class: Insecta
- Order: Lepidoptera
- Family: Tortricidae
- Genus: Catamacta
- Species: C. gavisana

Binomial name
- Catamacta gavisana (Walker, 1863)

Synonyms
- Pandemis gavisana Walker, 1863; Tortrix innotatana Walker, 1863; Conchylis marginana Walker, 1863; Pyrgotis conditana Meyrick (nec Walker); Adoxophyes conditana Meyrick (nec Walker); Capua aoristana Meyrick, 1881; Pyrgotis porphyreana Meyrick, 1881

= Catamacta gavisana =

Species of moth endemic to New Zealand

Catamacta gavisana is a species of moth of the family Tortricidae. It was first described by Francis Walker in 1863. It is endemic to New Zealand and can be found throughout the country. This species inhabits wooded areas and domestic gardens. Larvae have been recorded feeding on species in the genera Olearia, Coprosma, Leptospermum, Melicytus and Genista. The larvae feeds in a light silken tube amongst spun together leaves of its host plants. The pupa is enclosed in a thin, firm, white, silken cocoon. Adults can be seen on the wing all through the year and are attracted to light. In appearance adults of this species are extraordinarily variable and there are considerable differences between the sexes. One distinguishing feature that can assist with the identification of this moth is the pale, often triangular shaped mark, on the leading edge of the forewings. However in some moths this mark is entirely absent.

== Taxonomy ==
This species was first described by Francis Walker in 1863 and originally named Pandemis gavisana. In 1911 Edward Meyrick placed this species in the genus Catamacta. It is the type species for the genus Catamacta by original designation.

In 1863 Walker, thinking he was describing new species, named this moth Tortrix? innotatana. Meyrick synonymised this name with C. gavisana in 1911. Again in 1863 Walker also named this moth Conchylis marginana. Meyrick synonymised this name with Pandemis gavisana in 1881. However in the same publication Meyrick, thinking he was describing new species, named this moth Pyrgotis porphyreana and Capua aoristana. He also described this species as belonging to Pyrgotis conditana. Pyrgotis porphyreana and Capua aoristana were synonymised by Meyrick in 1883 as synonym of Adoxophyes conditana (in the sense of Meyrick). Adoxophyes conditana was synonymised by Meyrick in 1911 with Catamacta gavisana.

George Hudson discussed and illustrated this species under the name Catamacta gavisana in his 1928 book The butterflies and moths of New Zealand. Also in 1928 Alfred Philpott discussed and illustrated the male genitalia of this species. The female holotype specimen, collected by Daniel Bolton in Auckland, is held at the Natural History Museum, London.

== Description ==
Hudson described this species as follows:

The expansion of the wings varies from slightly over 1/2 inch to slightly over 5/8 inch. In the male the fore-wings are rather broad, triangular, the costa very slightly bent and the termen oblique; the colour and markings are very variable as described below. The hind-wings are pale grey more or less mottled with darker grey; the cilia are pale grey. The female has the forewings rather long, the costa strongly arched towards the base, slightly curved beyond the middle, the apex somewhat produced and the termen slightly curved and rather oblique; the colour and markings vary as described below. The hind-wings are white, with the apex slightly tinged with ochreous, and the cilia white.

Hudson stated that this species is extraordinarily variable and there are considerable differences between the sexes. One distinguishing feature that can assist with the identification of this moth is the pale, often triangular shaped mark on the leading edge of the forewings. However this feature can be absent.

Hudson listed several different forms of both the male and female of this species.

For the male, the first form he described had forewings that were very pale ochreous-grey, costa margined with brown to about 4; often a rather large brown spot on the costa before the apex; except a pale basal area, the rest of the wing is more or less dappled with light brown.

The male second form has fore-wings darker with the markings yellowish-brown and several conspicuous white spots on the costa.

The male third form has fore-wings uniform pale brownish-grey, the termen and basal half of the costa edged with very dark blackish-brown.

The male fourth form has fore-wings uniform cream colour with the basal half of the costa edged with brown.

The male fifth form has fore-wings dark blackish-brown with a large, white, triangular spot on the costa at about 2 and a smaller one before the apex. Hind-wings dark grey. This is a very dark and distinct variety but every gradation occurs between it and the ordinary pale forms (1 and 2).

=== Gallery of male forms ===
Male first form.

Male second form.

Male fifth form.

For the female, Hudson explains that the usual form has the fore-wings pale straw-colour with the veins marked in brown and a number of fine transverse markings often roughly dividing the wing into a number of squares; there is a rather darker basal area; a broad diffused band from 4 of costa to 3 of dorsum and a large brown patch on the costa, just before the apex, the two markings touching in such a manner as to leave a pale spot between them on the costa.

A second female form is similar to the above but without the veins or fine transverse markings in brown.

A third female form also resembles the usual form but has the brown markings much brighter and redder.

A fourth female form has fore-wings that are pale brown, slightly tinged with purplish-grey and with no markings except several cream-coloured spots on the costa.

=== Gallery of female forms ===
Female usual form.

Female second form.

Female third form.

Meyrick believed this species is distinguishable from Catamacta lotinana in the female by the white hind-wings and different form, and in the male by the conspicuous dark basal half of the cilia of the fore-wings, the usually perceptible basal patch and costal spot, and the much smaller size. Hudson also pointed out that this species could be distinguished from similar appearing species as it lacks a crest on the thorax.

The larva is moderately stout, cylindrical, slightly tapering at both ends; pale greyish-green, spots concolorous; head pale greyish-ochreous, lateral margins dark fuscous, mouth spotted with dark fuscous; second segment greenish-whitish, with an ochreous-tinged dorsal plate; anal segment greenish-whitish, with a small ochreous-tinged plate.

== Distribution ==
This species is endemic to New Zealand and is found throughout the country..

== Habitat and hosts ==
C. gavisana inhabits wooded areas and domestic gardens. The larvae are polyphagous. Larvae have been recorded feeding on species in the genera Olearia, Coprosma , Leptospermum, Melicytus and Genista.

== Behaviour ==
The larvae feeds in a light silken tube amongst spun together leaves of its host plants. The pupa is enclosed in a thin, firm, white, silken cocoon. Adults are attracted to light. David E. Gaskin hypothesised that there are likely two generations in a year. Adults can be seen on the wing all through the year.
