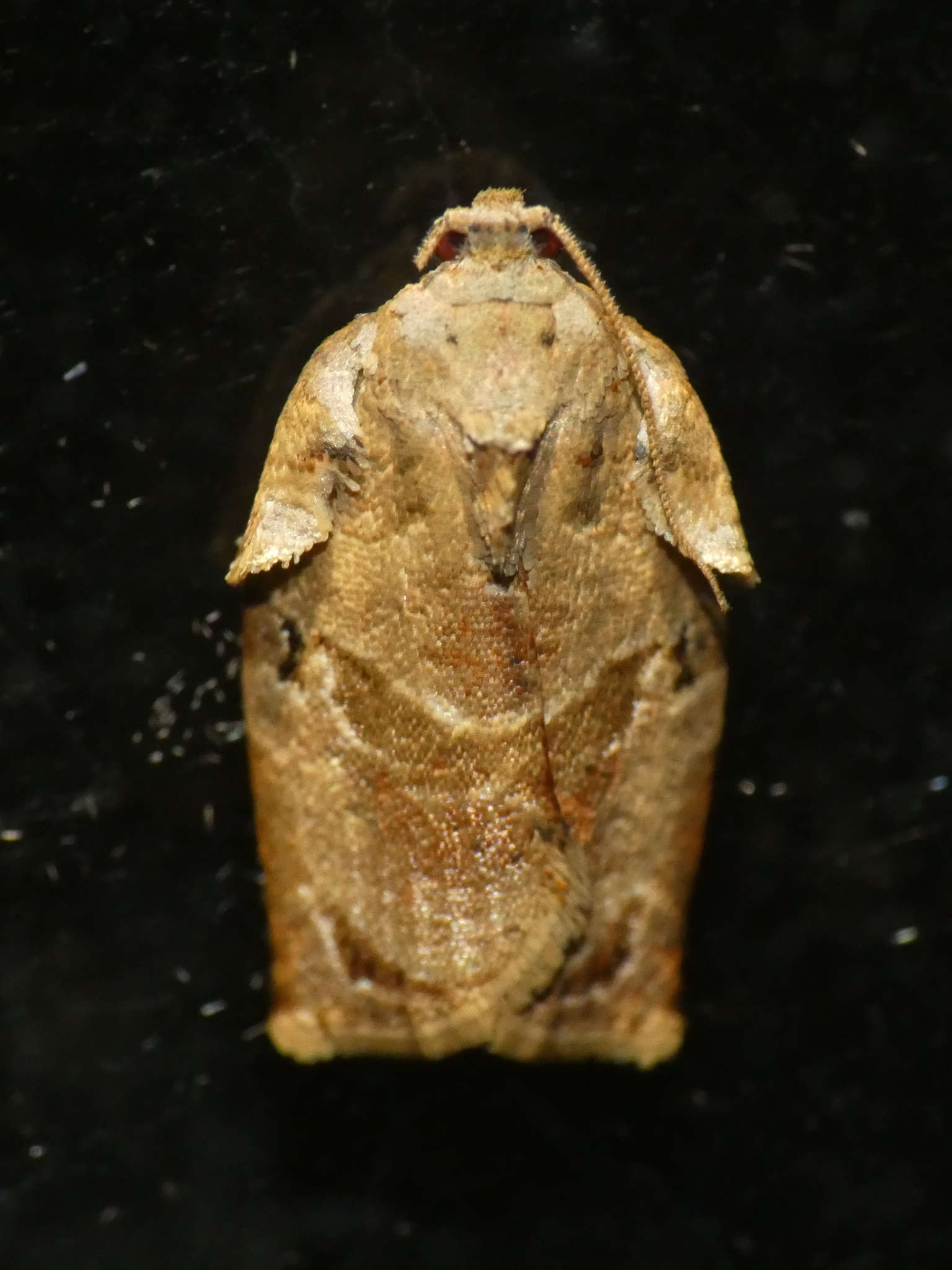

Scientific classification
- Kingdom: Animalia
- Phylum: Arthropoda
- Class: Insecta
- Order: Lepidoptera
- Family: Tortricidae
- Genus: Homona
- Species: H. trachyptera

Binomial name
- Homona trachyptera Diakonoff, 1941

= Homona trachyptera =

Species of moth

Homona trachyptera is a species of moth of the family Tortricidae. It is found in New Guinea, as well as Australia, where it has been recorded from Queensland.

The wingspan is 20–23 mm for males and about 30 mm for females.

The larvae feed on a wide range of plants, including Ficus copiosa, Ficus wassa, Theobroma cacao, Camellia sinensis, Kleinhovia hospita, Psidium guajava, Mangifera species (including Mangifera indica), Ricinus communis, Gliricidia, Sesbania, Coffea and Citrus species.
