= Lozotaenia exomilana =

Scientific classification
- Domain: Eukaryota
- Kingdom: Animalia
- Phylum: Arthropoda
- Class: Insecta
- Order: Lepidoptera
- Family: Tortricidae
- Genus: Lozotaenia
- Species: L. exomilana

Binomial name
- Lozotaenia exomilana Franclemont, 1986

Species of moth

Lozotaenia exomilana is a species of moth of the family Tortricidae. It is found in the United States, where it has been recorded from North Carolina and Virginia.

The wingspan is 11–13 mm. Adults have been recorded on wing from June to July.
