= Lozotaenia costinotana =

Scientific classification
- Kingdom: Animalia
- Phylum: Arthropoda
- Clade: Pancrustacea
- Class: Insecta
- Order: Lepidoptera
- Family: Tortricidae
- Genus: Lozotaenia
- Species: L. costinotana

Binomial name
- Lozotaenia costinotana Franclemont, 1986

Species of moth

Lozotaenia costinotana is a species of moth of the family Tortricidae. It is found in North America, where it has been recorded from Maine, Manitoba, Minnesota and Quebec.

The wingspan is 18–23 mm. Adults have been recorded on wing from July to August.
