= Homona auriga =

Scientific classification
- Domain: Eukaryota
- Kingdom: Animalia
- Phylum: Arthropoda
- Class: Insecta
- Order: Lepidoptera
- Family: Tortricidae
- Genus: Homona
- Species: H. auriga

Binomial name
- Homona auriga (Durrant, 1915)

Synonyms
- Tortrix auriga Durrant, 1915

Species of moth

Homona auriga is a species of moth of the family Tortricidae. It is found on New Guinea, where it has been recorded from Papua, Indonesia.
