= Homona bicornis =

Scientific classification
- Domain: Eukaryota
- Kingdom: Animalia
- Phylum: Arthropoda
- Class: Insecta
- Order: Lepidoptera
- Family: Tortricidae
- Genus: Homona
- Species: H. bicornis

Binomial name
- Homona bicornis Diakonoff, 1968

Species of moth

Homona bicornis is a species of moth of the family Tortricidae. It is found in the Philippines on the island of Luzon.
