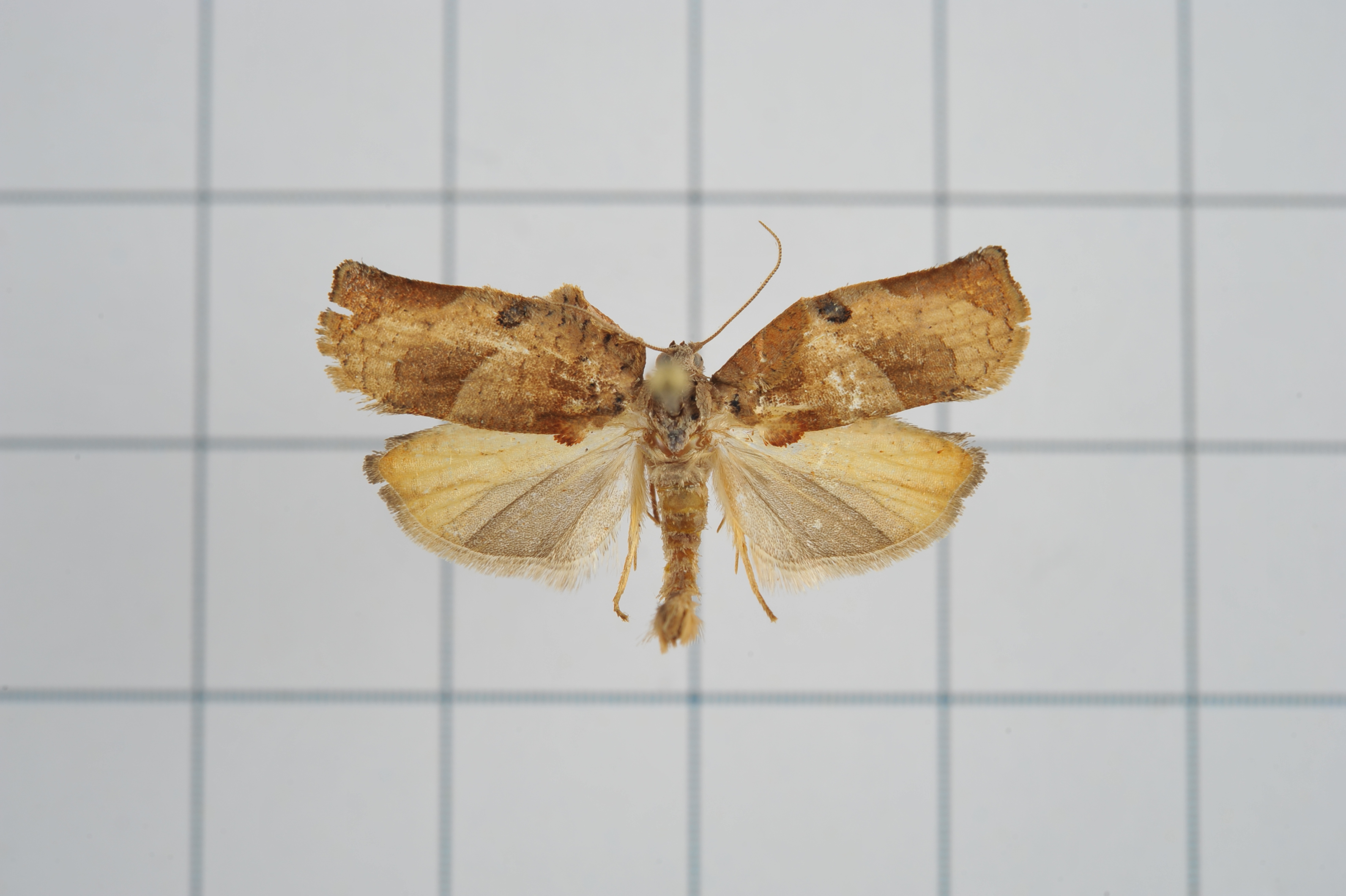

Scientific classification
- Kingdom: Animalia
- Phylum: Arthropoda
- Clade: Pancrustacea
- Class: Insecta
- Order: Lepidoptera
- Family: Tortricidae
- Genus: Homona
- Species: H. issikii

Binomial name
- Homona issikii Yasuda, 1962

Synonyms
- Choristoneura issikii

= Homona issikii =

Species of moth

Homona issikii is a moth of the family Tortricidae. It is found in China, the Russian Far East, Japan and Taiwan.

The wingspan is 20 mm. There are two generations per year in China with adults appearing in late May.

The larvae feed on Cryptomeria fortunei and Cryptomeria japonica.
