= Homona polystriana =

Scientific classification
- Kingdom: Animalia
- Phylum: Arthropoda
- Class: Insecta
- Order: Lepidoptera
- Family: Tortricidae
- Genus: Homona
- Species: H. polystriana

Binomial name
- Homona polystriana Razowski, 2008

Species of moth

Homona polystriana is a species of moth of the family Tortricidae. It is found in Vietnam.

The wingspan is about 23 mm.
