= Lozotaenia kumatai =

Scientific classification
- Domain: Eukaryota
- Kingdom: Animalia
- Phylum: Arthropoda
- Class: Insecta
- Order: Lepidoptera
- Family: Tortricidae
- Genus: Lozotaenia
- Species: L. kumatai

Binomial name
- Lozotaenia kumatai Oku, 1963

Species of moth

Lozotaenia kumatai is a species of moth of the family Tortricidae. It is found in Japan on the island of Hokkaido.

The wingspan is 22–24 mm.
