= Lozotaenia edwardi =

Scientific classification
- Kingdom: Animalia
- Phylum: Arthropoda
- Class: Insecta
- Order: Lepidoptera
- Family: Tortricidae
- Genus: Lozotaenia
- Species: L. edwardi

Binomial name
- Lozotaenia edwardi Razowski, 1999

Species of moth

Lozotaenia edwardi is a species of moth of the family Tortricidae. It is found in North Korea and Primorsky Krai in the Russian Far East.
