= Lozotaenia edwardsi =

Scientific classification
- Domain: Eukaryota
- Kingdom: Animalia
- Phylum: Arthropoda
- Class: Insecta
- Order: Lepidoptera
- Family: Tortricidae
- Genus: Lozotaenia
- Species: L. edwardsi

Binomial name
- Lozotaenia edwardsi (Bradley, 1965)

Synonyms
- Tortrix edwardsi Bradley, 1965

Species of moth

Lozotaenia edwardsi is a species of moth of the family Tortricidae. It is found in Uganda.
