= Leontochroma percornutum =

Scientific classification
- Domain: Eukaryota
- Kingdom: Animalia
- Phylum: Arthropoda
- Class: Insecta
- Order: Lepidoptera
- Family: Tortricidae
- Genus: Leontochroma
- Species: L. percornutum

Binomial name
- Leontochroma percornutum Diakonoff, 1976

Species of moth

Leontochroma percornutum is a species of moth of the family Tortricidae. It is found in China.
