= Lozotaenia perapposita =

Scientific classification
- Kingdom: Animalia
- Phylum: Arthropoda
- Class: Insecta
- Order: Lepidoptera
- Family: Tortricidae
- Genus: Lozotaenia
- Species: L. perapposita

Binomial name
- Lozotaenia perapposita Razowski, 1984

Species of moth

Lozotaenia perapposita is a species of moth of the family Tortricidae. It is found in Shanxi, China.
