= Homona bakeri =

Scientific classification
- Domain: Eukaryota
- Kingdom: Animalia
- Phylum: Arthropoda
- Class: Insecta
- Order: Lepidoptera
- Family: Tortricidae
- Genus: Homona
- Species: H. bakeri

Binomial name
- Homona bakeri Diakonoff, 1968

Species of moth

Homona bakeri is a species of moth of the family Tortricidae. It is found in the Philippines on the island of Luzon.

The larvae feed on Annona muricata.

== Etymology ==
The species is named for the late Professor Charles Fidler Baker.
