= Homona brachysema =

Scientific classification
- Domain: Eukaryota
- Kingdom: Animalia
- Phylum: Arthropoda
- Class: Insecta
- Order: Lepidoptera
- Family: Tortricidae
- Genus: Homona
- Species: H. brachysema

Binomial name
- Homona brachysema Diakonoff, 1983

Species of moth

Homona brachysema is a species of moth of the family Tortricidae. It is found on Sumatra in Indonesia.
