= Homona saclava =

Scientific classification
- Domain: Eukaryota
- Kingdom: Animalia
- Phylum: Arthropoda
- Class: Insecta
- Order: Lepidoptera
- Family: Tortricidae
- Genus: Homona
- Species: H. saclava

Binomial name
- Homona saclava (Mabille, 1900)

Synonyms
- Tortrix saclava Mabille, 1900

Species of moth

Homona saclava is a species of moth of the family Tortricidae. It is found in Madagascar.
