= Homona fatalis =

Scientific classification
- Kingdom: Animalia
- Phylum: Arthropoda
- Class: Insecta
- Order: Lepidoptera
- Family: Tortricidae
- Genus: Homona
- Species: H. fatalis

Binomial name
- Homona fatalis Meyrick, 1936

Species of moth

Homona fatalis is a species of moth of the family Tortricidae first described by Edward Meyrick in 1936. It is found on Seram and in Malaysia. The habitat consists of cultivated areas, lowland forests, bamboo and secondary forests.

The larvae feed on Acacia mangium, Cinnamomum verum, Coffea liberica, Citrus aurantiifolia and Theobroma cacao.
