= Homona superbana =

Scientific classification
- Domain: Eukaryota
- Kingdom: Animalia
- Phylum: Arthropoda
- Class: Insecta
- Order: Lepidoptera
- Family: Tortricidae
- Genus: Homona
- Species: H. superbana

Binomial name
- Homona superbana Kuznetsov, 1992

Species of moth

Homona superbana is a species of moth of the family Tortricidae. It is found in Vietnam.
