= Catamacta scrutatrix =

Scientific classification
- Domain: Eukaryota
- Kingdom: Animalia
- Phylum: Arthropoda
- Class: Insecta
- Order: Lepidoptera
- Family: Tortricidae
- Genus: Catamacta
- Species: C. scrutatrix

Binomial name
- Catamacta scrutatrix Meyrick, 1912

Species of moth

Catamacta scrutatrix is a species of moth of the family Tortricidae. It is found in South Africa.
