= Homona phanaea =

Scientific classification
- Kingdom: Animalia
- Phylum: Arthropoda
- Class: Insecta
- Order: Lepidoptera
- Family: Tortricidae
- Genus: Homona
- Species: H. phanaea

Binomial name
- Homona phanaea Meyrick, 1910

Species of moth

Homona phanaea is a species of moth of the family Tortricidae. It is found on the Solomon Islands, in New Guinea, on the St. Aignan Islands, the Kei Islands and possibly the Philippines.

The larvae feed on Ochroma pyramidale.
