= Lozotaenia straminea =

Scientific classification
- Kingdom: Animalia
- Phylum: Arthropoda
- Class: Insecta
- Order: Lepidoptera
- Family: Tortricidae
- Genus: Lozotaenia
- Species: L. straminea

Binomial name
- Lozotaenia straminea (Schawerda, 1936)

Synonyms
- Tortrix mabillana ab. straminea Schawerda, 1936; Lophoderus (Tortrix) mabilliana Ragonot, 1875; Lophoderus (Tortrix) mabiliana var. pistaciana Ragonot, 1875

Species of moth

Lozotaenia straminea is a species of moth of the family Tortricidae. It is found on Corsica and Sardinia. The wingspan is about 20 mm.
