= Homona apiletica =

Scientific classification
- Kingdom: Animalia
- Phylum: Arthropoda
- Class: Insecta
- Order: Lepidoptera
- Family: Tortricidae
- Genus: Homona
- Species: H. apiletica

Binomial name
- Homona apiletica Meyrick, 1934

Species of moth

Homona apiletica is a species of moth of the family Tortricidae. It is found in China.
