= Homona umbrigera =

Scientific classification
- Domain: Eukaryota
- Kingdom: Animalia
- Phylum: Arthropoda
- Class: Insecta
- Order: Lepidoptera
- Family: Tortricidae
- Genus: Homona
- Species: H. umbrigera

Binomial name
- Homona umbrigera Diakonoff, 1952

Species of moth

Homona umbrigera is a species of moth of the family Tortricidae. It is found on Sumba in Indonesia.
