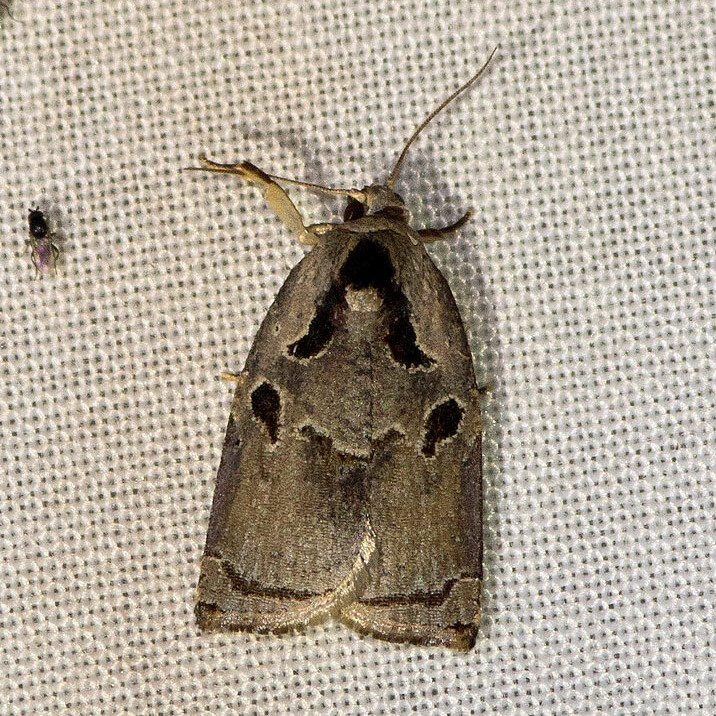

Scientific classification
- Kingdom: Animalia
- Phylum: Arthropoda
- Class: Insecta
- Order: Lepidoptera
- Family: Tortricidae
- Genus: Homona
- Species: H. salaconis

Binomial name
- Homona salaconis (Meyrick, 1912)

Synonyms
- Cacoecia salaconis Meyrick, 1912; Archips salaconis Diakonoff, 1967; Homona amphigona Meyrick, 1936; Cacoecia spilotoma Meyrick, 1921; Cacoecia xanthochroma Wileman & Stringer, 1929

= Homona salaconis =

Species of moth

Homona salaconis is a species of moth in the family Tortricidae that was first described by Edward Meyrick in 1912. It is found in the Philippines and Indonesia (Seram, Sumatra, Sulawesi and Western New Guinea). The habitat consists of cultivated areas and lowland forests.

The larvae feed on Elaeis guineensis, Theobroma cacao and Solanum species.
