= Leontochroma viridochraceum =

Scientific classification
- Domain: Eukaryota
- Kingdom: Animalia
- Phylum: Arthropoda
- Class: Insecta
- Order: Lepidoptera
- Family: Tortricidae
- Genus: Leontochroma
- Species: L. viridochraceum

Binomial name
- Leontochroma viridochraceum Walsingham, 1900

Synonyms
- Leontochroma attenuatum Yasuda, 1969

Species of moth

Leontochroma viridochraceum is a species of moth of the family Tortricidae. It is found in India (Sikkim) and Nepal.
