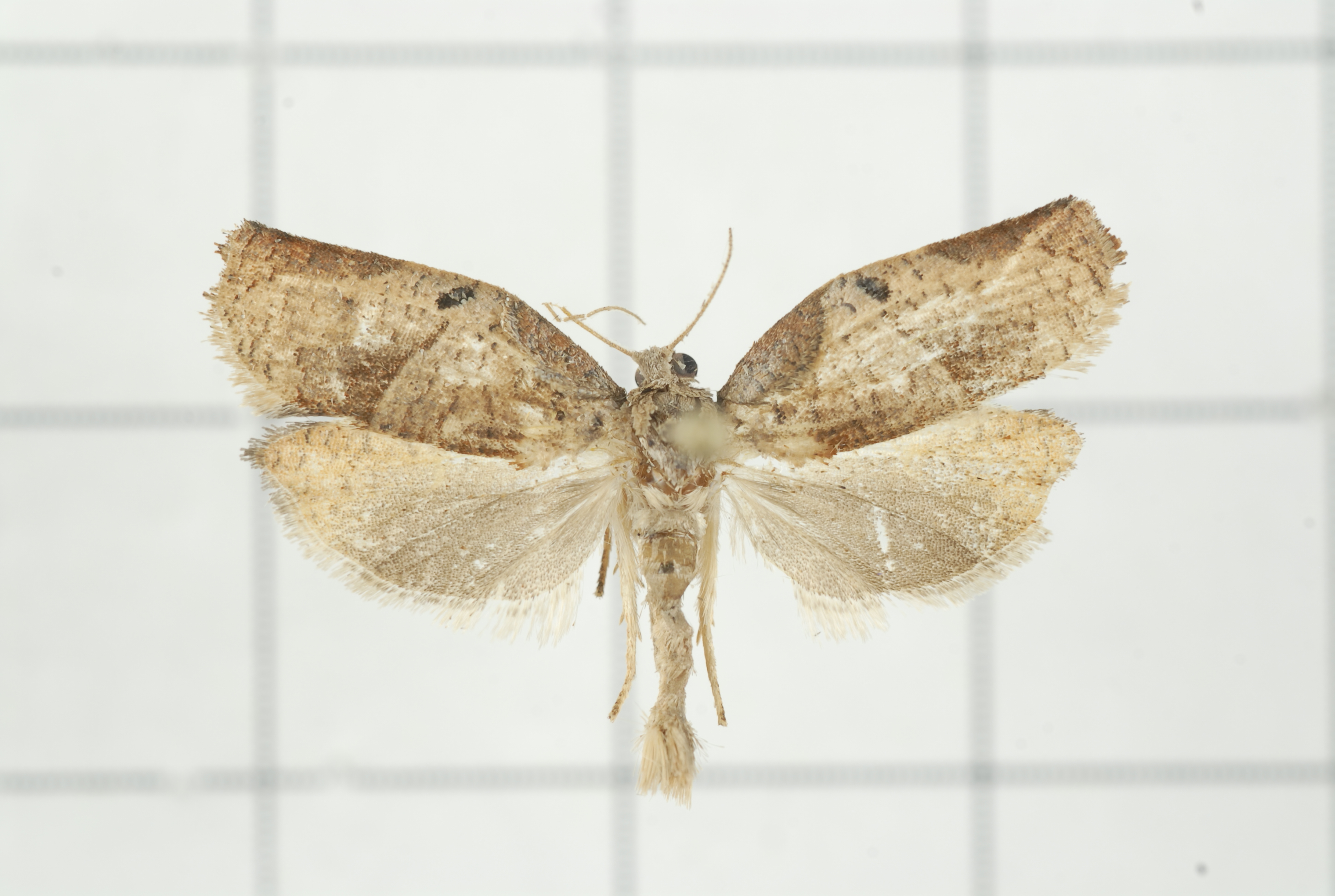

Scientific classification
- Domain: Eukaryota
- Kingdom: Animalia
- Phylum: Arthropoda
- Class: Insecta
- Order: Lepidoptera
- Family: Tortricidae
- Genus: Homona
- Species: H. magnanima

Binomial name
- Homona magnanima Diakonoff, 1948

= Homona magnanima =

Oriental tea tortrix moth

Species of moth

Homona magnanima, the Oriental tea tortrix moth, is a species of moth of the family Tortricidae. It is found in Japan, Taiwan, China and Vietnam.

The wingspan is 19–28 mm for males and 26–37 mm for females.

The larvae feed on Arachis, Camellia sinensis, Chrysanthemum indicum, Citrus, Diospyros kaki, Eurya, Glycine, Lithocarpus edulis, Malus domestica, Nandina domestica, Paeonia, Paulownia tomentosa, Podocarpus, Prunus (including Prunus avium), Pyrus, Rhododendron, Rosa and Solanum melongena.
