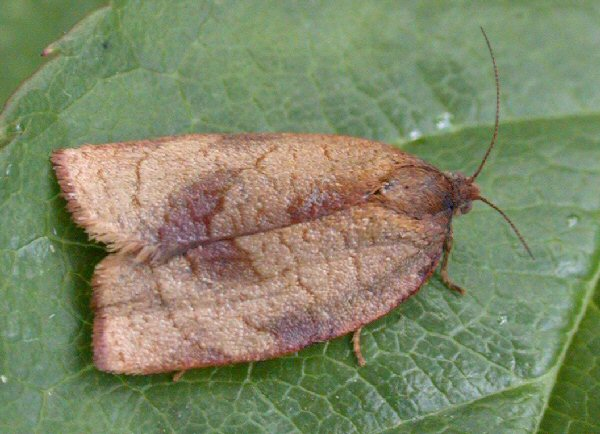
- Lozotaenia forsterana

Scientific classification
- Kingdom: Animalia
- Phylum: Arthropoda
- Class: Insecta
- Order: Lepidoptera
- Family: Tortricidae
- Tribe: Archipini
- Genus: Lozotaenia; Stephens, 1829

Synonyms
- Izotaenia Yasuda, 1975; Loxotaenia Harris, 1841

= Lozotaenia =

Genus of tortrix moths

Lozotaenia is a genus of moths in the tribe Archipini.

== Species ==
- Lozotaenia basilea Karisch, 2008
- Lozotaenia capensana (Walker, 1863)
- Lozotaenia capitana (Felder & Rogenhofer, 1875)
- Lozotaenia cedrivora Chambon, in ChambonFabre & Khemeci, 1990
- Lozotaenia coniferana (Issiki, in Issiki & Mutuura, 1961)
- Lozotaenia costinotana Franclemont, 1986
- Lozotaenia cupidinana (Staudinger, 1859)
- Lozotaenia cyanombra (Meyrick, 1935)
- Lozotaenia djakonovi Danilevsky, 1963
- Lozotaenia edwardi Razowski, 1999
- Lozotaenia edwardsi (Bradley, 1965)
- Lozotaenia exomilana Franclemont, 1986
- Lozotaenia forsterana (Fabricius, 1781)
- Lozotaenia hesperia Powell, 1962
- Lozotaenia karchana Razowski & Trematerra, 2010
- Lozotaenia kumatai Oku, 1963
- Lozotaenia manticopa (Meyrick, 1934)
- Lozotaenia melanophragma (Meyrick, 1936)
- Lozotaenia myriosema (Meyrick, 1936)
- Lozotaenia perapposita Razowski, 1984
- Lozotaenia retiana (Turati, 1913)
- Lozotaenia rindgei Obraztsov, 1962
- Lozotaenia sciarrettae Razowski & Trematerra, 2010
- Lozotaenia straminea (Schawerda, 1936)

== See also ==
- List of Tortricidae genera
