= Homona blaiki =

Scientific classification
- Kingdom: Animalia
- Phylum: Arthropoda
- Class: Insecta
- Order: Lepidoptera
- Family: Tortricidae
- Genus: Homona
- Species: H. blaiki

Binomial name
- Homona blaiki Razowski, 2013

Species of moth

Homona blaiki is a species of moth of the family Tortricidae first described by Józef Razowski in 2013. It is found on Seram and in New Caledonia. The habitat consists of alluvial forests, Eucalyptus forests, bamboo and secondary forests.

The wingspan is about 21 mm for males and 30 mm for females.
