= Lozotaenia basilea =

Scientific classification
- Domain: Eukaryota
- Kingdom: Animalia
- Phylum: Arthropoda
- Class: Insecta
- Order: Lepidoptera
- Family: Tortricidae
- Genus: Lozotaenia
- Species: L. basilea

Binomial name
- Lozotaenia basilea Karisch, 2008

Species of moth

Lozotaenia basilea is a species of moth of the family Tortricidae. It is found on Bioko, an offshore island of Equatorial Guinea.
