= Lozotaenia djakonovi =

Scientific classification
- Domain: Eukaryota
- Kingdom: Animalia
- Phylum: Arthropoda
- Class: Insecta
- Order: Lepidoptera
- Family: Tortricidae
- Genus: Lozotaenia
- Species: L. djakonovi

Binomial name
- Lozotaenia djakonovi Danilevsky, 1963

Species of moth

Lozotaenia djakonovi is a species of moth of the family Tortricidae. It is found in Turkey and Russia, where it has been recorded from alpine and subalpine belts in the northern Caucasus.

The wingspan is 24–28 mm.

Like other moths in the Tortricidae family, L. djakonovi exhibits bilateral symmetry.
