= Homona fistulata =

Scientific classification
- Kingdom: Animalia
- Phylum: Arthropoda
- Class: Insecta
- Order: Lepidoptera
- Family: Tortricidae
- Genus: Homona
- Species: H. fistulata

Binomial name
- Homona fistulata Meyrick, 1910

Species of moth

Homona fistulata is a species of moth of the family Tortricidae. It is found in Australia, where it has been recorded from Queensland.

The moth is about 14 mm for males and 16.5 mm for females.
