= Homona biscutata =

Scientific classification
- Domain: Eukaryota
- Kingdom: Animalia
- Phylum: Arthropoda
- Class: Insecta
- Order: Lepidoptera
- Family: Tortricidae
- Genus: Homona
- Species: H. biscutata

Binomial name
- Homona biscutata Meyrick, 1931

Species of moth

Homona biscutata is a species of moth of the family Tortricidae. It is found in the Democratic Republic of Congo (Équateur) and Guinea.
