= Homona encausta =

Scientific classification
- Kingdom: Animalia
- Phylum: Arthropoda
- Class: Insecta
- Order: Lepidoptera
- Family: Tortricidae
- Genus: Homona
- Species: H. encausta

Binomial name
- Homona encausta (Meyrick, 1907)

Synonyms
- Tortrix encausta Meyrick, 1907; Archips dicaeus Diakonoff, 1968

Species of moth

Homona encausta is a species of moth of the family Tortricidae first described by Edward Meyrick in 1907. It is found in Sri Lanka, Luzon in the Philippines and Vietnam.

The larvae feed on Syzygium jambos and Micromelum minutum.
