= Homona secura =

Scientific classification
- Kingdom: Animalia
- Phylum: Arthropoda
- Class: Insecta
- Order: Lepidoptera
- Family: Tortricidae
- Genus: Homona
- Species: H. secura

Binomial name
- Homona secura (Meyrick, 1910)

Synonyms
- Cacoecia secura Meyrick, 1910

Species of moth

Homona secura is a species of moth of the family Tortricidae. It is found on Flores in Indonesia.
