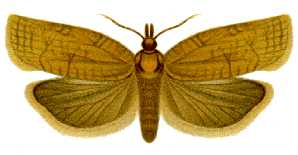

Scientific classification
- Kingdom: Animalia
- Phylum: Arthropoda
- Class: Insecta
- Order: Lepidoptera
- Family: Tortricidae
- Genus: Homona
- Species: H. spargotis

Binomial name
- Homona spargotis Meyrick, 1910

= Homona spargotis =

Species of moth

Homona spargotis, the avocado leafroller, is a moth of the family Tortricidae. It is found in the Australasian realm.

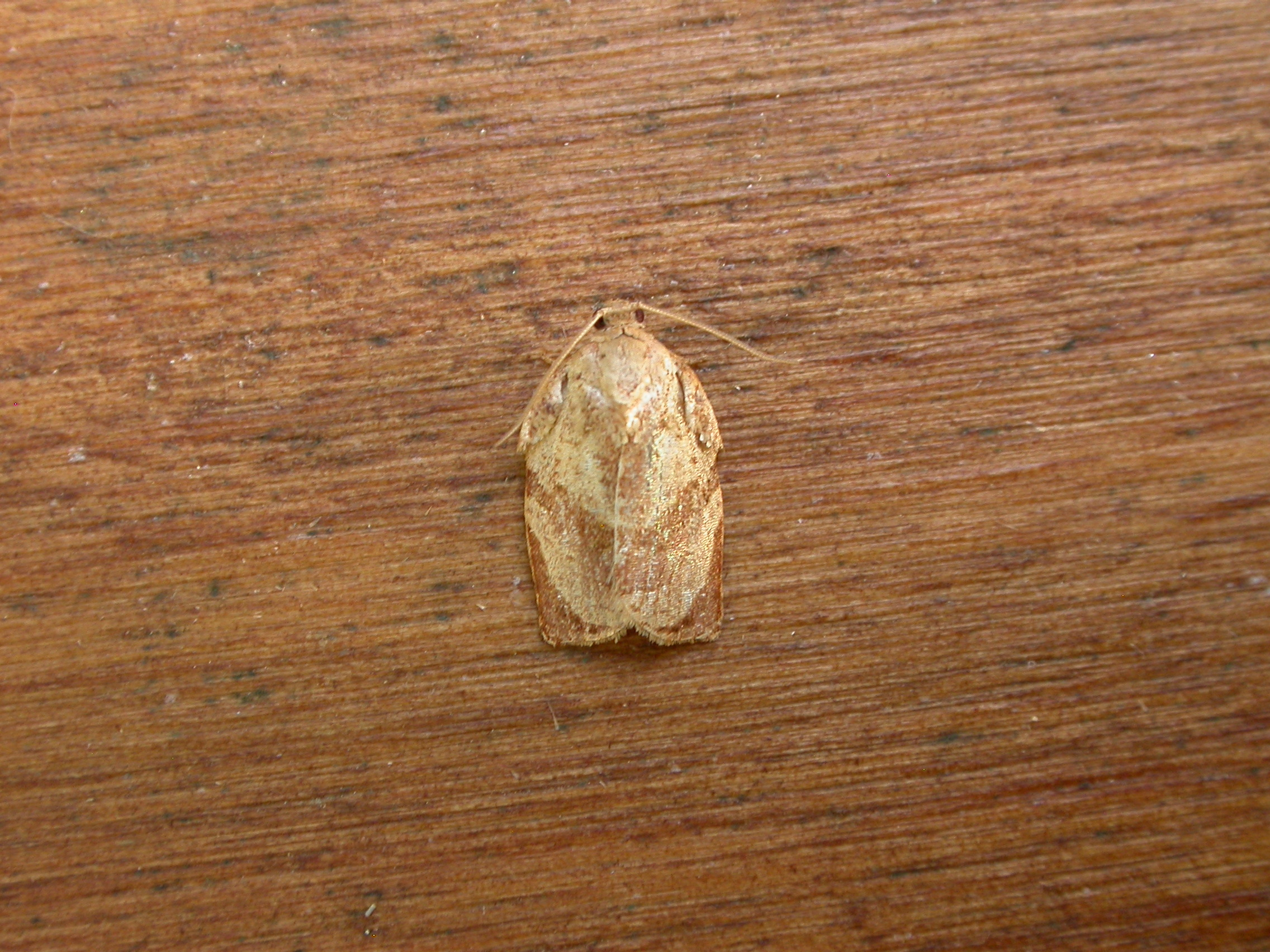

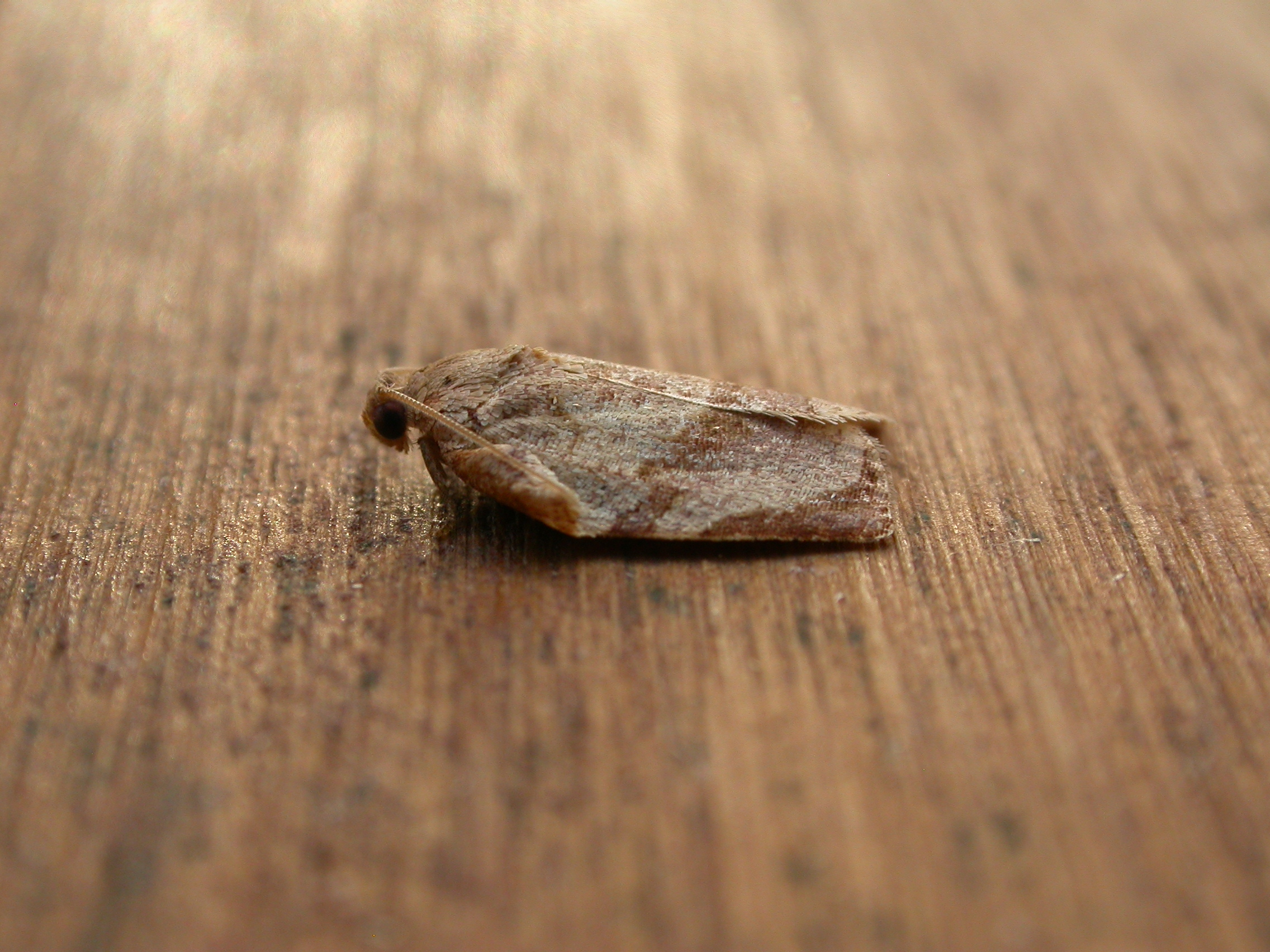

The wingspan is about 3 cm for males and 2 cm for females.

The larvae feed on avocado, Coffea, Camellia sinensis, custard-apple and bilimbi. The species is considered a pest.
