= Leontochroma aurantiacum =

Scientific classification
- Domain: Eukaryota
- Kingdom: Animalia
- Phylum: Arthropoda
- Class: Insecta
- Order: Lepidoptera
- Family: Tortricidae
- Genus: Leontochroma
- Species: L. aurantiacum

Binomial name
- Leontochroma aurantiacum Walsingham, 1900

Species of moth

Leontochroma aurantiacum is a moth of the family Tortricidae. It is found in Vietnam and India.
