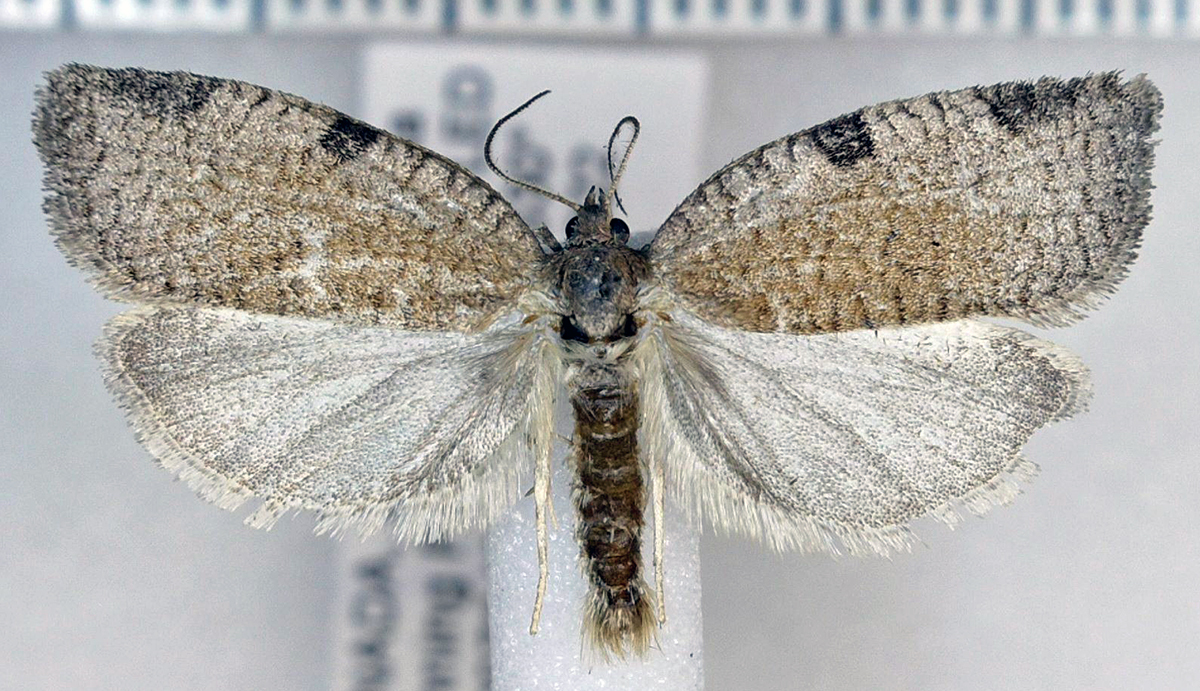

Scientific classification
- Domain: Eukaryota
- Kingdom: Animalia
- Phylum: Arthropoda
- Class: Insecta
- Order: Lepidoptera
- Family: Tortricidae
- Genus: Lozotaenia
- Species: L. rindgei

Binomial name
- Lozotaenia rindgei Obraztsov, 1962

= Lozotaenia rindgei =

Species of moth

Lozotaenia rindgei is a species of moth in the family Tortricidae. It was first described by Obraztsov in 1962 and is found in North America, where it has been recorded from Yukon, British Columbia, Oregon, Wyoming, Washington and North Carolina.

The wingspan is about 21–22 mm. Adults have been recorded on wing from late June to August.
