= Homona parvanima =

Scientific classification
- Kingdom: Animalia
- Phylum: Arthropoda
- Class: Insecta
- Order: Lepidoptera
- Family: Tortricidae
- Genus: Homona
- Species: H. parvanima

Binomial name
- Homona parvanima Razowski, 2008

Species of moth

Homona parvanima is a species of moth of the family Tortricidae. It is found in Vietnam.

The wingspan is about 16 mm for males and 25–26 mm for females.
