= Homona polyarcha =

Scientific classification
- Kingdom: Animalia
- Phylum: Arthropoda
- Class: Insecta
- Order: Lepidoptera
- Family: Tortricidae
- Genus: Homona
- Species: H. polyarcha

Binomial name
- Homona polyarcha Meyrick, 1924

Species of moth

Homona polyarcha is a species of moth of the family Tortricidae. It is found in Zimbabwe.
