= Lozotaenia karchana =

Scientific classification
- Kingdom: Animalia
- Phylum: Arthropoda
- Class: Insecta
- Order: Lepidoptera
- Family: Tortricidae
- Genus: Lozotaenia
- Species: L. karchana

Binomial name
- Lozotaenia karchana Razowski & Trematerra, 2010

Species of moth

Lozotaenia karchana is a species of moth of the family Tortricidae. The species is endemic to Ethiopia, where it is known only from the Harenna Forest in the Bale Mountains. The wingspan is about 22 mm for males and 32 mm for females. In the male, the head and labial palpus are yellowish brown. The forewings are brownish yellow, densely covered with fine brown streaks and scattered rust-colored scales. The hindwings are pale brown with a mix of cream near the tip. In females, the forewings are brownish yellow, decorated with fine brown streaks and dots.

== Taxonomy ==
Lozotaenia karchana was described by the entomologists J. Razowski and P. Trematerra in 2010 on the basis of an adult male specimen collected from the Bale Mountains in Ethiopia. The specific epithet refers to the Karcha Camp, where the species was first collected.

The species resembles Epichorista capitana in external morphology.

== Description ==
The wingspan is about 22 mm in males and 32 mm in females. In the male, the head and labial palpus are yellowish brown. The forewings are broad, with a curved leading edge (costa) and a slightly slanted, gently curved outer edge (termen). The forewings are brownish yellow, densely covered with fine brown streaks and scattered rust-colored scales. Markings are minimal, limited to brown remnants near the tornus (inner corner) of the central band (median fascia) and faint traces along the costa. The cilia is lighter than the wing color. The hindwings are pale brown with a mix of cream near the tip, and the cilia are much lighter than the wing itself.

In females, the forewing's costa is more prominently curved. The forewings are brownish yellow, decorated with fine brown streaks and dots, along with a rust-colored net-like pattern (subapical reticulation) near the tip. The markings are yellow-brown with darker brown areas, including remnants of a basal blotch, lighter brown sections along the costa in the median fascia and subapical blotch, and a large marking near the tornus.

In the male genitalia, the uncus is broad, tapering toward the base and rounded at the tip. The valva is also broad and features a wide brachiola. The sacculus is broad, straight along the underside, and forms an angle near the lower tip. The transtilla is wide and includes spiny lobes on the upper side near the edges. The aedeagus is large and ends in a hook-shaped structure on the underside.

In the female genitalia, the sterigma is small and features rounded lobes near the base. The sclerite of the antrum is very large, with a broad middle section and a small, lightly hardened (weakly sclerotized) colliculum. The ductus bursae is moderately long and lacks a cestum. The signum is shaped like a small funnel and does not have a basal plate.

== Distribution ==
The species is endemic to Ethiopia, where it is known only from the Harenna Forest in the Bale Mountains.
