= Lozotaenia sciarrettae =

Scientific classification
- Kingdom: Animalia
- Phylum: Arthropoda
- Class: Insecta
- Order: Lepidoptera
- Family: Tortricidae
- Genus: Lozotaenia
- Species: L. sciarrettae

Binomial name
- Lozotaenia sciarrettae Razowski & Trematerra, 2010

Species of moth

Lozotaenia sciarrettae is a species of moth of the family Tortricidae. The species is endemic to Ethiopia, where it is known only from the Harenna Forest in the Bale Mountains. The wingspan is 15–18 mm. In the male, the head and thorax are yellowish brown. The forewing is pale brownish cream with a hint of yellow. Yellow-brown shading is present, and some veins are tinted brown. In females, the forewing expands slightly toward the back, with a more slanted termen) compared to the male.

== Taxonomy ==
Lozotaenia sciarrettae was described by the entomologists J. Razowski and P. Trematerra in 2010 on the basis of an adult male specimen collected from the Bale Mountains in Ethiopia. The species is named after Andrea Sciarretta, who collected the holotype of this species and several other Ethiopian moths.

The species resembles Metamesia physetopa and Procrica dinshona in external morphology, but is most similar to L. karchana in the appearance of its genitalia.

== Description ==
The wingspan is 15–18 mm. In the male, the head and thorax are yellowish brown. The forewing slightly widens toward the tip, with the leading edge (costa) curved mainly near the base. The outer edge (termen) is gently wavy and slanted. The forewing is pale brownish cream with a hint of yellow. Yellow-brown shading is present, and some veins are tinted brown. The wing markings are yellowish brown and include a faint blotch near the base, a central band (median fascia) with a fairly straight front edge, and a small spot near the tip. A weak terminal marking appears as a central shaded area. The cilia closely matches the wing color. In females, the forewing expands slightly toward the back, with a more slanted termen) compared to the male.

In the male genitalia, the uncus is narrow up to the middle, then slightly widens and tapers to a point. The socius is broad. The gnathos is delicate, featuring a long central plate. The valva is oval-shaped and widest just beyond the base. The sacculus is slender, slightly curved in its first third, and ends in a tiny projection. The transtilla is broad, expands slightly at the sides, and has distinct spines on its upper surface. The aedeagus is of moderate size and includes a large dorsal process that splits into two at the tip (bifid). The coecum penis is long.

The apophyses are moderately short. The sterigma is broad, with clearly defined corners near the base and a roughened (scobinate) area just past the middle. The ostium is shielded by a hardened (sclerotized) plate. The ductus bursae is broad, and the signum is a finely spined plate.

== Distribution ==
The species is endemic to Ethiopia, where it is known only from the Harenna Forest in the Bale Mountains.
