= Homona difficilis =

Scientific classification
- Kingdom: Animalia
- Phylum: Arthropoda
- Class: Insecta
- Order: Lepidoptera
- Family: Tortricidae
- Genus: Homona
- Species: H. difficilis

Binomial name
- Homona difficilis (Meyrick, 1928)

Synonyms
- Cacoecia difficilis Meyrick, 1928

Species of moth

Homona difficilis is a species of moth of the family Tortricidae. It is found in Vietnam and on Borneo.
