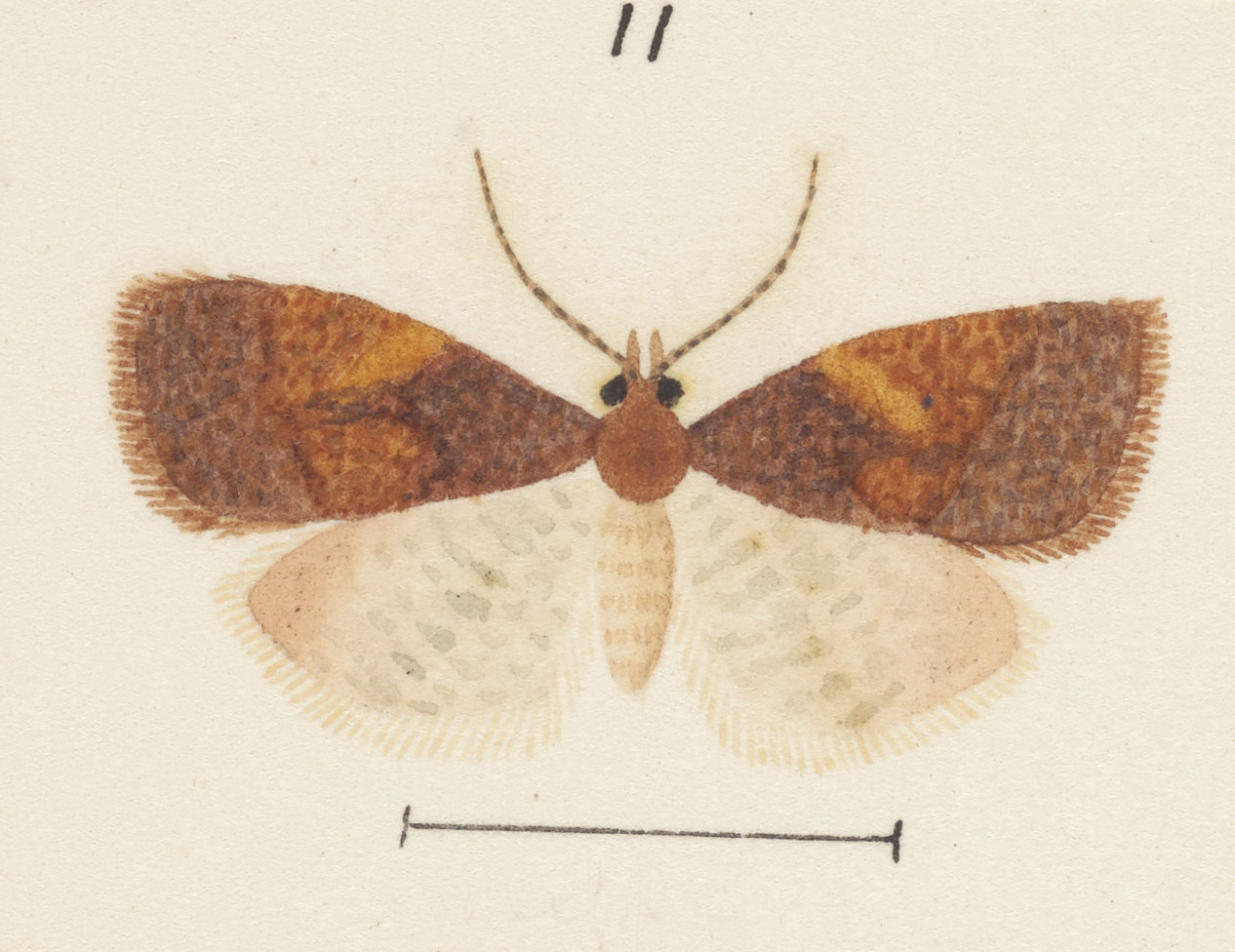

Scientific classification
- Domain: Eukaryota
- Kingdom: Animalia
- Phylum: Arthropoda
- Class: Insecta
- Order: Lepidoptera
- Family: Tortricidae
- Genus: Catamacta
- Species: C. alopecana

Binomial name
- Catamacta alopecana (Meyrick, 1885)

Synonyms
- Cacoecia alopecana Meyrick, 1885

= Catamacta alopecana =

Species of moth

Catamacta alopecana is a species of moth of the family Tortricidae. It is found in New Zealand.

The larvae feed on Phyllocladus aspleniifolius var. alpinus.
