= Homona nakaoi =

Scientific classification
- Kingdom: Animalia
- Phylum: Arthropoda
- Clade: Pancrustacea
- Class: Insecta
- Order: Lepidoptera
- Family: Tortricidae
- Genus: Homona
- Species: H. nakaoi

Binomial name
- Homona nakaoi Yasuda, 1962

Species of moth

Homona nakaoi is a species of moth of the family Tortricidae. It is found in Nepal, China and Vietnam.
