= Lozotaenia capitana =

Scientific classification
- Domain: Eukaryota
- Kingdom: Animalia
- Phylum: Arthropoda
- Class: Insecta
- Order: Lepidoptera
- Family: Tortricidae
- Genus: Lozotaenia
- Species: L. capitana

Binomial name
- Lozotaenia capitana (Felder & Rogenhofer, 1875)

Synonyms
- Tortrix capitana Felder & Rogenhofer, 1875

Species of moth

Lozotaenia capitana is a species of moth of the family Tortricidae. It is found in South Africa.
