= Lozotaenia cupidinana =

Scientific classification
- Domain: Eukaryota
- Kingdom: Animalia
- Phylum: Arthropoda
- Class: Insecta
- Order: Lepidoptera
- Family: Tortricidae
- Genus: Lozotaenia
- Species: L. cupidinana

Binomial name
- Lozotaenia cupidinana (Staudinger, 1859)

Synonyms
- Tortrix cupidinana Staudinger, 1859; Tortrix cupidiana Lederer, 1859; Tortrix croceana f. rasana Zerny, 1935

Species of moth

Lozotaenia cupidinana is a species of moth of the family Tortricidae. It is found in France, Portugal, Spain and Italy.

The wingspan is 20–23 mm for males and 24–28 mm for females. Adults have been recorded on wing from March to May.

The larvae feed on Daphne cnidium, Helianthemum, Pistacia lentiscus and Dorycnium germanicum.
