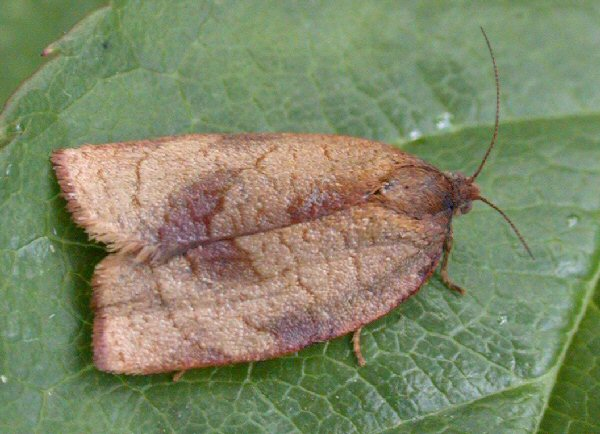

Scientific classification
- Domain: Eukaryota
- Kingdom: Animalia
- Phylum: Arthropoda
- Class: Insecta
- Order: Lepidoptera
- Family: Tortricidae
- Genus: Lozotaenia
- Species: L. forsterana

Binomial name
- Lozotaenia forsterana (Fabricius, 1781)

Synonyms
- Pyralis forsterana Fabricius, 1781; Tortrix adiunctana Treitschke, 1830; Tortrix adjunctana Treitschke, 1835; Tortrix argillaceana Zetterstedt, 1839; Tortrix forsterana f. fagi Constantini, 1923; Lozotaenia foresterana Sharma, in Medvedev, 1987; Tortrix immaculatana Strand, 1900; Tortrix laviceana Duponchel, in Godart, 1834; Xanthosetia luteolana Humphreys & Westwood, 1845; Tortrix forsterana var. norlandiae Strand, 1920; Tortrix retucilana Frolich, 1828; Tortrix sineana Freyer, 1833

= Lozotaenia forsterana =

Species of moth

Lozotaenia forsterana is a moth of the family Tortricidae. It is found in Europe and across the Palearctic.

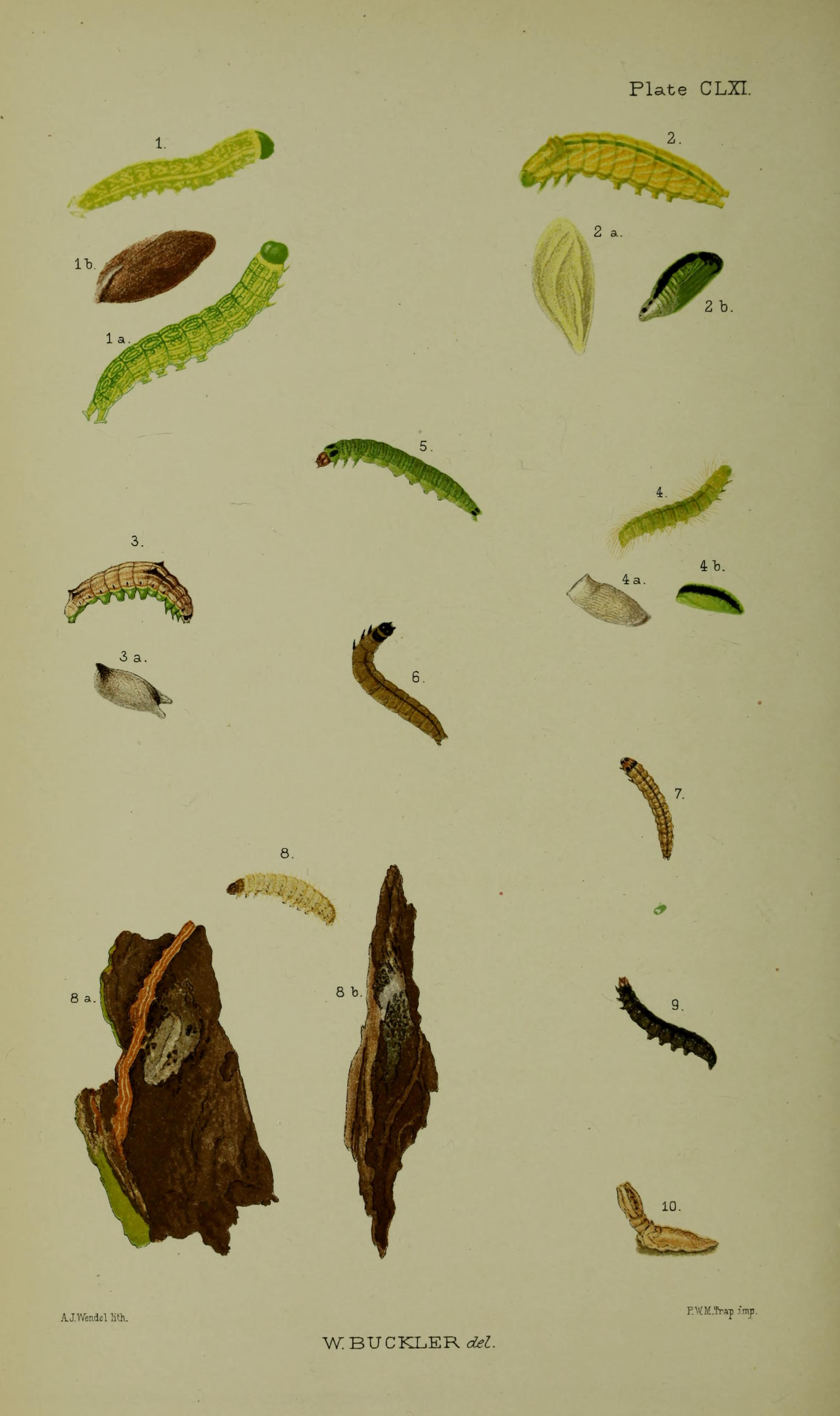
Figs. 5 larva after final moult

The wingspan is 20–29 mm. The forewings are narrowed anteriorly and pale brownish, darker-strigulated. The central fascia is represented by a dark fuscous costal spot, and there is an ill-defined praetornal suffusion. The costal patch is dark fuscous. The hindwings are grey. The larva is pale grey -green or grey, sides sometimes whitish; head black; plate of 2 yellow-brown, with two black spots.

The moth flies from June to August.

The larvae feed on various plants, but prefer Hedera helix.
