= Homona aestivana =

Scientific classification
- Kingdom: Animalia
- Phylum: Arthropoda
- Class: Insecta
- Order: Lepidoptera
- Family: Tortricidae
- Genus: Homona
- Species: H. aestivana

Binomial name
- Homona aestivana (Walker, 1866)

Synonyms
- Ericia aestivana Walker, 1866; Homona ecprepes Turner, 1945; Ericia posticana Walker, 1866; Homona tribapta Meyrick, 1928

Species of moth

Homona aestivana is a species of moth of the family Tortricidae first described by Francis Walker in 1866. It is found in the Philippines, Australia (Queensland), New Guinea (including the Bismarck Archipelago) and Indonesia (including Seram and the Sula Islands).

The larvae feed on Theobroma cacao.
