= Lozotaenia coniferana =

Scientific classification
- Kingdom: Animalia
- Phylum: Arthropoda
- Class: Insecta
- Order: Lepidoptera
- Family: Tortricidae
- Genus: Lozotaenia
- Species: L. coniferana

Binomial name
- Lozotaenia coniferana (Issiki, in Issiki & Mutuura, 1961)

Synonyms
- Choristoneura coniferana Issiki, in Issiki & Mutuura, 1961

Species of moth

Lozotaenia coniferana is a species of moth of the family Tortricidae. It is found in Japan on the islands of Hokkaido and Honshu and in Korea.

The wingspan is 20–25 mm (0.79–0.98 in). Adults are on wing in July in one generation per year.

The larvae feed on Abies sachalinensis, Abies homolepis, Abies concolor, Picea excelsa, Picea pungens and Picea alba.
