= Leontochroma suppurpuratum =

Scientific classification
- Domain: Eukaryota
- Kingdom: Animalia
- Phylum: Arthropoda
- Class: Insecta
- Order: Lepidoptera
- Family: Tortricidae
- Genus: Leontochroma
- Species: L. suppurpuratum

Binomial name
- Leontochroma suppurpuratum Walsingham, 1900

Synonyms
- Gnorismoneura heliadopa Meyrick in Caradja & Meyrick, 1937; Leontochroma lebetanum Walsingham, 1900; Gnorismoneura violascens Meyrick, 1934

Species of moth

Leontochroma suppurpuratum is a moth of the family Tortricidae. It is found in Vietnam, China and India.
