= Lozotaenia hesperia =

Scientific classification
- Kingdom: Animalia
- Phylum: Arthropoda
- Clade: Pancrustacea
- Class: Insecta
- Order: Lepidoptera
- Family: Tortricidae
- Genus: Lozotaenia
- Species: L. hesperia

Binomial name
- Lozotaenia hesperia Powell, 1962

Species of moth

Lozotaenia hesperia is a species of moth of the family Tortricidae first described by Powell in 1962. It is found in North America, where it has been recorded from Alaska, Yukon, Alberta, Saskatchewan and Quebec.

The wingspan is about 24 mm. Adults have been recorded on wing from late June to July.
