= Lozotaenia capensana =

Scientific classification
- Kingdom: Animalia
- Phylum: Arthropoda
- Class: Insecta
- Order: Lepidoptera
- Family: Tortricidae
- Genus: Lozotaenia
- Species: L. capensana

Binomial name
- Lozotaenia capensana (Walker, 1863)

Synonyms
- Teras capensana Walker, 1863; Teras meridionana Walker, 1863; Tortrix meridionara Pinhey, 1975; Teras reciprocana Walker, 1863

Species of moth

Lozotaenia capensana, the Cape roller or apple leafroller, is a species of moth of the family Tortricidae. It is found in Gambia, Malawi, Mozambique, Zimbabwe, South Africa (KwaZulu-Natal, the Western Cape and Gauteng) and on Saint Helena in the South Atlantic.

The larvae feed on Chrysanthemoides monilifera, Passiflora mollisima, Lycium ferocissimum, Pinus radiata, Pinus patula, Pericallis × hybrida, Calendula, Malus, Pyrus, Tacsonia, Fragaria and Citrus species.
