= Lozotaenia retiana =

Scientific classification
- Domain: Eukaryota
- Kingdom: Animalia
- Phylum: Arthropoda
- Class: Insecta
- Order: Lepidoptera
- Family: Tortricidae
- Genus: Lozotaenia
- Species: L. retiana

Binomial name
- Lozotaenia retiana (Turati, 1913)

Synonyms
- Eulia retiana Turati, 1913; Eulia retiana f. acervosana Turati, 1913; Eulia turatiana Schawerda, 1934

Species of moth

Lozotaenia retiana is a species of moth of the family Tortricidae. It is found on Sardinia.

The wingspan is 22–24 mm. Adults are on wing in August and September.
