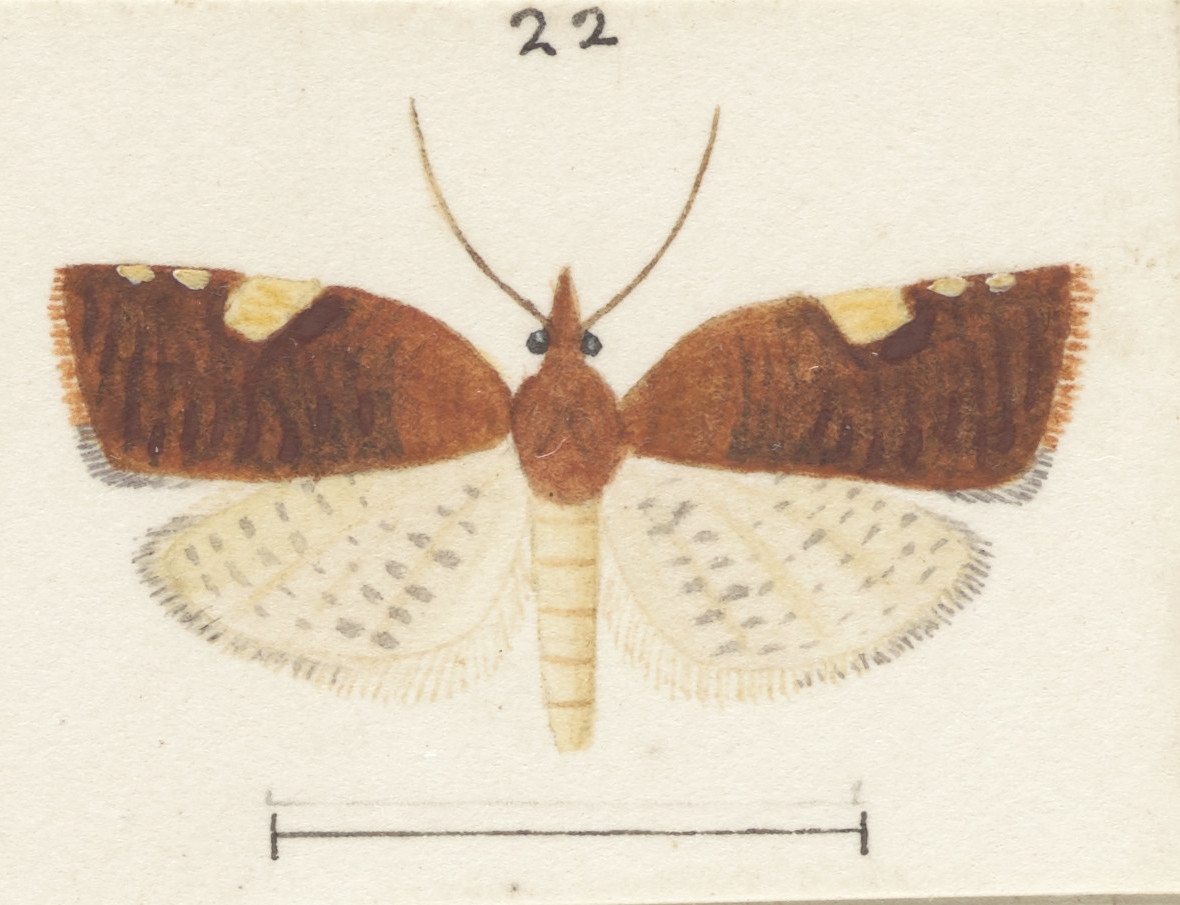

Scientific classification
- Domain: Eukaryota
- Kingdom: Animalia
- Phylum: Arthropoda
- Class: Insecta
- Order: Lepidoptera
- Family: Tortricidae
- Genus: Catamacta
- Species: C. rureana

Binomial name
- Catamacta rureana (Felder & Rogenhofer, 1875)

Synonyms
- Rhacodia rureana Felder & Rogenhofer, 1875; Adoxophyes camelina Meyrick, 1891

= Catamacta rureana =

Species of moth

Catamacta rureana is a species of moth of the family Tortricidae. It is found in New Zealand.
