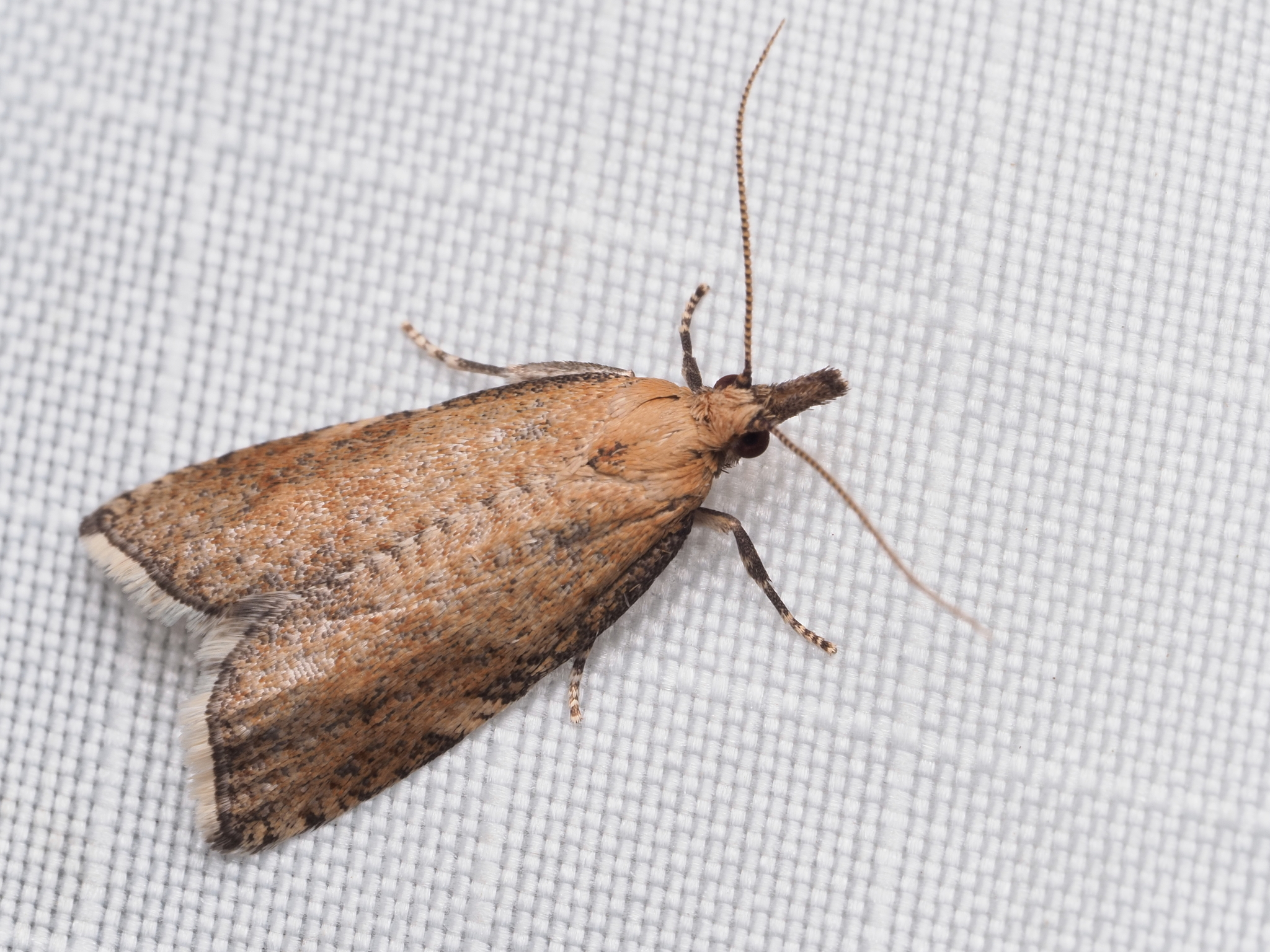
- Catamacta lotinana seen near Glorit, Auckland Region, New Zealand

Scientific classification
- Domain: Eukaryota
- Kingdom: Animalia
- Phylum: Arthropoda
- Class: Insecta
- Order: Lepidoptera
- Family: Tortricidae
- Genus: Catamacta
- Species: C. lotinana

Binomial name
- Catamacta lotinana (Meyrick, 1883)

Synonyms
- Adoxophyes lotinana Meyrick, 1883; Tortrix lotinana (Meyrick, 1883)

= Catamacta lotinana =

Species of moth

Catamacta lotinana is a species of moth of the family Tortricidae. It is found in New Zealand.

== Gallery ==
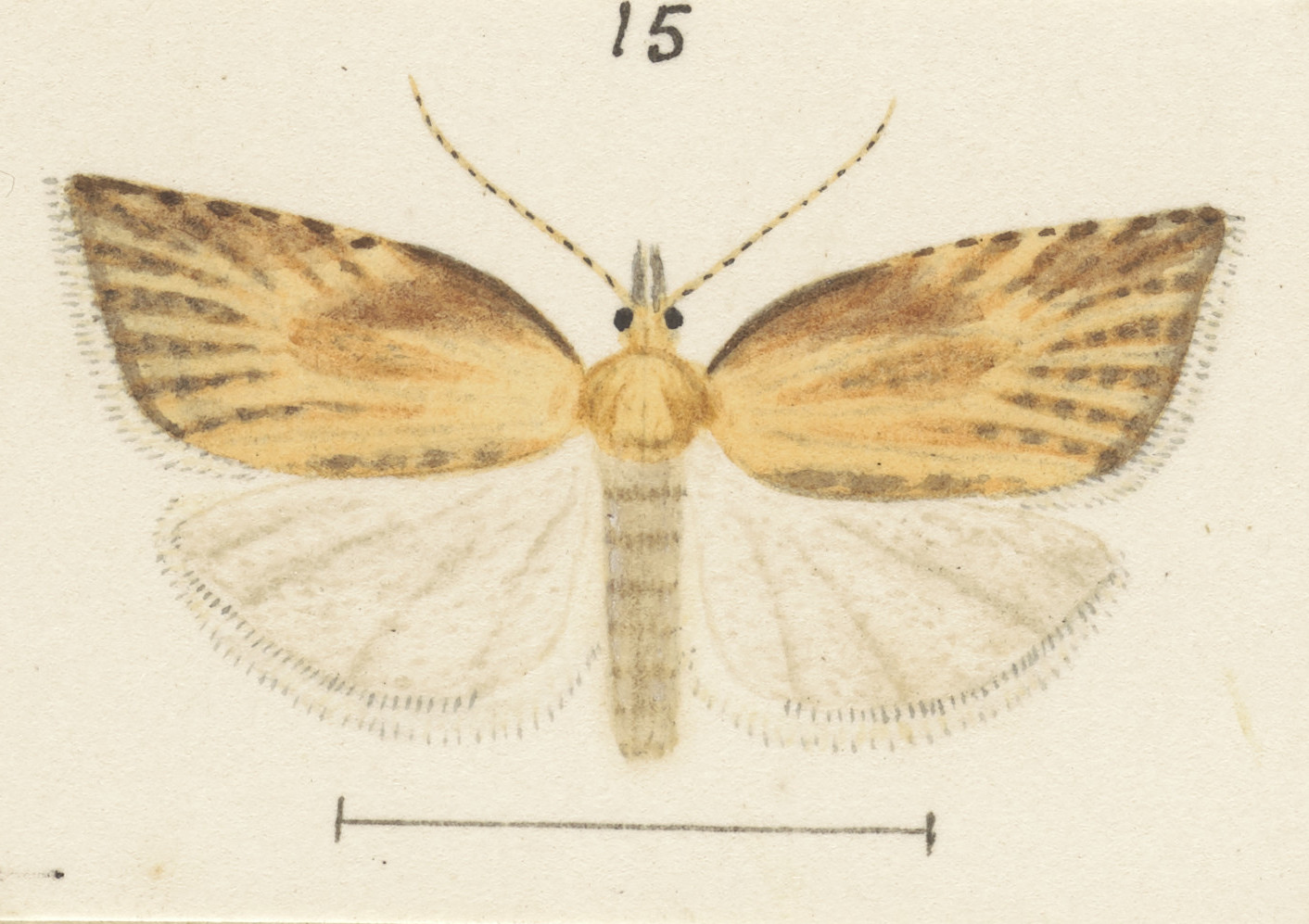
Watercolour by George Hudson, circa 1927

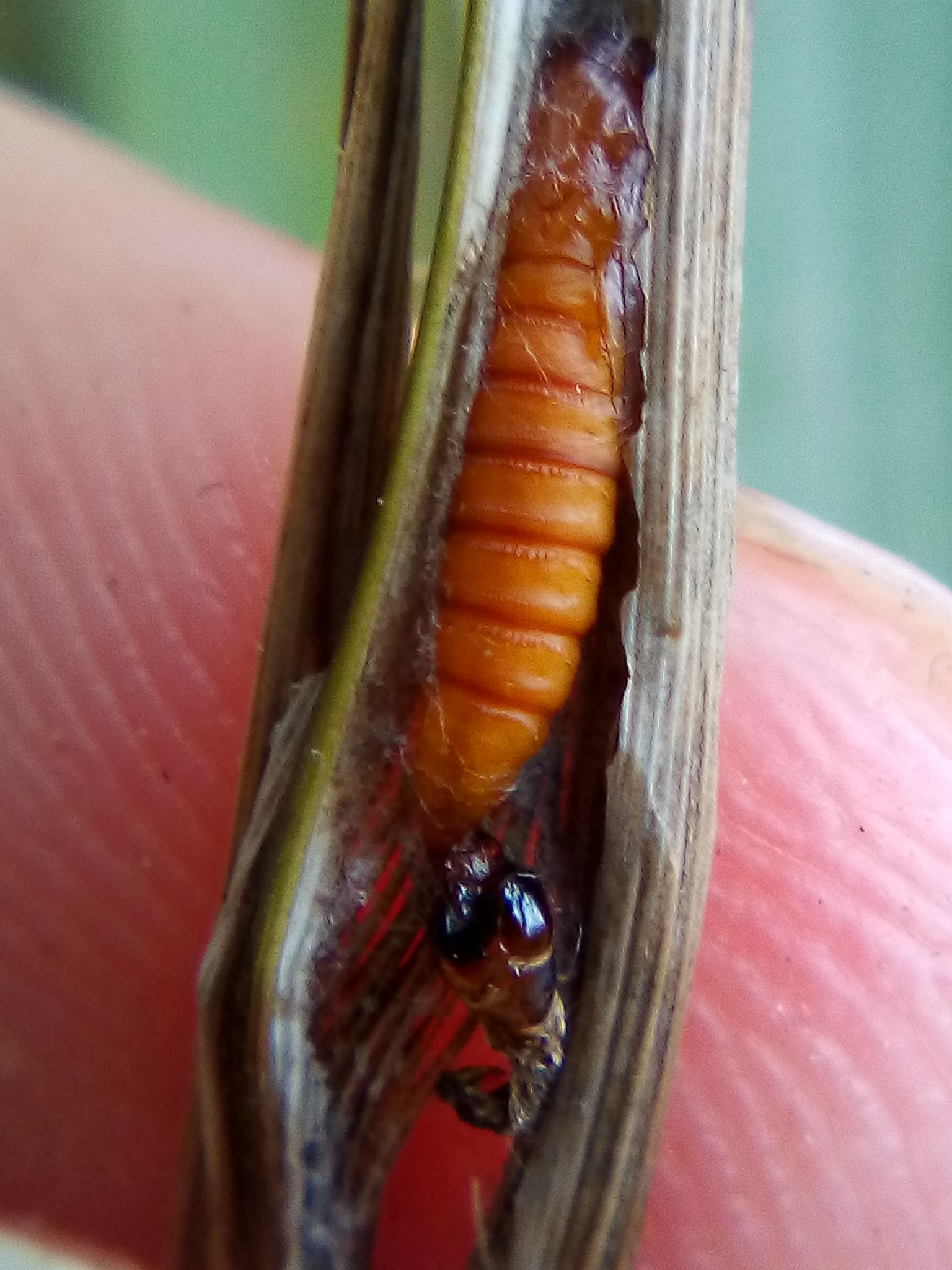
Pupa of Catamacta lotinana

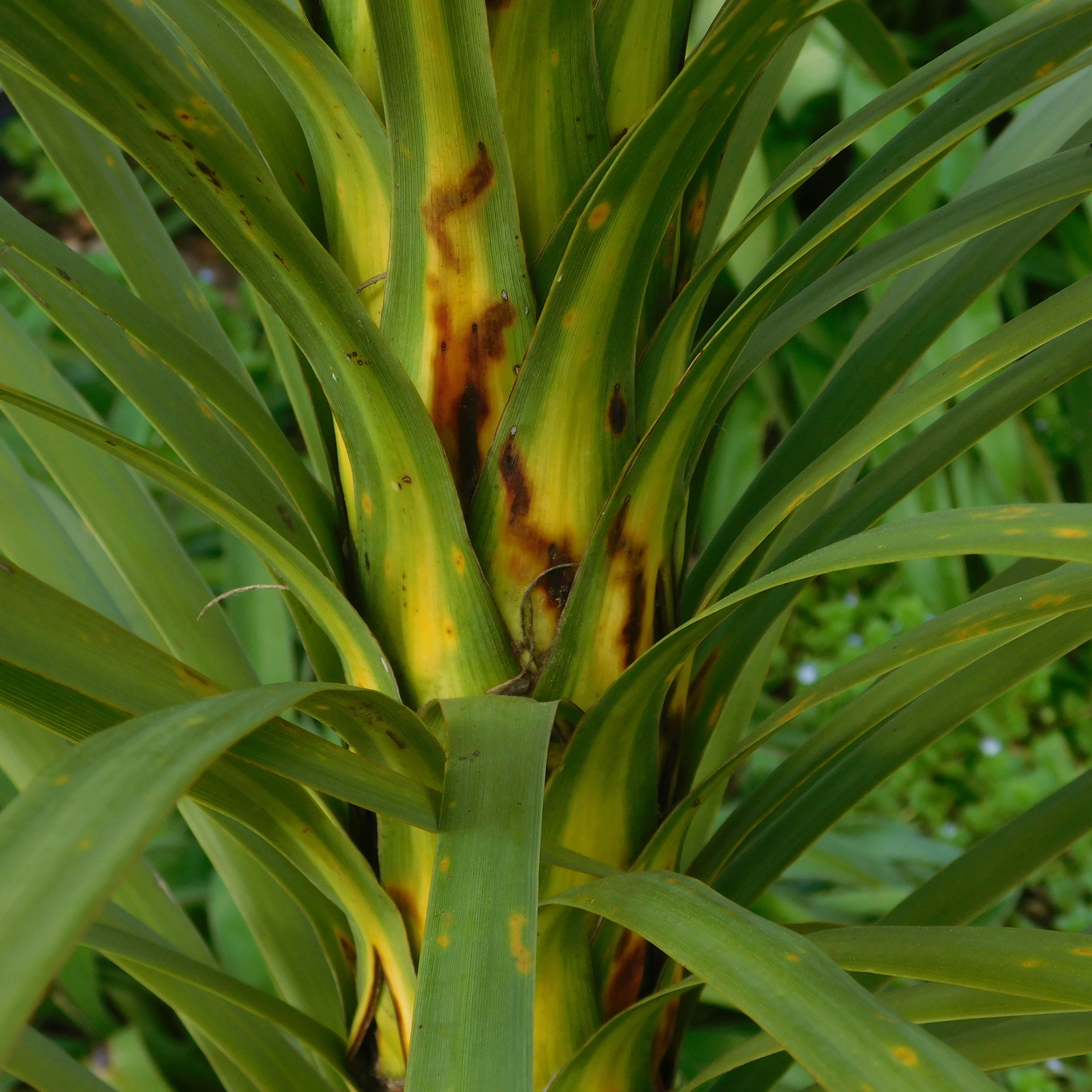
Brown stained mines on Cordyline australis showing evidence of Catamacta lotinana
