= Lozotaenia cyanombra =

Scientific classification
- Kingdom: Animalia
- Phylum: Arthropoda
- Class: Insecta
- Order: Lepidoptera
- Family: Tortricidae
- Genus: Lozotaenia
- Species: L. cyanombra

Binomial name
- Lozotaenia cyanombra (Meyrick, 1935)

Synonyms
- Homona cyanombra Meyrick, 1935

Species of moth

Lozotaenia cyanombra is a species of moth of the family Tortricidae. It is found in the Democratic Republic of Congo.
