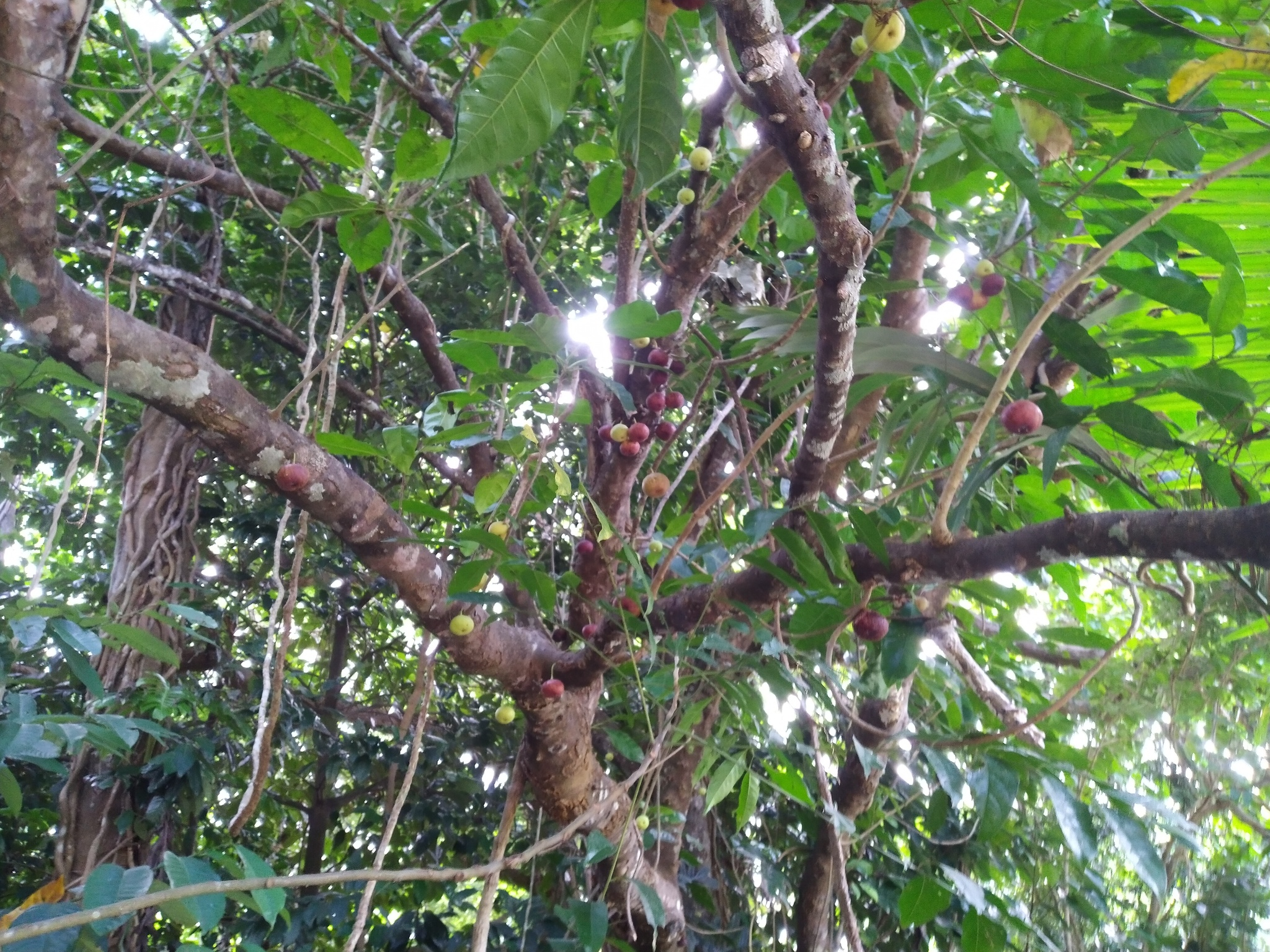
- Mature individual with fruit

Conservation status
- Least Concern (IUCN 3.1)

Scientific classification
- Kingdom: Plantae
- Clade: Tracheophytes
- Clade: Angiosperms
- Clade: Eudicots
- Clade: Rosids
- Order: Rosales
- Family: Moraceae
- Genus: Ficus
- Species: F. copiosa

Binomial name
- Ficus copiosa Steud.

Synonyms
- List: Ficus acanthophylla Summerh.; Ficus brevicuspis Miq.; Ficus copiosa var. muriculata (Miq.) King; Ficus copiosa var. pubescens Corner; Ficus duriuscula var. grandifolia Diels; Ficus krausseana Rech.; Ficus longipedunculata Rech., nom. illeg. homonym. post.; Ficus magnifolia F.Muell.; Ficus mourilyanensis F.M.Bailey; Ficus muriculata Miq.; Ficus polycarpa Roxb., nom. illeg. homonym. post.; Ficus senfftiana Warb.; Ficus subinflata Warb.

= Ficus copiosa =

Species of plant

Ficus copiosa, the plentiful fig, is a species of flowering plant in the family Moraceae. It is a tree native to the Andaman Islands and southern Myanmar, to Sulawesi, the Maluku Islands, Papuasia (New Guinea, the Bismarck Archipelago, and Solomon Islands), and Queensland, and to the Caroline Islands and Vanuatu in the western Pacific. The leaves are widely consumed as a vegetable by local peoples.
