= Lozotaenia myriosema =

Scientific classification
- Kingdom: Animalia
- Phylum: Arthropoda
- Class: Insecta
- Order: Lepidoptera
- Family: Tortricidae
- Genus: Lozotaenia
- Species: L. myriosema

Binomial name
- Lozotaenia myriosema (Meyrick, 1936)

Synonyms
- Homona myriosema Meyrick, 1936

Species of moth

Lozotaenia myriosema is a species of moth of the family Tortricidae. It is found in the Democratic Republic of Congo.
