= Quercus oidocarpa =

Conservation status
- Near Threatened (IUCN 3.1)

Scientific classification
- Kingdom: Plantae
- Clade: Tracheophytes
- Clade: Angiosperms
- Clade: Eudicots
- Clade: Rosids
- Order: Fagales
- Family: Fagaceae
- Genus: Quercus
- Subgenus: Quercus subg. Cerris
- Section: Quercus sect. Cyclobalanopsis
- Species: Q. oidocarpa

Binomial name
- Quercus oidocarpa Korth. (1844)

Synonyms
- Cyclobalanopsis oidocarpa (Korth.) Oerst. (1866); Quercus brevistyla (A.Camus (1933)

Species of oak

Quercus oidocarpa is a species of oak. It is a tree native to parts of Indochina and western Malesia, including Myanmar, Thailand, Vietnam, Peninsular Malaysia, Borneo, Sumatra, and Bangka. It grows in lowland and montane tropical moist forests from 150 to 1,700 metres elevation.

It has a heavy timber which is used locally for construction.
