= Homona antitona =

Scientific classification
- Kingdom: Animalia
- Phylum: Arthropoda
- Class: Insecta
- Order: Lepidoptera
- Family: Tortricidae
- Genus: Homona
- Species: H. antitona

Binomial name
- Homona antitona (Meyrick, 1927)

Synonyms
- Rhapsidoca antitona Meyrick, 1927; Leontochroma antitona

Species of moth

Homona antitona is a species of moth of the family Tortricidae first described by Edward Meyrick in 1927. It is found on Sumatra and Seram in Indonesia. The habitat consists of secondary upper montane forests.
