= Lozotaenia manticopa =

Scientific classification
- Kingdom: Animalia
- Phylum: Arthropoda
- Class: Insecta
- Order: Lepidoptera
- Family: Tortricidae
- Genus: Lozotaenia
- Species: L. manticopa

Binomial name
- Lozotaenia manticopa (Meyrick, 1934)

Synonyms
- Catamacta manticopa Meyrick, 1934

Species of moth

Lozotaenia manticopa is a species of moth of the family Tortricidae. It is found in the Democratic Republic of Congo.
