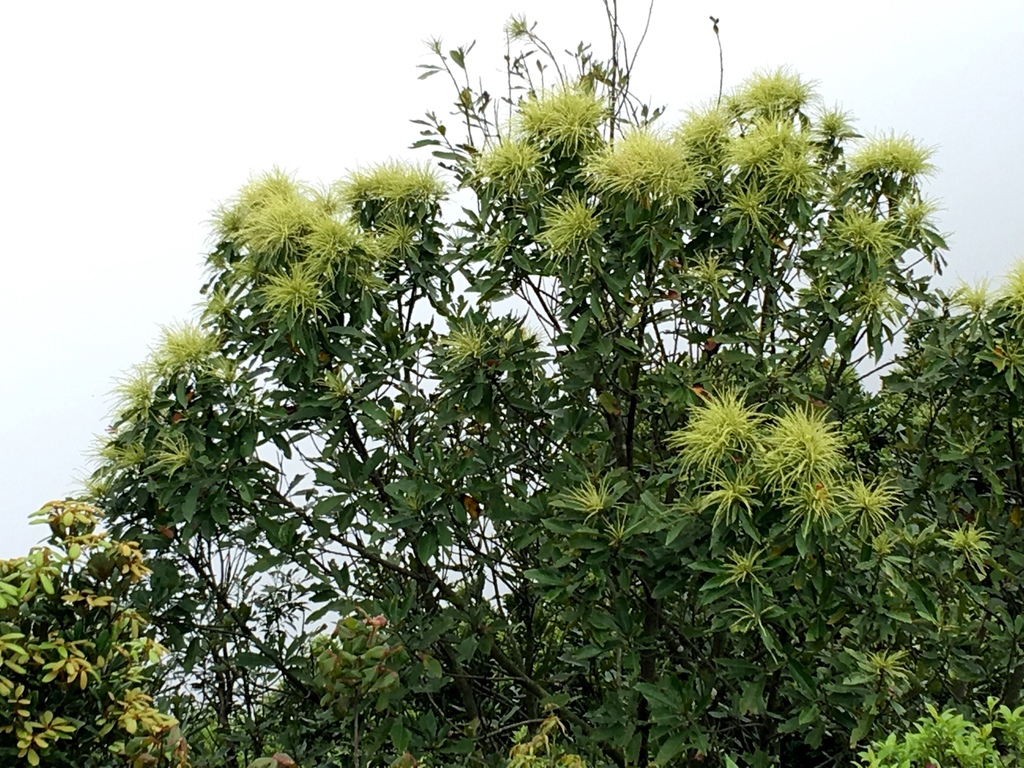
- Ma On Shan Country Park, Hong Kong

Conservation status
- Least Concern (IUCN 3.1)

Scientific classification
- Kingdom: Plantae
- Clade: Tracheophytes
- Clade: Angiosperms
- Clade: Eudicots
- Clade: Rosids
- Order: Fagales
- Family: Fagaceae
- Genus: Castanopsis
- Species: C. fissa

Binomial name
- Castanopsis fissa (Champ. ex Benth.) Rehder & E.H.Wilson

Synonyms
- Castanea regia Hance; Castanopsis fissoides Chun & C.C.Huang; Castanopsis tunkinensis (Drake) Barnett; Lithocarpus fissus (Champ. ex Benth.) A.Camus; Lithocarpus fissus var. bipoupensis A.Camus; Lithocarpus fissus subsp. eufirmus A.Camus; Lithocarpus fissus subsp. tunkinensis (Drake) A.Camus; Pasania fissa (Champ. ex Benth.) Oerst.; Pasania fissa var. tunkinensis (Drake) Hickel & A.Camus; Quercus fissa Champ. ex Benth. (1854) (basionym); Quercus tunkinensis Drake; Shiia fissa (Champ. ex Benth.) Kudô; Synaedrys fissa (Champ. ex Benth.) Koidz.; Synaedrys tunkinensis (Drake) Koidz.

= Castanopsis fissa =

Species of flowering plant

Castanopsis fissa is a species of tree native to Southeast China, Hong Kong, Laos, Thailand and Vietnam.

The specific Latin epithet fissa means fissure, referring to its fruits splitting into segments when they mature.

== Description ==
This species is a large evergreen tree that can reach up to 20 meters (66 ft) in height. Its bark is greyish-brown and becomes coarse with age, while the branchlets are red-purple with conspicuous ribs. The leaves are alternate, thick, and papery, highly variable in size and shape, ranging from oblong to obovate-elliptic, with a cuneate base and rounded, undulate, and crenate teeth on the lower half. Lateral veins are numerous, typically 15–20 pairs, raised on the underside; the upper surface is glabrous, while the lower surface is initially yellowish-brown puberulent but becomes glabrescent. Flowers are arranged in erect spikes forming panicles that resemble fireworks; they are unisexual, monoecious, and many-flowered, with white, clustered stamens. The fruit consists of an ovoid to ellipsoid cupule, slightly dark reddish-brown and tomentose, which fully encloses the nut when immature and splits into 2–3 irregular segments at maturity. Each cupule contains a single globose to elliptic nut that is reddish-brown in color.

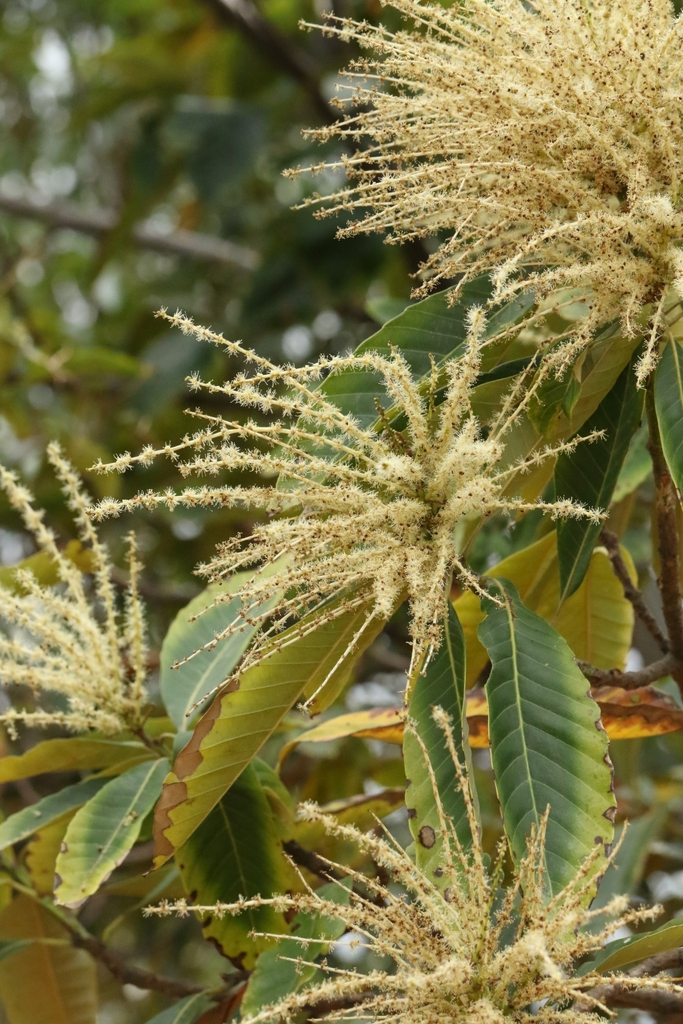

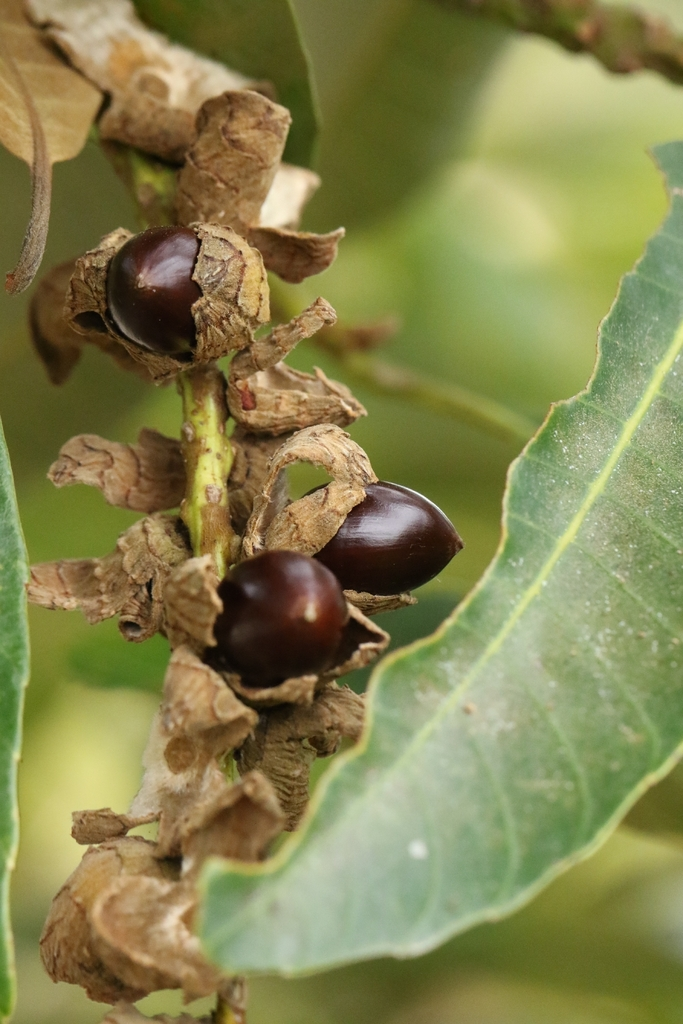

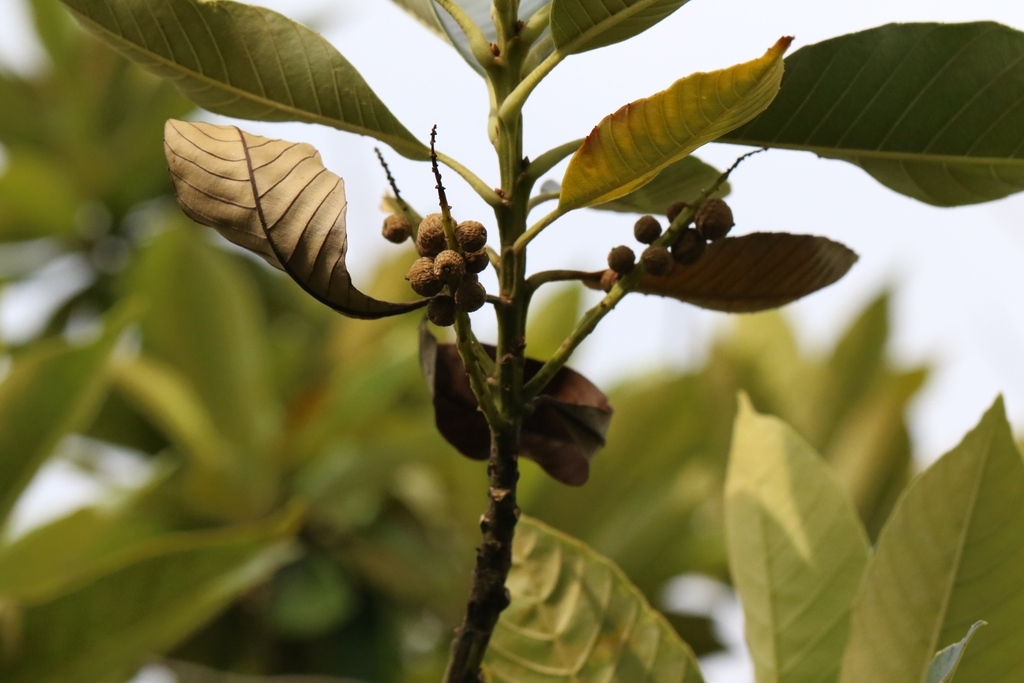

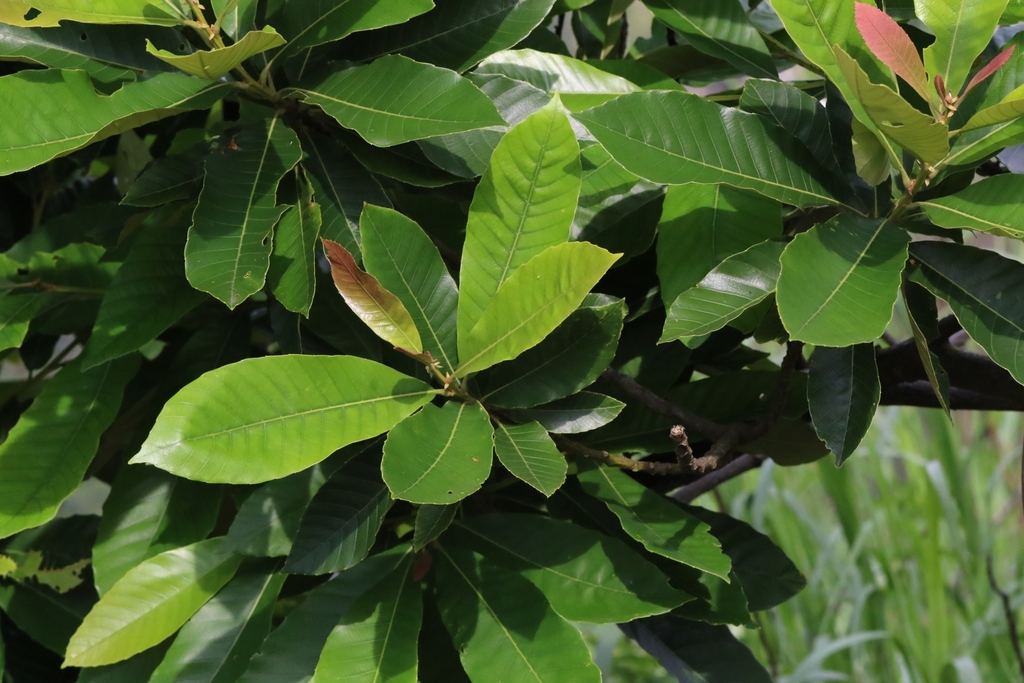

=== Life cycle ===
The species flowers from April to June, and fruits from October to November.

== Distribution and habitats ==
While the species occurs in Southeast China, Hong Kong, Laos, Thailand and Vietnam, it extend its range closer to the south China coast. And, it grows primarily in the wet tropical lowland.

== Ecology ==
The seed dispersal of C. fissa is strongly constrained by both biological and landscape factors. Its cupules are extremely hard and are primarily consumed by rodents and other scatter-hoarding animals, while otherwise relying largely on gravity for dispersal. As a result, seeds typically fall and establish close to the parent tree, usually within about five meters in forest environments. This limited dispersal capacity makes natural migration of Castanopsis species unlikely, especially in areas with low forest connectivity. Expansion into new habitats depends on continuous forest cover, particularly near the northern edge of their historical range. However, primary forests in these regions were cleared centuries ago, and existing forested landscapes now mainly consist of plantations or regenerating secondary forests with reduced species diversity, further limits their migration.

== Uses ==
The species is a fast-growing evergreen that is highly tolerant of poor soils. As one of the few native species to thrive during the early reforestation efforts in Hong Kong, it has proven highly resilient and adaptable. Thus, it is often selected as a pioneer species to prevent soil erosion.

The starchy fruits was cooked into congee, a food that Hong Kong villagers relied on during the Japanese occupation.

== Conservation ==
Castanopsis seeds cannot be effectively stored because they are recalcitrant and lose viability rapidly under typical seed storage conditions. To conserve large populations while preserving genetic diversity, the most effective approach would be human-assisted migration to suitable habitats.
