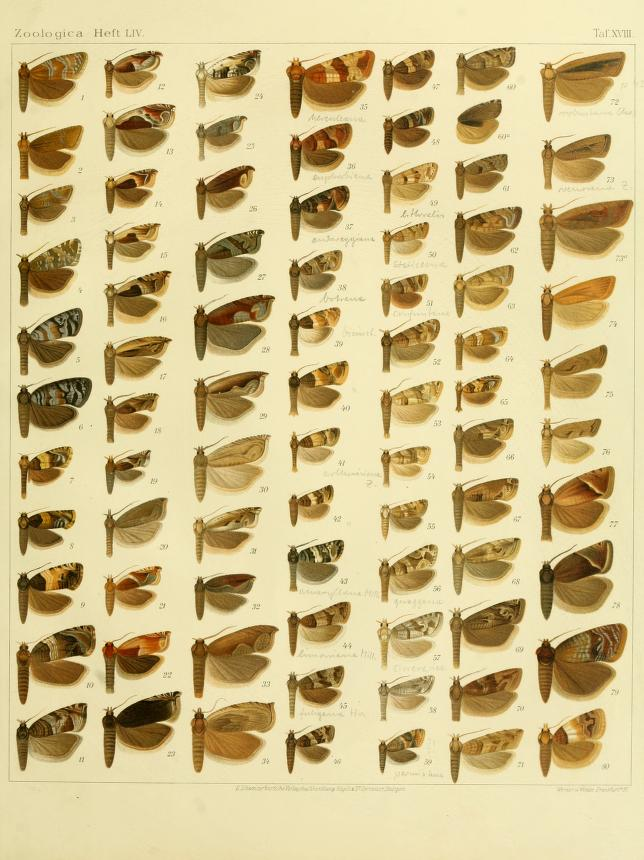
- Bactra venosana in Kennel Die palaearktischen tortriciden figure 73, male

Scientific classification
- Kingdom: Animalia
- Phylum: Arthropoda
- Clade: Pancrustacea
- Class: Insecta
- Order: Lepidoptera
- Family: Tortricidae
- Genus: Bactra
- Species: B. venosana

Binomial name
- Bactra venosana (Zeller, 1847)

Synonyms
- Phoxopteris venosana Zeller, 1847; Aphelia venosana Herrich-Schäffer, 1849; Bactra banosii Gozmny, 1960; Bactra geraropa Meyrick, 1931; Bactra scythropa Meyrick, 1911; Bactra truculenta Meyrick, 1909

= Bactra venosana =

Species of moth

Bactra venosana, the nutgrass borer or nutsedge borer, is a moth of the family Tortricidae. It was first described by Philipp Christoph Zeller in 1847. Julius von Kennel provides a full description. It has a wide distribution, from southern Europe, North Africa and Asia Minor to India, Sri Lanka, southern China, Malaya, Australia and into the Pacific where it is found on Java, Borneo, the Philippines, Taiwan, Timor, the Solomons, the Carolines and Fiji. It was introduced to Hawaii in 1925 to control nutsedge. It is now found on Kauai, Oahu, Molokai, Maui, Lanai and Hawaii.

== Biology ==
The larvae feed on Cyperus rotundus and Kyllinga species, including Kyllinga brevifolia and Kyllinga monocephala. They bore the stem of their host plant.

== Control ==
Mechanical methods such as hand picking of adults and caterpillars are effective. Pheromone traps and light traps are also effective. Eggs can be destroyed biologically by using the egg parasitoid Trichogrammatoidea bactrae.
