= Bactra copidotes =

Scientific classification
- Kingdom: Animalia
- Phylum: Arthropoda
- Class: Insecta
- Order: Lepidoptera
- Family: Tortricidae
- Genus: Bactra
- Species: B. copidotes

Binomial name
- Bactra copidotes (Meyrick, 1909)

Synonyms
- Bactra phenacistis Meyrick, 1909; Bactra commensalis Meyrick, 1922; Bactra borealis Diakonoff, 1964

Species of moth

Bactra copidotes is a moth of the family Tortricidae first described by Edward Meyrick in 1909. It is found in India and Sri Lanka.
