= Syntozyga endaphana =

Scientific classification
- Kingdom: Animalia
- Phylum: Arthropoda
- Clade: Pancrustacea
- Class: Insecta
- Order: Lepidoptera
- Family: Tortricidae
- Genus: Syntozyga
- Species: S. endaphana

Binomial name
- Syntozyga endaphana (Diakonoff, 1968)

Synonyms
- Bubonoxena endaphana Diakonoff, 1968

Species of moth

Syntozyga endaphana is a tortrix moth (family Tortricidae), belonging to tribe Eucosmini of subfamily Olethreutinae. It is found in the Philippines, and looks very similar to Bubonoxena ephippias (Meyrick, 1907) but has narrower forewings and distinct genitalia.
