= Bactra leucogama =

Scientific classification
- Kingdom: Animalia
- Phylum: Arthropoda
- Class: Insecta
- Order: Lepidoptera
- Family: Tortricidae
- Genus: Bactra
- Species: B. leucogama

Binomial name
- Bactra leucogama Meyrick, 1909

Species of moth

Bactra leucogama is a moth of the family Tortricidae first described by Edward Meyrick in 1909. It is found in Sri Lanka.
