= Bactra honesta =

Scientific classification
- Kingdom: Animalia
- Phylum: Arthropoda
- Class: Insecta
- Order: Lepidoptera
- Family: Tortricidae
- Genus: Bactra
- Species: B. honesta

Binomial name
- Bactra honesta Meyrick, 1909

Synonyms
- Eucosma leuconephala Turner, 1925

Species of moth

Bactra honesta is a moth of the family Tortricidae first described by Edward Meyrick in 1909. It is found in India and Sri Lanka.
