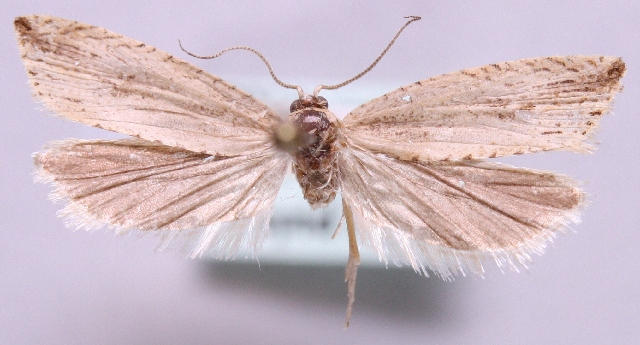

Scientific classification
- Kingdom: Animalia
- Phylum: Arthropoda
- Clade: Pancrustacea
- Class: Insecta
- Order: Lepidoptera
- Family: Tortricidae
- Genus: Bactra
- Species: B. suedana

Binomial name
- Bactra suedana Bengtsson, 1990

= Bactra suedana =

Species of moth

Bactra suedana is a moth, belonging to the family Tortricidae. The species was first described by Bengt Å. Bengtsson in 1989.

It is native to Northern Europe.
