= Henioloba =

Scientific classification
- Domain: Eukaryota
- Kingdom: Animalia
- Phylum: Arthropoda
- Class: Insecta
- Order: Lepidoptera
- Family: Tortricidae
- Tribe: Bactrini
- Genus: Henioloba; Diakonoff, 1973

Genus of tortrix moths

Henioloba is a genus of moths belonging to the subfamily Olethreutinae of the family Tortricidae.

== Species ==
- Henioloba bifacis Diakonoff, 1973
- Henioloba spelaeodes (Meyrick, 1931)

== See also ==
- List of Tortricidae genera
