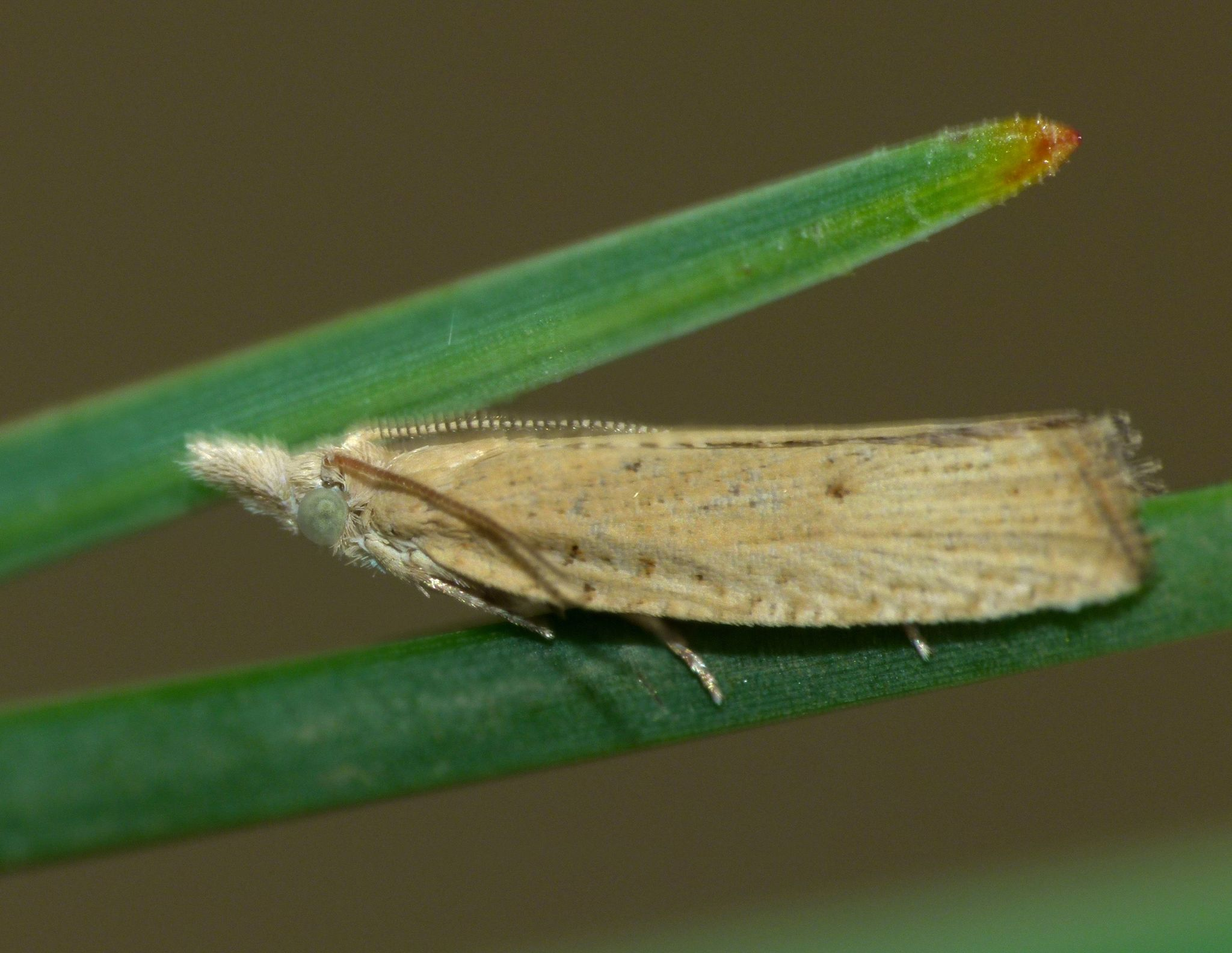
- Bactra noteraula

Scientific classification
- Domain: Eukaryota
- Kingdom: Animalia
- Phylum: Arthropoda
- Class: Insecta
- Order: Lepidoptera
- Family: Tortricidae
- Subfamily: Olethreutinae
- Tribe: Bactrini; Falkovitsh, 1962

Genera
- See text

= Bactrini =

Tribe of moths

The Bactrini are a tribe of tortrix moths.

== Genera ==
Bactra
Henioloba
Parabactra
Syntozyga
