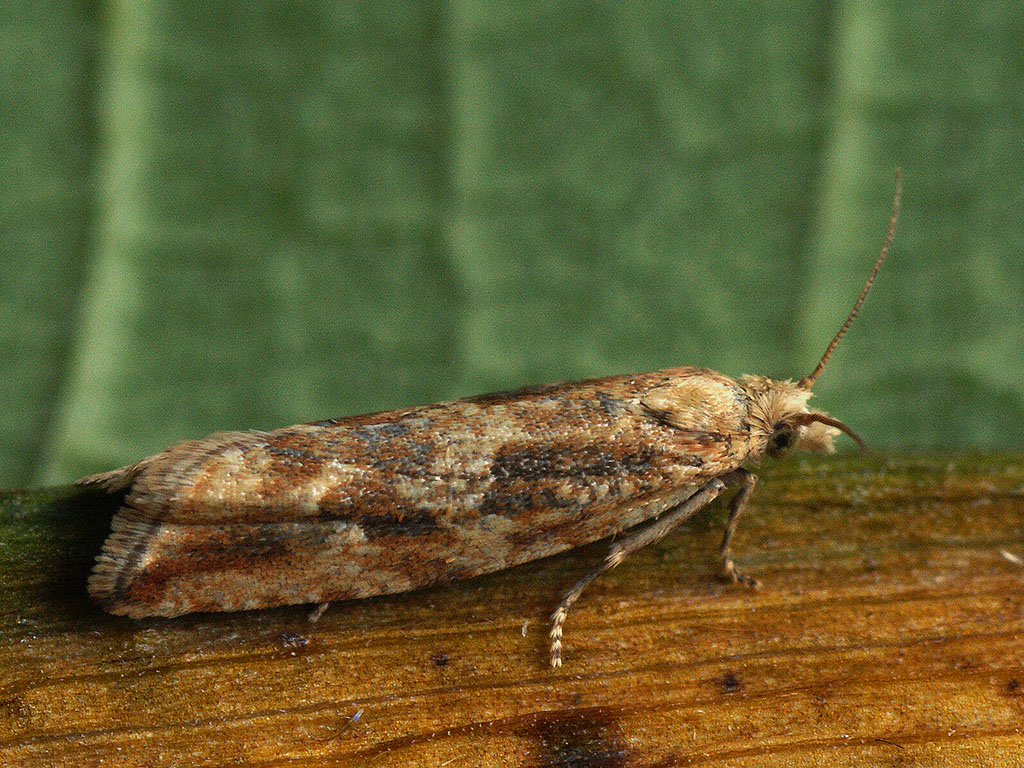
- Bactra furfurana Moscow Oblast

Scientific classification
- Kingdom: Animalia
- Phylum: Arthropoda
- Clade: Pancrustacea
- Class: Insecta
- Order: Lepidoptera
- Family: Tortricidae
- Genus: Bactra
- Species: B. furfurana

Binomial name
- Bactra furfurana (Haworth, 1811)

Synonyms
- Tortrix furfurana Haworth, 1811; Cochylis acutana Eversmann, 1844; Bactra cannisana Razowski, 1995; Sciaphila canuisana Milliere, 1874; Bactra helophaea Meyrick, 1928; Bactra longinqua iranica Diakonoff, 1959; Bactra furfurana var. kurentsovi Diakonoff, 1962; Phoxopteris lamana Lienig and Zeller, 1846; Bactra longinqua Diakonoff, 1959; Bactra furfurana ab. nigrovittana Obraztsov, 1949; Tortrix (Aphelia) scirpana Herrich-Schaffer, 1851

= Bactra furfurana =

Species of moth

Bactra furfurana, the mottled marble, is a moth of the family Tortricidae described by Adrian Hardy Haworth in 1811. It is found in the Nearctic and Palearctic realms.

The moth has a wingspan of 13–19 mm. Its habitat is damp marshy regions with adults flying in June and July. Adults are very similar to Bactra lancealana. Meyrick describes it - Forewings slightly narrower than in Bactra lancealana, costa straighter; light ochreous or ochreous-brownish, indistinctly darker-strigulated; basal patch, central fascia, and an apical streak darker ochreous or brown, indistinct, sometimes nearly obsolete. Hindwings are grey. The larva is shining green; head black, with a whitish line; plate of 2 dark brown. Julius von Kennel provides a full description.

The larvae feed within the stems of various rushes, such as Schoenoplectus lacustris and Juncus conglomeratus, hollowing out the stem.
