= Bactra coronata =

Scientific classification
- Domain: Eukaryota
- Kingdom: Animalia
- Phylum: Arthropoda
- Class: Insecta
- Order: Lepidoptera
- Family: Tortricidae
- Genus: Bactra
- Species: B. coronata

Binomial name
- Bactra coronata Diakonoff, 1950

Synonyms
- Bactra (Chiloides) coronata Diakonoff, 1956

Species of moth

Bactra coronata is a moth of the family Tortricidae first described by Alexey Diakonoff in 1950. It is found in Sri Lanka, Java, Borneo and the Philippines.
