= Parabactra =

Scientific classification
- Kingdom: Animalia
- Phylum: Arthropoda
- Class: Insecta
- Order: Lepidoptera
- Family: Tortricidae
- Tribe: Bactrini
- Genus: Parabactra; Meyrick, 1910

Genus of tortrix moths

Parabactra is a genus of moths belonging to the subfamily Olethreutinae of the family Tortricidae.

== Species ==
- Parabactra arenosa (Meyrick, 1909)
- Parabactra foederata (Meyrick, 1909)
- Parabactra sociata (Meyrick, 1909)

== See also ==
- List of Tortricidae genera
