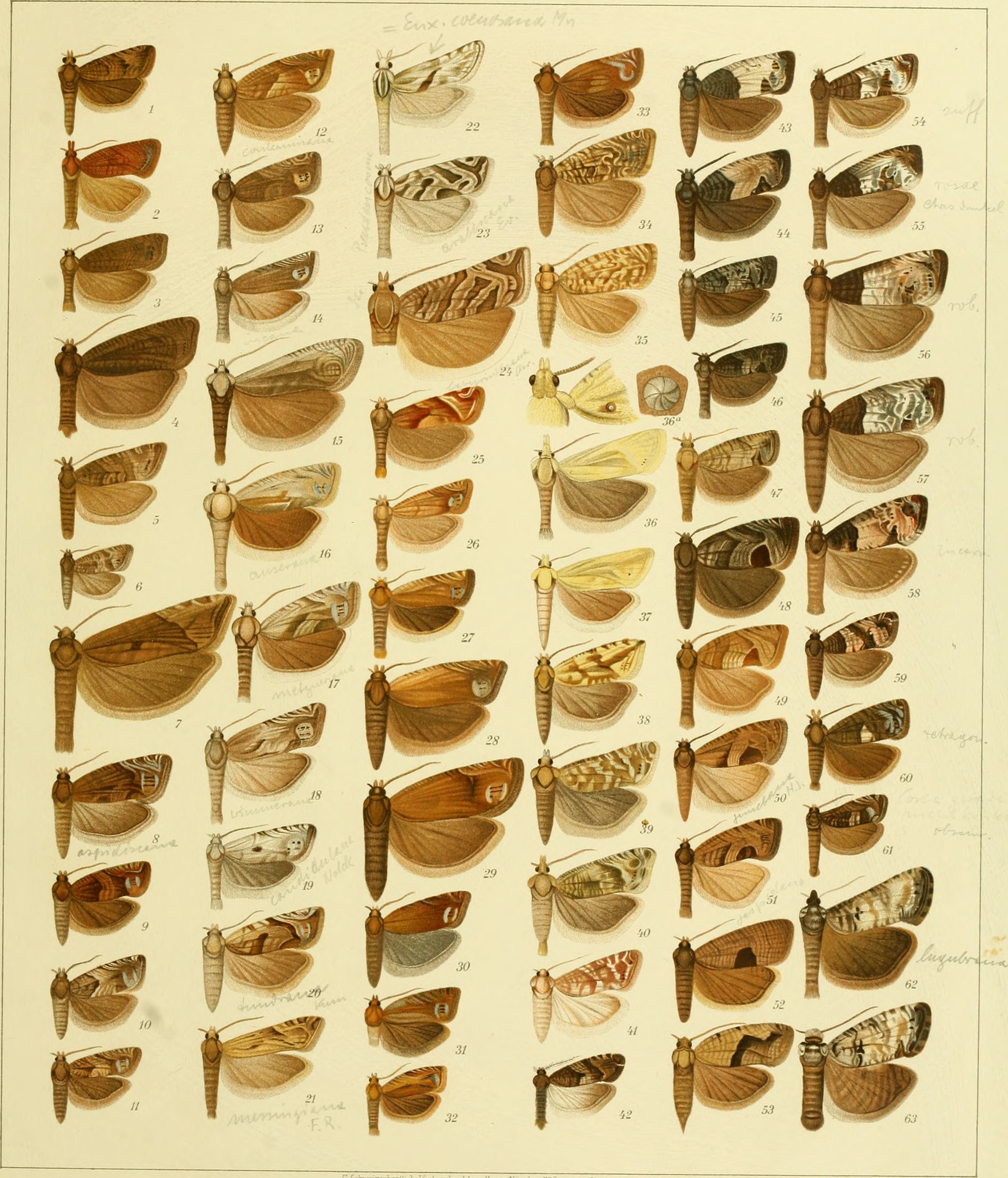
- in Kennel Die palaearktischen tortriciden figure 1 male

Scientific classification
- Domain: Eukaryota
- Kingdom: Animalia
- Phylum: Arthropoda
- Class: Insecta
- Order: Lepidoptera
- Family: Tortricidae
- Genus: Bactra
- Species: B. bactrana

Binomial name
- Bactra bactrana (Kennel, 1901)

Synonyms
- Semasia bactrana Kennel, 1901; Bactra cyperana Amsel, 1952; Bactra graminivora Meyrick, 1922; Bactra mediterraneana Agenjo, 1952

= Bactra bactrana =

Species of moth

Bactra bactrana is a species of moth of the family Tortricidae. It is found on the Canary Islands, Sicily and Malta and in southern Spain, Portugal, southern Italy, France, Greece, Morocco, Algeria, Egypt, Asia Minor, Arabia, Iraq, Iran, the Caucasus, Afghanistan, the Caspian area, Tajikistan, Kyrgyzstan, Uzbekistan, Pakistan, India, the Republic of Congo, Madagascar, Sudan and Gambia.

The wingspan is 12–19 mm for males and 13–21 mm for females. The ground colour of the forewings is ochreous yellow with dense greyish sprinkling. The hindwings are brown. Adults have been recorded on wing in July in Europe.

The larvae feed on Poa species and Cynodon dactylon.
