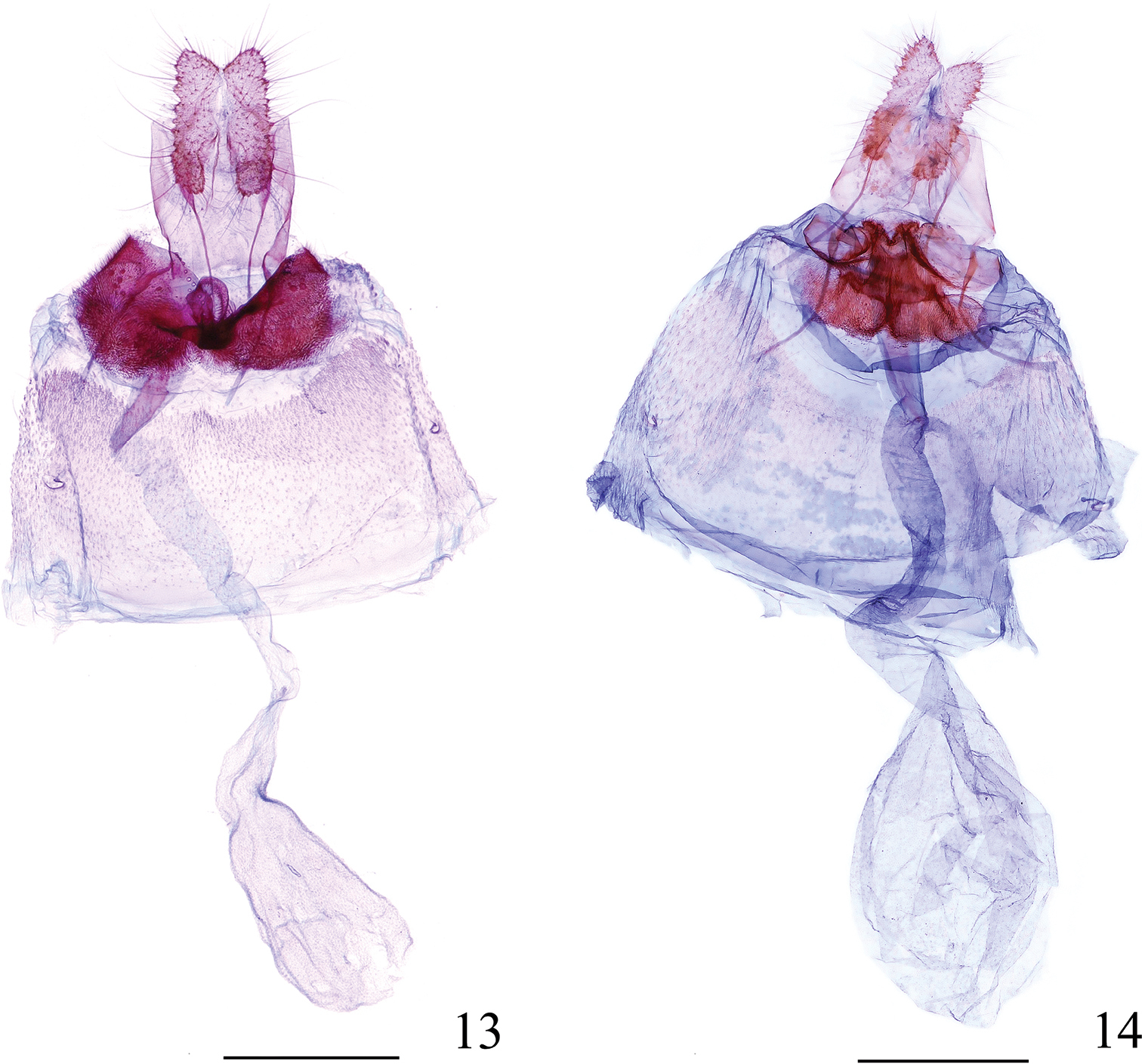

Scientific classification
- Domain: Eukaryota
- Kingdom: Animalia
- Phylum: Arthropoda
- Class: Insecta
- Order: Lepidoptera
- Family: Tortricidae
- Tribe: Bactrini
- Genus: Syntozyga; Lower, 1901

= Syntozyga =

Genus of tortrix moths

Syntozyga is a genus of moths belonging to the subfamily Olethreutinae of the family Tortricidae.

== Species ==
- Syntozyga anconia (Meyrick, 1911)
- Syntozyga aspersana (Kuznetzov, 1988)
- Syntozyga bicuspis Diakonoff, 1973
- Syntozyga endaphana (Diakonoff, 1968)
- Syntozyga ephippias (Meyrick, 1907)
- Syntozyga episema (Diakonoff, 1973)
- Syntozyga macrosperma Diakonoff, 1971
- Syntozyga negligens (Diakonoff, 1973)
- Syntozyga pedias (Meyrick, 1920)
- Syntozyga psammetalla Lower, 1901
- Syntozyga sedifera (Meyrick, 1911)
- Syntozyga spirographa (Diakonoff, 1968)
- Syntozyga stagonophora Diakonoff, 1973
- Syntozyga transversa (Diakonoff, 1973)

== See also ==
- List of Tortricidae genera
