= Syntozyga anconia =

Scientific classification
- Kingdom: Animalia
- Phylum: Arthropoda
- Class: Insecta
- Order: Lepidoptera
- Family: Tortricidae
- Genus: Syntozyga
- Species: S. anconia

Binomial name
- Syntozyga anconia (Meyrick, 1911)

Synonyms
- Polychrosis anconia Meyrick, 1911; Epichorista pleurosema Turner, 1916; Epichorista gonodesma Turner, 1929; Epichorista loxomochla Turner, 1945; Epichorista eurymochla Turner, 1945

Species of moth

Syntozyga anconia is a species of moth of the family Tortricidae. It is found in Australia, where it has been recorded from Queensland and New South Wales.

The wingspan is about 11 mm. The forewings are whitish, with fuscous irroration and markings, as well as numerous dark-fuscous strigulae (fine streaks) on the costa. The hindwings are grey.
