= Bactra testudinea =

Scientific classification
- Domain: Eukaryota
- Kingdom: Animalia
- Phylum: Arthropoda
- Class: Insecta
- Order: Lepidoptera
- Family: Tortricidae
- Genus: Bactra
- Species: B. testudinea

Binomial name
- Bactra testudinea Turner, 1916

Species of moth

Bactra testudinea is a species of moth of the family Tortricidae. It is found in Australia, where it has been recorded from Queensland.

The wingspan is 20–25 mm. The forewings are pale brownish, suffused with fuscous brown and with numerous dark strigulae (fine streaks) on the costa and dorsum. The hindwings are grey, but paler towards the base.
