= Bactra punctistrigana =

Scientific classification
- Domain: Eukaryota
- Kingdom: Animalia
- Phylum: Arthropoda
- Class: Insecta
- Order: Lepidoptera
- Family: Tortricidae
- Genus: Bactra
- Species: B. punctistrigana

Binomial name
- Bactra punctistrigana Mabille, 1900

Species of moth

Bactra punctistrigana is a moth of the family Tortricidae. It is known from Namibia, Madagascar, Mozambique, Nigeria, South Africa and Zimbabwe.
