= Bactra straminea =

Scientific classification
- Kingdom: Animalia
- Phylum: Arthropoda
- Class: Insecta
- Order: Lepidoptera
- Family: Tortricidae
- Genus: Bactra
- Species: B. straminea

Binomial name
- Bactra straminea (Butler, 1881)

Synonyms
- Chiloides straminea Butler, 1881

Species of moth

Bactra straminea is a moth of the family Tortricidae. It was first described by Arthur Gardiner Butler in 1881. It is only known from the Hawaiian islands of Kauai, Oahu, Molokai, Maui, Lanai and Hawaii, but might be an introduced species, although it has not been recorded from any other location.

Bactra iomolybda Meyrick, 1932 was removed from synonymy by Austin & Rubinoff.
