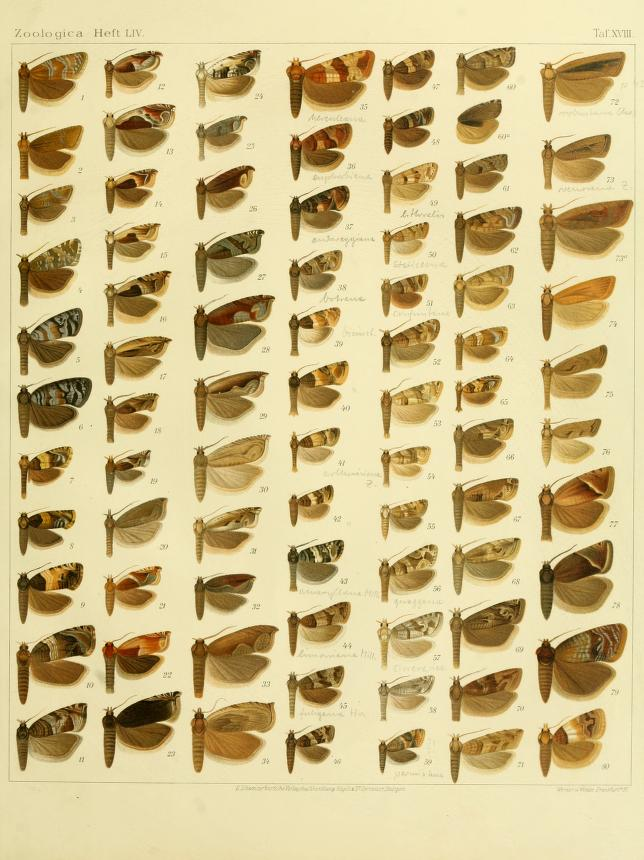
- Bactra robustana female fig 72
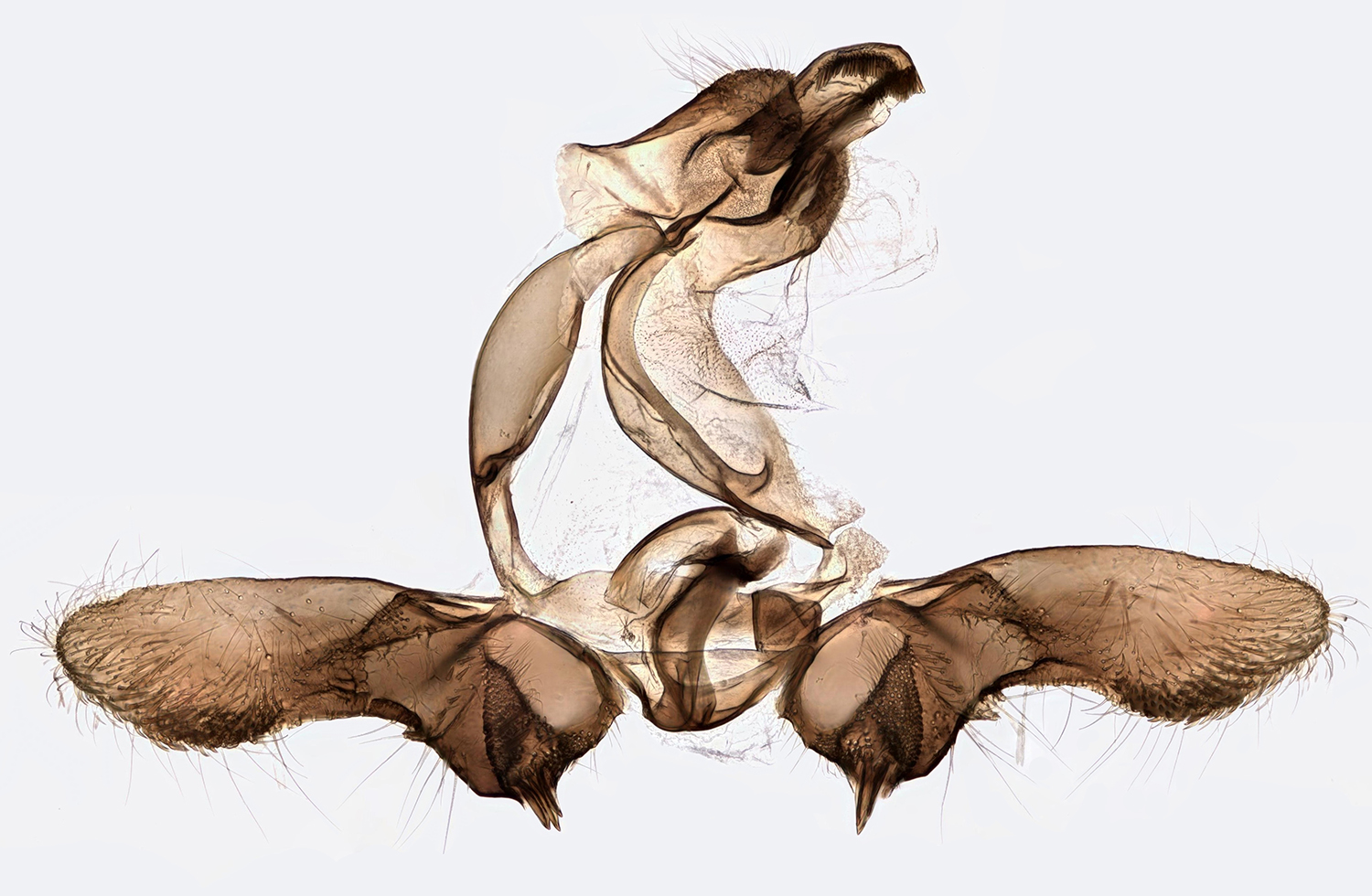
- male genitalia

Scientific classification
- Domain: Eukaryota
- Kingdom: Animalia
- Phylum: Arthropoda
- Class: Insecta
- Order: Lepidoptera
- Family: Tortricidae
- Genus: Bactra
- Species: B. robustana

Binomial name
- Bactra robustana (Christoph, 1872)

= Bactra robustana =

Species of moth

Bactra robustana is a moth belonging to the family Tortricidae. The species was first described by Hugo Theodor Christoph in 1872.

It is native to the Palearctic including Europe. where it is a salt marsh species. Genitalia dissection is necessary for differentiation from other Bactra species. Julius von Kennel provides a full description.

The larvae feed internally in the stems of Bolboschoenus maritimus.

The flight period is June and July, and the moths can be attracted to light.
