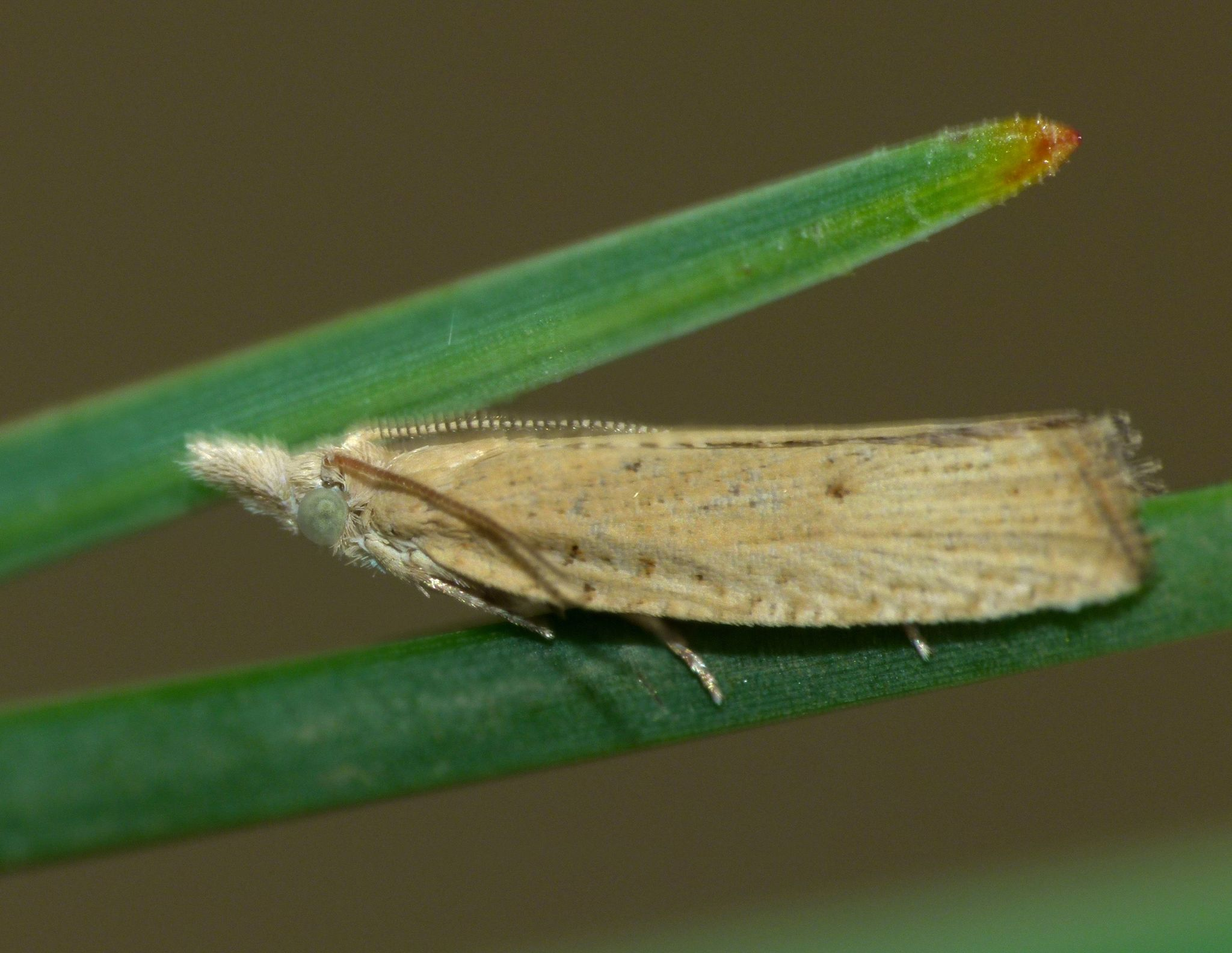

Scientific classification
- Kingdom: Animalia
- Phylum: Arthropoda
- Class: Insecta
- Order: Lepidoptera
- Family: Tortricidae
- Genus: Bactra
- Species: B. noteraula

Binomial name
- Bactra noteraula Walsingham, 1907

Synonyms
- Noteraula straminea Meyrick, 1885; Bactra xystrota Meyrick, 1911

= Bactra noteraula =

Species of moth endemic to New Zealand

Bactra noteraula is a species of moth of the family Tortricidae first described by Thomas de Grey, 6th Baron Walsingham in 1907. It is endemic to New Zealand.

== Life cycle ==
The larvae pupate at the base of their host plant.

== Habitat and host species ==
This species inhabits mainly coastal areas. The larval host species are species in the plant family Cyperaceae.
