= Bactra stagnicolana =

Scientific classification
- Kingdom: Animalia
- Phylum: Arthropoda
- Clade: Pancrustacea
- Class: Insecta
- Order: Lepidoptera
- Family: Tortricidae
- Genus: Bactra
- Species: B. stagnicolana

Binomial name
- Bactra stagnicolana Zeller, 1852

Synonyms
- Ancylolomia siccella Walker, 1866; Bactra siccella

Species of moth

Bactra stagnicolana is a moth of the family Tortricidae. It is known from Angola, Comoros, Democratic Republic of Congo, Kenya, Madagascar, Malawi, Mauritius, South Africa South Africa and Zimbabwe.
