= Bactra lacteana =

Scientific classification
- Domain: Eukaryota
- Kingdom: Animalia
- Phylum: Arthropoda
- Class: Insecta
- Order: Lepidoptera
- Family: Tortricidae
- Genus: Bactra
- Species: B. lacteana

Binomial name
- Bactra lacteana Caradja, 1916

Species of moth

Bactra lacteana is a moth belonging to the family Tortricidae first described by Aristide Caradja in 1916.

It is native to Europe.
