= Bactra chariessa =

Scientific classification
- Domain: Eukaryota
- Kingdom: Animalia
- Phylum: Arthropoda
- Class: Insecta
- Order: Lepidoptera
- Family: Tortricidae
- Genus: Bactra
- Species: B. chariessa

Binomial name
- Bactra chariessa Diakonoff, 1964

Synonyms
- Bactra (Chiloides) chariessa Diakonoff, 1964

Species of moth

Bactra chariessa is a moth of the family Tortricidae first described by Alexey Diakonoff in 1964. It is found in Sri Lanka.
