= Bactra angulata =

Scientific classification
- Domain: Eukaryota
- Kingdom: Animalia
- Phylum: Arthropoda
- Class: Insecta
- Order: Lepidoptera
- Family: Tortricidae
- Genus: Bactra
- Species: B. angulata

Binomial name
- Bactra angulata Diakonoff, 1956

Species of moth

Bactra angulata is a moth of the family Tortricidae first described by Alexey Diakonoff in 1956. It is found in Borneo, Halmahera, the Palau Islands, southern New Guinea and Sri Lanka.
