= Bactra psammitis =

Scientific classification
- Domain: Eukaryota
- Kingdom: Animalia
- Phylum: Arthropoda
- Class: Insecta
- Order: Lepidoptera
- Family: Tortricidae
- Genus: Bactra
- Species: B. psammitis

Binomial name
- Bactra psammitis Turner, 1916

Synonyms
- Eucosma ammopastea Turner, 1946

Species of moth

Bactra psammitis is a species of moth of the family Tortricidae. It is found in Australia, where it has been recorded from South Australia and New South Wales.

The wingspan is 14–15 mm.
