= Bactra cerata =

Scientific classification
- Kingdom: Animalia
- Phylum: Arthropoda
- Class: Insecta
- Order: Lepidoptera
- Family: Tortricidae
- Genus: Bactra
- Species: B. cerata

Binomial name
- Bactra cerata (Meyrick, 1909)

Synonyms
- Polychrosis cerata Meyrick, 1909; Bactra (Chiloides) cerata Diakonoff, 1964

Species of moth

Bactra cerata is a moth of the family Tortricidae first described by Edward Meyrick in 1909. It is found in India and Sri Lanka.
