= Bactra minima =

Scientific classification
- Kingdom: Animalia
- Phylum: Arthropoda
- Class: Insecta
- Order: Lepidoptera
- Family: Tortricidae
- Genus: Bactra
- Species: B. minima

Binomial name
- Bactra minima Meyrick, 1909

Synonyms
- Bactra anpingiana Strand, 1920; Bactra microtripta Meyrick, 1927; Bactra phaeopis Meyrick, 1911; Bactra minima psila Diakonoff, 1964

Species of moth

Bactra minima is a moth of the family Tortricidae first described by Edward Meyrick in 1909. It is found in Sri Lanka.
