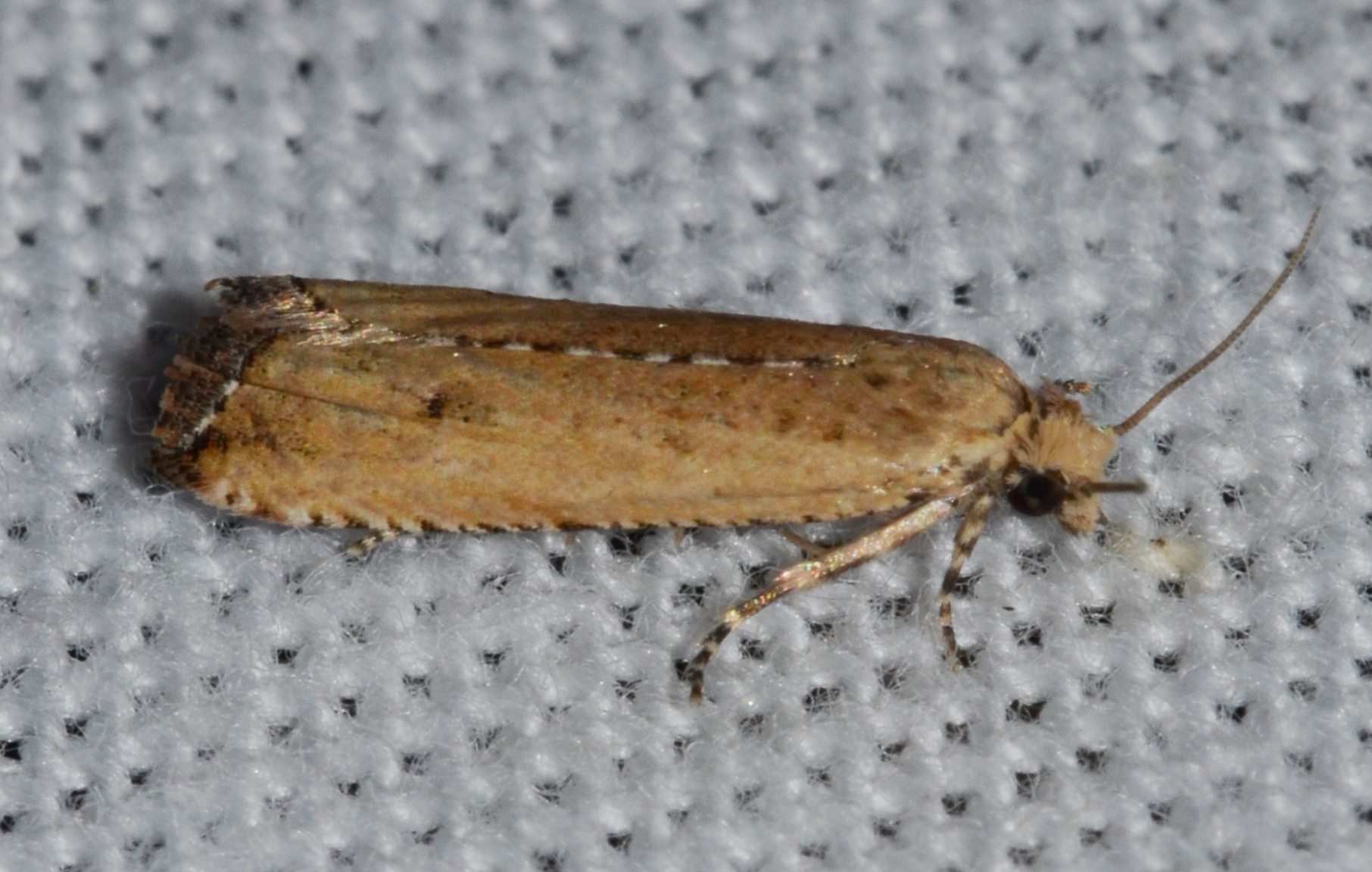

Scientific classification
- Kingdom: Animalia
- Phylum: Arthropoda
- Clade: Pancrustacea
- Class: Insecta
- Order: Lepidoptera
- Family: Tortricidae
- Genus: Bactra
- Species: B. verutana

Binomial name
- Bactra verutana Zeller, 1875

Synonyms
- Bactra lanceolana var. verutana Zeller, 1875; Bactra verutana var. albipuncta Heinrich, 1926; Bactra chrysea Heinrich, 1926; Bactra dasioma Diakonoff, 1963; Capua xuthochyta Turner, 1945

= Bactra verutana =

Species of moth

Bactra verutana, the javelin moth, is a species of moth of the family Tortricidae. It is found in North America, where it has been recorded from Florida, Texas, Mississippi, North Carolina, Indiana, Missouri, Ontario, Alberta, Quebec and Labrador. It is also found in Cuba, Mexico, Panama, Paraguay, Puerto Rico, Mozambique and South Africa. The habitat consists of prairies, aspen parkland, foothills and mixed wood areas.

The wingspan is 11–17 mm.

The larvae feed on the leaves, fascicles and basal bulbs of Cyperus esculentus, Scirpus and Juncus species.
