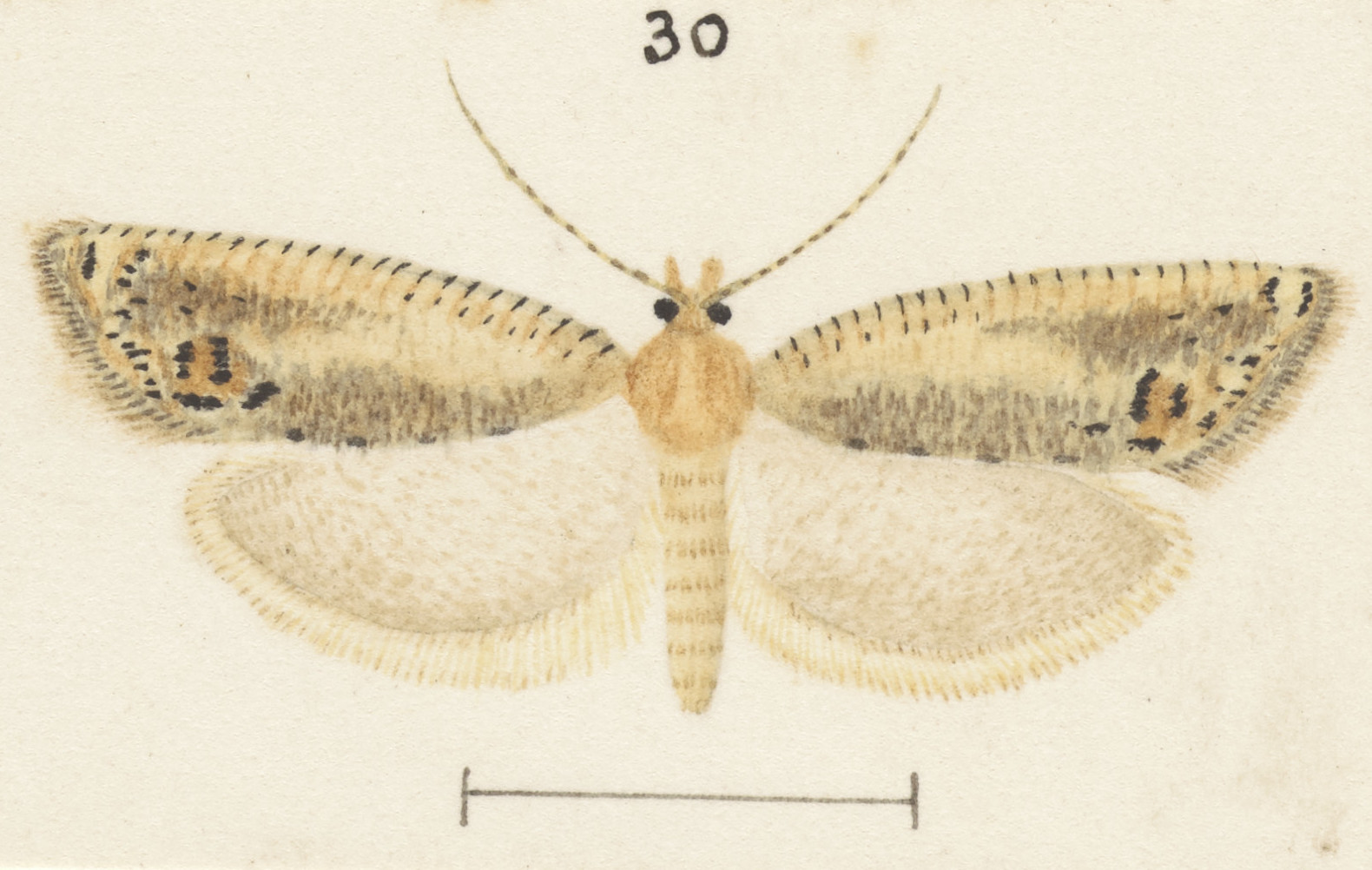

Scientific classification
- Kingdom: Animalia
- Phylum: Arthropoda
- Class: Insecta
- Order: Lepidoptera
- Family: Tortricidae
- Genus: Bactra
- Species: B. optanias

Binomial name
- Bactra optanias Meyrick, 1911

Synonyms
- Bactra opatanias Meyrick, 1911; Bactra excelsa Diakonoff, 1956; Bactra litigatrix Meyrick, 1928; Bactra monochorda Diakonoff, 1950; Bactra passercula Turner, 1916

= Bactra optanias =

Species of moth

Bactra optanias is a species of moth of the family Tortricidae first described by Edward Meyrick in 1911. It is found in Papua New Guinea, Australia (Queensland, Norfolk Island), New Zealand, Java, Tahiti, Sri Lanka, New Caledonia, the Caroline Islands, the southern Mariana Islands, Rapa Iti and Micronesia.

The wingspan is 16–20 mm. The forewings are whitish brown or brown, with numerous fine oblique fuscous costal strigulae (fine streaks) and some fuscous dorsal dots, as well as a fuscous terminal line. The hindwings are whitish, with slight greyish suffusion on the terminal edge.

== Habitat and host species ==
This species inhabits swampy terrain. The larval host species are species in the plant family Cyperaceae. The larvae pupate amongst their host plants.
