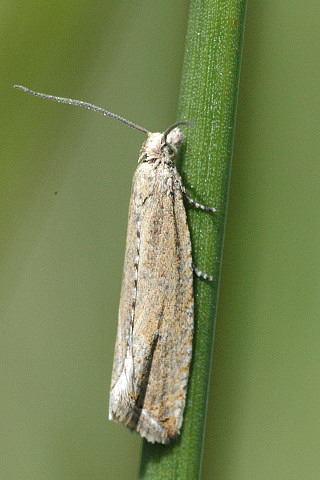

Scientific classification
- Kingdom: Animalia
- Phylum: Arthropoda
- Clade: Pancrustacea
- Class: Insecta
- Order: Lepidoptera
- Family: Tortricidae
- Genus: Bactra
- Species: B. lancealana

Binomial name
- Bactra lancealana (Hübner, 1799)

Synonyms
- Tortrix lancealana Hübner, 1799

= Bactra lancealana =

Species of moth

Bactra lancealana is a moth of the family Tortricidae found in Europe. The moth has a wingspan of 11–20 mm. The forewings are pale ochreous or ochreous- brownish, costa strigulated with darker ochreous or dark fuscous; a spot in disc at 1/3 and an angular mark beyond middle dark fuscous, often obsolete, sometimes forming a more or less complete dark median streak from base to apex; central fascia sometimes indicated on costa. Hindwings are grey. The larva is greenish or whitish-fleshcolour; head and plate of 2 black. It is very similar to Bactra furfurana.

The moth flies from May to October.

Bactra lancealana larvae mainly feed on various rushes, including Juncus and Scirpus.

== Notes ==
1. The flight season refers to Belgium and the Netherlands. This may vary in other parts of the range.
