= Bactra anthracosema =

Scientific classification
- Domain: Eukaryota
- Kingdom: Animalia
- Phylum: Arthropoda
- Class: Insecta
- Order: Lepidoptera
- Family: Tortricidae
- Genus: Bactra
- Species: B. anthracosema

Binomial name
- Bactra anthracosema Turner, 1916

Species of moth

Bactra anthracosema is a species of moth of the family Tortricidae. It is found in Australia, where it has been recorded from the Northern Territory.

The wingspan is about 15 mm. The forewings are pale brownish with dark fuscous markings and a suffused median streak, as well as numerous short oblique costal strigulae (fine streaks) and some minute dorsal strigulae. The hindwings are grey whitish.
