= Syntozyga ephippias =

Scientific classification
- Kingdom: Animalia
- Phylum: Arthropoda
- Clade: Pancrustacea
- Class: Insecta
- Order: Lepidoptera
- Family: Tortricidae
- Genus: Syntozyga
- Species: S. ephippias

Binomial name
- Syntozyga ephippias (Meyrick, 1907)

Synonyms
- Chrosis ephippias Meyrick, 1907; Polychrosis ephippias (Meyrick, 1909); Bubonoxena ephippias Diakonoff, 1968

Species of moth

Syntozyga ephippias is a tortrix moth (family Tortricidae), belonging to tribe Eucosmini of subfamily Olethreutinae. The species was first described by Edward Meyrick in 1907. It is found Sri Lanka, India, the Democratic Republic of the Congo, South Africa and Rodrigues.

Larval food plants are Commelina benghalensis (Commelinaceae) and Bambusa species.
