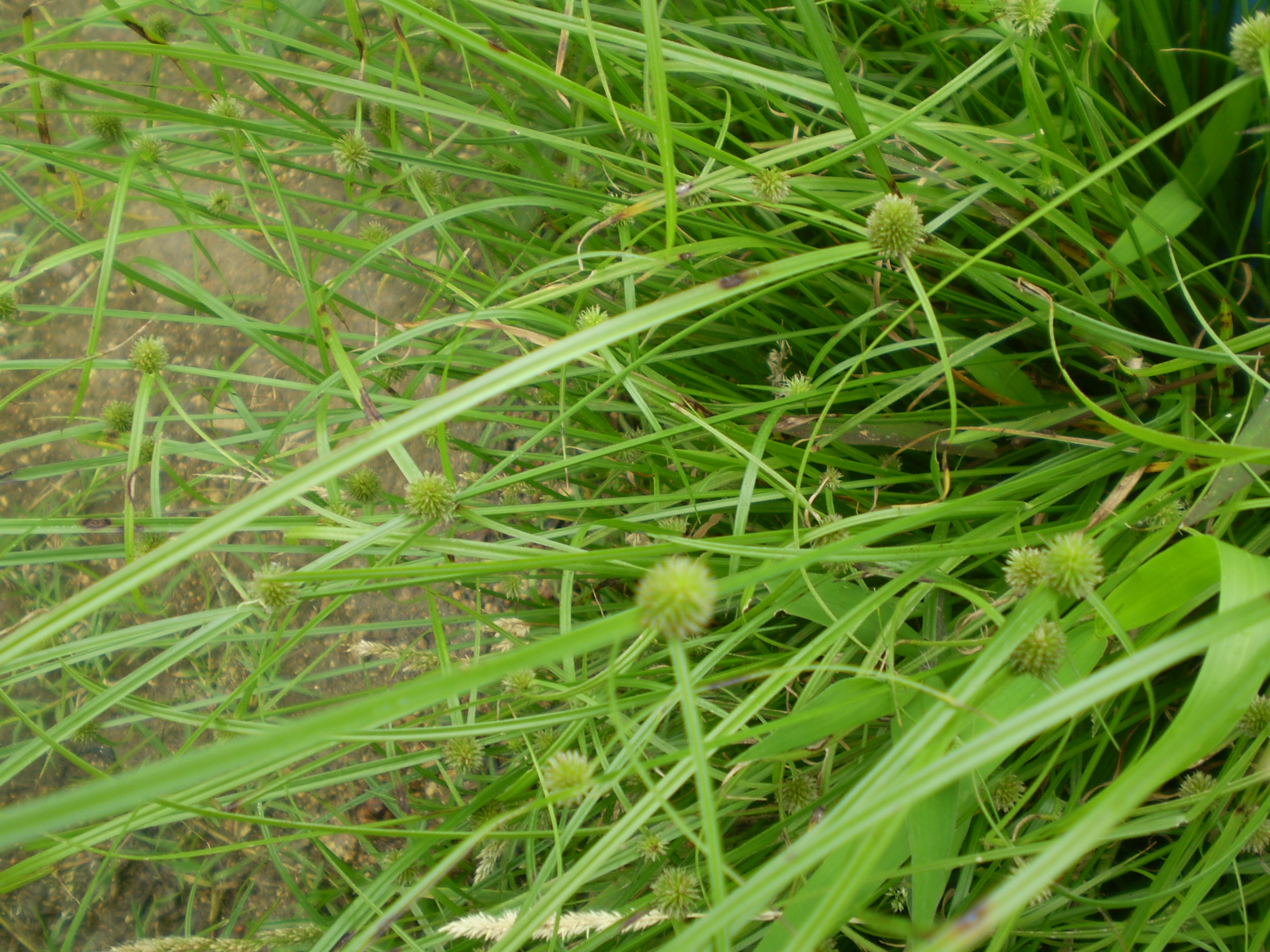

Scientific classification
- Kingdom: Plantae
- Clade: Tracheophytes
- Clade: Angiosperms
- Clade: Monocots
- Clade: Commelinids
- Order: Poales
- Family: Cyperaceae
- Genus: Cyperus
- Species: C. brevifolius

Binomial name
- Cyperus brevifolius (Rottb.) Hassk.

Synonyms
- Kyllinga brevifolia Rottb.; Cyperus cruciformis (Schrad. ex Schult.) Endl.; Kyllinga aurata Nees; Kyllinga cruciata Nees nom. inval.; Kyllinga cruciformis Schrad. ex Schult.; Kyllinga elongata Kunth; Kyllinga fuscata Miq.; Kyllinga gracilis Kunth; Kyllinga hohenackeri Hochst. ex Steud.; Kyllinga honolulu Steud. ex Jard.; Kyllinga intermedia R.Br.; Kyllinga intricata Cherm.; Kyllinga laxa Schrad. ex Nees; Kyllinga longiculmis Miq.; Kyllinga monocephala L.f. nom. illeg.; Kyllinga monocephala Thunb. nom. illeg.; Kyllinga nivea Pers.; Kyllinga odorata Liebm. nom. illeg.; Kyllinga oligostachya Boeckeler; Kyllinga pumilio Steud.; Kyllinga sojauxii Boeckeler; Kyllinga sororia Kunth; Kyllinga tenuis Baldwin; Kyllinga tenuissima Steud.; Kyllinga tricephala Salisb.; Mariscus kyllingioides Steud.; Schoenus capitatus Crantz

= Cyperus brevifolius =

Species of grass-like plant

Cyperus brevifolius is a species of sedge known by several common names, including shortleaf spikesedge, green kyllinga, perennial greenhead sedge, and kyllinga weed. It is native to tropical areas in the Americas but it can be found in warm regions around the world where it is an introduced species. This is a rhizomatous perennial herb growing one to several erect stems to heights up to about half a meter, often much shorter. It produces tiny inflorescences of a few spikelets each which in total are less than a centimeter long. Pollens are tiny, approximately 20-30 microns in size. It is sometimes a weed in wet areas such as cultivated land and irrigation ditches.

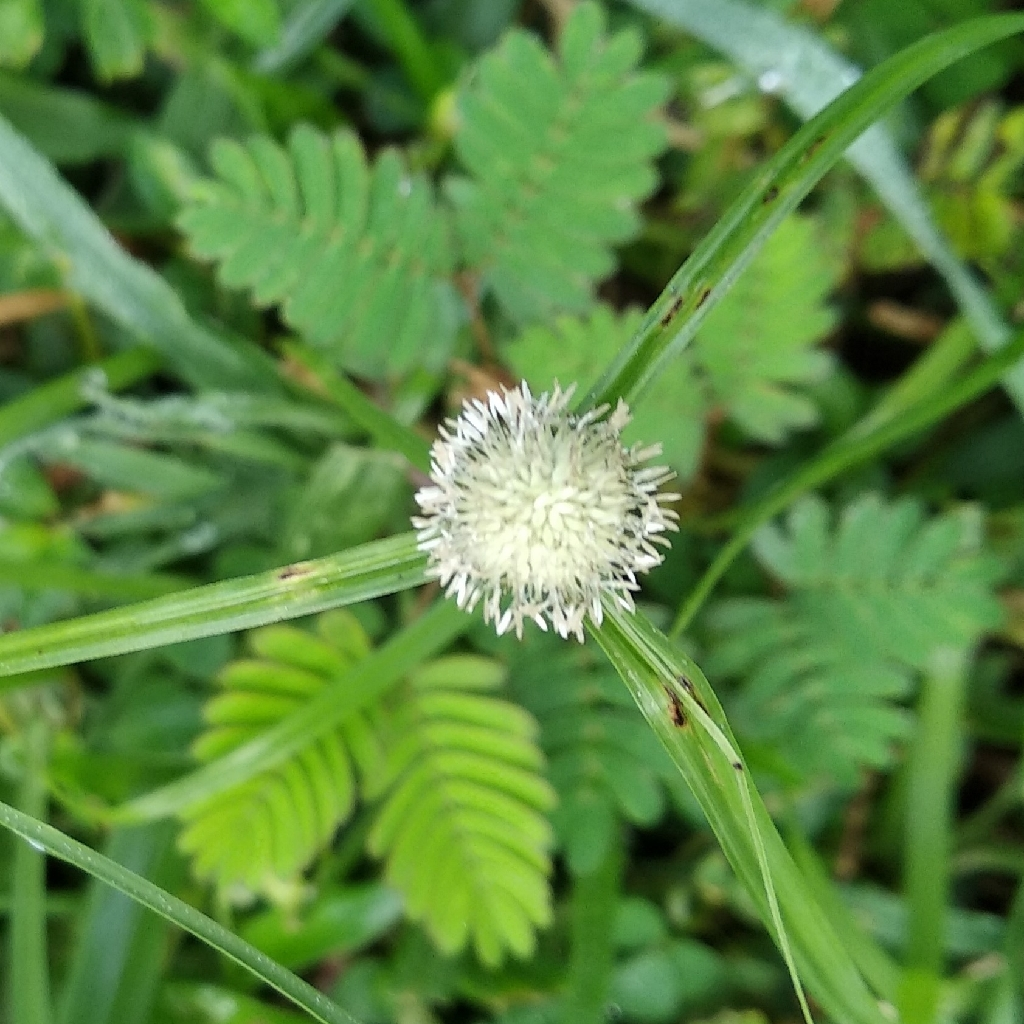
Inflorescence

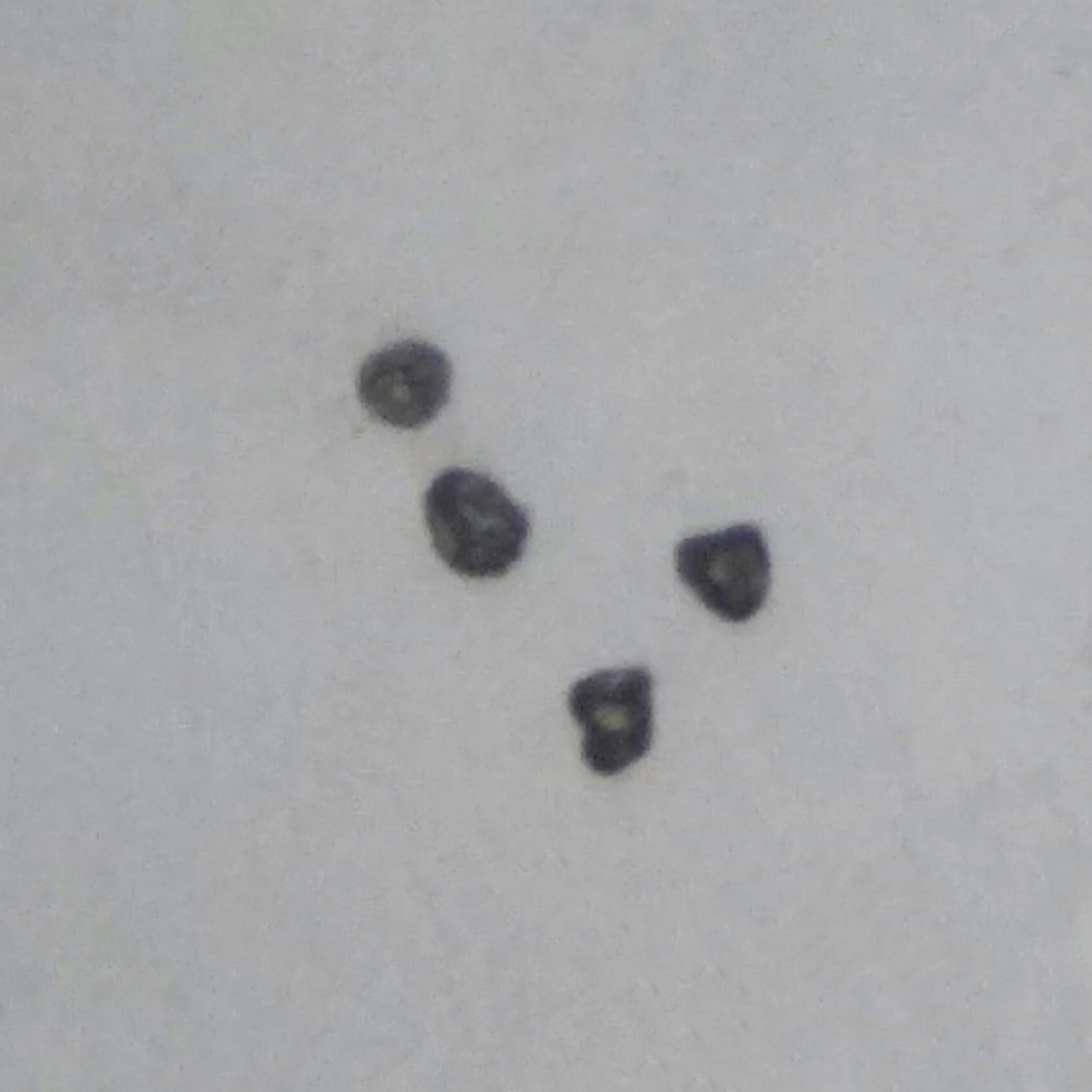
Pollens
