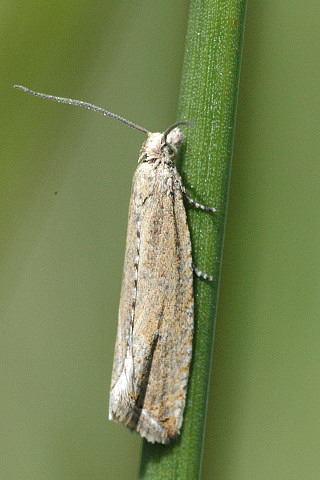
- Bactra lancealana

Scientific classification
- Kingdom: Animalia
- Phylum: Arthropoda
- Class: Insecta
- Order: Lepidoptera
- Family: Tortricidae
- Subfamily: Olethreutinae
- Tribe: Bactrini
- Genus: Bactra; Stephens, 1834

Synonyms
- Aphelia Stephens, 1829, not Hubner, [1825]; Bracta Pierce & Metcalfe, 1922; Chiloides Butler, 1881; Leptia Guenee, 1845; Nannobactra Diakonoff, 1956; Noteraula Meyrick, 1892; Protobactra Diakonoff, 1964; Spinobactra Diakonoff, 1963

= Bactra (moth) =

Genus of tortrix moths

Bactra is a genus of moths belonging to the subfamily Olethreutinae of the family Tortricidae.

== Species ==
- Bactra ablabes Turner, 1946
- Bactra aciculata Diakonoff, 1963
- Bactra adelographa Diakonoff, 1983
- Bactra adelpha Diakonoff, 1963
- Bactra adoceta Diakonoff, 1964
- Bactra aletha Diakonoff, 1963
- Bactra alexandri Diakonoff, 1962
- Bactra ametra Diakonoff, 1983
- Bactra amseli Diakonoff, 1959
- Bactra angulata Diakonoff, 1956
- Bactra anthracosema Turner, 1916
- Bactra atopa Diakonoff, 1989
- Bactra bactrana (Kennel, 1901)
- Bactra blepharopis Meyrick, 1911
- Bactra boesemani Diakonoff, 1956
- Bactra boschmai Diakonoff, 1956
- Bactra capnopepla Turner, 1946
- Bactra cerata (Meyrick, 1909)
- Bactra chariessa Diakonoff, 1964
- Bactra clarescens Meyrick, 1912
- Bactra clarkei Diakonoff, 1964
- Bactra confusa Diakonoff, 1963
- Bactra contraria Diakonoff, 1956
- Bactra coronata Diakonoff, 1950
- Bactra crithopa Diakonoff, 1957
- Bactra cultellana Zeller, 1877
- Bactra diachorda Meyrick, 1932
- Bactra diakonoffi Amsel, 1958
- Bactra difissa Diakonoff, 1964
- Bactra distinctana Mabille, 1900
- Bactra dolia Diakonoff, 1963
- Bactra egenana Kennel, 1901
- Bactra endea Diakonoff, 1963
- Bactra erasa Meyrick, 1928
- Bactra erema Diakonoff, 1964
- Bactra extrema Diakonoff, 1962
- Bactra fasciata Diakonoff, 1963
- Bactra festa Diakonoff, 1959
- Bactra fracta Diakonoff, 1964
- Bactra furfurana (Haworth, [1811])
- Bactra fuscidorsana Zeller, 1877
- Bactra honesta Meyrick, 1909
- Bactra hostilis Diakonoff, 1956
- Bactra iomolybda Meyrick, 1932 (from Hawaii)
- Bactra jansei Diakonoff, 1963
- Bactra kostermansi Diakonoff, 1956
- Bactra lacteana Caradja, 1916
- Bactra lancealana (Hubner, [1796-1799])
- Bactra legitima Meyrick, 1911
- Bactra maiorina Heinrich, 1923
- Bactra meridiana Diakonoff, 1956
- Bactra metriacma Meyrick, 1909
- Bactra minima Meyrick, 1909
- Bactra misoolensia Diakonoff, 1956
- Bactra nea Diakonoff, 1964
- Bactra nesiotis Diakonoff, 1963
- Bactra neuricana Zeller, 1877
- Bactra noteraula Walsingham, in Sharp, 1907
- Bactra oceani Diakonoff, 1956
- Bactra ochrographa Diakonoff, 1989
- Bactra omoomoo Austin & Rubinoff, 2024 (from Hawaii)
- Bactra optanias Meyrick, 1911
- Bactra orbiculi Diakonoff, 1956
- Bactra perisema Diakonoff, 1964
- Bactra phaulopa Meyrick, 1911
- Bactra philocherda Diakonoff, 1964
- Bactra priapeia Heinrich, 1923
- Bactra psammitis Turner, 1916
- Bactra punctistrigana Mabille, 1900
- Bactra pythonia Meyrick, 1910
- Bactra rhabdonoma Diakonoff, 1963
- Bactra robustana (Christoph, 1872)
- Bactra salpictris Diakonoff, 1963
- Bactra sardonia (Meyrick, 1908)
- Bactra scrupulosa Meyrick, 1911
- Bactra seria Meyrick, 1917
- Bactra simpliciana Chrtien, 1915
- Bactra simplissima (Diakonoff, 1953)
- Bactra sinassula Diakonoff, 1963
- Bactra sinistra Heinrich, 1926
- Bactra solivaga Diakonoff, 1956
- Bactra sordidata Diakonoff, 1963
- Bactra spinosa Diakonoff, 1963
- Bactra stagnicolana Zeller, 1852
- Bactra stramenticia Diakonoff, 1953
- Bactra straminea (Butler, 1881)
- Bactra suedana Bengtsson, 1989
- Bactra testudinea Turner, 1916
- Bactra tornastis Meyrick, 1909
- Bactra tradens Diakonoff, 1963
- Bactra transvola Meyrick, 1924
- Bactra triceps Diakonoff, 1963
- Bactra trimera Diakonoff, 1963
- Bactra tylophora Diakonoff, 1963
- Bactra vaga Diakonoff, 1964
- Bactra venosana (Zeller, 1847)
- Bactra verutana Zeller, 1875

== See also ==
- List of Tortricidae genera
